= Festoon =

Decoration of a wreath or garland hanging from two points

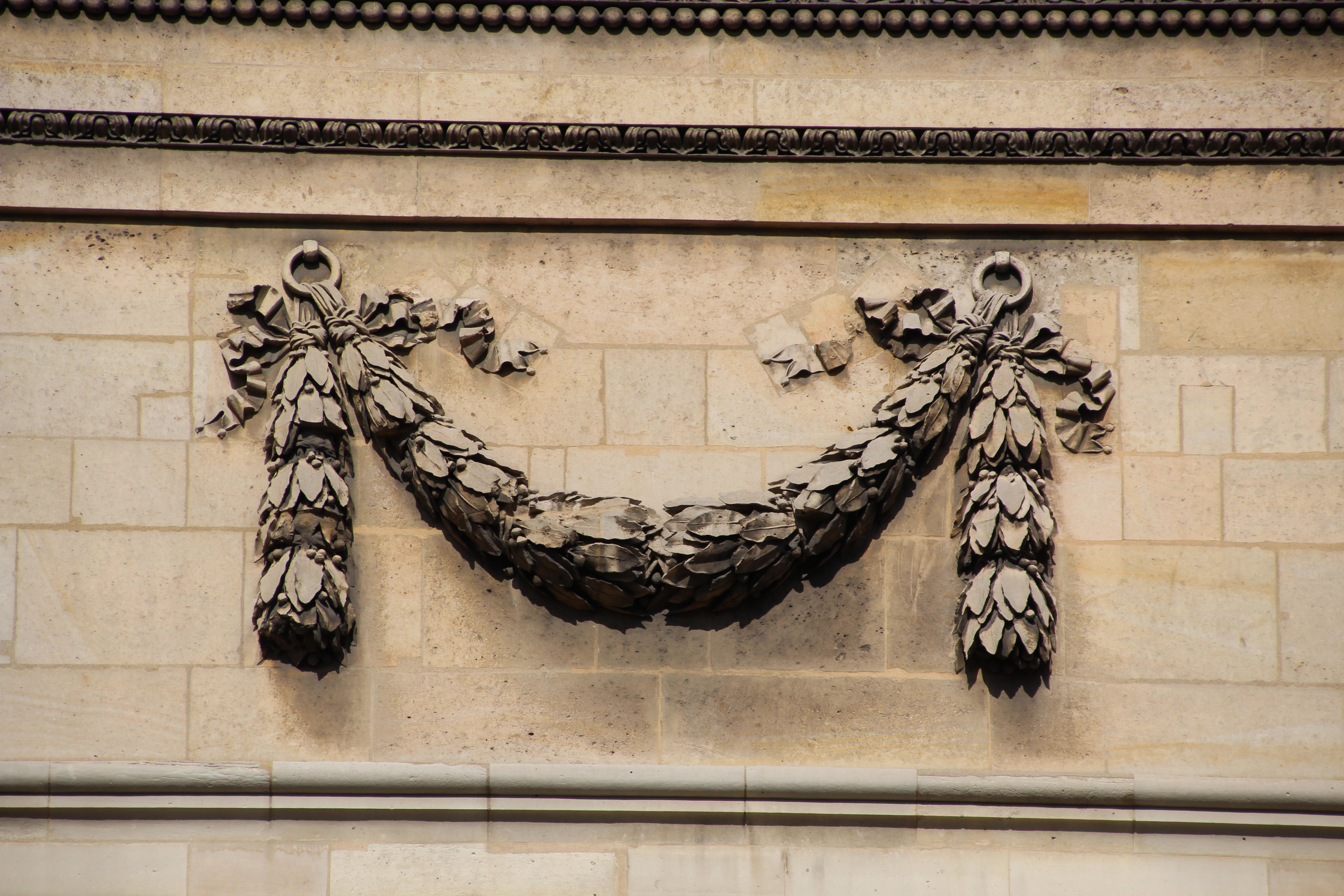
Festoon of the Panthéon, Paris, by Jacques-Germain Soufflot and Jean-Baptiste Rondelet, 1758–1790

A festoon (from French feston, Italian festone, from a Late Latin festo, originally a festal garland, Latin festum, feast) is a wreath or garland hanging from two points, and in architecture typically a carved ornament depicting conventional arrangement of flowers, foliage or fruit bound together and suspended by ribbons. The motif is sometimes known as a swag when depicting fabric or linen.

In modern English the verb forms, especially "festooned with", are often used very loosely or figuratively to mean having any type of fancy decoration or covering.

== Origins and design ==
The festoon probably originates in stone representations of garlands of natural flowers, which were hung up over an entrance doorway on holidays, or suspended around an altar.

The design was widely employed both by the Ancient Greeks and Romans, and formed the principal decoration of altars, friezes and panels. The ends of the ribbons are sometimes formed into bows or twisted curves; when in addition a group of foliage or flowers is suspended, it is called a drop or margent.

The motif was later used in Neoclassical architecture and decorative arts, especially ceramics and the work of silversmiths. Variations on the exact design are plentiful; for example, the ribbons can be suspended either from a decorated knot, or held in the mouths of lions, or suspended across the tops of bucrania as in the Temple of Vesta at Tivoli.

== Gallery ==
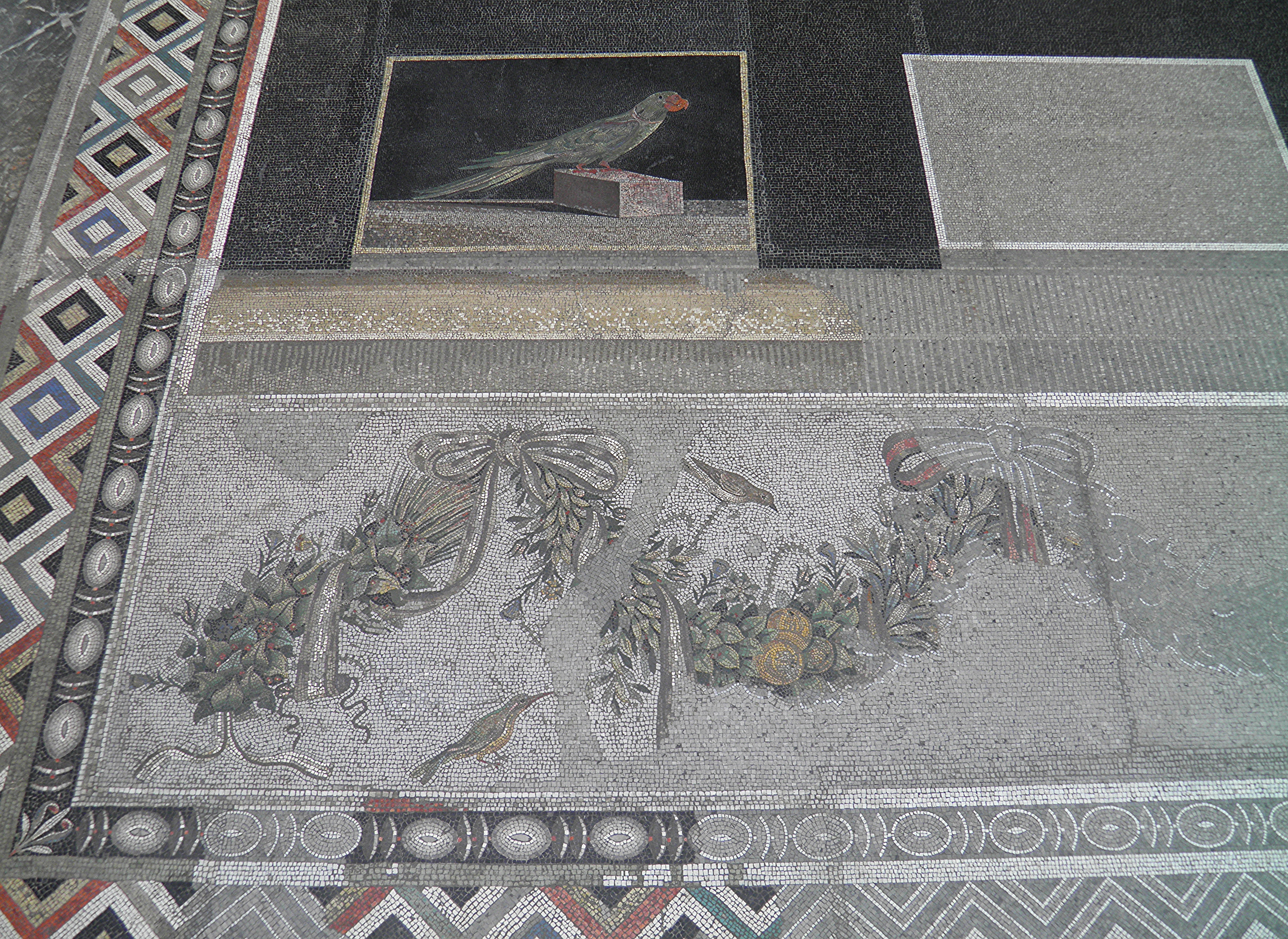
Detail of an Ancient Greek mosaic floor, Pergamon Museum, Berlin, Germany, unknown architect, 2nd century BC

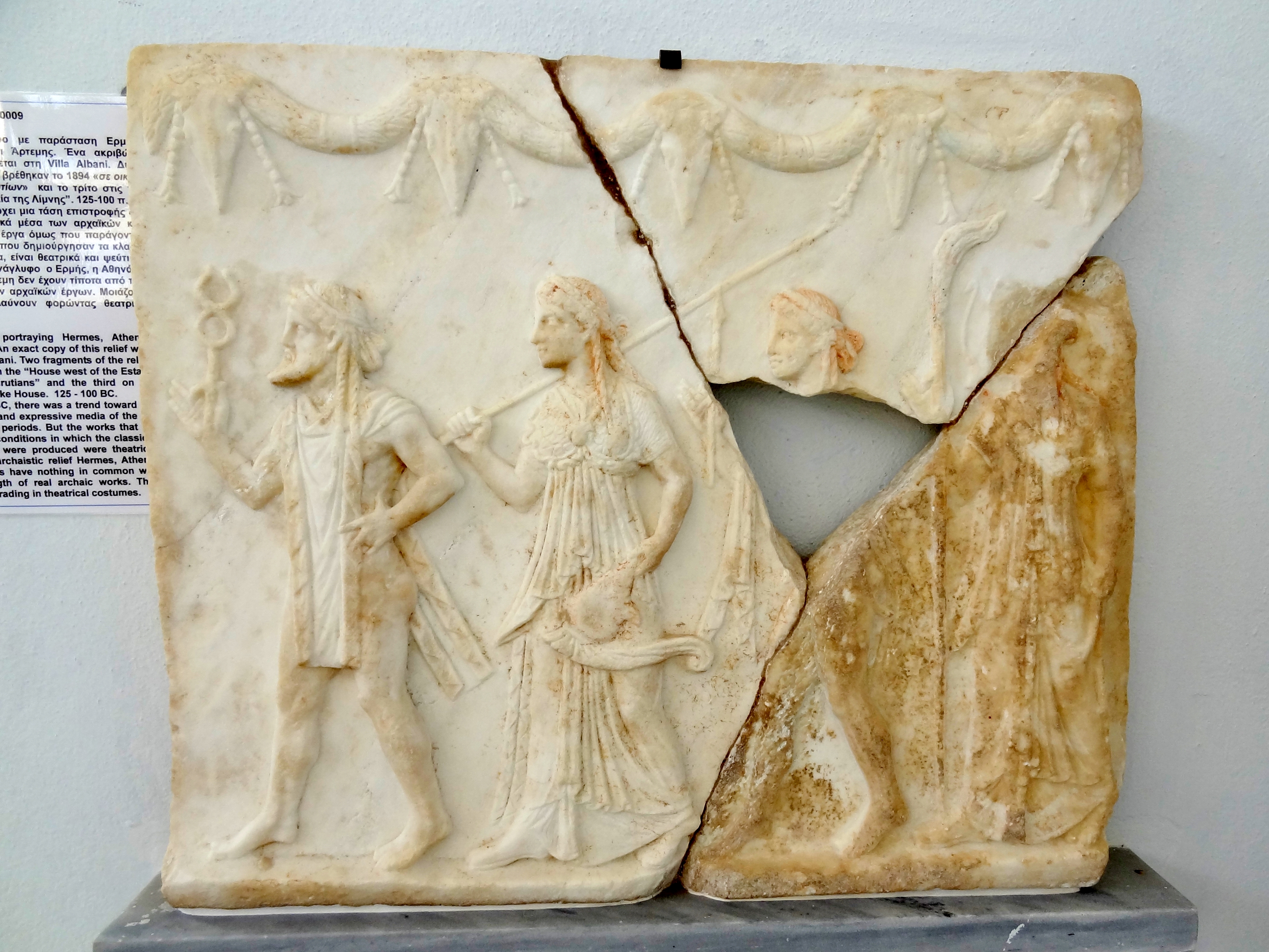
Ancient Greek festoons with bucrania on a relief with Hermes, Athena, Apollo and Artemis, 125-100 BC, marble, Archaeological Museum of Delos, Delos, Greece

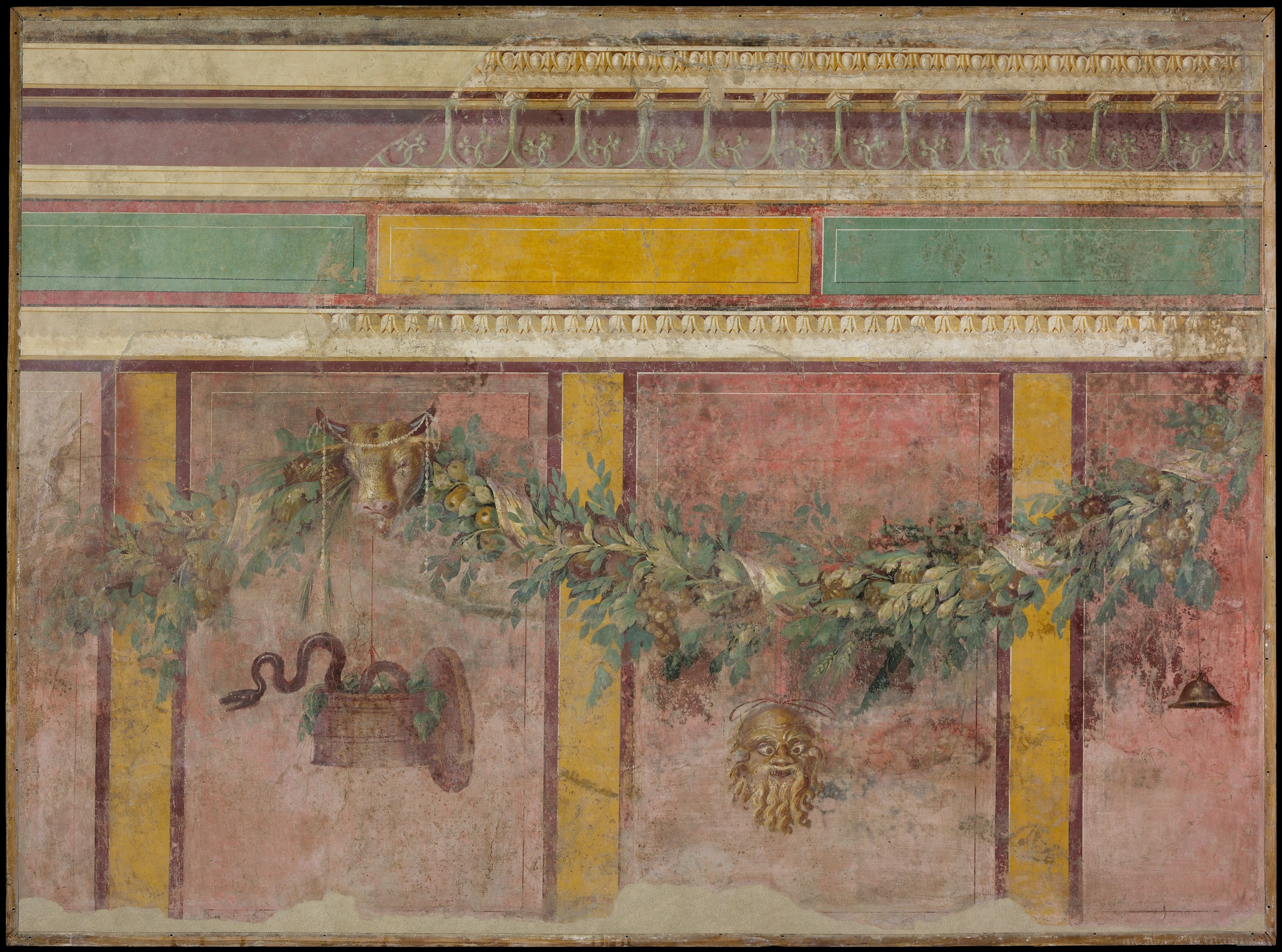
Roman trompe-l'œil wall painting from a villa, with festoons and bucrania, c.50-40 BC, fresco, Metropolitan Museum of Art, New York

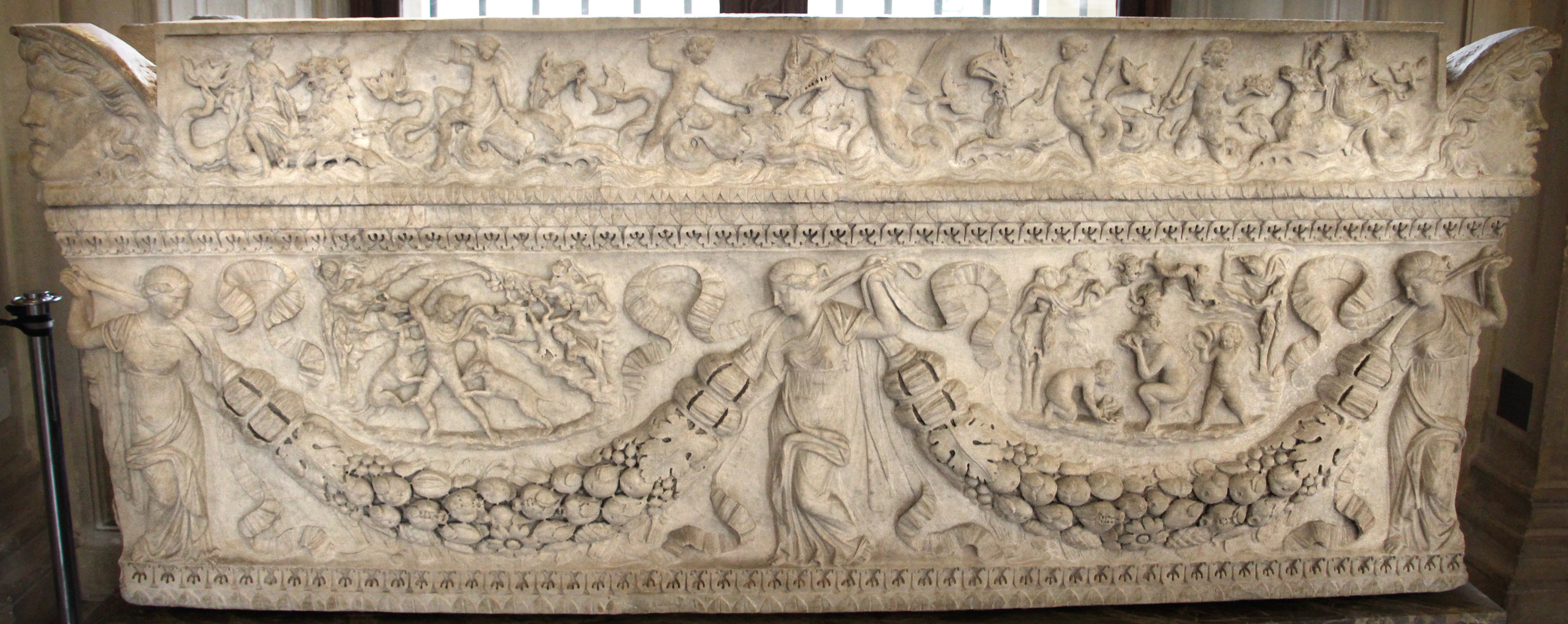
Highly decorated Roman sarcophagus with festoons, c.125-130 AD, marble, Louvre

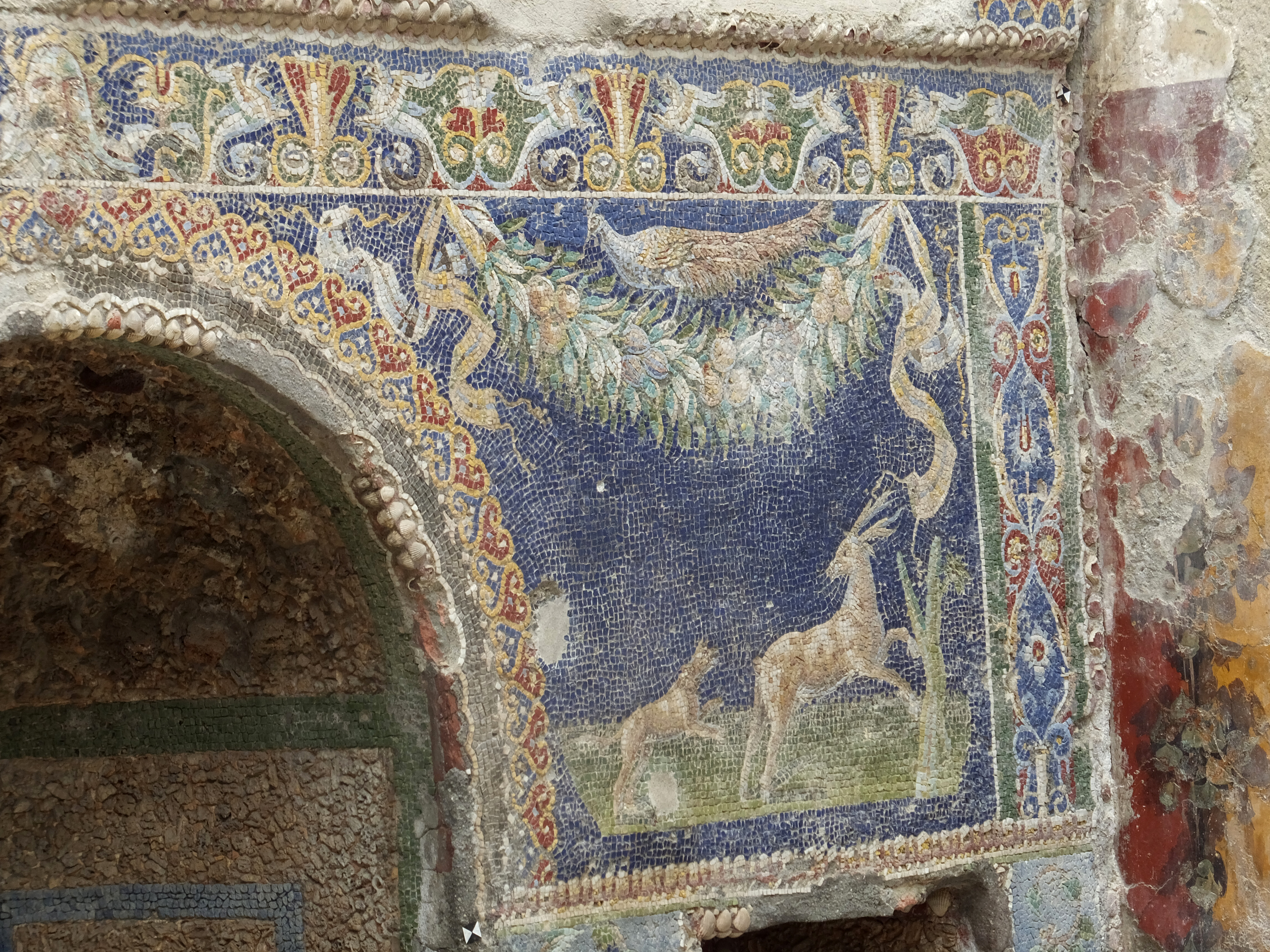
Roman festoon, c.70 BC, mosaic, Casa di Nettuno e Anfitrite, Herculaneum Archaeological Park, Ercolano, Italy

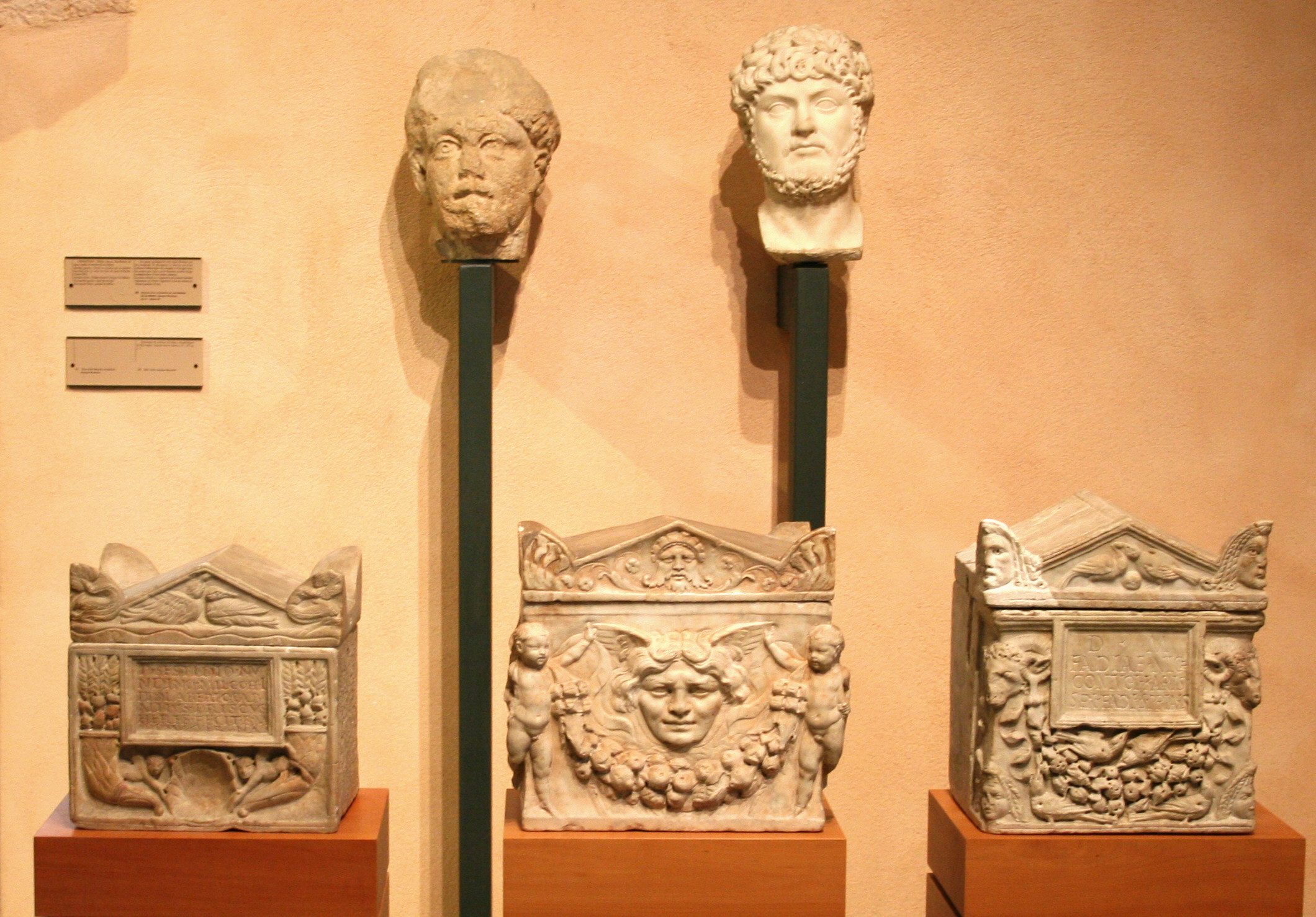
Festoons on Roman cremation urns, 2nd century AD, marble, Musée d'archéologie méditerranéenne, Marseille, France

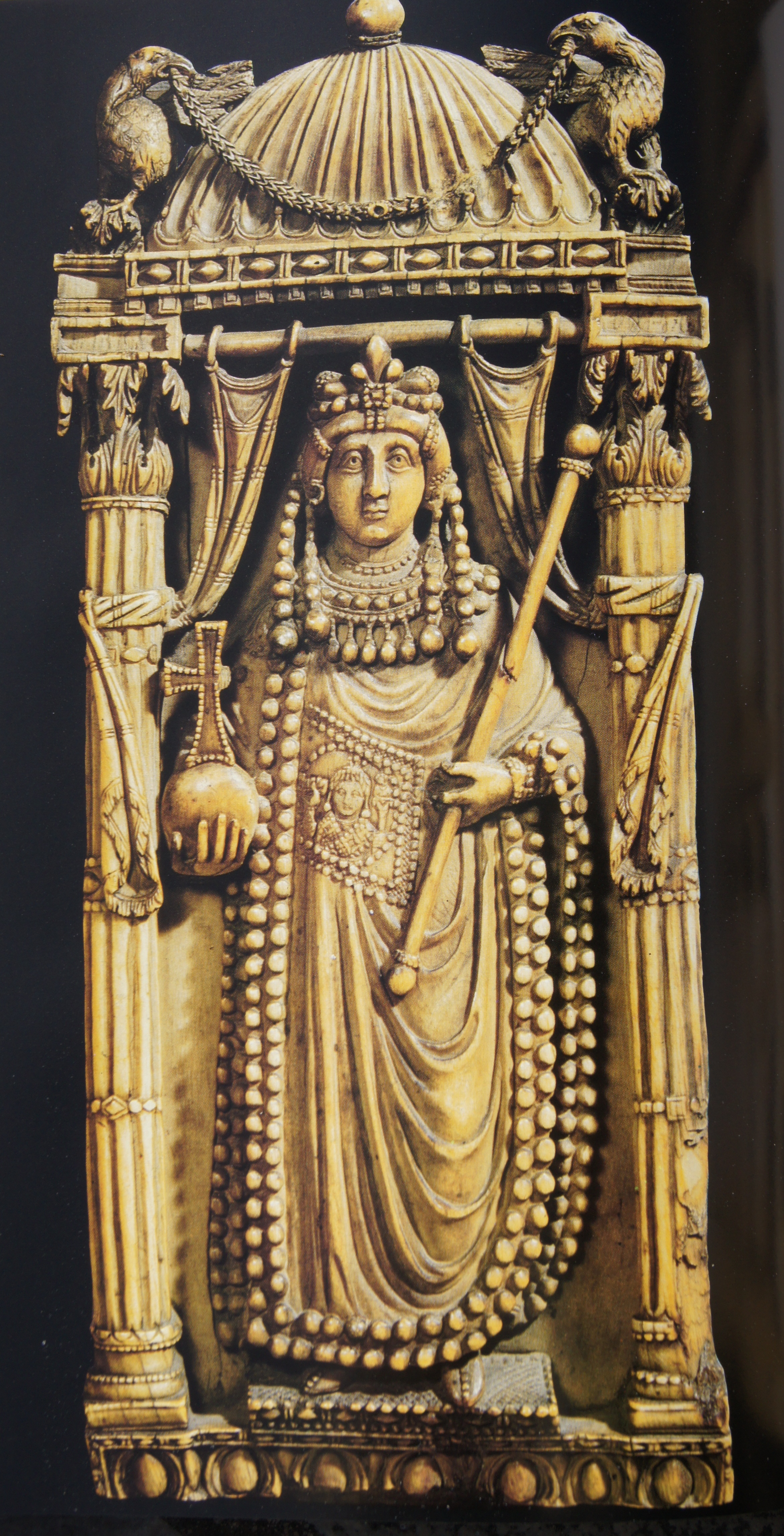
Byzantine festoon at the top of a relief of Empress Ariadne, c.500, ivory, National Bargello Museum, Florence, Italy

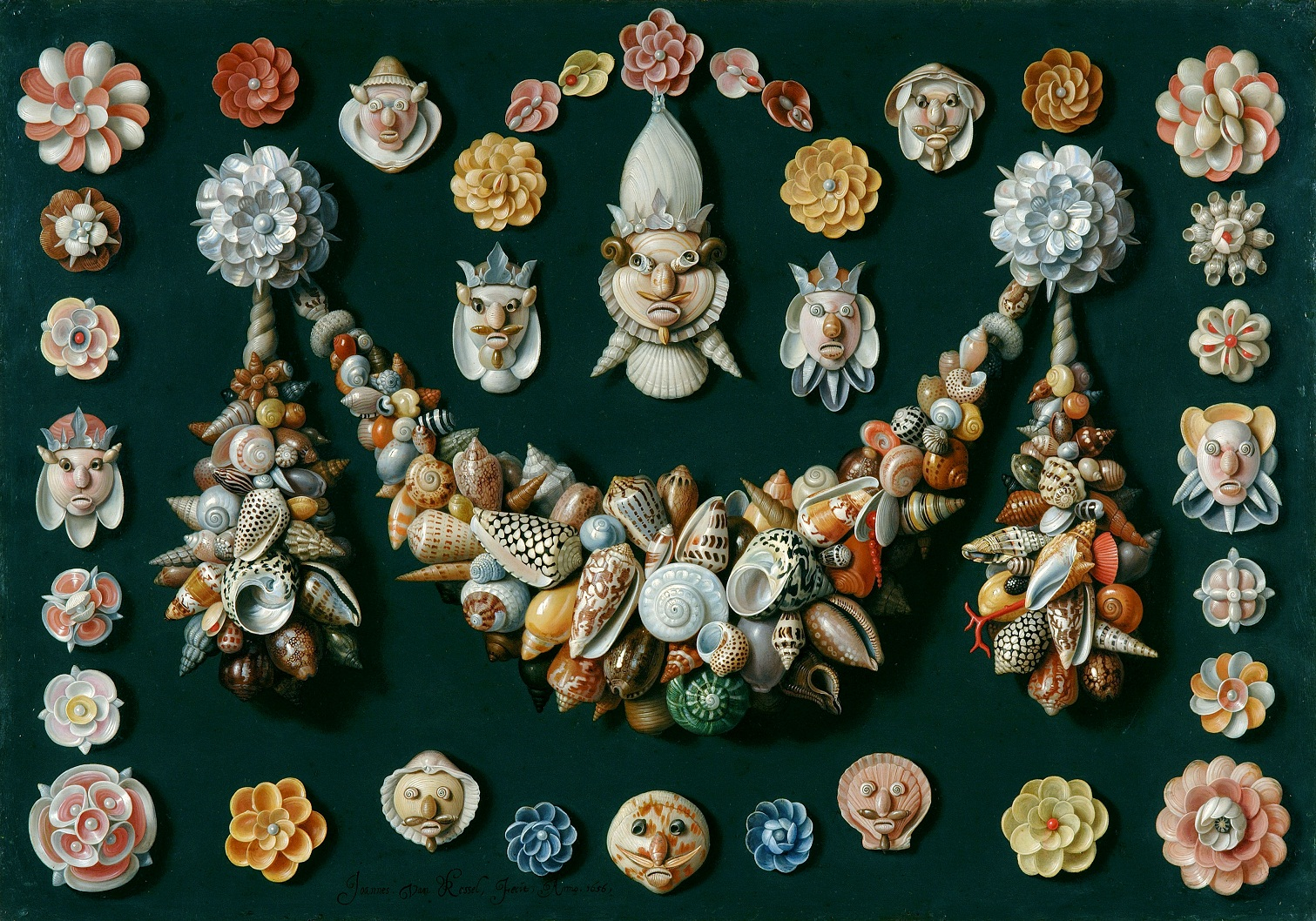
Festoon, masks and rosettes made of shells, by Jan van Kessel the Elder, 17th century, color on copper, Fondation Custodia, Paris

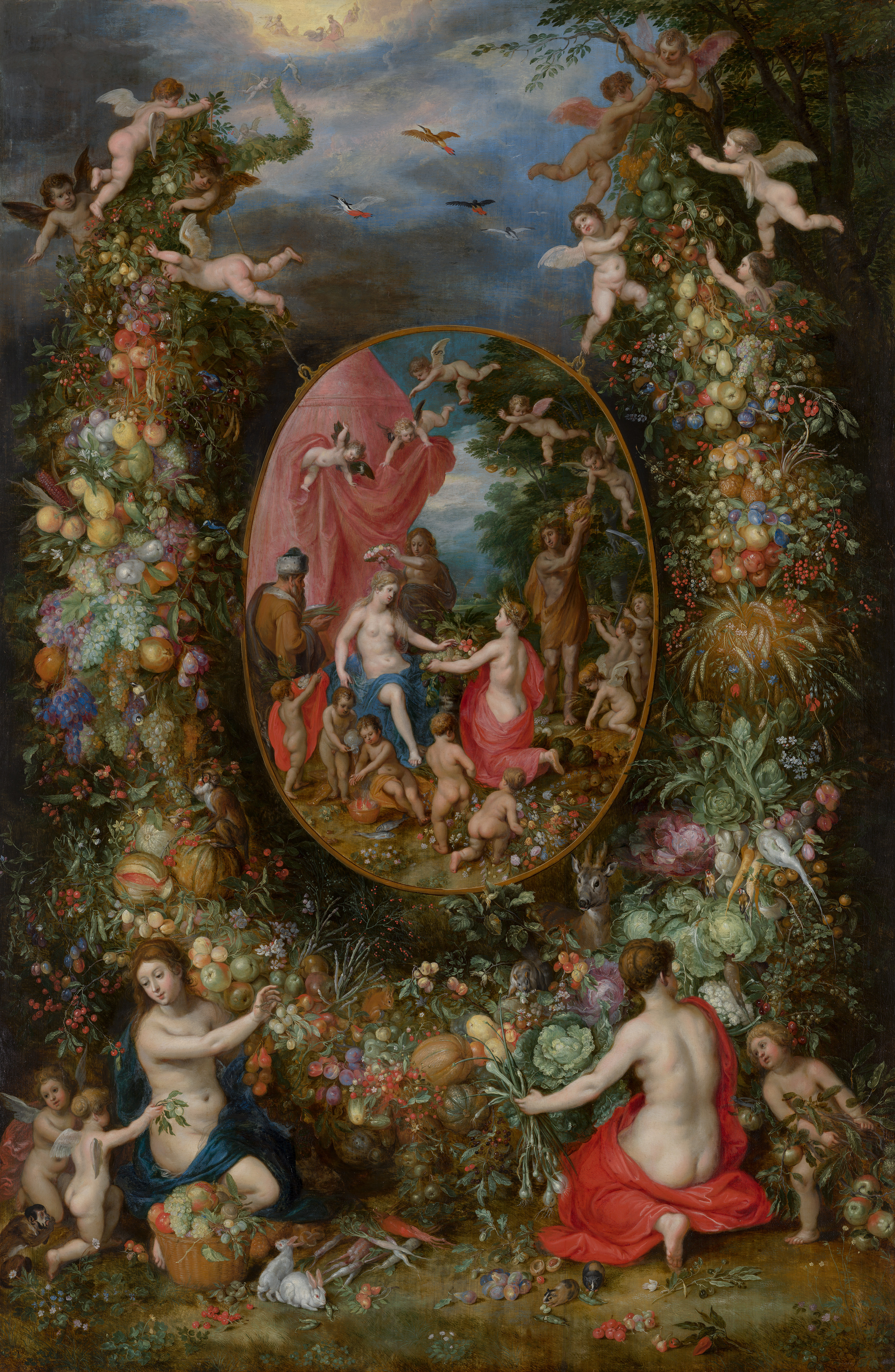
Garland of Flowers around an Allegory of Farming, by Jan Brueghel the Elder and Hendrick van Balen the Elder, 1615, oil on panel, Mauritshuis, The Hague, the Netherlands

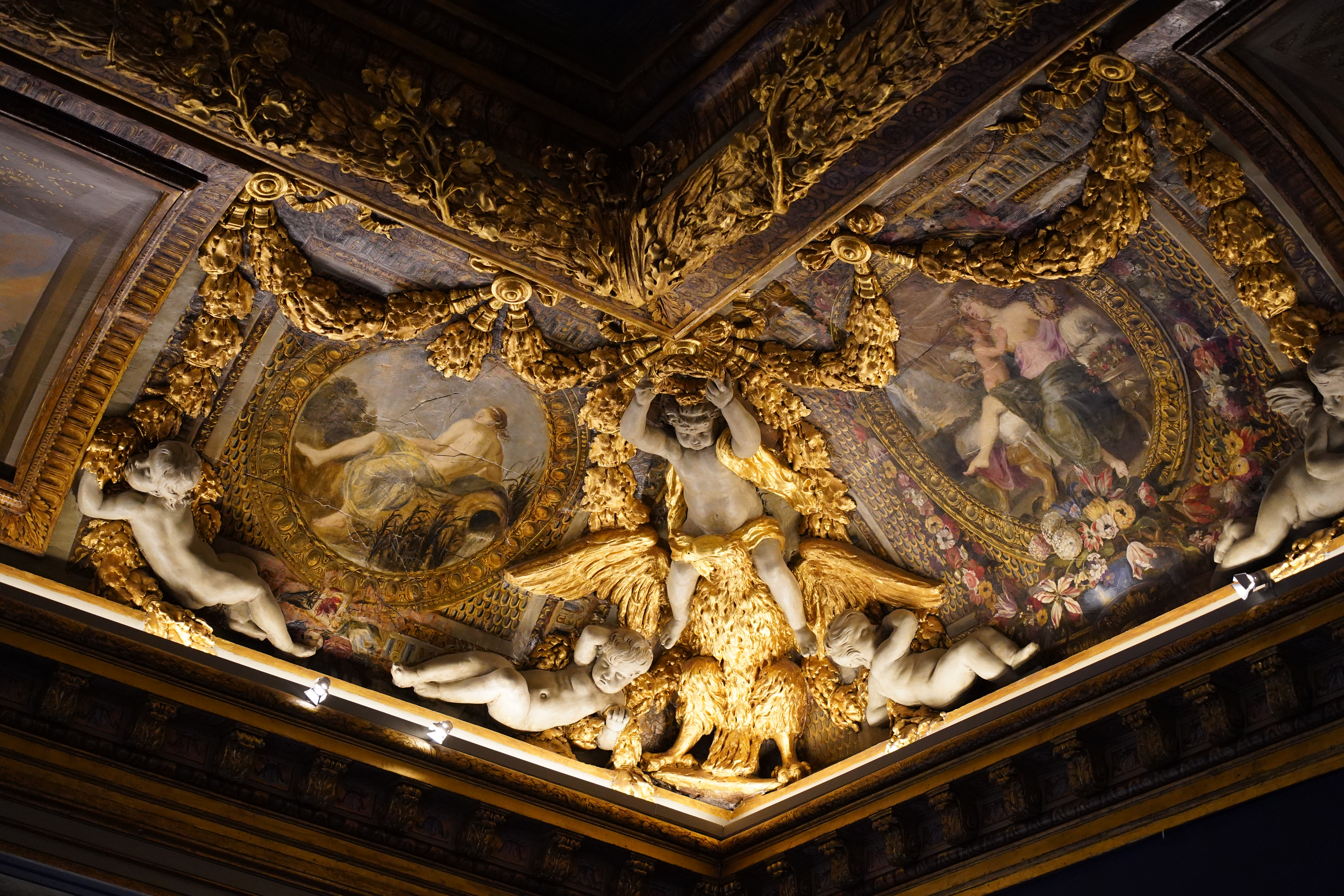
Baroque festoons on the boiserie of a room from the Hôtel Colbert de Villacerf, now in the Musée Carnavalet, Paris, unknown architect, sculptor and painter, c.1650

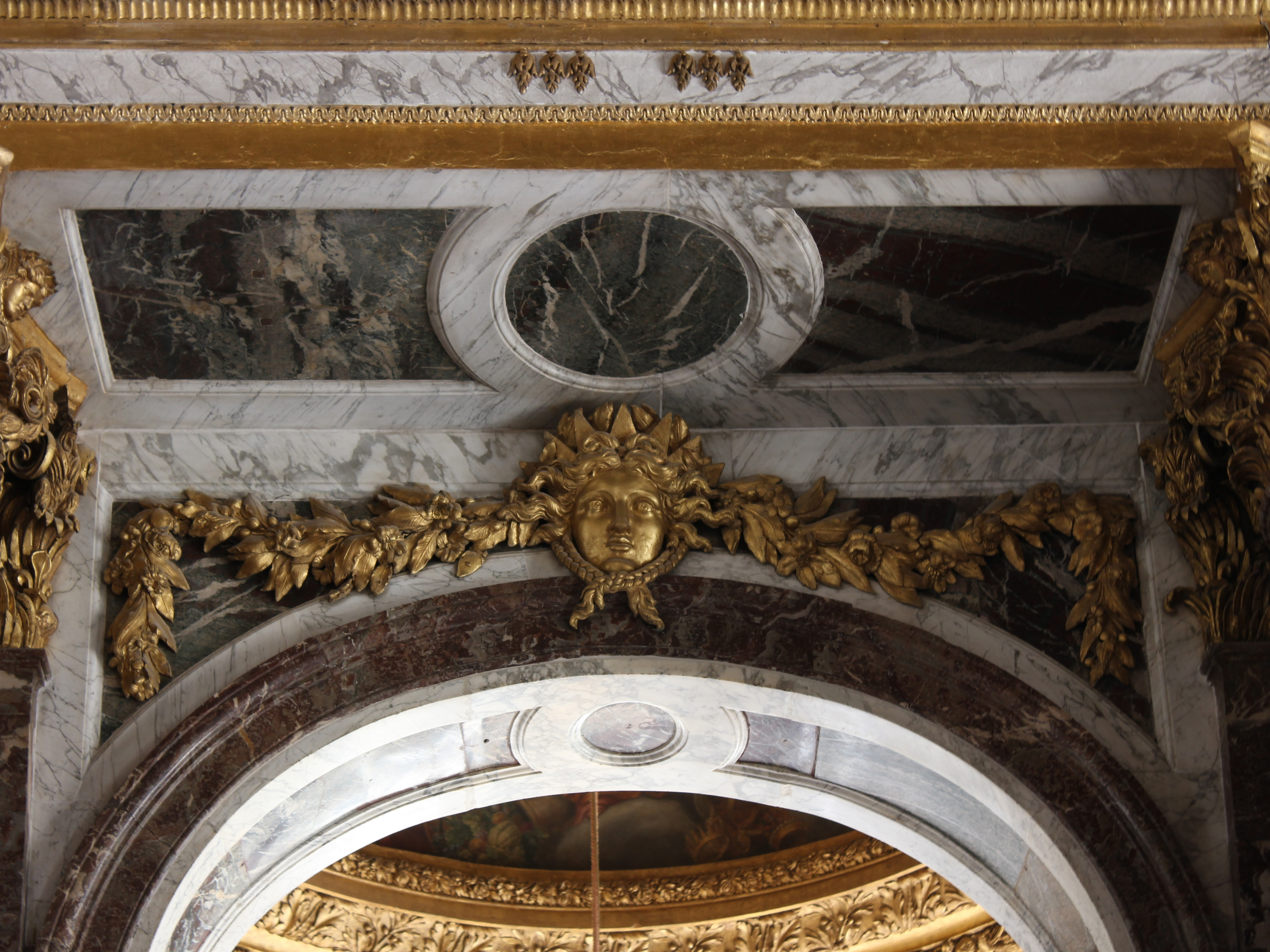
Baroque festoon with a mascaron in the Hall of Mirrors of the Palace of Versailles, Versailles, France, designed by Jules Hardouin-Mansart, 1678-1684

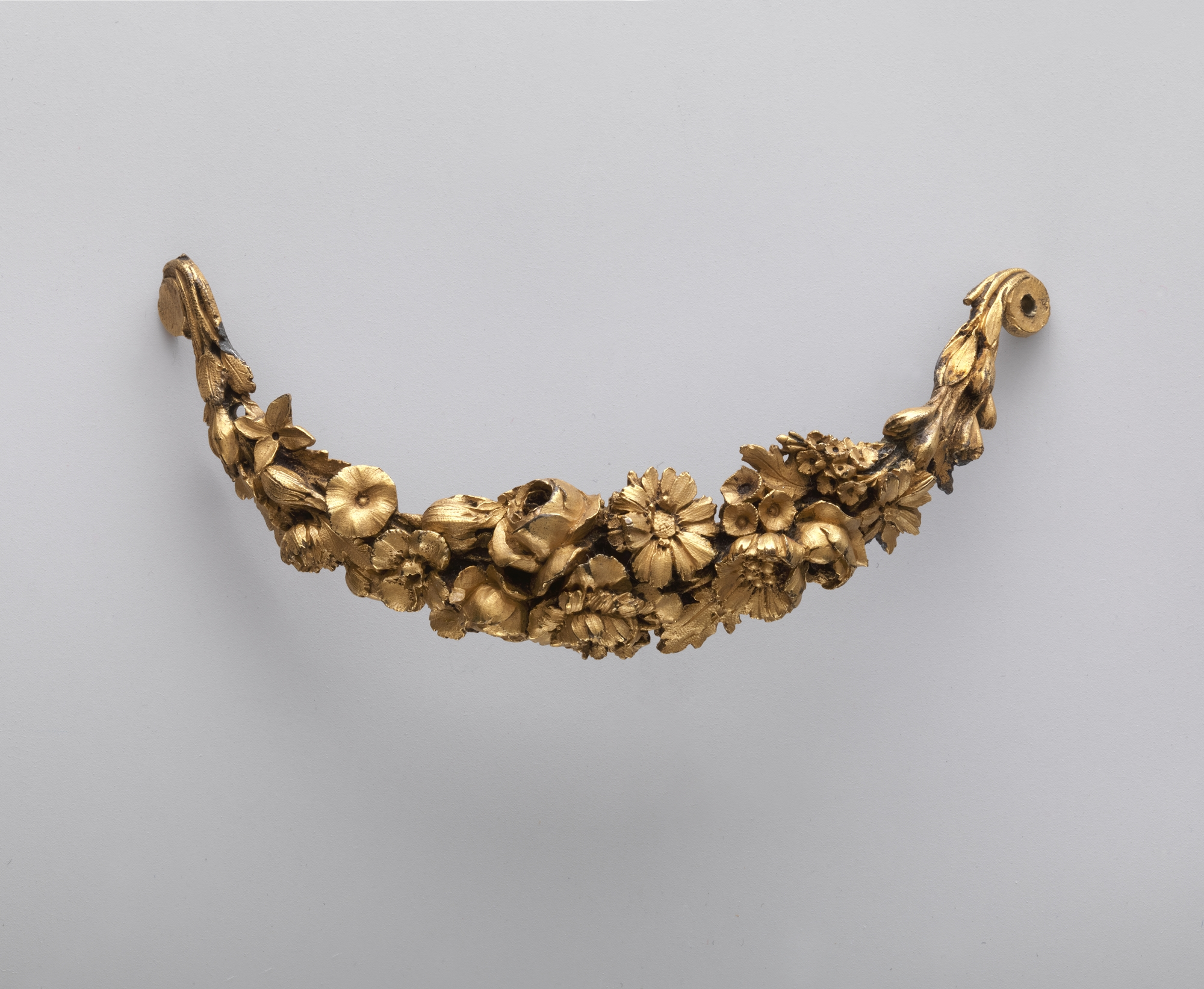
Rococo or Louis XVI style festoon ornament, 18th century, gilt bronze, Metropolitan Museum of Art

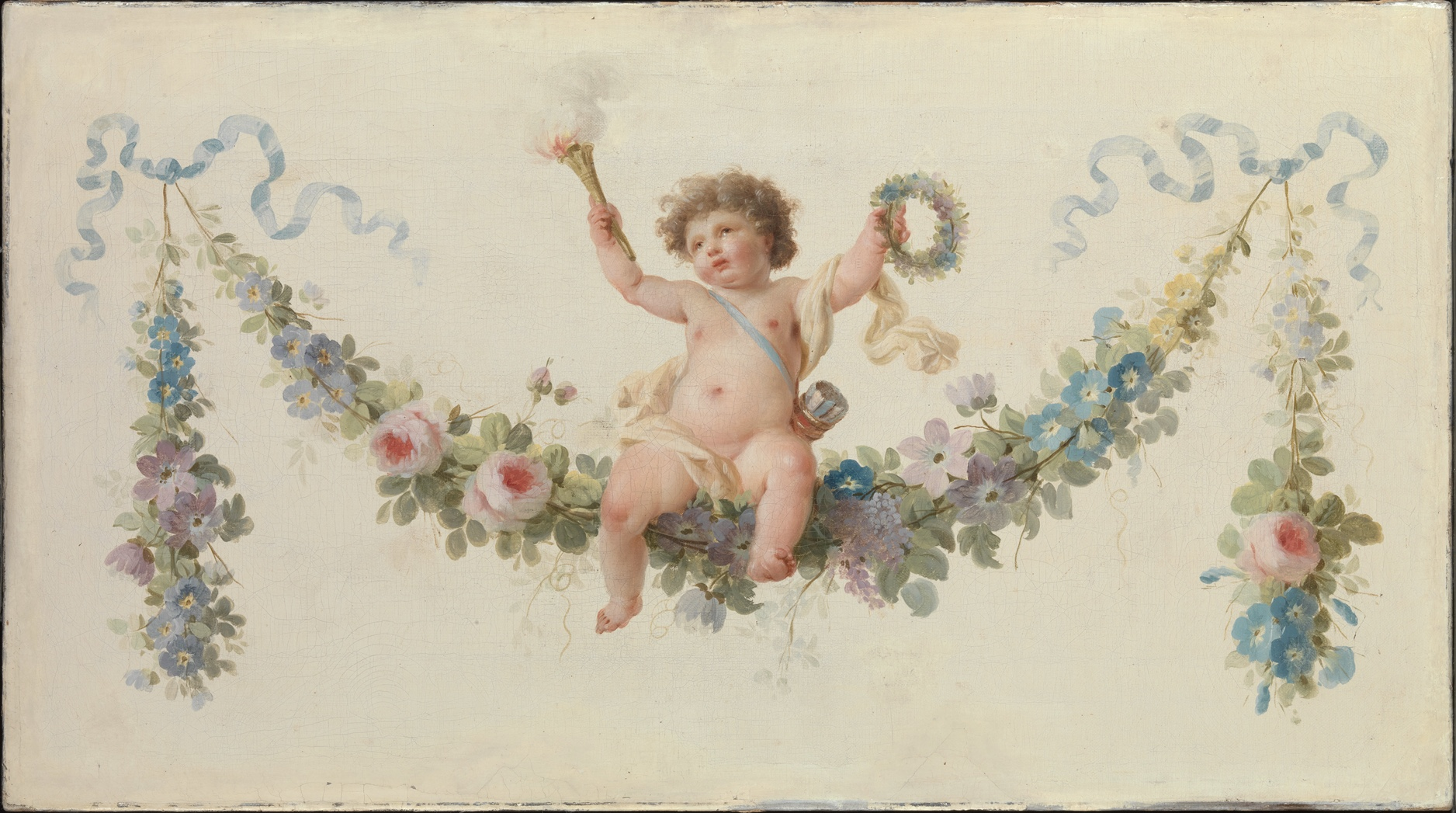
Louis XVI style Cupid seated on a festoon made of flowers, c.1770-1790, oil on canvas, Metropolitan Museum of Art

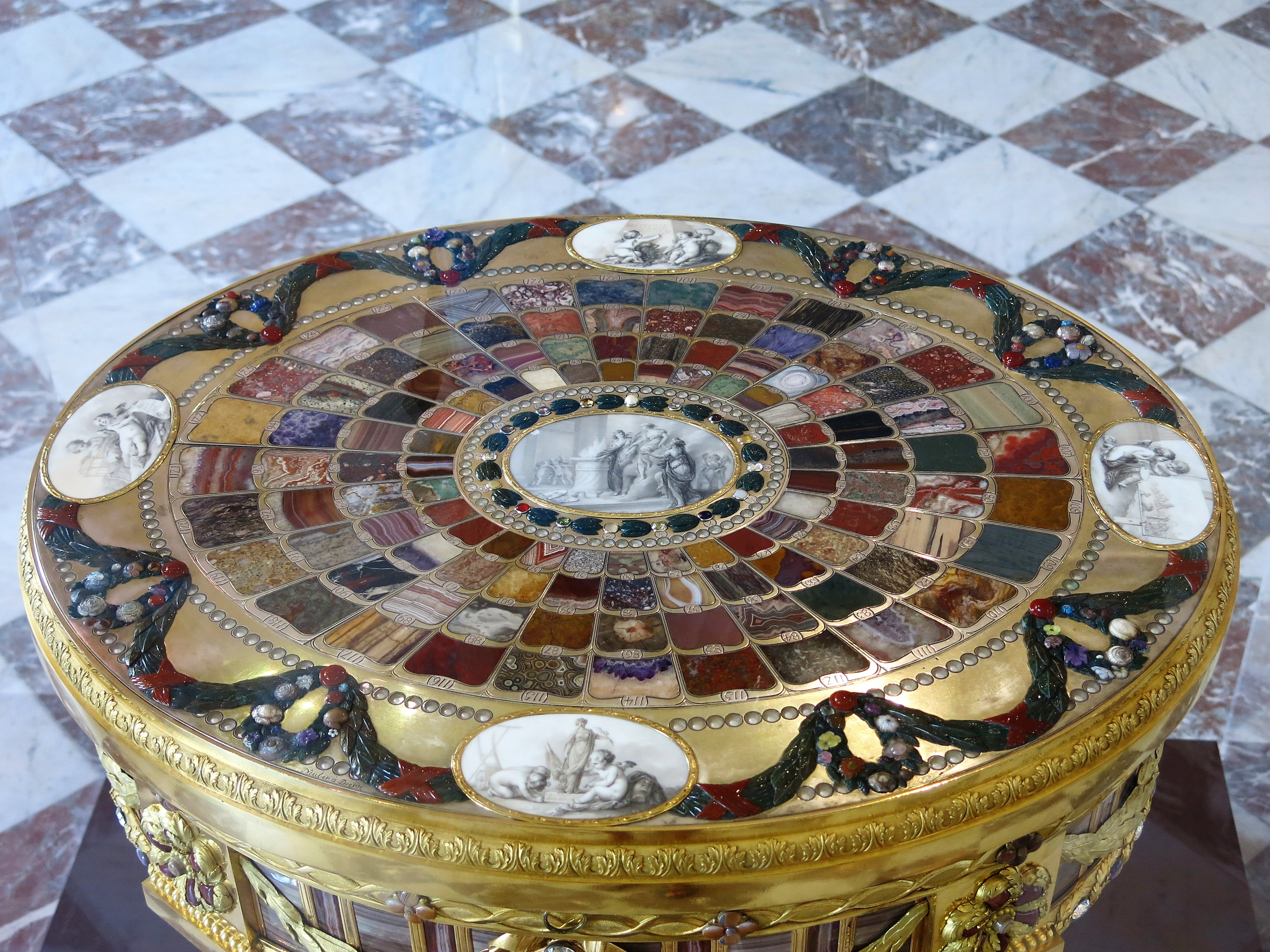
Louis XVI style festoons on the Table de Teschen, by Johann Christian Neuber, 1775–1800, gilt bronze, semiprecious stones, porcelain, and wood, Louvre

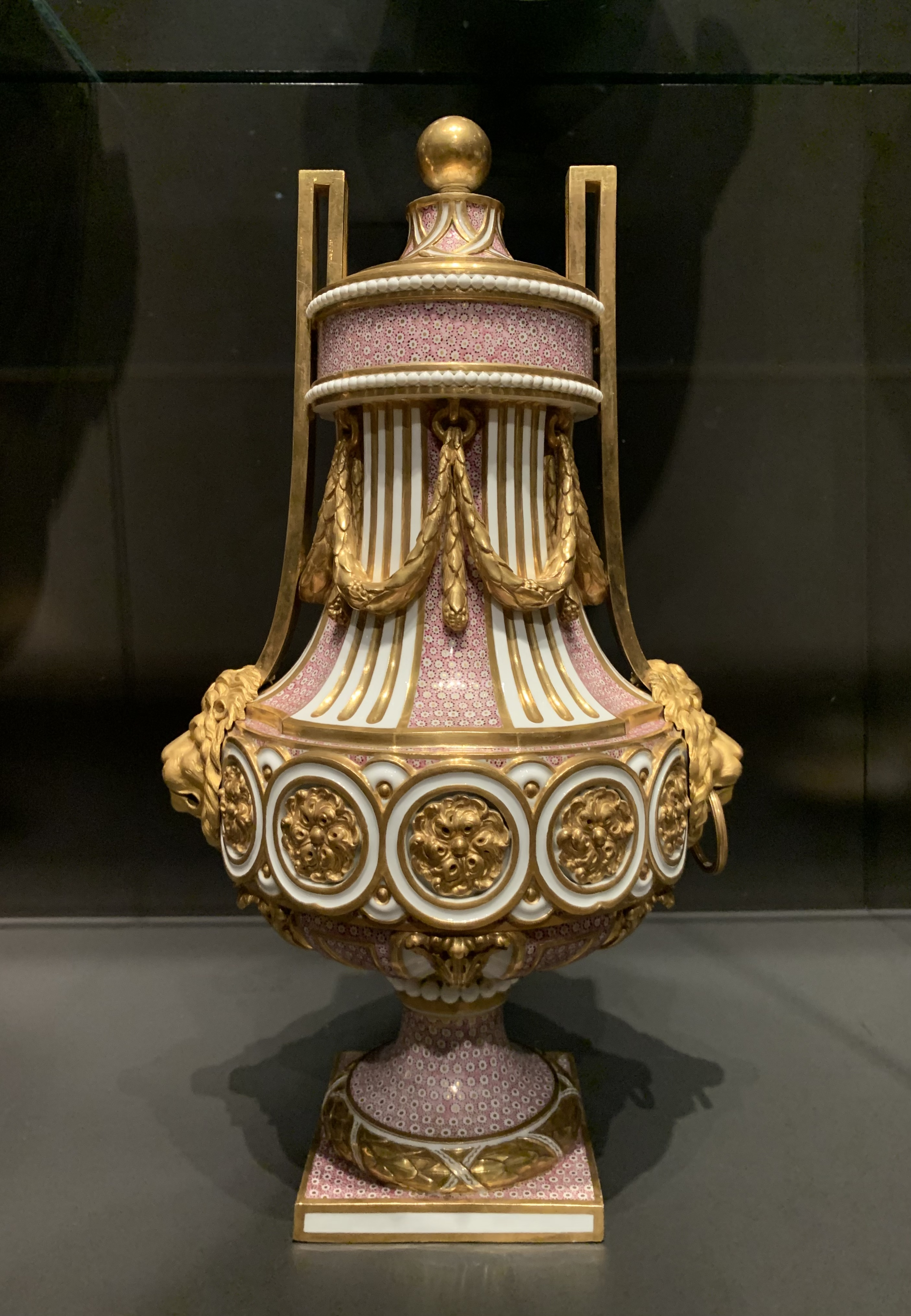
Louis XVI style vase decorated with festoons, design attributed to Jean-Claude Chambellan Duplessis, by the Sèvres porcelain factory, 1780, painted and gilded hard-paste porcelain, gilt bronze, Rijksmuseum Amsterdam, the Netherlands

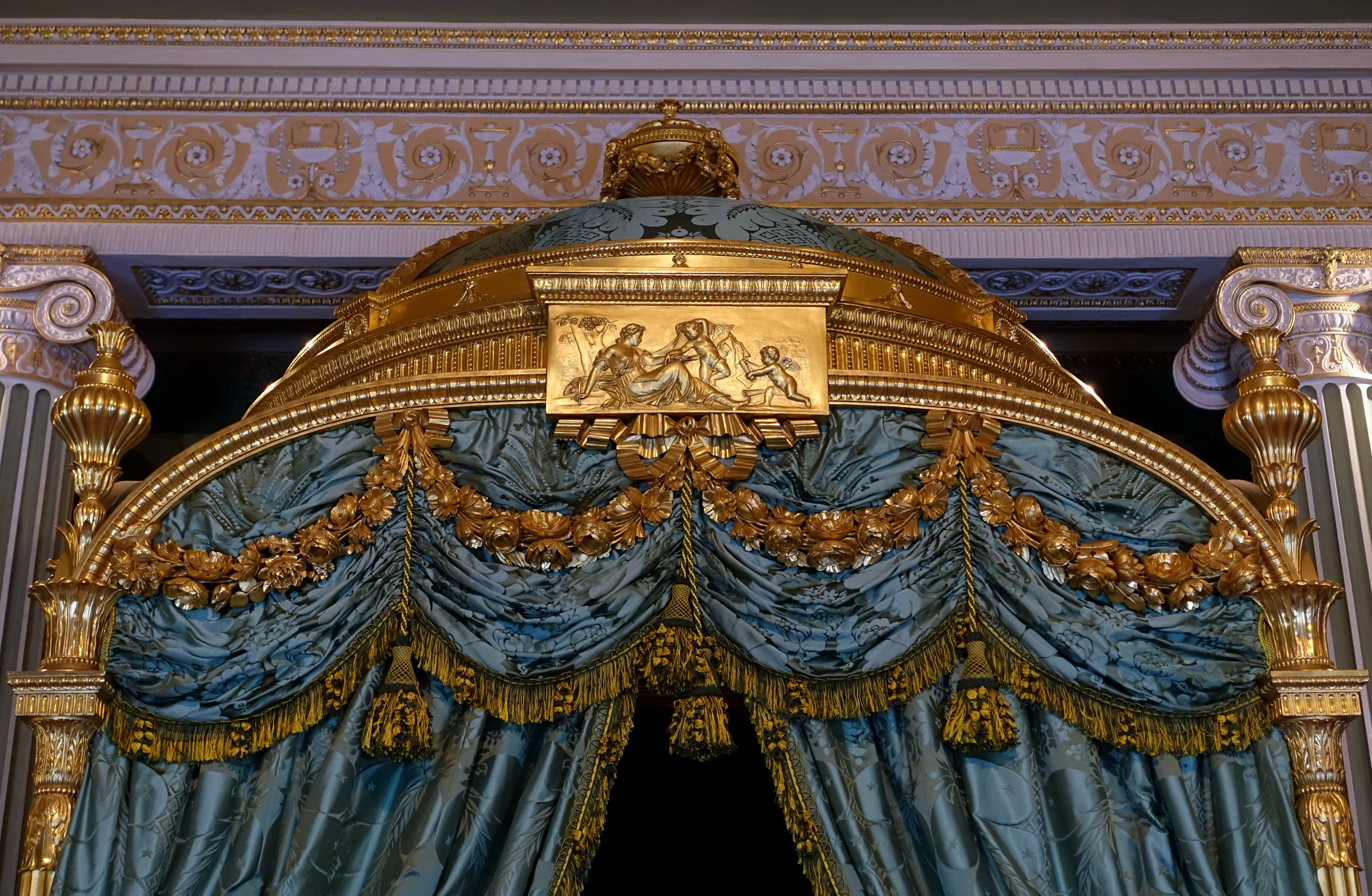
Neoclassical festoons on a bed, by Thomas Chippendale, 1773, carved and gilt wood, Harewood House, Harewood, West Yorkshire, England

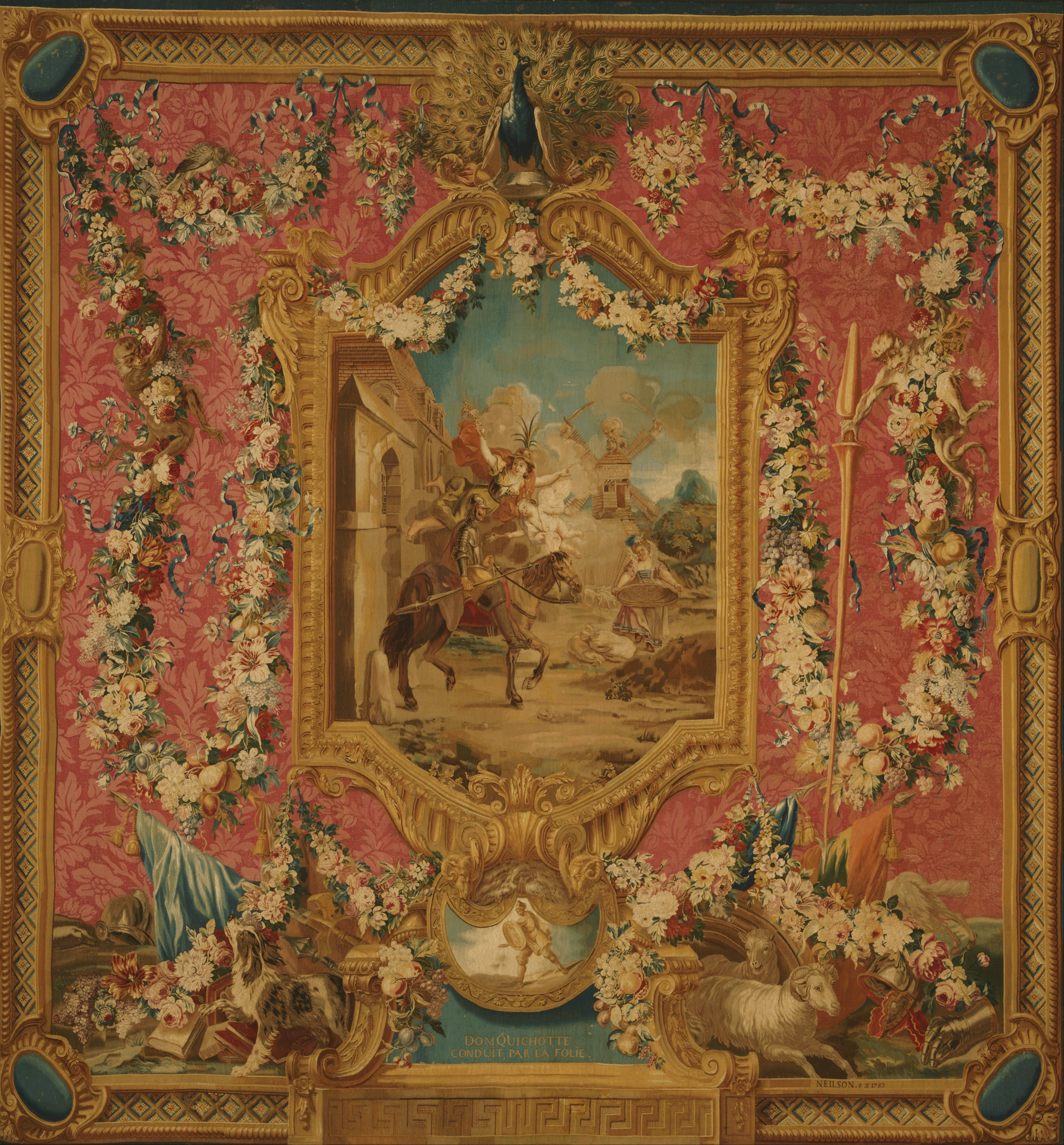
Louis XVI flower festoons on a tapestry showing Don Quixote guided by folly, by the Gobelins Manufactory, 1780–1783, wool and silk, woven on a low-warp loom, Philadelphia Museum of Art, US

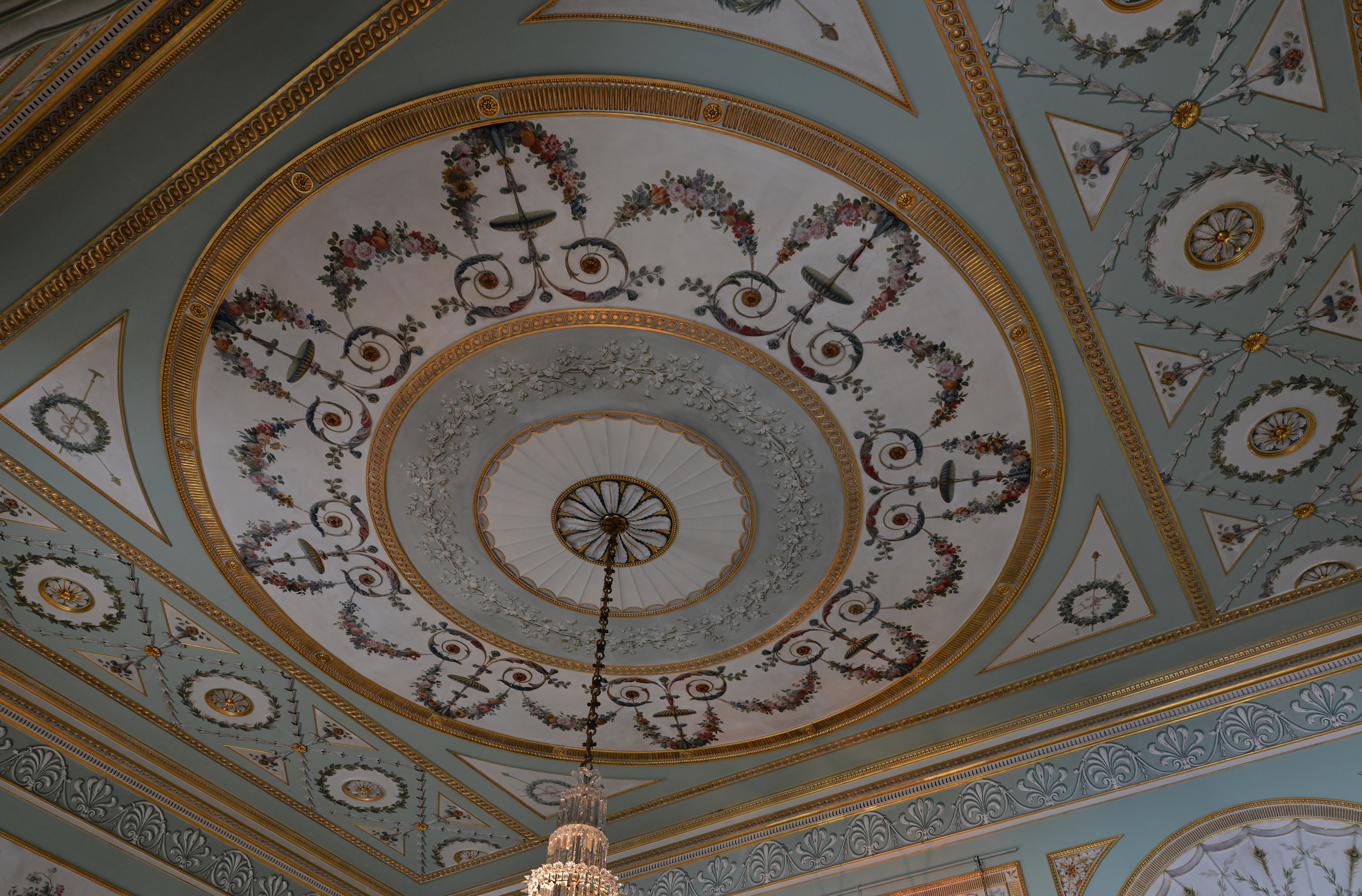
Louis XVI style festoons on a ceiling in the State Dining Room, Inveraray Castle, Scotland, the UK, by Girard and Guinand, 1784

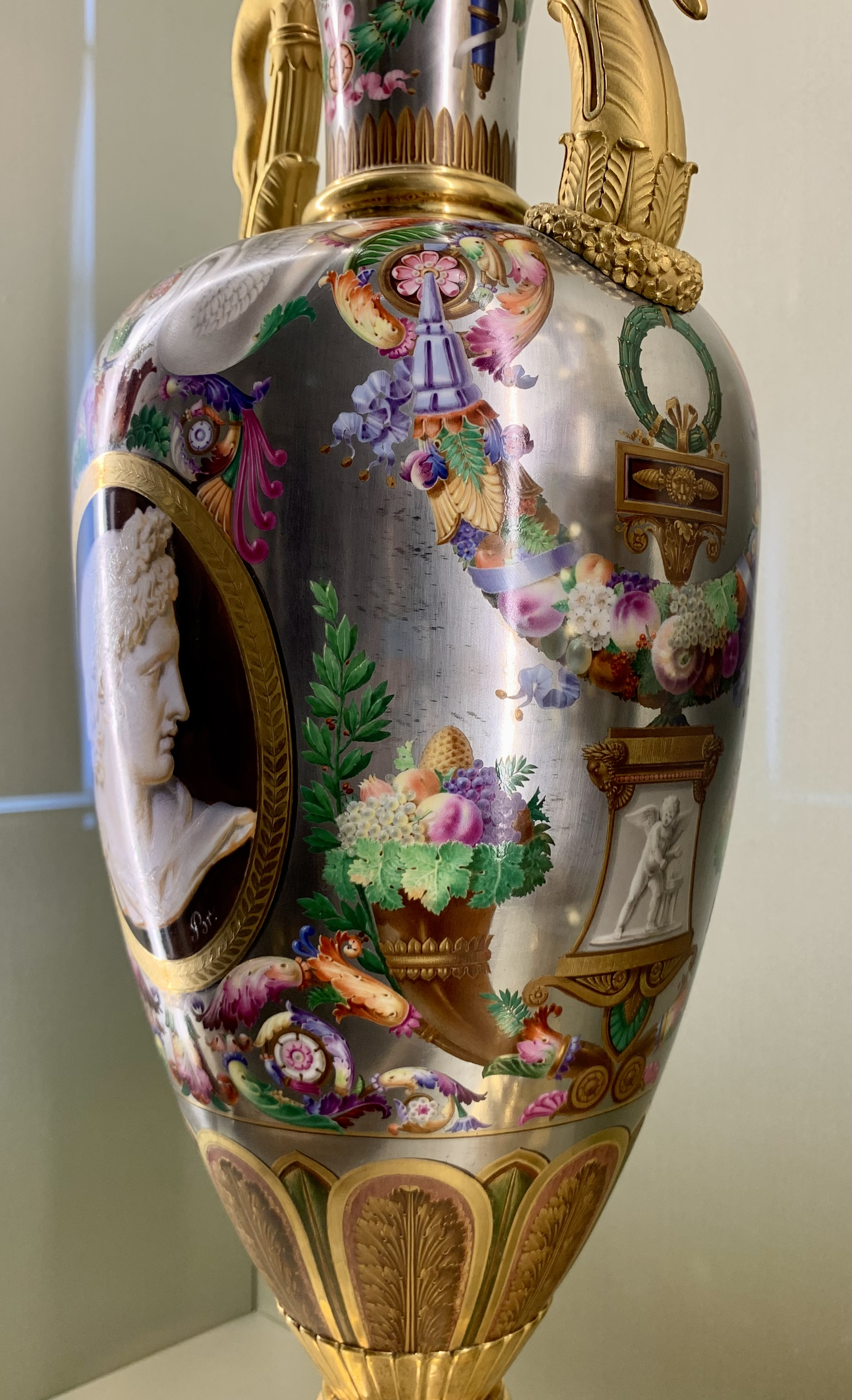
Neoclassical festoon on a vase, by the Sèvres Porcelain Factory, 1814, hard-paste porcelain with platinum background and gilt bronze mounts, Louvre

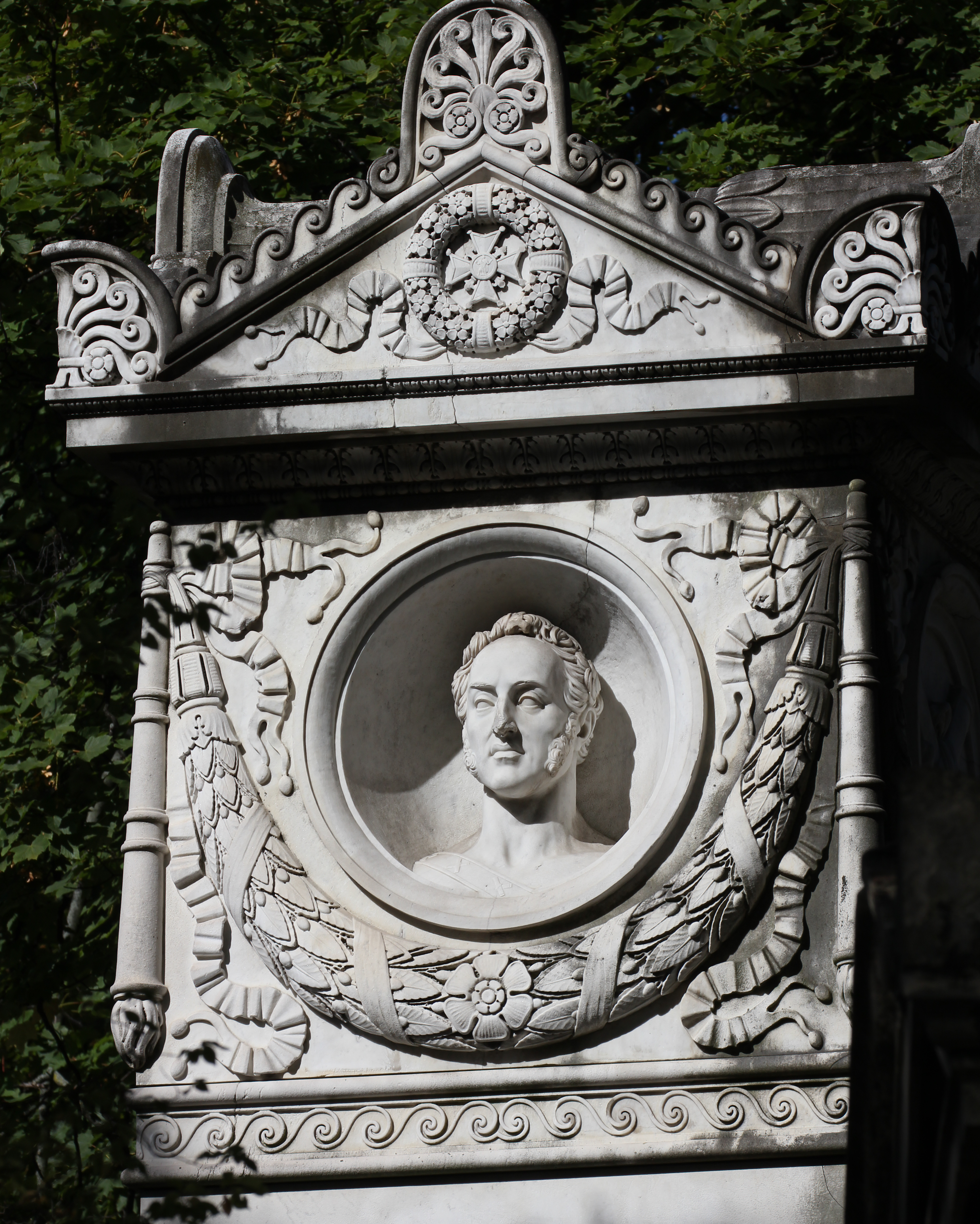
Neoclassical festoon in the Grave of Louis Gabriel Suchet, Père-Lachaise Cemetery, Paris, designed by Louis Visconti, sculpted by Pierre-Jean David and Jean-Baptiste-Louis Plantar, 1826

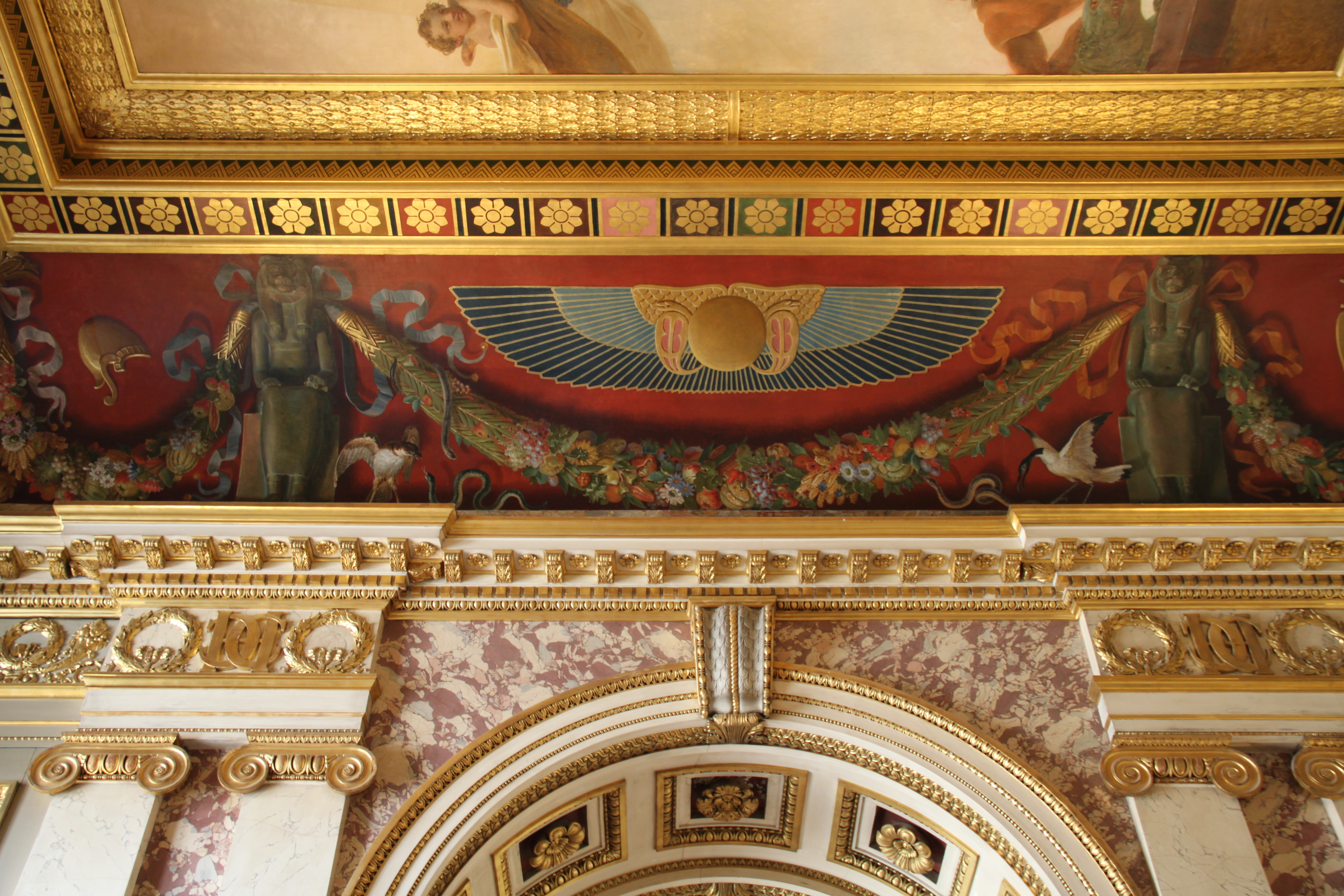
Neoclassical festoons with Egyptian Revival elements around them, on the ceiling of room 644 of the Louvre Palace, unknown painter, c.1840

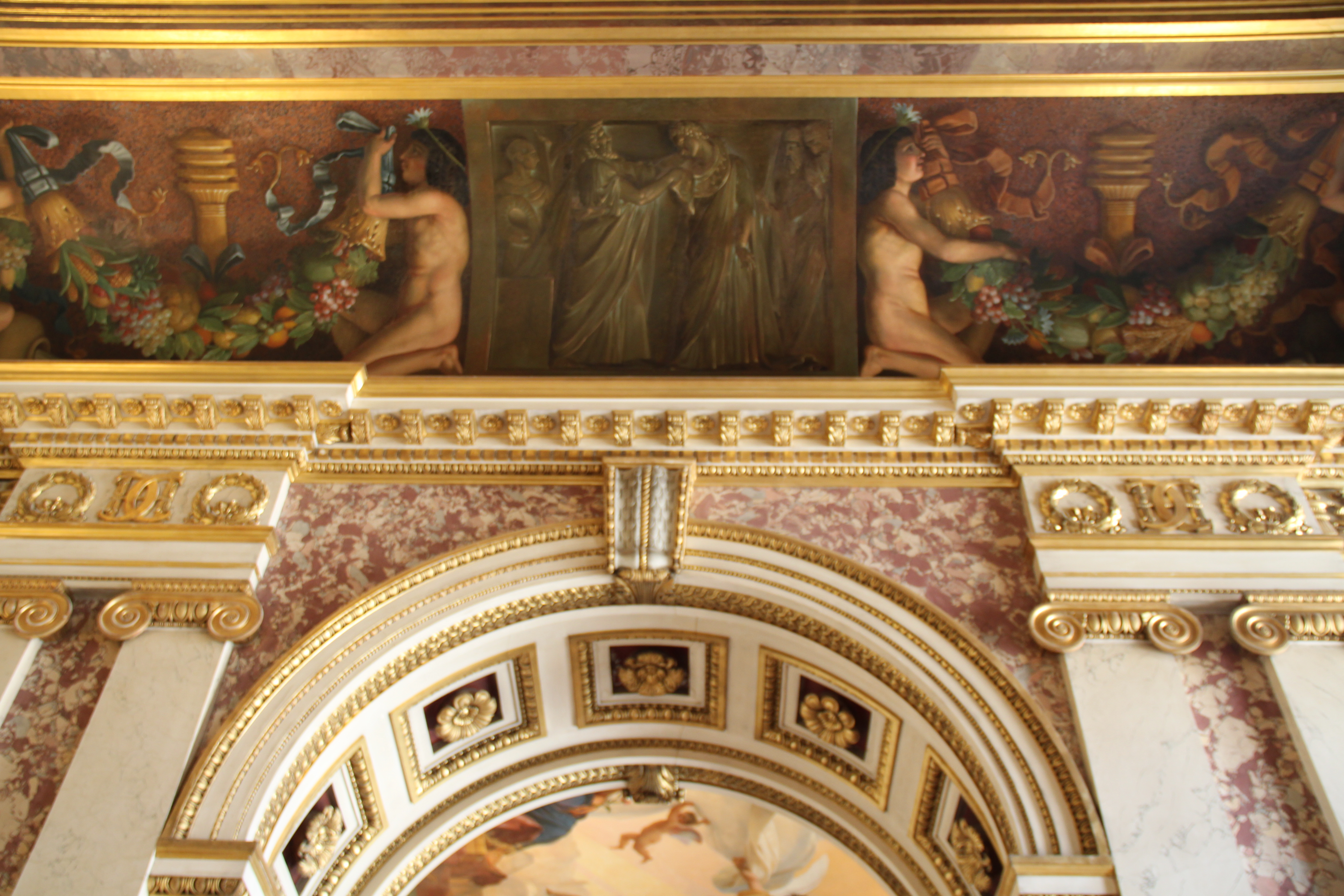
Neoclassical festoon on the ceiling of room 643 of the Louvre Palace, unknown painter, c.1840

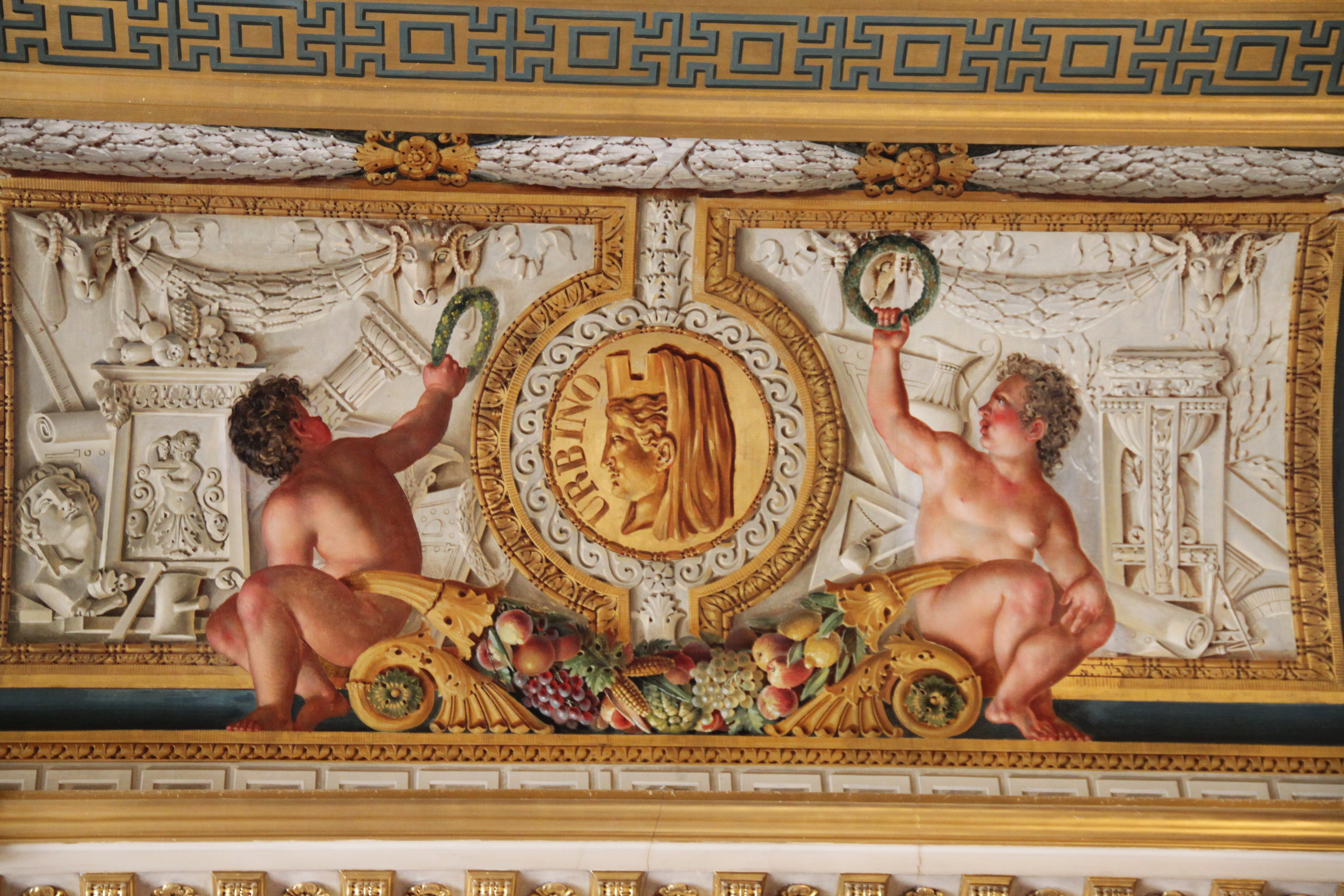
Neoclassical festoon on the ceiling of room 642 of the Louvre Palace, unknown painter, c.1840

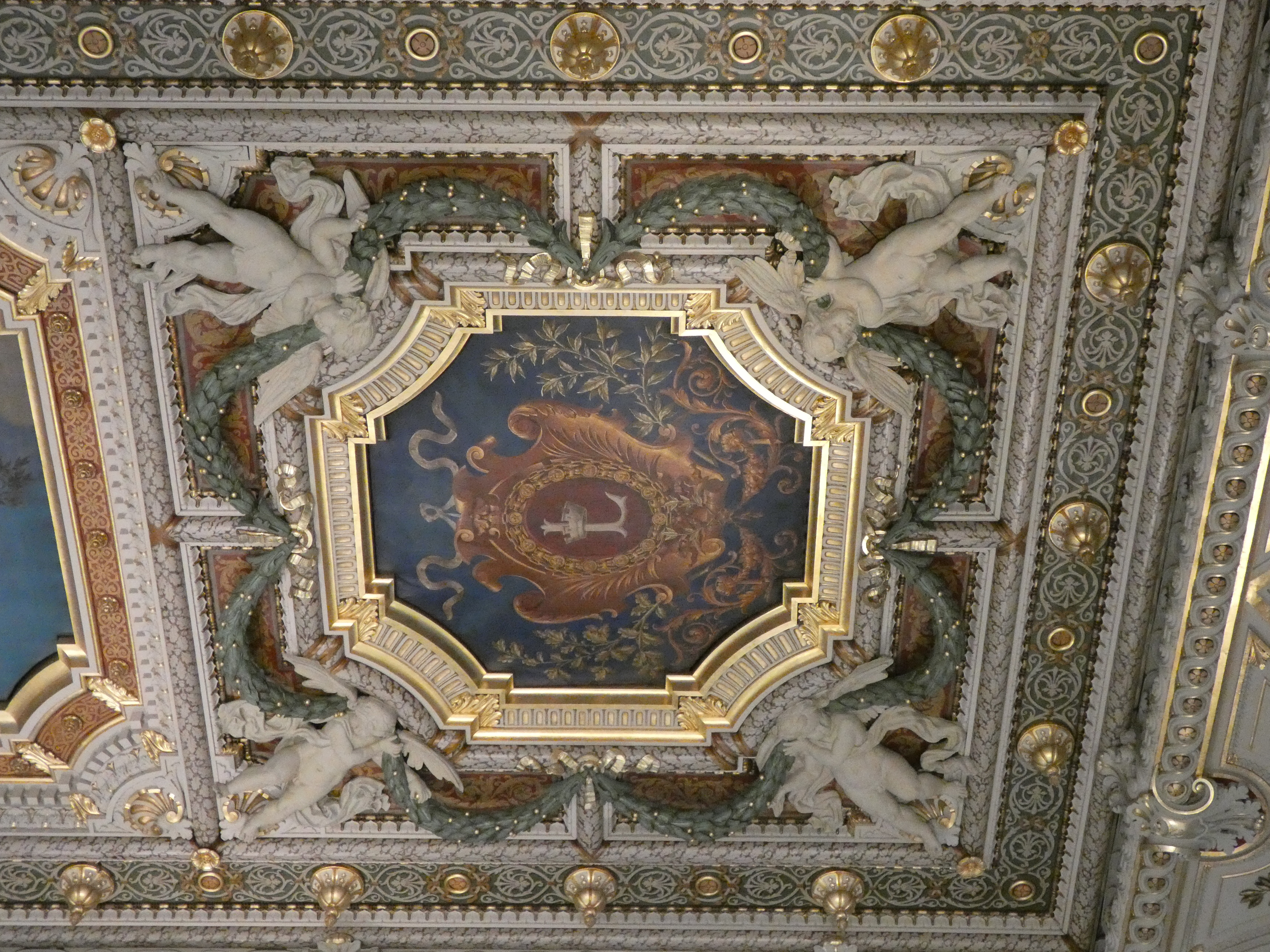
Neoclassical festoons on a ceiling of the Palais de la Bourse, Lyon, France, designed by Alexandre-Dominique Denuelle and sculpted by Guillaume Bonnet, 1855–1862

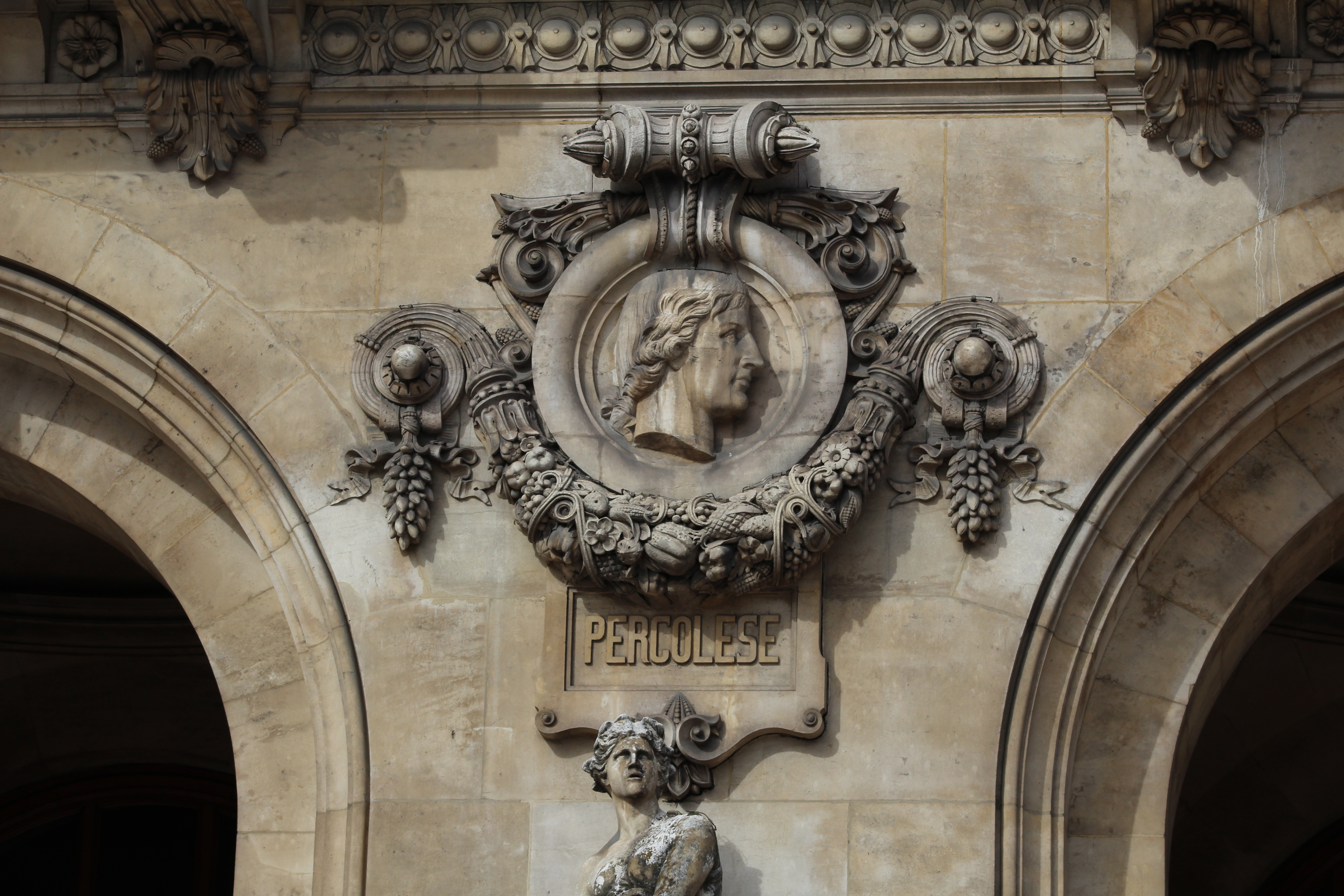
Neoclassical festoon on the facade of the Palais Garnier, Paris, designed by Charles Garnier, 1860–1875

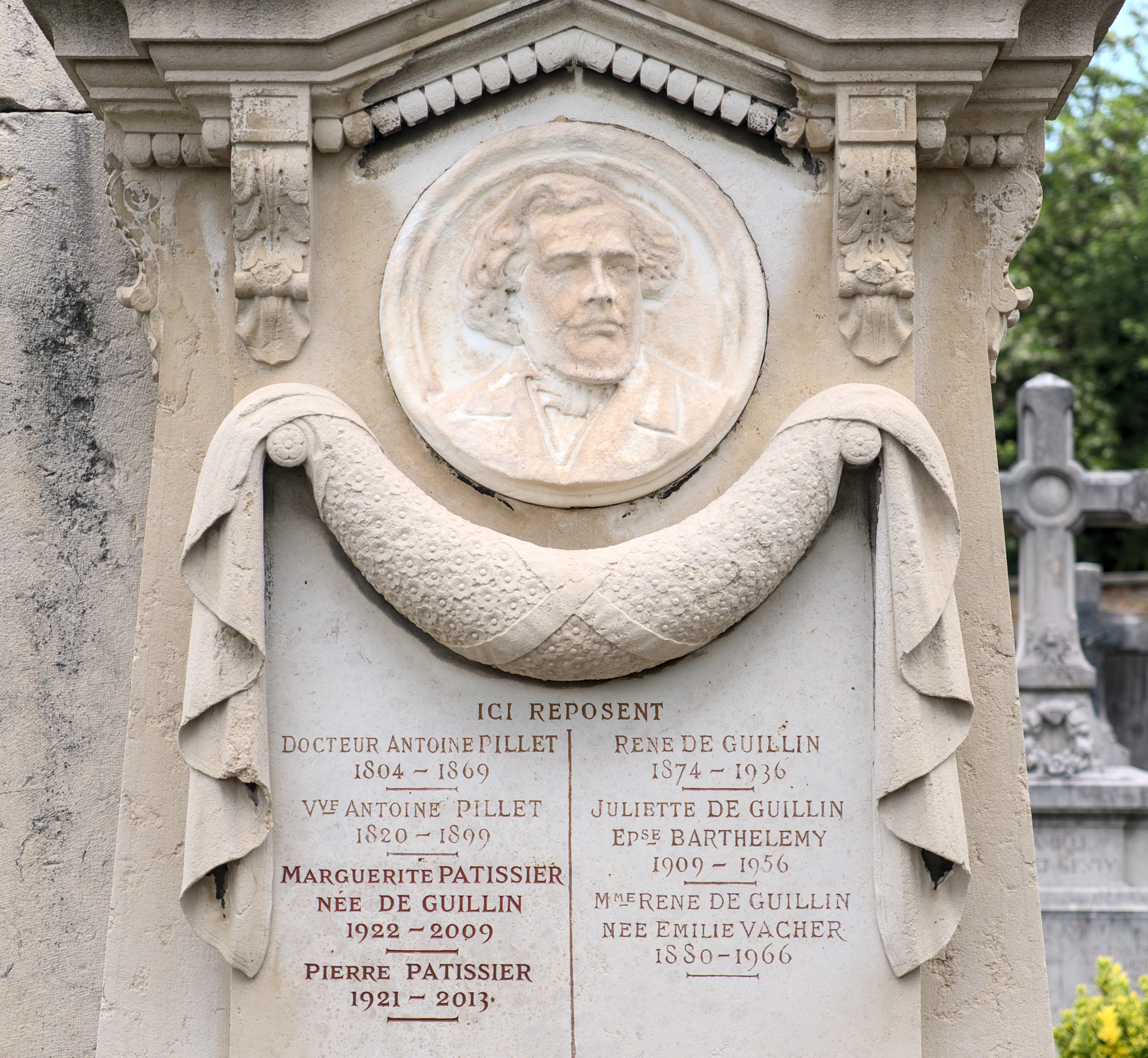
Neoclassical festoon on the Grave of the Pillet family, Loyasse Cemetery, Lyon, designed by Jean-Prosper Bissuel and sculpted by Pierre-Toussaint Bonnaire, probably 1869

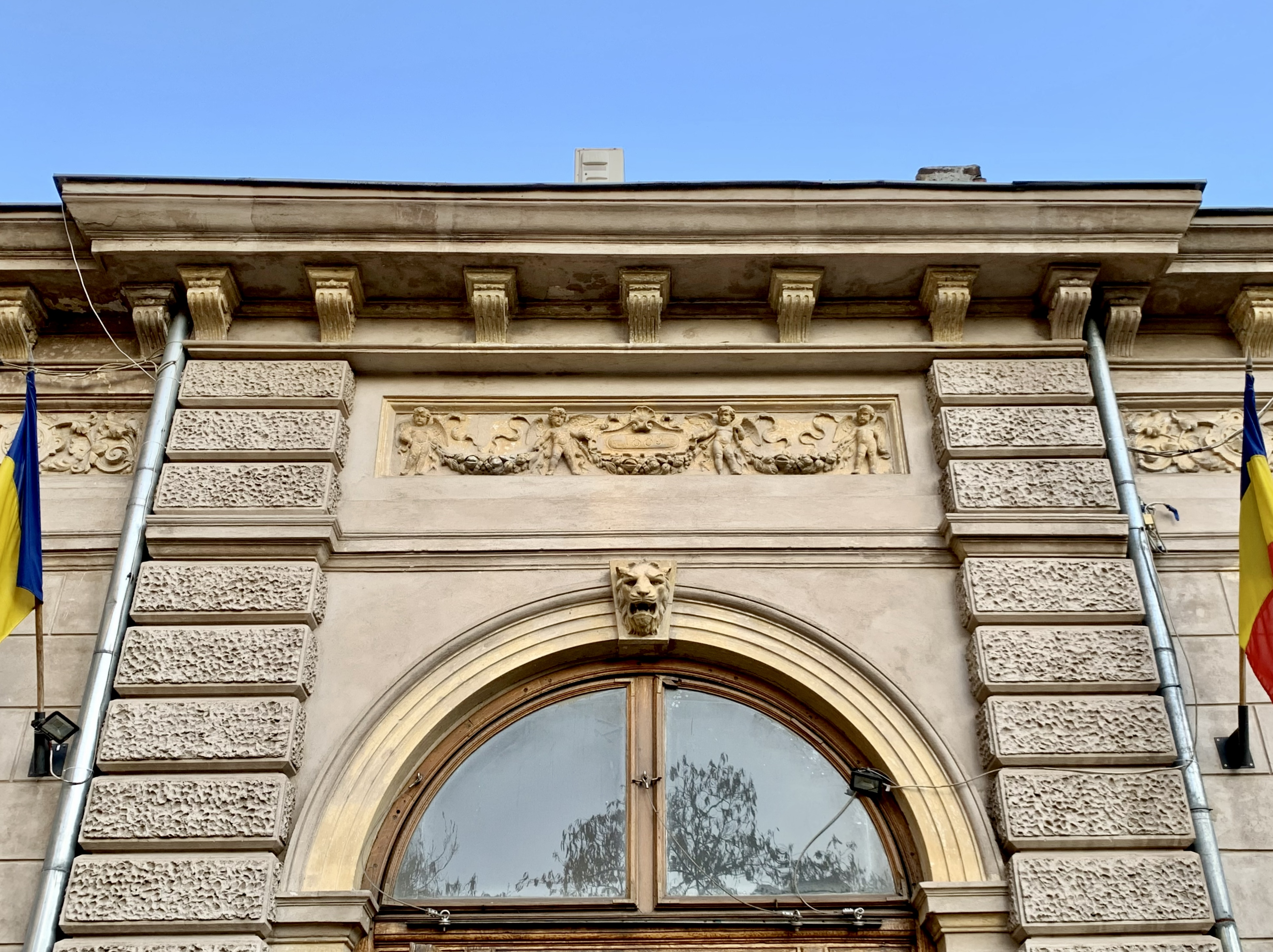
Neoclassical relief with putti and festoons on the Dimitrie Sturdza House (Strada Arthur Verona no. 13–15), Bucharest, Romania, unknown architect, 1883

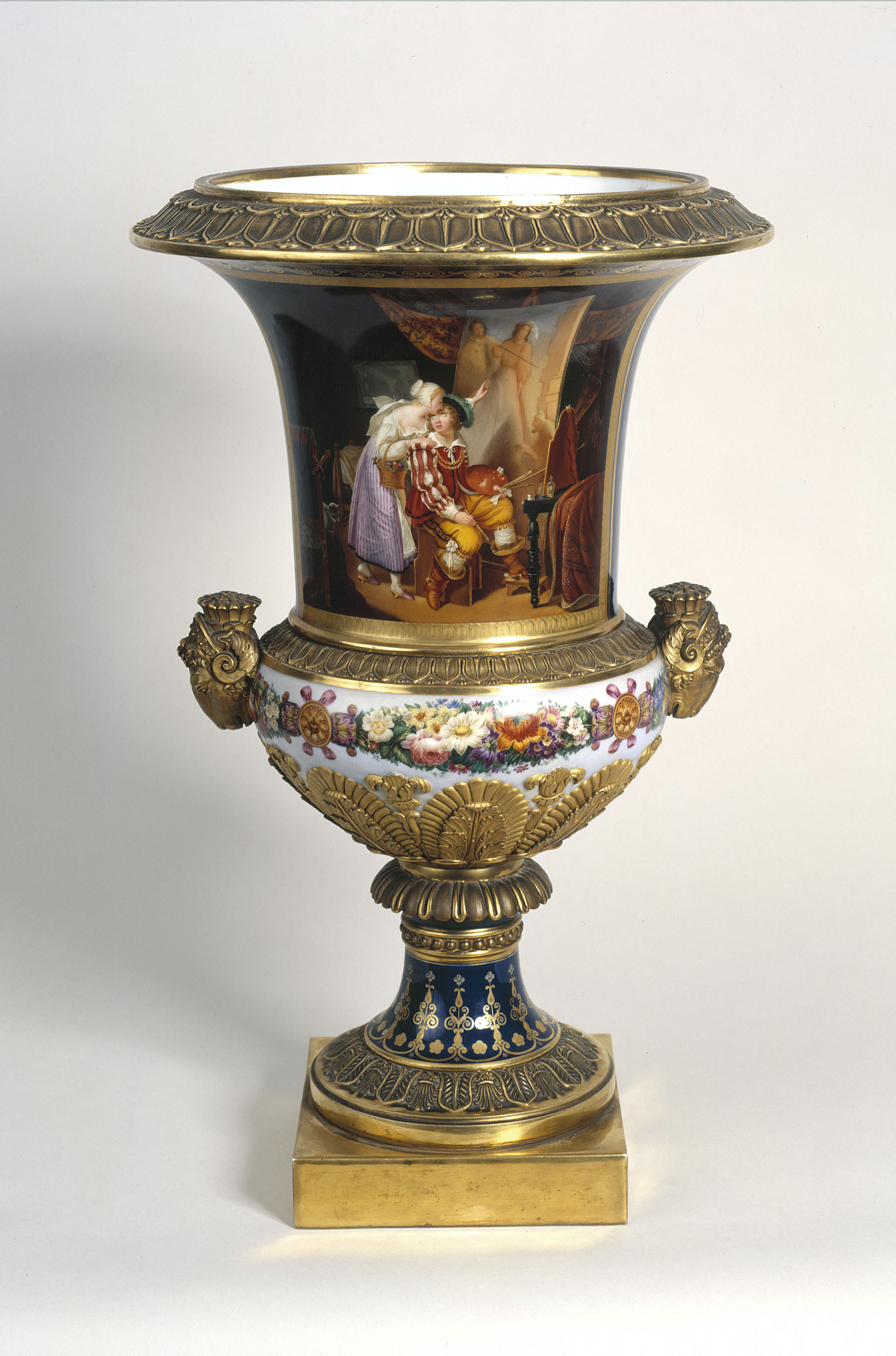
Festoon on a vase of Anthony van Dyck painting his first painting, by Dalou Aimé-Jules and the Sèvres Porcelain Factory, c.1888, sandstone, Petit Palais

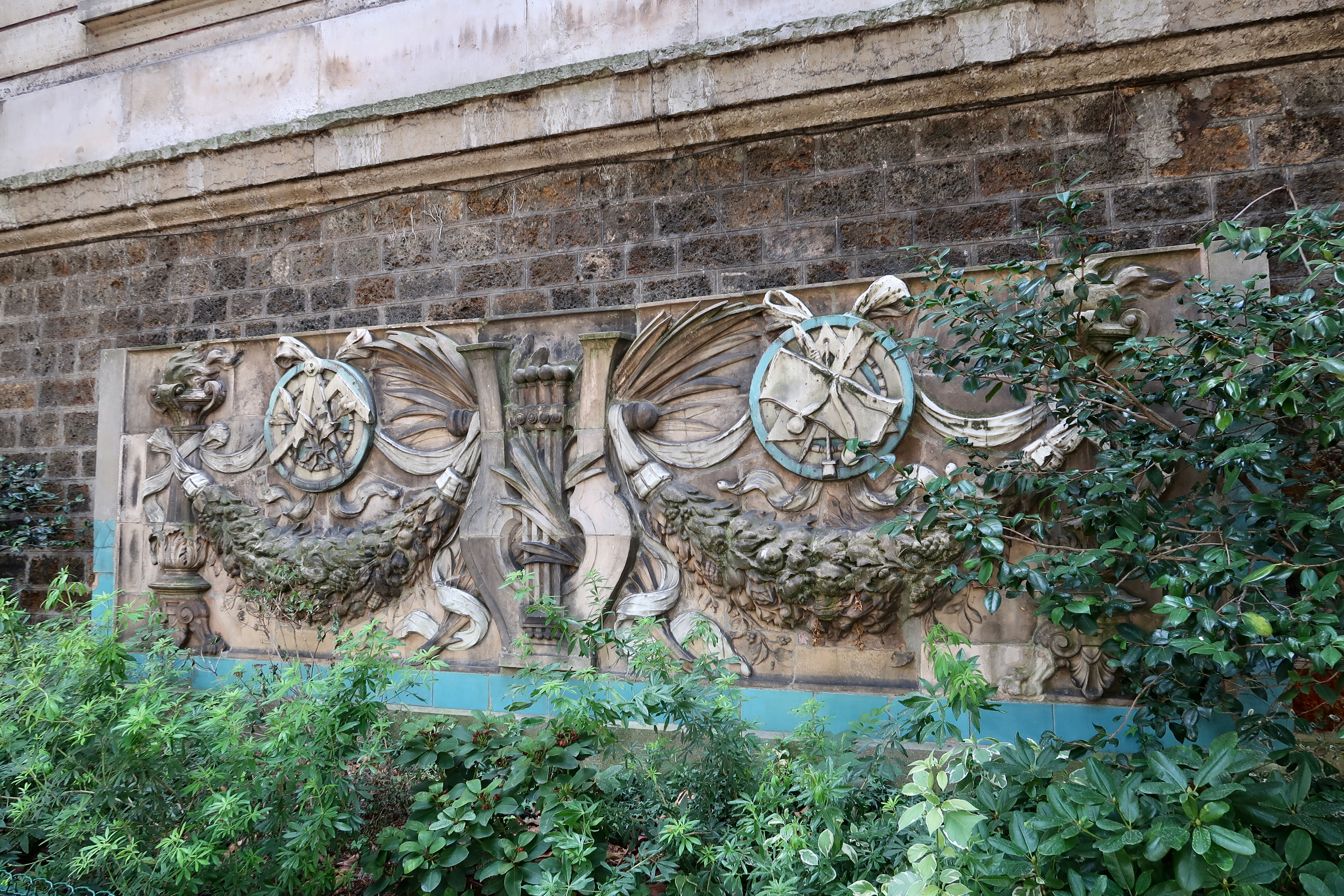
Beaux Arts festoons on an architectural element of the Palais des Beaux-Arts, part of the 1889 Paris Exposition, now in the Square Paul-Langevin, Paris, by Jules-Paul Loebnitz, 1889

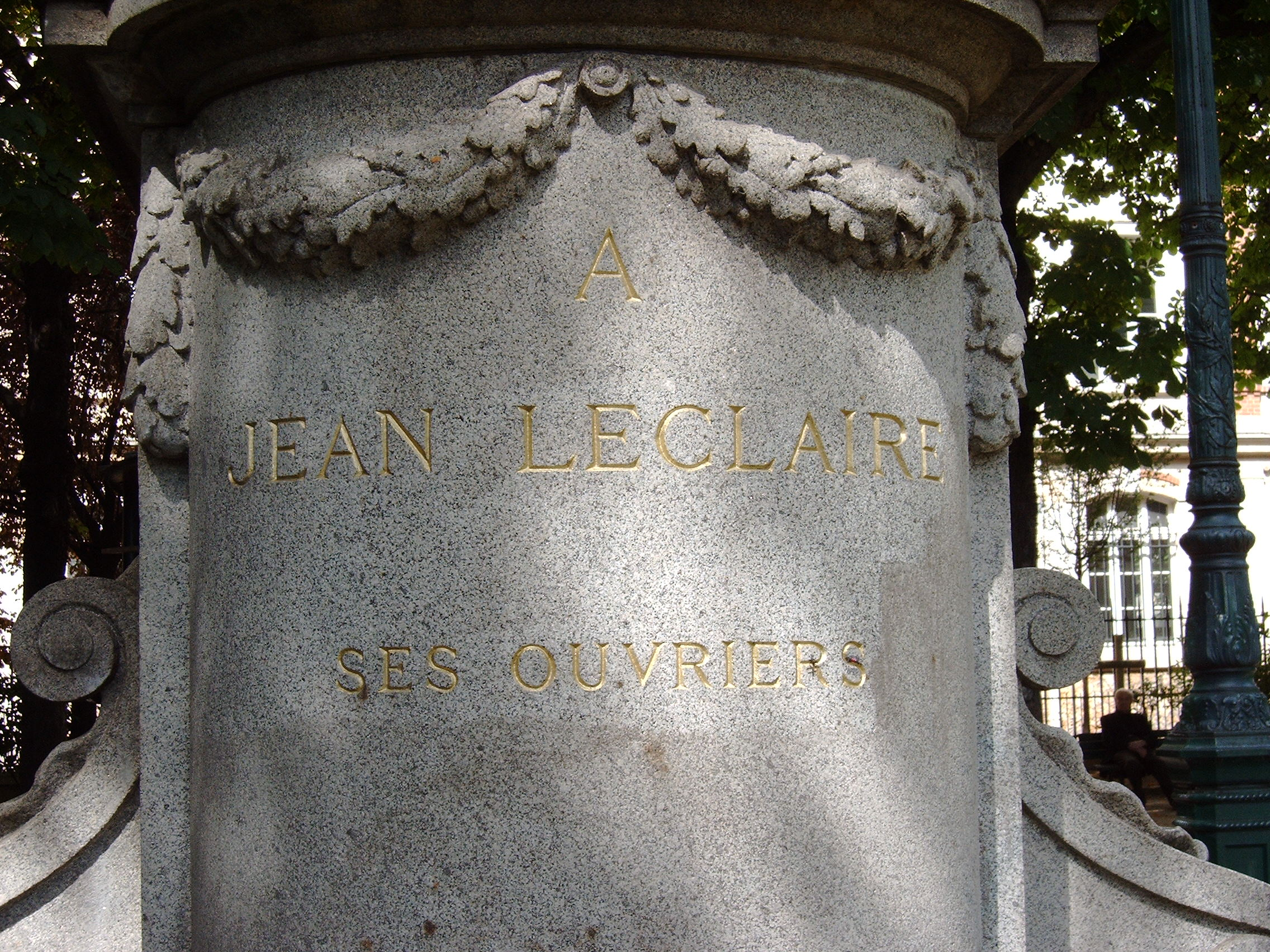
Beaux Arts oak leaf festoons on the Jean Leclaire Monument, Square des Épinettes, Paris, by Jean Camille Formigé, 1896

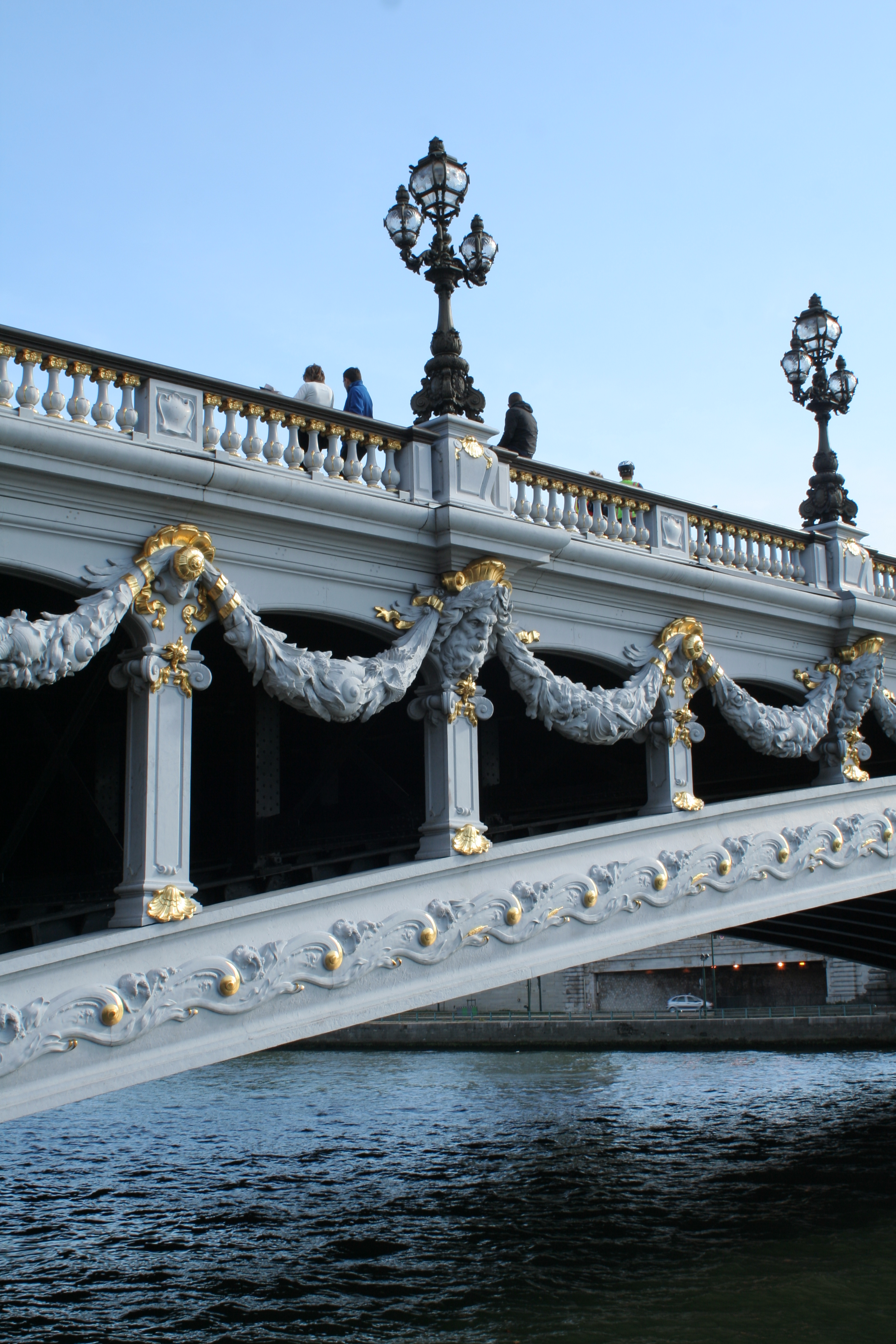
Beaux Arts festoons of the Pont Alexandre III, Paris, designed by Joseph Cassien-Bernard and Gaston Cousin, 1896–1900

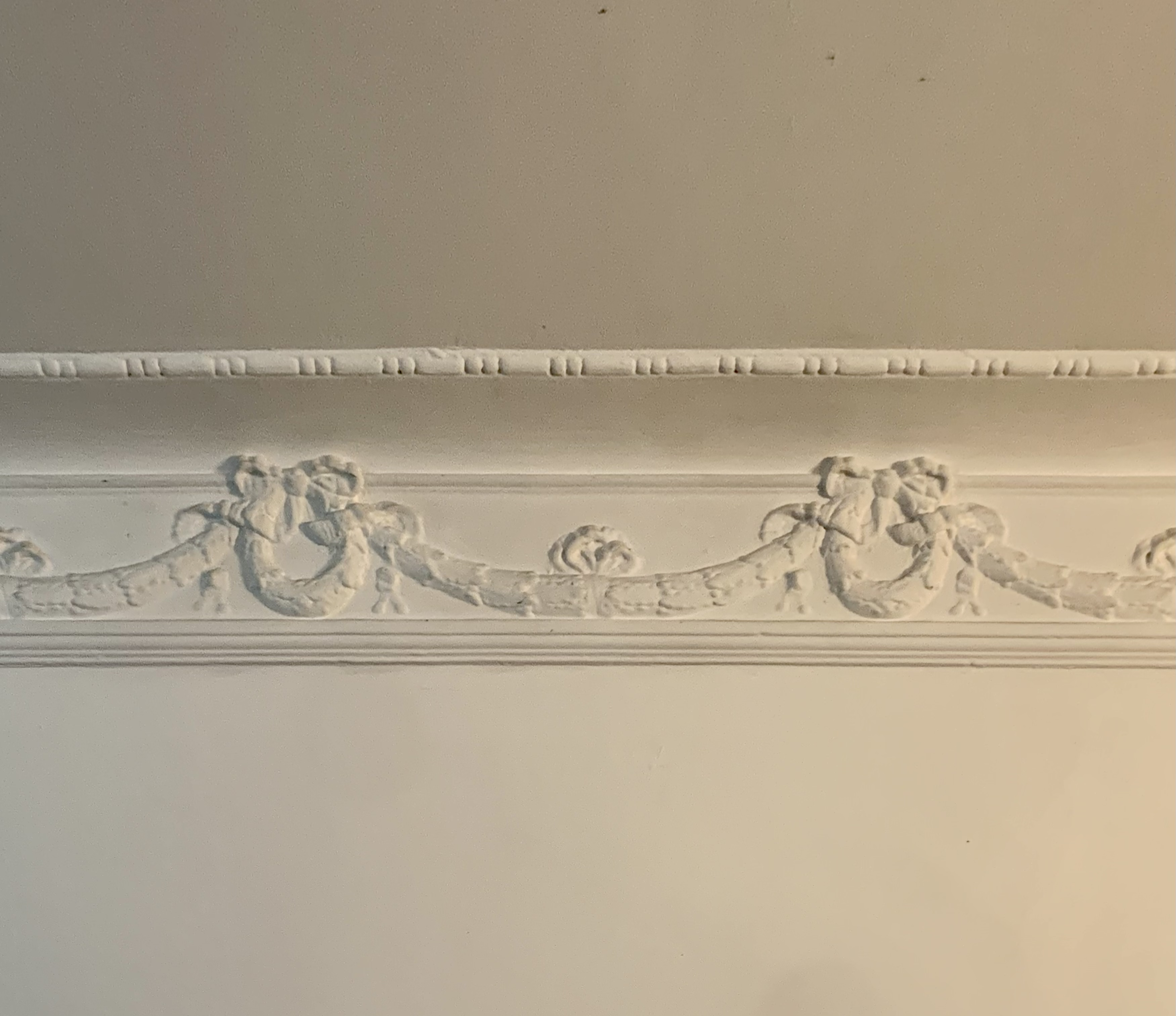
Stylized Art Nouveau festoon on a ceiling of Calea Dorobanților no. 50A, Bucharest, unknown architect, c.1900

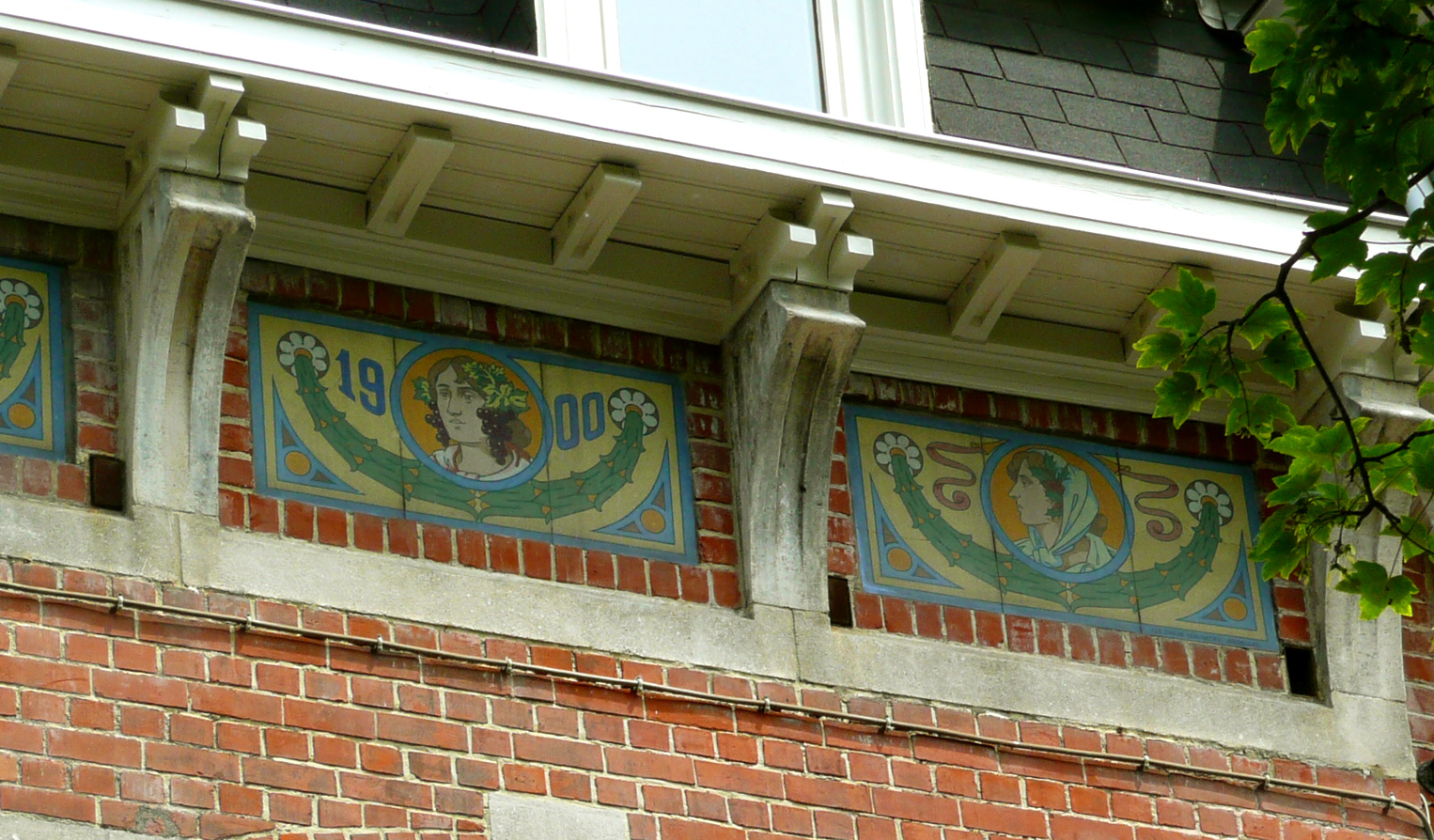
Stylized Art Nouveau festoons on Place de la Résistance no. 8, Brussels, Belgium, unknown architect or ceramist, 1900

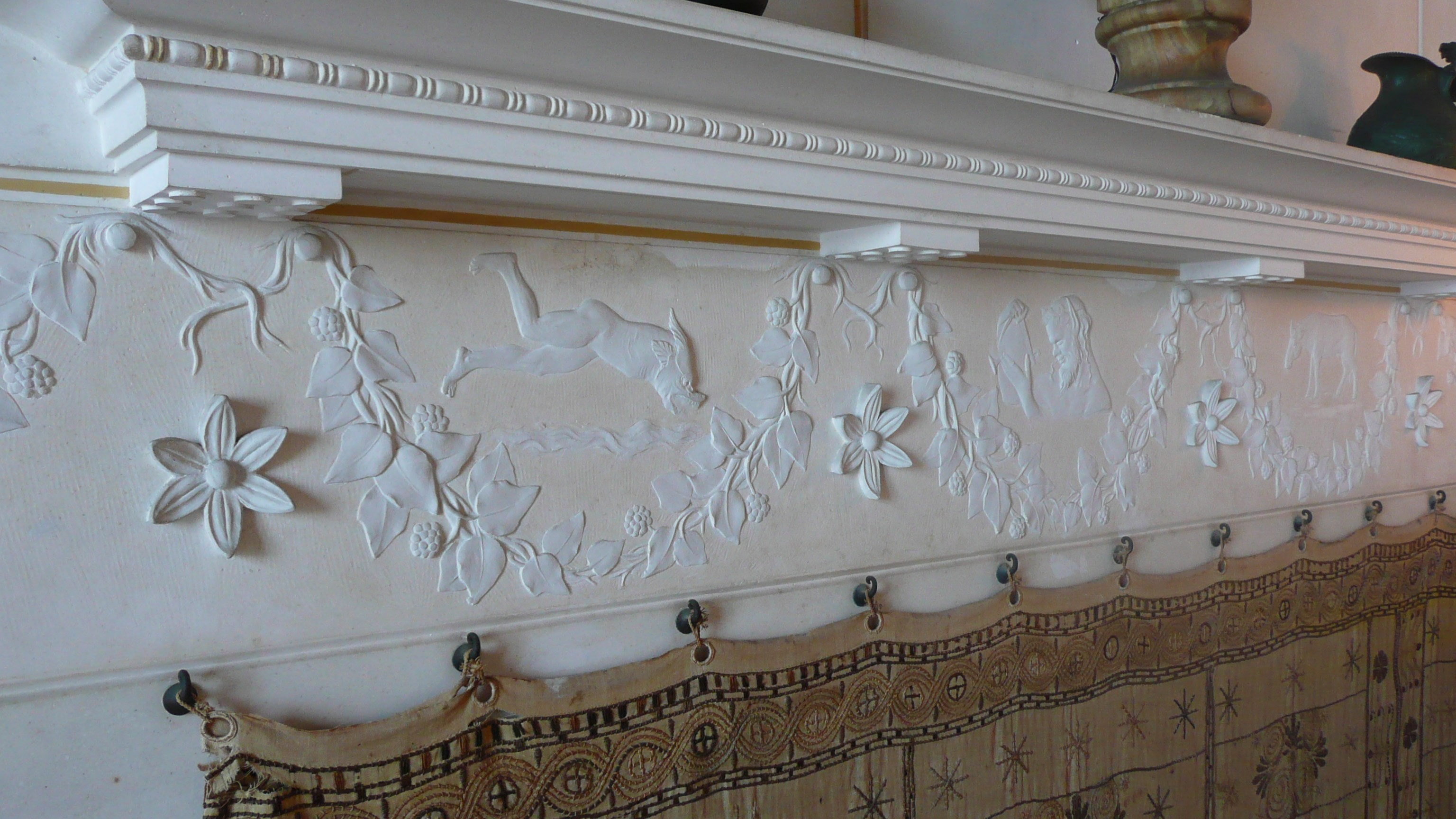
Greek Revival festoons in the Villa Kerylos, Beaulieu-sur-Mer, France, by Emmanuel Pontremoli, 1902–1908

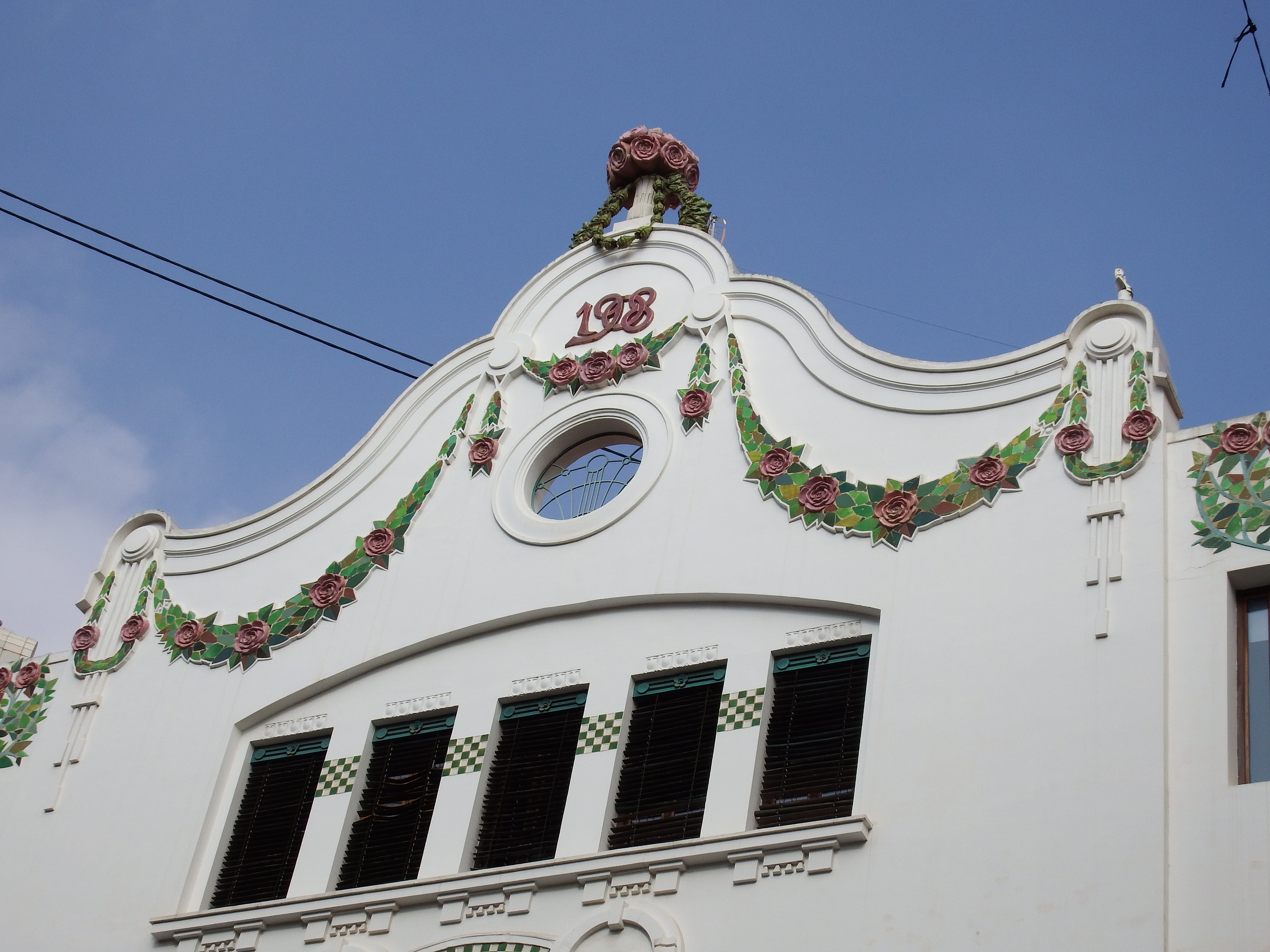
Art Nouveau festoons on the facade of the Ferrer Building, Valencia, Spain, by Vicente Ferrer Pérez, 1907-1908

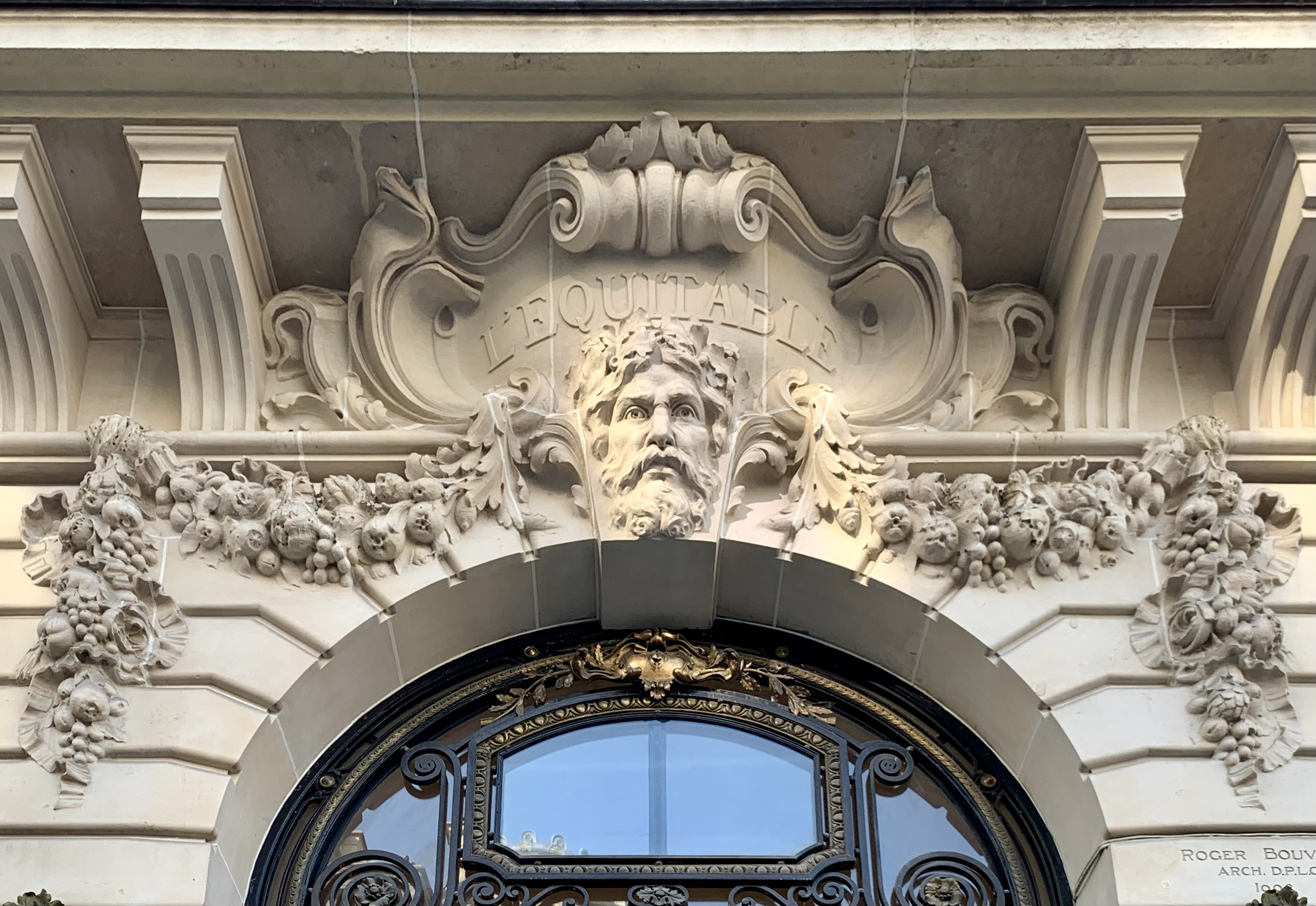
Beaux Arts mascaron with festoons on Rue de la Paix no. 23, Paris, unknown architect, 1908

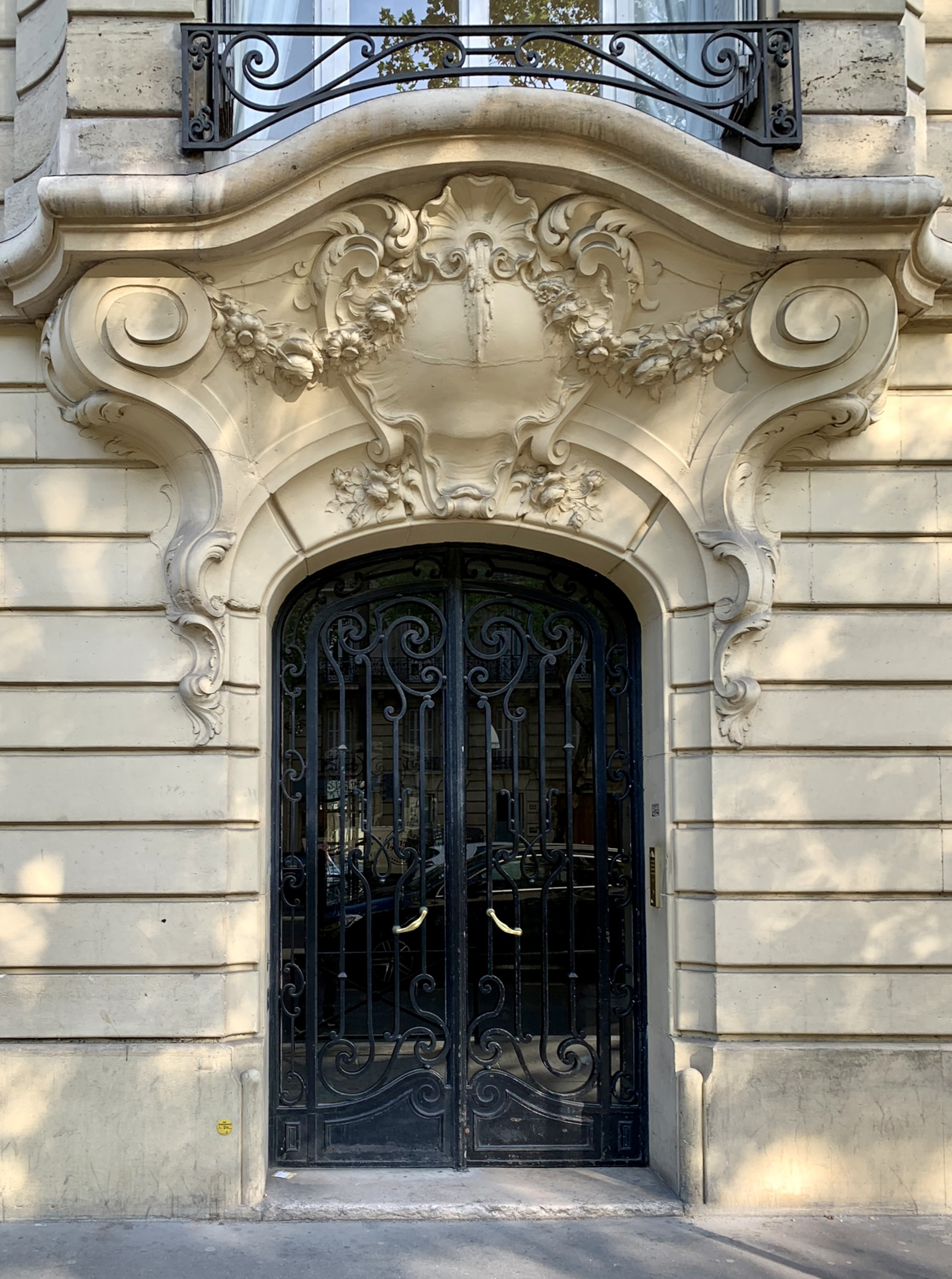
Beaux Arts festoons above the door of Avenue Kléber no. 47bis, Paris, unknown architect, 1908

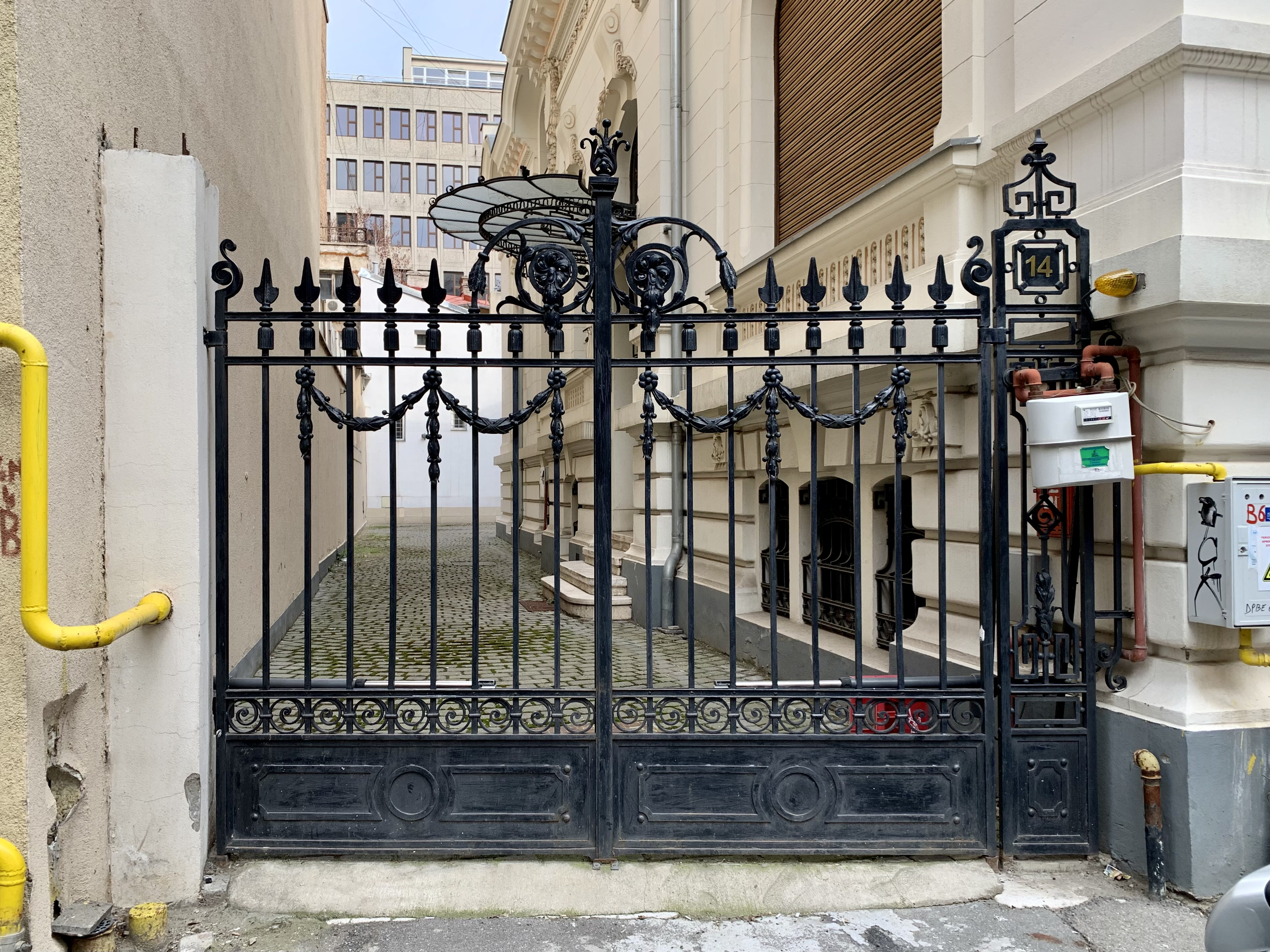
Beaux Arts gate with festoons of Strada Vasile Conta no. 14, Bucharest, unknown architect, c.1910

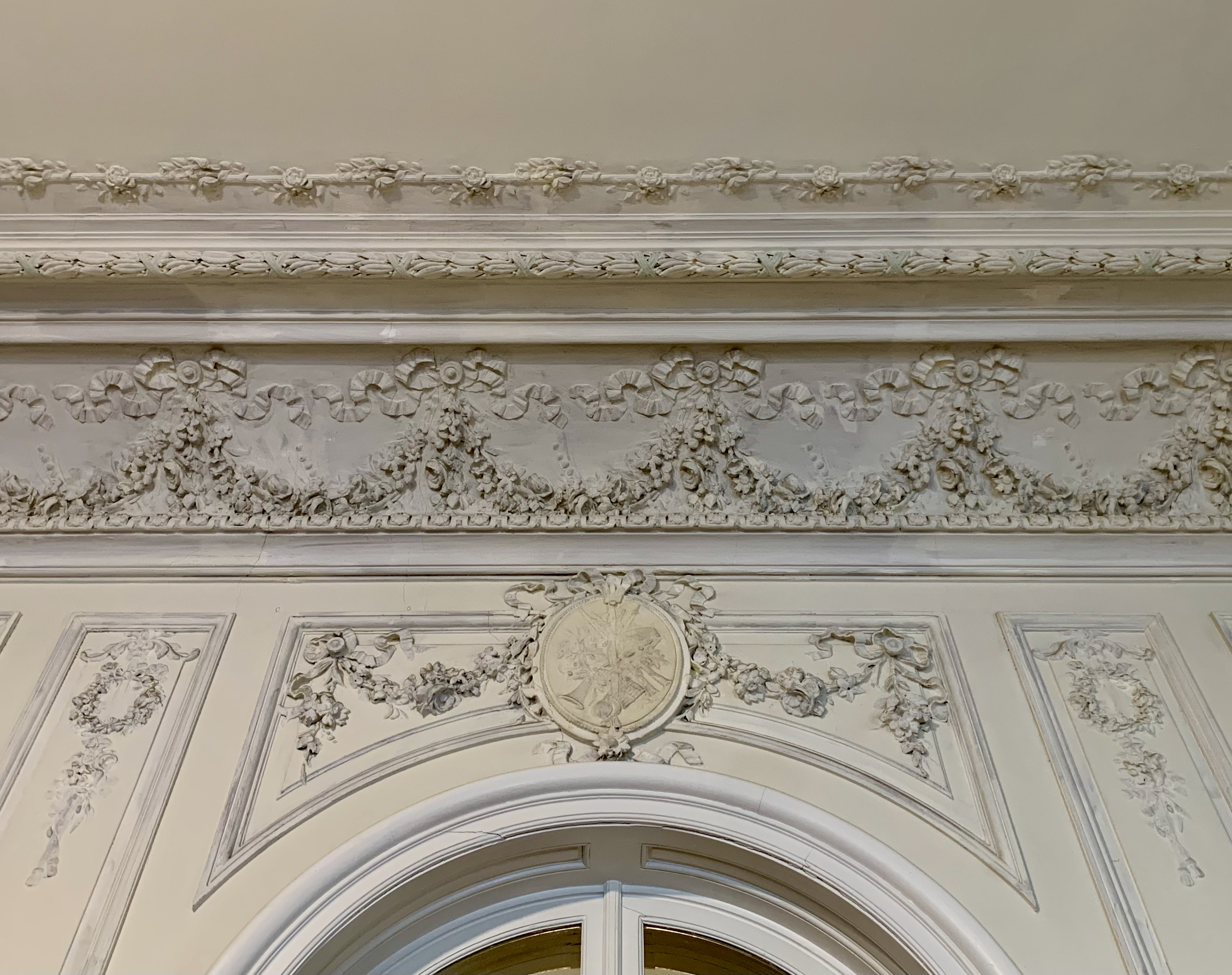
Neo-Louis XVI style festoons with a medallion above a door in Strada Arthur Verona no. 15, Bucharest, unknown architect, c. 1910

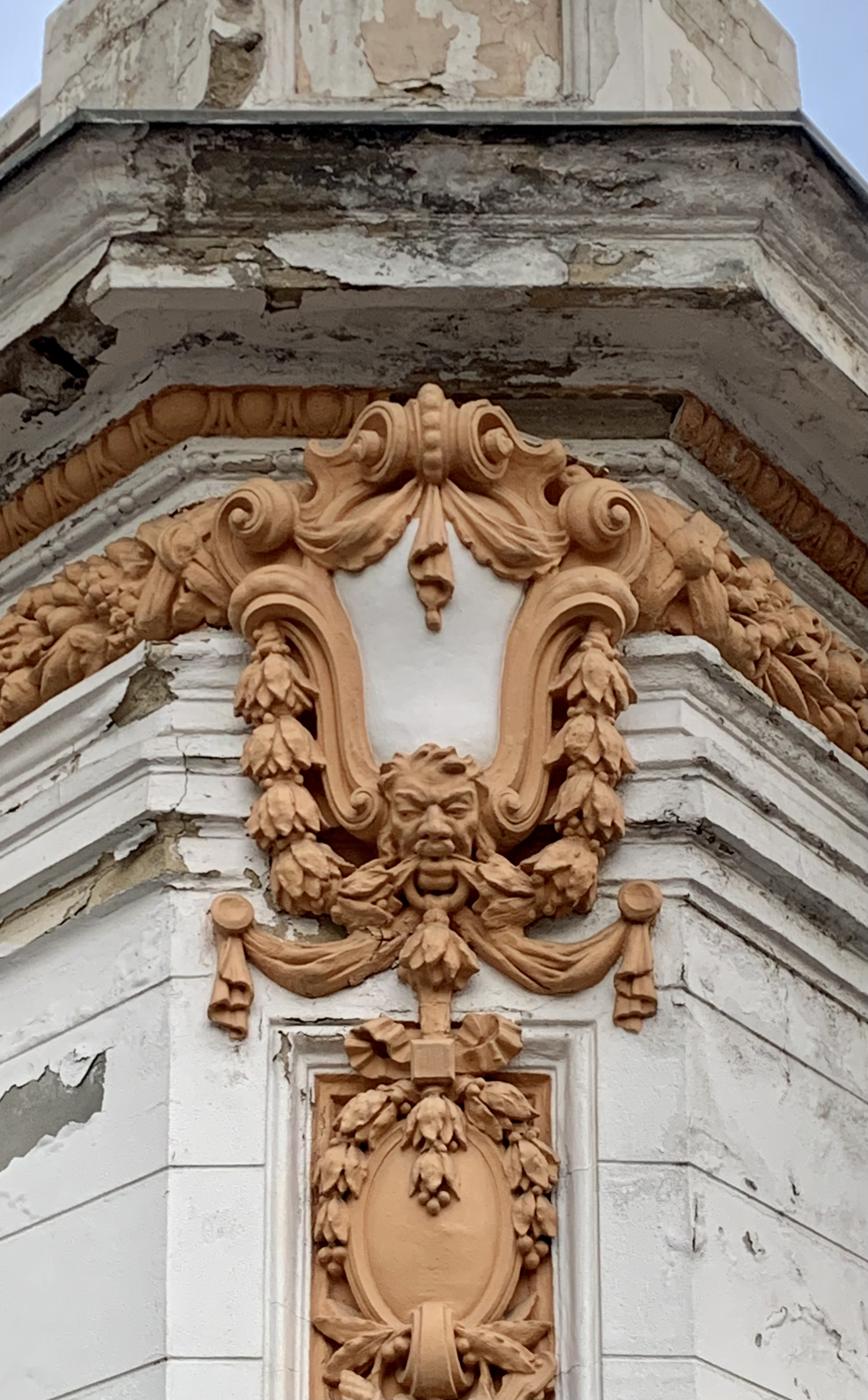
Beaux Arts swags of a cartouche on the Nicolae T. Filitti/Nae Filitis House (Calea Dorobanților no. 18), by Ernest Doneaud, c.1910

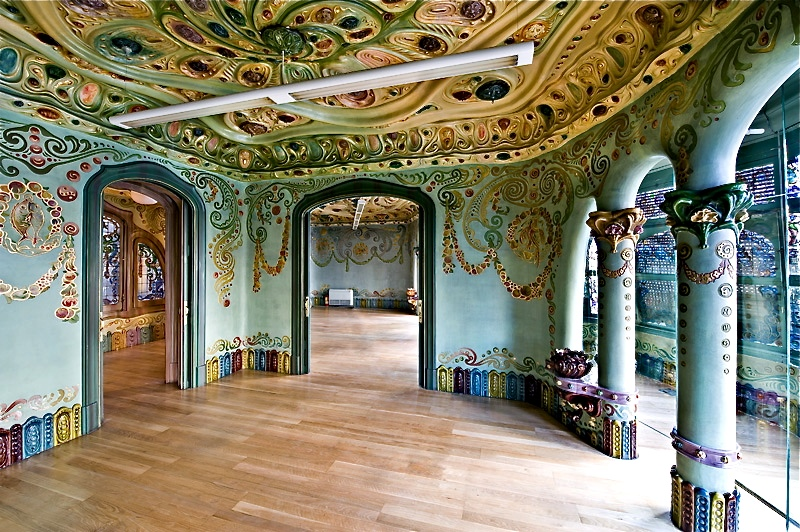
Art Nouveau festoons on the walls and columns of a room in the Casa Comalat, Barcelona, Spain, by Salvador Valeri i Pupurull, 1911

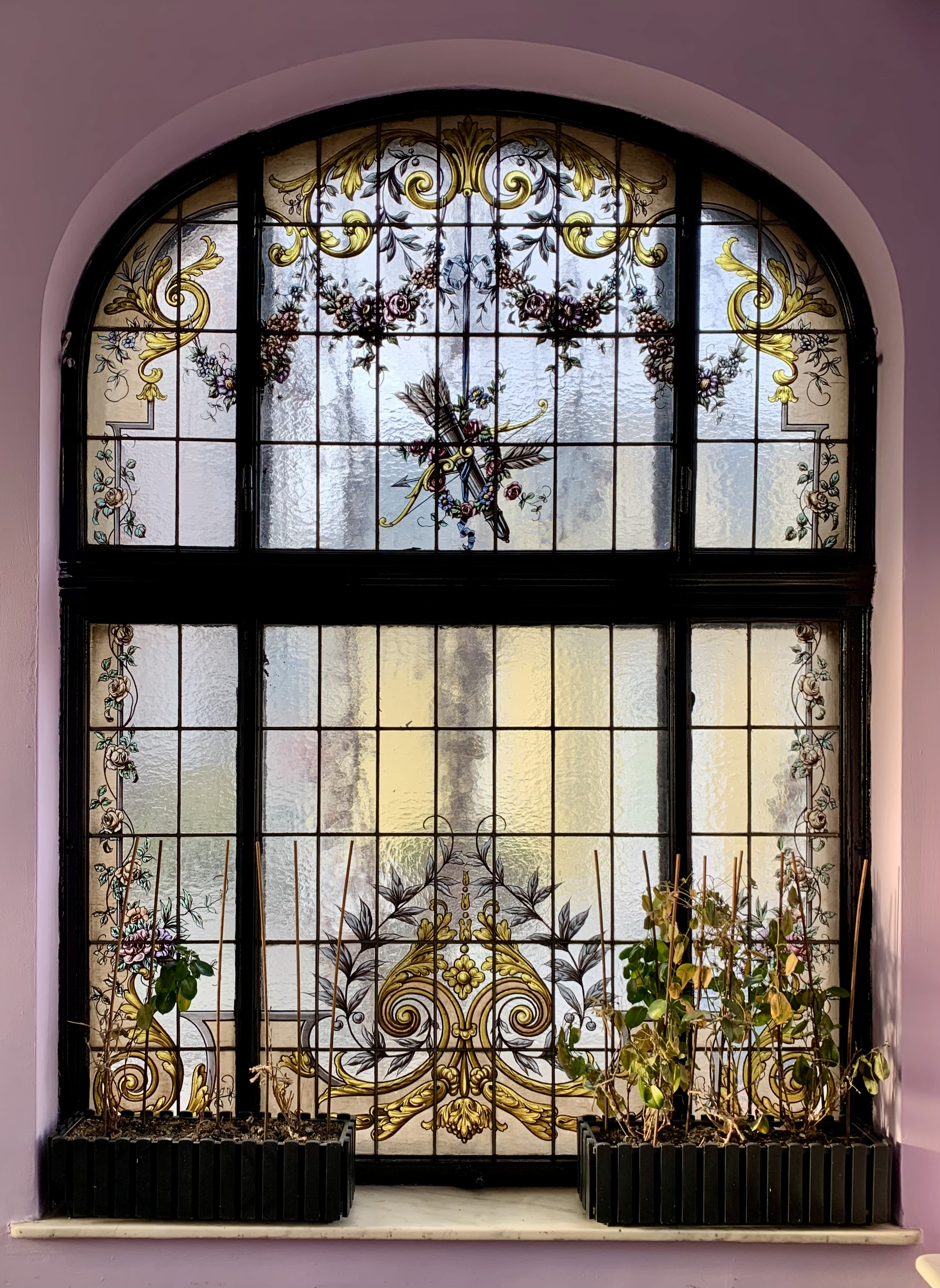
Rococo Revival festoon on a stained-glass window in the orangery of the Ecaterina Procopie House (Strada Bocșa no. 4), Bucharest, unknown architect or painter, c.1912

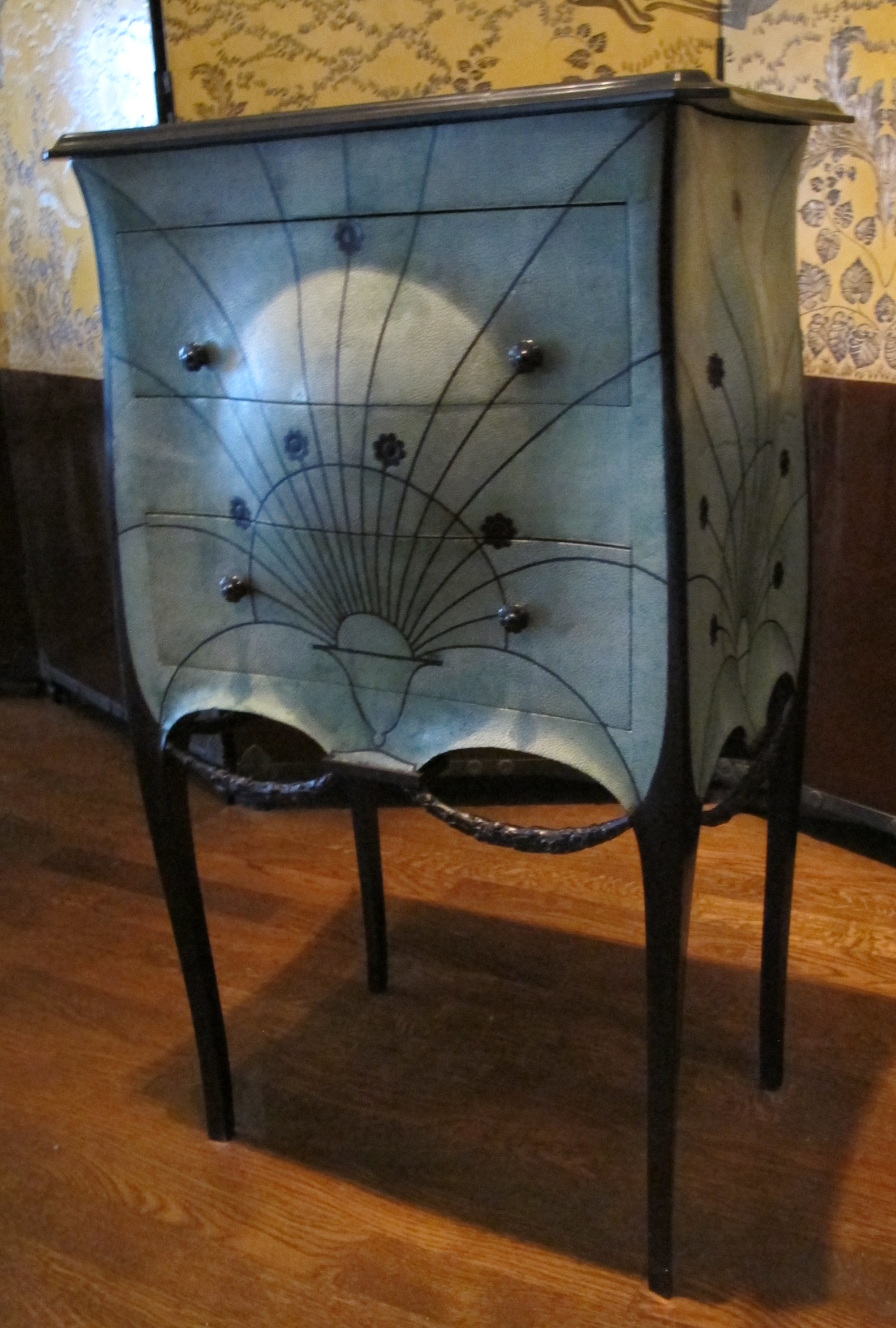
Stylized Art Deco festoons on a commode, by Paul Iribarne Garay, c.1912, mahogany and tulip wood frame, slate top, green-tinted shagreen upholstery, ebony knobs, base and garlands, Museum of Decorative Arts, Paris

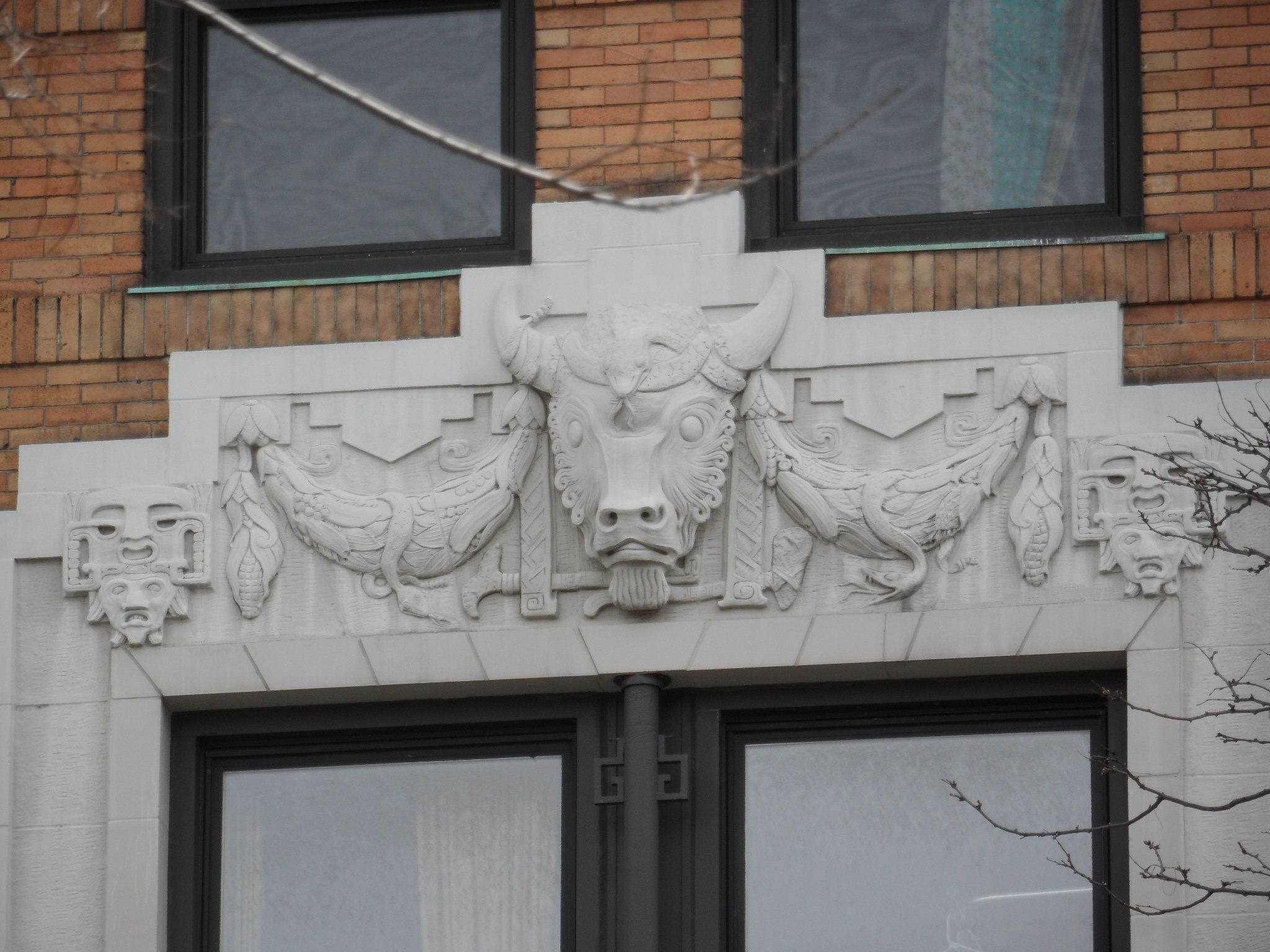
American reinterpretation of festoons inspired by Pre-Columbian art on The Cliff Dwelling (Riverside Drive no. 243), New York City, designed by Herman Lee Meader, 1914–1916

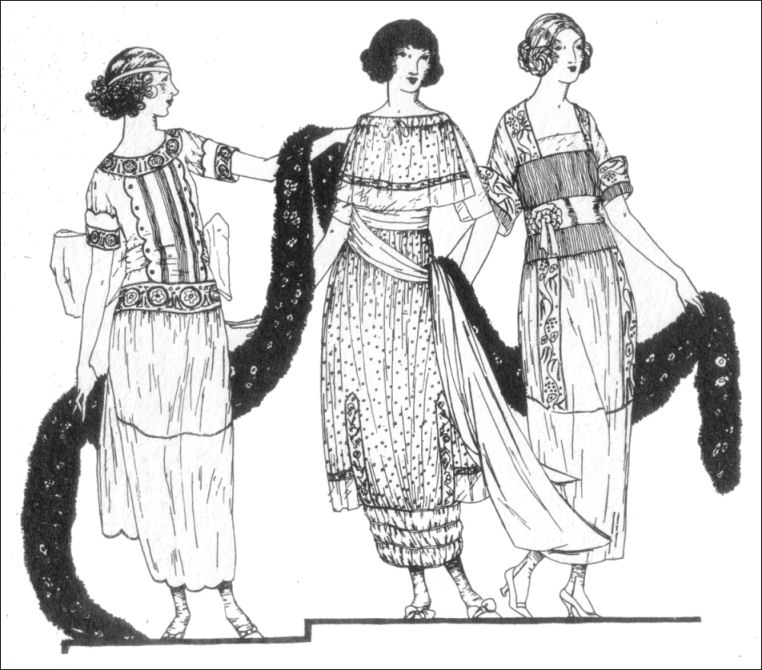
Art Deco festoon on a fashion plate from a summer Vogue magazine, 1919, ink on paper, multiple locations since multiple magazines were printed

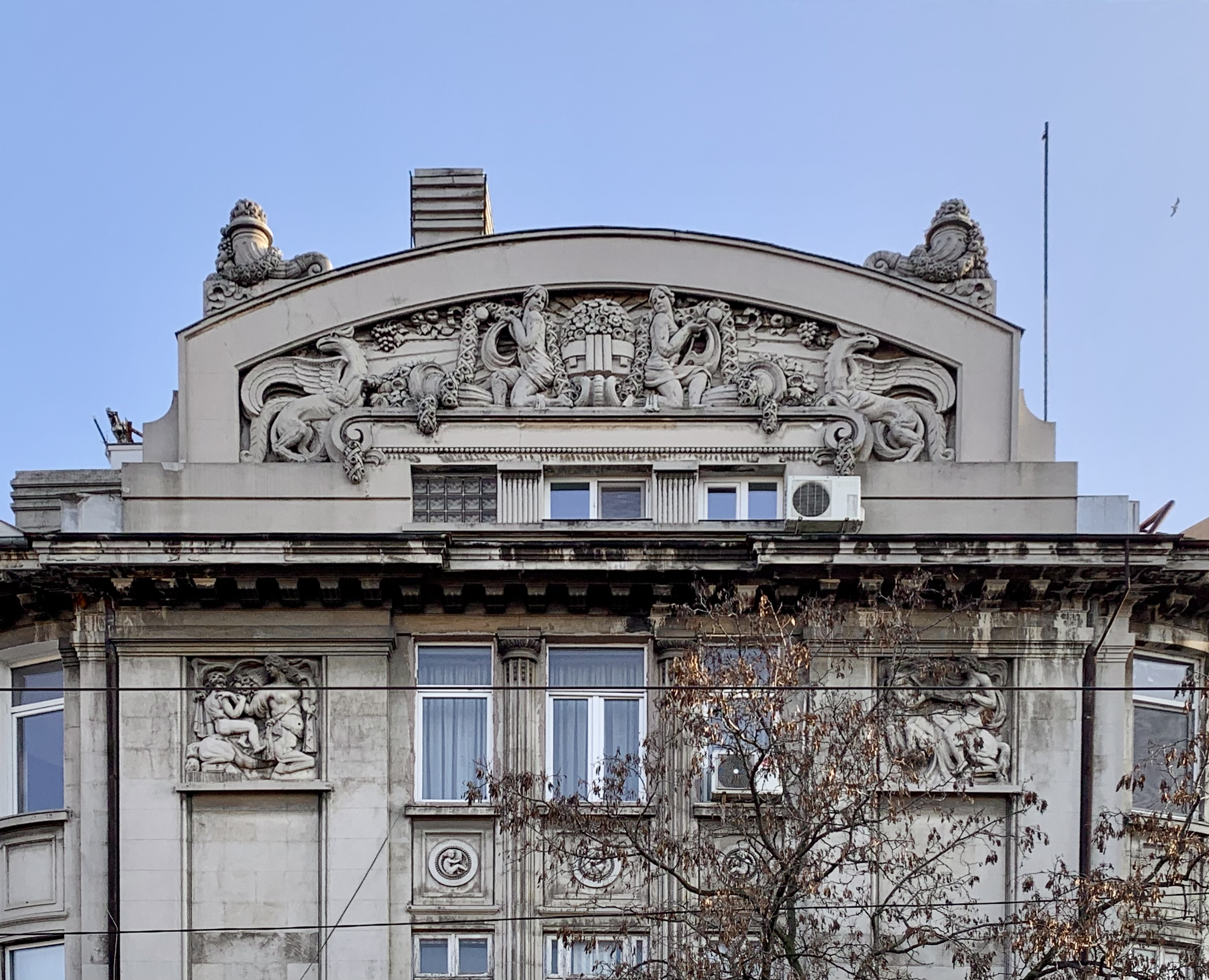
Stylized Art Deco festoons in the pediment of the Mihai Zisman House (Calea Călărașilor no. 44), Bucharest, by architect Soru, 1920

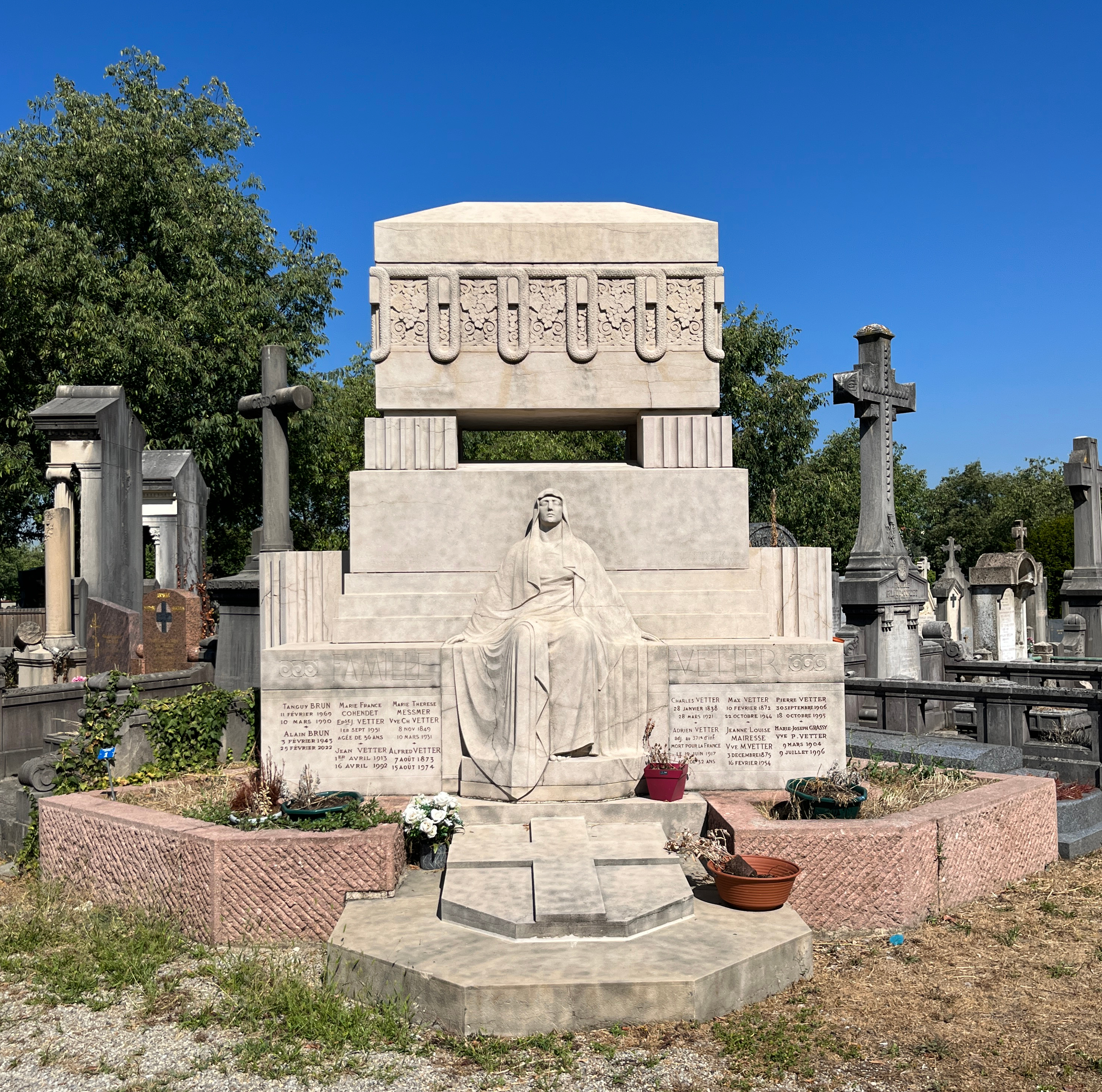
Highly stylized Art Deco festoons on the Grave of the Vetter Family, Cemetery of Croix-Rousse (new), Rhône, France, designed by Michel Roux-Spitz, and sculpted by Marcel Renard and Raymond Delamarre, c.1920

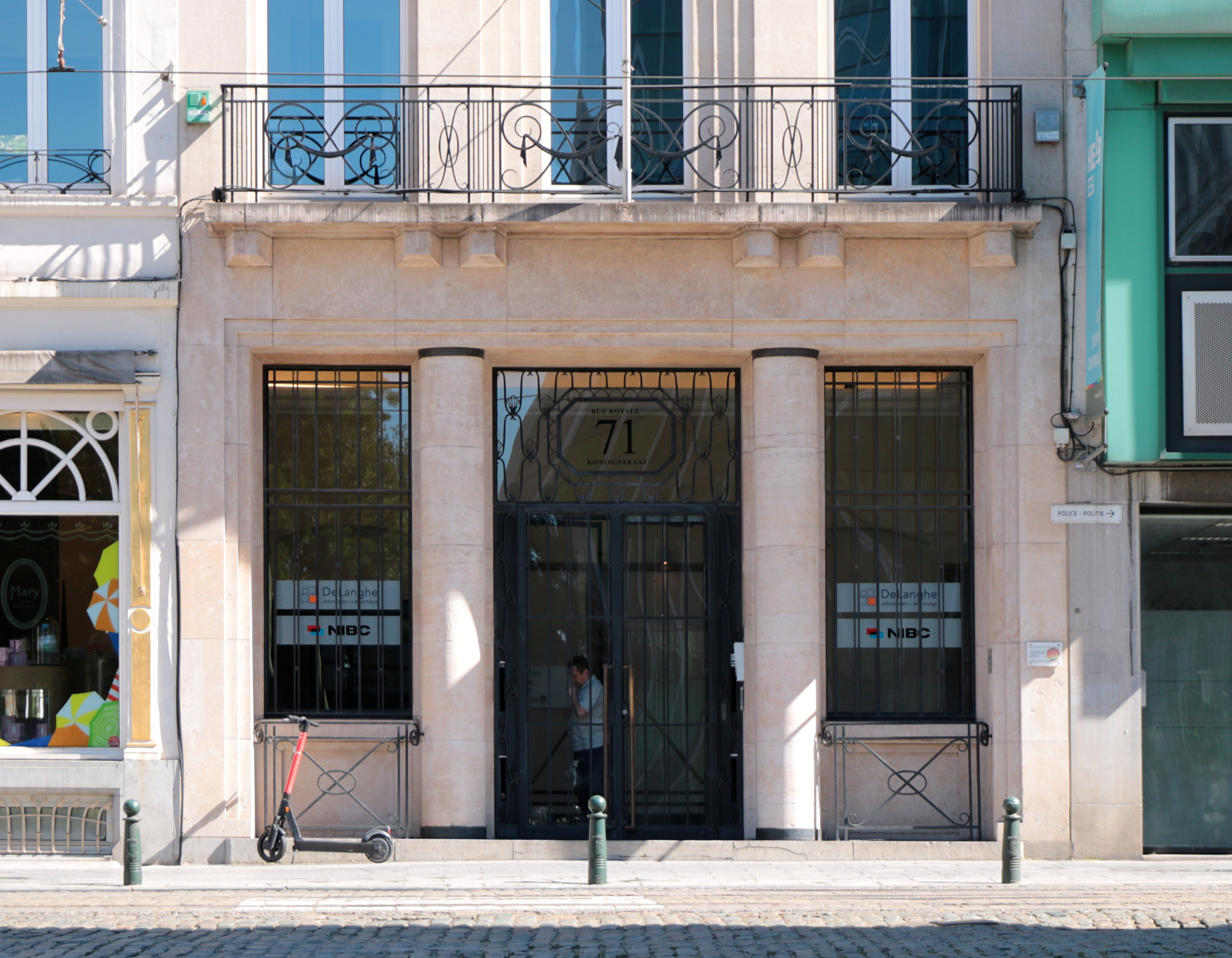
Art Deco wrought iron swags on the balcony of the Banque Buurmans (Rue Royale no. 71), Brussels, Belgium, by G.J. Maugue, 1927

== See also ==
- Classical architecture
- Garland bearers
- Ornament
- Tinsel

== General and cited references ==
- Hopkins, Owen (2014). Architectural Styles: A Visual Guide. Laurence King. ISBN 978-178067-163-5.
- Jones, Denna, ed. (2014). Architecture The Whole Story. Thames & Hudson. ISBN 978-0-500-29148-1.

Attribution:
