= HMS Atherstone (L05) =

Destroyer of the Royal Navy

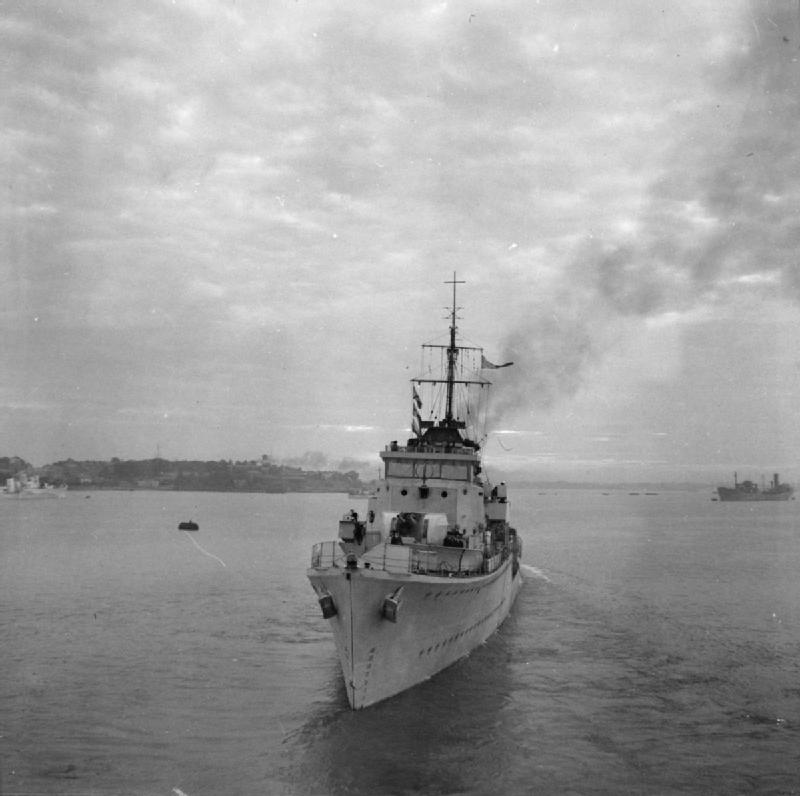
- HMS Atherstone in 1942

History

United Kingdom
- Name: HMS Atherstone
- Ordered: 21 March 1939
- Builder: Cammell Laird, Birkenhead
- Laid down: 8 June 1939
- Launched: 12 December 1939
- Commissioned: 23 March 1940
- Fate: Sold for scrap 1957

General characteristics
- Class & type: Type I Hunt-class destroyer
- Displacement: 1,000 long tons (1,016 t) standard; 1,340 long tons (1,362 t) full load
- Length: 264 ft 3 in (80.54 m) pp, 280 ft (85.34 m) oa
- Beam: 29 ft (8.84 m)
- Draught: 7 ft 9 in (2.36 m)
- Propulsion: 2 Admiralty 3-drum boilers; 2 shaft Parsons geared turbines, 19,000 shp (14,000 kW)
- Speed: 27.5 kn (50.9 km/h; 31.6 mph)
- Range: 2,500 nmi (4,600 km; 2,900 mi) at 20 kn (37 km/h; 23 mph)
- Complement: 146
- Armament: 4 × QF 4-inch (102 mm) Mark XVI guns on twin mounts Mk. XIX; 4 × QF 2-pounder (40 mm) Mk VIII AA guns (1 × quad mount); 30 depth charges

HMS Atherstone was a Hunt-class destroyer of the Royal Navy. She was launched in late 1939 as the first of her class but was found to be unstable, and had to undergo significant modifications before entering service in March 1940.

== Construction and design ==
Atherstone was ordered from Cammell Laird of Birkenhead on 21 March 1939, as one of the first batch of ten Hunt-class destroyers. The Hunts were intended to make up for a shortage in destroyer-type vessels, particularly for escort duties. They were to combine the heavy anti-aircraft armament of the Bittern-class sloops (i.e. six 4 inch (102 mm) QF Mk XVI dual purpose (anti-ship and anti-aircraft) guns in three twin mounts) with a speed of 29 knots (54 km/h; 33 mph) (compared with 18 3/4 knots (35 km/h; 22 mph) for the Bitterns) to allow them to work with the fleet when necessary. This was supplemented by a close-in anti-aircraft armament of a quadruple 2-pounder "pom-pom", and an anti-submarine armament of 30 depth charges. No torpedo-tubes were to be carried.

Atherstone was laid down on 8 June 1939 and launched on 12 December 1939. An inclining test when the ship was fitting out showed that she, and by extension all the Hunts, was dangerously unstable owing to a design error. (Note: Overwork of the designers resulted in an error in calculating the ship's centre of gravity not to be spotted. This was accentuated by the ships being heavier than estimated, with an overall effect of reducing the ships' metacentric height by about 1 foot (0.30 m).) To restore stability to acceptable levels, one twin 4 inch mount was removed, the ship's superstructure and funnel was cut down and additional ballast was fitted. Thus modified, Atherstone was completed and commissioned (with the pennant number L05) on 23 March 1940.

Atherstone was 264 feet 3 inches (80.54 m) long between perpendiculars and 280 feet (85.34 m) overall. The ship's beam was 29 feet 0 inches (8.84 m) and draught 7 feet 9 inches (2.36 m). As modified, displacement was 1,000 long tons (1,000 t) standard and 1,360 long tons (1,380 t) under full load. Two Admiralty boilers raising steam at 300 pounds per square inch (2,100 kPa) and 620 °F (327 °C) fed Parsons single-reduction geared steam turbines that drove two propeller shafts, generating 19,000 shaft horsepower (14,000 kW) at 380 rpm. This gave a speed of 27.5 knots (50.9 km/h; 31.6 mph).

The ship's main gun armament was four 4 inch (102 mm) QF Mk XVI dual purpose (anti-ship and anti-aircraft) guns in two twin mounts, with one mount forward and one aft. Additional close-in anti-aircraft armament was provided by a quadruple 2-pounder "pom-pom" mount. The ship was later modified by adding two single Oerlikon 20 mm cannon on the bridge wings, while a single "pom-pom" was mounted in the ship's bow. Up to 40 depth charges could be carried. The ship had a complement of 146 officers and men.

== Service ==
Following commissioning and initial trials, Atherstone joined the First Destroyer Flotilla based at Portsmouth employed on convoy escort duties in the English Channel. In June and July, she was detached to the Home Fleet, returning to Portsmouth in August. On 11 September 1940, while escorting Convoy CW11 in the Channel, Atherstone was hit by two bombs and near missed by a third, sustaining serious damage and killing 5 men. After repair at Chatham Dockyard, the ship rejoined the First Destroyer Flotilla in January 1941, resuming convoy escort duty in the Channel. In December 1941, after a refit at Southampton, Atherstone transferred to the 15th Destroyer Flotilla based at Devonport.

On 26 March 1942 Atherstone sailed from Falmouth as part of Operation Chariot, the St Nazaire Raid. This was an amphibious assault on the port of St Nazaire in France with the objective of destroying the gates of the Normandie dock by ramming them with an explosive-packed destroyer, Campbeltown, and so prevent the dock's use by the German battleship Tirpitz. Atherstone and her sister ship Tynedale escorted Campbeltown and the remainder of the strike force, towing the Motor Gun Boat MGB 314 on the passage to St Nazaire. Early on 27 March, Tynedale sighted the German submarine U-593, and the two escort destroyers attacked the U-boat. Although U-593 survived the attack, the destroyers forced the U-Boat to stay submerged for several hours, preventing it from interfering with the operation.

In May 1942 Atherstone transferred to the 16th Destroyer Flotilla, escorting convoys off the East coast of Britain. In March 1943 the ship transferred to the Mediterranean, joining the 18th Destroyer Flotilla. In July 1943, Atherstone took part in the Allied invasion of Sicily, forming part of the naval force supporting the landing of the British XXX Corps south-west of Syracuse. In September 1943, Atherstone took part in Operation Avalanche, the Anglo-American landings at Salerno in Italy, forming part of the escort for the force of aircraft carriers providing air cover for the landings.

On 26 November 1943 she rescued about 70 survivors from the troopship HMT Rohna, which had been sunk by a Henschel Hs 293 glide bomb off the coast of French Algeria. In August 1944, the Allies invaded the South of France, with Atherstone escorting convoys to the beaches.

In November 1944, Atherstone joined the 5th Destroyer Flotilla based at Alexandria, which was deployed in the Adriatic Sea. On 9 December Atherstone and the destroyer Aldenham shelled German troops on the island of Rab. On 14 December 1944, the two destroyers carried out another bombardment operation against targets on Pag. On returning from this operation, Aldenham struck a mine and sank 45 nmi (52 mi; 83 km) SE of Pola. Atherstone picked up 63 survivors, but 126 were killed.

On 23 September 1945 Atherstone sailed from the Mediterranean for Britain and was paid off into the reserve at Portsmouth. In 1953 she was transferred to Cardiff, remaining in extended reserve. On 23 November 1957, Atherstone was transferred to the British Iron & Steel Corporation for disposal, and was towed to Port Glasgow for scrapping by Smith & Houston.

== Bibliography ==
- Blair, Clay (2000). Hitler's U-Boat War: The Hunters 1939–1942. London: Cassell & Co. ISBN 0-304-35260-8.
- Critchley, Mike (1982). British Warships Since 1945: Part 3: Destroyers. Liskeard, UK: Maritime Books. ISBN 0-9506323-9-2.
- English, John (1987). The Hunts: A History of the Design, Development and Careers of the 86 Destroyers of This Class Built for the Royal and Allied Navies During World War II. Cumbria, UK: World Ship Society. ISBN 0-905617-44-4.
- Freivogel, Zvonimir (June 2008). "Olupine ratnih brodova iz dva svjetska rata u paškom podmorju" [Two world wars' warship wrecks in the sea off Pag]. Polemos: Journal of Interdisciplinary Research on War and Peace (in Croatian). 11 (21). Croatian Sociological Association and Jesenski & Turk Publishing House: 49–70. ISSN 1331-5595.
- Friedman, Norman (2008). British Destroyers and Frigates: The Second World War and After. Barnsley, UK: Seaforth Publishing. ISBN 978-1-84832-015-4.
- Gardiner, Robert; Chesneau, Roger, eds. (1980). Conway's All The World's Fighting Ships 1922–1946. London: Conway Maritime Press. ISBN 0-85177-146-7.
- Lenton, H.T. (1970). Navies of the Second World War: British Fleet & Escort Destroyers: Volume Two. London: Macdonald & Co. ISBN 0-356-03122-5.
- Rohwer, Jürgen; Hümmelchen, Gerhard (1992). Chronology of the War at Sea 1939–1945. London: Greenhill Books. ISBN 1-85367-117-7.
- Winser, John de S. (2002). British Invasion Fleets: The Mediterranean and beyond 1942–1945. Gravesend, UK: World Ship Society. ISBN 0-9543310-0-1.
- Whitley, M.J. (2000). Destroyers of World War Two: An International Encyclopedia. London: Cassell & Co. ISBN 1-85409-521-8.
