= Donald William Roy =

British Commando officer in WWII

Donald Roy DSO (21 January 1908 – 31 December 1997) was a British Commando officer during the Second World War. As a captain in No.2 Commando, Roy led an assault troop in the St. Nazaire Raid in March 1942.

== Early life ==
Donald William Roy was born into an upper middle class family in Ainsdale, Lancashire, on 21 January 1908 to Katherine Roy (nee McLaren) and William Roy. He was the eldest of three children, brother to Allan, a scratch golfer who won six caps at Rugby for Scotland and Elizabeth (Betty). His uncle, Sir John Travis-Clegg, was the Lord Lieutenant of Lancashire.

== Second World War service ==
At 1:30am on 28 March 1942 Roy was on the deck of HMS Campbeltown, an old First World War Wickes-class destroyer, formerly USS Buchanan, with her Oerlikon 20 mm cannon blazing at the German guns only a few yards away. The ship was loaded with 4.5 tons of explosives on its way to ram the dock gate in St. Nazaire port during the St Nazaire Raid, as part of Operation Chariot. The raid was described by Winston Churchill as "a deed of glory intimately involved in high strategy".

The kilt-wearing Roy, nicknamed "The Laird", and his 14-man assault troop were tasked with disabling two pump-house roof-top gun emplacements high above the quayside and securing a bridge to provide a route for the raiding parties to exit the dock area. Roy and Sergeant Don Randall used scaling ladders and grenades to accomplish the former and, although depleted by casualties, they launched a head-on rush to secure 'Bridge G' and form a bridgehead that enabled Captain Bob Montgomery and Lieutenant Corran Purdon and their demolition teams to exit the area.

The position was extremely exposed and with only the flimsiest cover they hung on for one and a half hours suffering casualties to half of the troop from a continuous fire that was directed onto them from unreachable guns on elevated positions on the far side of the St. Nazaire Submarine Basin, particularly two quadruple Oerlikons, and from ships in the Submarine Basin itself.

Roy was captured two days after the raid when a French policeman gave away their hiding place in a cellar. He was taken with other officers including Micky Burn, Bill "Tiger" Watson and Corran Purdon to Oflag IX-A, Spangenberg Castle. He later escaped in 1943 but was recaptured after 10 days and returned to Spangenberg. He was part of another failed escape attempt but remained as a POW until the end of the war.

To recognise their achievements, 89 decorations were awarded to participants in the raid. This total includes five Victoria Crosses awarded to Lieutenant Commander Beattie, Lieutenant Colonel Newman and Commander Ryder, Sergeant Durrant and Able Seaman Savage and four Distinguished Service Orders awarded to Roy, Major William Copland, Lieutenant T Boyd and Lieutenant TDL Platt.
