= Stephen Beattie =

Royal Navy officer Victoria Cross recipient (1908–1975)

Captain Stephen Beattie VC
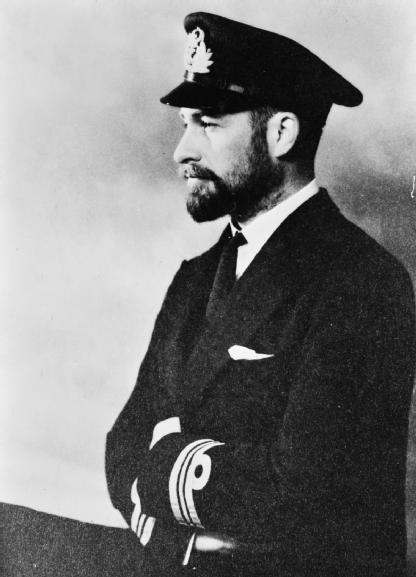
- Born: 29 March 1908; Leighton, Montgomeryshire, Wales
- Died: 20 April 1975 (aged 67); Mullion, Cornwall, England
- Burial place: Ruan Minor Churchyard
- Military career
- Allegiance: United Kingdom
- Branch: Royal Navy
- Service years: 1925–1960
- Rank: Captain
- Commands: HMS Birmingham; HMS Campbeltown
- Conflicts: World War II; St Nazaire Raid (POW)
- Awards: Victoria Cross; Croix de Guerre avec Palmes (France); Legion d'Honneur (France); Order of Menelik II (Ethiopia)
- Other work: Naval Adviser to the Ethiopian Government (1965)

Captain Stephen Halden Beattie VC (29 March 1908 – 20 April 1975) was a Welsh recipient of the Victoria Cross, the highest and most prestigious award for gallantry in the face of the enemy that can be awarded to British and Commonwealth forces.

== Biography ==
Beattie was born at Leighton, Montgomeryshire to Rev. Prebendary Ernest Halden Beattie, MC and Ethel Knowles. He was educated at Abberley Hall School in Worcester. He joined the Royal Navy in 1925 as a Special Entry Cadet.

Then-Lieutenant-Commander Beattie, a 33-year-old in command of the Royal Navy destroyer HMS Campbeltown, the tactical lynchpin of the St Nazaire Raid in 1942, was awarded the VC, recognized as being:

For great gallantry and determination in the attack on St. Nazaire in command of HMS Campbeltown. Under intense fire directed at the bridge from point blank range of about 100 yards, and in the face of the blinding glare of many searchlights, he steamed her into the lock-gates and beached and scuttled her in the correct position. This Victoria Cross is awarded to Lieutenant-Commander Beattie in recognition not only of his own valour but also of that of the unnamed officers and men of a very gallant ship's company, many of whom have not returned.

After grounding the ship, filled with hidden explosives which detonated the next day, successfully ruining Saint-Nazaire as a port for the Nazi Navy, Beattie was taken prisoner of war by the Germans. He spent the first part of his captivity in Frontstalag 133 at Rennes in France before being transferred to Marlag und Milag Nord, the POW camp for Royal Navy and Merchant Navy prisoners, near Bremen. He was notified of the award while in captivity, during a special parade at the camp. He remained in captivity until 10 April 1945 when, as part of a prisoner of war column evacuated from the prison camp by the Germans, he was liberated at Lübeck. He was later mentioned in despatches for his gallant bearing in captivity.

In 1947 Beattie received the French Légion d'honneur. He later achieved the rank of captain and served as Senior Naval Officer, Persian Gulf from April 1956 to April 1958. His last appointment circa 1957-60 was Commanding Officer HMS Birmingham and Flag Captain to Flag Officer, Flotillas, Home Fleet. He retired from the navy in July 1960. Later in the mid-1960s he was naval adviser to the Ethiopian government.

He died at Mullion, Cornwall. He is buried at Ruan Minor Churchyard near Helston, Cornwall, United Kingdom. In September 2023, a memorial tablet was dedicated to his memory by the Bishop of Hereford at his birthplace's parish church in Leighton.

On 14 September 2026 National Maritime Museum Cornwall launched a crowdfunder campaign to raise funds for a case to display Stephen Beattie's medals at the Museum, in Falmouth - as the location Operation Chariot departed from.
