= Etches =

Etches is a surname. Notable people by that name include:

- Adam Etches (born 1991), British professional boxer
- Bill Etches (1921–2015), British Army officer
- Matilda Etches (1898–1974), British fashion designer
- Stephen Etches, English translator of the Bible into Albanian
- Steve Etches (born 1949), English plumber and fossil collector
- Vera Etches (born 1975), Canadian physician
