= Karl-Conrad Mecke =

Recipient of the Knight's Cross (1894–1982)

- Born: 30 December 1894; Bremen, German Empire
- Died: 26 May 1982 (aged 87); Kiel, Schleswig-Holstein, West Germany
- Military career
- Allegiance: Nazi Germany
- Branch: Kriegsmarine
- Rank: Kapitän zur See
- Conflicts: World War II; St. Nazaire Raid; Operation Tanne Ost
- Awards: Knight's Cross of the Iron Cross

Karl-Conrad Mecke (30 December 1894 – 26 May 1982) was a Kapitän zur See with the Kriegsmarine during World War II and recipient of the Knight's Cross of the Iron Cross (German: Ritterkreuz des Eisernen Kreuzes). Until 1955, Mecke was held as a prisoner of war by Finland, then the Soviet Union.

== Awards ==
- Iron Cross (1914)
  - 2nd class
  - 1st Class
- Honour Cross of the World War 1914/1918
- Clasp to the Iron Cross (1939)
  - 2nd Class
  - 1st Class
- Naval Artillery War Badge
- Knight's Cross of the Iron Cross on 11 April 1943 as Kapitän zur See and commander of 22. Marine-Flak-Regiment
