= Richard Smeeton =

Royal Navy Vice Admiral (1912–1992)

Vice-Admiral Sir Richard Smeeton KCB MBE DL
- Born: 24 September 1912; Halifax, West Yorkshire
- Died: 29 March 1992 (aged 79); Guildford, Surrey
- Military career
- Allegiance: United Kingdom
- Branch: Royal Navy
- Service years: 1926–1965
- Rank: Vice-Admiral
- Commands: HMS Albion (1955–57); HMS Falcon (1952–54); HMS Alert (1947–48); 800 Naval Air Squadron (1940–41)
- Conflicts: Second World War
- Awards: Knight Commander of the Order of the Bath; Member of the Order of the British Empire

Vice-Admiral Sir Richard Michael Smeeton, KCB, MBE, DL (24 September 1912 – 29 March 1992) was a Royal Navy officer who served as Deputy Supreme Allied Commander Atlantic from 1962 to 1964.

== Naval career ==
Educated at the Royal Naval College, Dartmouth, Smeeton joined the Royal Navy in 1926. He served in World War II with 804 Naval Air Squadron taking part in the Norwegian Campaign. He continued his war service as Officer Commanding 800 Naval Air Squadron from June 1940. During his service as assistant naval attaché in Washington, D.C. from May 1941, he personally ordered a series US-built aircraft for the Fleet Air Arm. Fortunately, their Lordships at the Admiralty and the government endorsed his bold and expensive action. Later he was Air Plans Officer to the Commander-in-Chief, Pacific Fleet from 1943. He was appointed Captain of the aircraft carrier HMS Albion in 1955, Director of Plans at the Admiralty in 1956 and Flag Officer, Aircraft Carriers in 1960. He went on to be Deputy Supreme Allied Commander Atlantic in 1962, and retired from the navy in November 1965.

In retirement he became Chief Executive of the Society of British Aircraft Constructors and Deputy Lieutenant of Surrey.

Military offices
Preceded by Sir Charles Evans	Deputy Supreme Allied Commander Atlantic; 1962–1964	Succeeded by Sir William Beloe
