= William Alfred Savage =

English recipient of the Victoria Cross

- Born: 30 October 1912; Smethwick, Staffordshire, England
- Died: 28 March 1942; St. Nazaire, France
- Burial place: Town Cemetery, Falmouth
- Military career
- Allegiance: United Kingdom
- Branch: Royal Navy
- Service years: 1939–1942
- Rank: Able Seaman
- Conflicts: Second World War: St. Nazaire Raid
- Awards: Victoria Cross

William Alfred Savage, VC (30 October 1912 – 28 March 1942) was a Royal Navy sailor and a recipient of the Victoria Cross, the highest award for gallantry in the face of the enemy that can be awarded to British and Commonwealth forces.

== Details ==
Savage was 29 years old, and an able seaman in the Royal Navy during the Second World War, when the following deed took place for which he was awarded the Victoria Cross.

On 28 March 1942, in the St. Nazaire Raid, France, Savage, who was a gun-layer of a pom-pom in MGB 314, engaged enemy positions ashore, shooting with great accuracy. Although he had no gun-shield and was in a most exposed position, he continued firing with great coolness until he was finally killed at his gun.

The official citation noted "This Victoria Cross is awarded in recognition not only of the gallantry and devotion to duty of Able Seaman Savage, but also of the valour shown by many others, unnamed, in Motor Launches, Motor Gun Boats and Motor Torpedo Boats, who gallantly carried out their duty in entirely exposed positions against Enemy fire at very close range"

== Legacy ==
Savage is buried in Grave 15, Row C, Section K (the War Graves section) at Falmouth Cemetery, Cornwall.

His Victoria Cross is displayed at the National Maritime Museum, Greenwich, England.

Savage Road located near Devonport Naval Base, Plymouth, Devonshire was named in his honour.
