= William Beloe (Royal Navy officer) =

British admiral

Vice-Admiral Sir William Beloe KBE CB DSC
- Vice Admiral Beloe in 1961
- Born: 9 December 1909
- Died: 3 April 1966 (aged 56)
- Military career
- Allegiance: United Kingdom
- Branch: Royal Navy
- Service years: 1923–1966
- Rank: Vice-Admiral
- Commands: HMS Campbeltown; HMS Cotton; HMS Contest; HMS Dainty; HMS Ocean
- Conflicts: World War II
- Awards: Knight Commander of the Order of the British Empire; Companion of the Order of the Bath; Distinguished Service Cross

Vice-Admiral Sir Isaac William Trant Beloe KBE CB DSC (9 December 1909 – 3 April 1966) was a Royal Navy officer who became Deputy Supreme Allied Commander Atlantic.

== Naval career ==
Beloe joined the Royal Navy in 1923. He served in World War II commanding the destroyer HMS Campbeltown and frigate HMS Cotton in the Western Approaches, Western Mediterranean and Russian convoys. After the War he commanded the destroyer HMS Contest and then became Deputy Director of the Royal Navy Staff College before commanding the destroyer HMS Dainty and then the aircraft carrier HMS Ocean. He was appointed Commodore commanding the Pakistan Flotilla in 1957, Commodore in charge of the Royal Navy Barracks, Devonport in 1959 and Flag Officer, Medway and Admiral Superintendent, Chatham in 1961. He was promoted to vice-admiral on 30 May 1963. His last appointment was as Deputy Supreme Allied Commander Atlantic in 1964 before his sudden death from a heart attack as he left his home in 1966.

Military offices
Preceded by Sir Richard Smeeton	Deputy Supreme Allied Commander Atlantic; 1964–1966	Succeeded by Sir David Clutterbuck
