= Micky Burn =

British soldier, journalist, writer and poet (1912–2010)

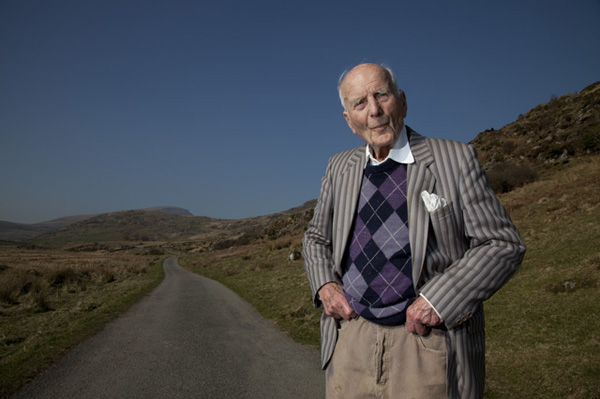
- Burn filming "Turned Towards the Sun" in 2009
- Born: Michael Clive Burn; 11 December 1912; London, England
- Died: 3 September 2010 (aged 97); Minffordd, Gwynedd, Wales
- Occupations: Journalist, commando, writer, poet
- Years active: 1946–2006 (as author)
- Spouse: Mary Booker (m.1947–1974: her death)
- Military career
- Allegiance: United Kingdom
- Branch: British Army
- Service years: 1937–1945 (army service)
- Rank: Captain
- Service number: 74087
- Units: Queen's Westminsters; No. 2 Commando
- Operations: St Nazaire Raid
- Awards: Military Cross

Captain Michael Clive Burn, MC (11 December 1912 – 3 September 2010) was an English journalist, commando, writer and poet.

== Early life ==
Michael Clive "Micky" Burn, born 11 December 1912 in London, was the eldest of four children, the son of Clive Burn (1882–1955) and Phyllis Burn (née Stoneham; 1883–1968).

Burn's father was secretary and solicitor to the Duchy of Cornwall, becoming a trusted confidant of the King. His mother's family was instrumental in developing the golf-and-gambling resort of Le Touquet, the fashionable seaside resort in Hauts-de-France.

Initially educated at Winchester College, Burn spent only one year at New College, Oxford before the social seductions of Le Touquet won out. As he himself put it, he was not sent down: having done none of the work expected of him, he simply did not go back, choosing instead to initiate a writing career by ghosting the autobiography of "Bentley Boy" Sir Henry Birkin.

Burn spent time in Florence, befriending Alice Keppel, the former mistress of Edward VII. A bisexual man, his lovers included later Soviet Union spy Guy Burgess. On two occasions during the 1930s Burn took himself to the police to avoid being blackmailed for the crime of homosexual conduct.

By his own admission, in earlier life he "had been drawn to three autocracies: German National Socialism, Communism, and the Roman Catholic Church." A developing interest in bettering the lot of the socially and economically deprived led Burn to a brief dalliance with National Socialism at a time when Hitler was regarded by many as having cured unemployment and given Germany back her soul. He met the German leader in 1936, who signed his copy of Mein Kampf (lost, shortly thereafter). He also attended a Nazi Party Rally at Nuremberg, standing on the dais just a few feet behind the Führer himself. An unquestioning tour of Dachau crowned a period of which he later wrote that he was for a time duped by a combination of his own blindness and the "intensely organized falsehood" that would later be exposed as the engine of the 'New' Germany.

In 1936, Burn joined The Times newspaper, initially on probation on the Home Editorial desk. Here he remained until the outbreak of war, with but a brief stint in London as Diplomatic Correspondent. In 1937, with Hitler's intentions becoming ever more clear, Burn enlisted in the Queen's Westminsters, a Territorial battalion of the King's Royal Rifle Corps. Commissioned Second Lieutenant in 1938, he had, by the outbreak of war, wholly abandoned National Socialism as an engine of social change.

== St. Nazaire Raid ==
When World War II came, Burn was at once called up. Upon their formation in 1939–40, he volunteered for the independent companies, formed from men willing to undertake exceptional risks. Having served in Norway in 1940, as part of the failed Allied campaign to counter the German invasion, Burn joined a new elite force known as the Commandos.

In March 1942, as a Captain in command of number 6 Troop, No. 2 Commando, he took part in Operation Chariot, the St. Nazaire Raid, his own 6 Troop contributing 29 men to the overall total of 264 Army personnel taking part. As leader of the starboard column of troop carried in several Motor Launches (MLs), Burn's ML192 was one of the first vessels to come under fire, crashing ablaze into the Old Mole. Of his 6 Troop contingent, 14 men were killed. The rest, many of whom were forced to take to the water, were captured early on.

Having been hauled ashore by one of his men, and despite being wounded several times, Burn was able to make his way to his target, the only member of his team to do so. Burn later attempted to escape the tightening German cordon along with two of his men, one of whom was killed. Burn, along with his remaining companion, was captured and entered a lengthy period of confinement as a "guest of the Reich".

For his actions during the raid Burn received the award of the Military Cross. Of the 609 soldiers and sailors who entered the Loire estuary that night, five were awarded the Victoria Cross – the greatest number for any single action during the war.

== Colditz ==
Following his capture Burn was first sent to Marlag und Milag Nord, a naval POW camp that was the destination of all Charioteers prior to the separation of Commando and Royal Navy personnel. He was then incarcerated in Spangenberg Castle, Oflag IX-A/H, where he began giving lectures to fellow POWs before being sent to Colditz Castle, Oflag IV-C. There, using shorthand learnt for his previous employment in journalism, Burn acted as scribe to Colditz's secret radio operator, Lieutenant-Colonel Jimmy Yule.

At Colditz Burn studied for an Oxford diploma and wrote a novel fictionalizing his years as a prisoner, which was published as Yes, Farewell in 1946. Ben Macintyre wrote that it was the only good novel from a Colditz prisoner of war. On liberation, Burn sent dispatches to The Times that appeared in the newspaper on 19 and 21 April 1945; they were the first detailed published descriptions of a prisoner-of-war camp.

While at Colditz, Burn had received a Red Cross parcel from an old Dutch friend and former lover, Ella van Heemstra. After his release from Colditz, Burn sent packages with food and cigarettes to van Heemstra. The food helped the malnourished van Heemstra and her daughter, Audrey (future actress and humanitarian activist Audrey Hepburn), survive the hardships following the end of the war. Van Heemstra sold the cigarettes for penicillin on the black market to treat the seriously ill Hepburn, perhaps saving her life.

Burn ended the war as a captain.

== After the Second World War ==
When the war ended Burn returned to The Times. His first assignment – while waiting for a visa to Moscow as permanent correspondent – was to Vienna. After several months of waiting in vain for the Moscow visa, he suggested to the editor of The Times that he instead go behind the Iron Curtain to Hungary to observe the government takeover by the Hungarian Communist Party supported by the Red Army. As a consequence, he became the main British reporter on the political purges and the faked trial of Cardinal József Mindszenty.

Burn wrote nine books of non-fiction, four novels and six books of poetry. He enjoyed reading his poetry aloud at regional poetry events. He also wrote a play, The Night of the Ball, which opened in London's West End in 1954 starring Gladys Cooper.

== Private life ==
Although Burn left Colditz believing that he was entirely homosexual, he almost immediately met and fell in love with a woman, despite continuing to have affairs with men. Burn married Mary Booker (1897–1974) on 27 March 1947; Booker had been divorced from her husband in 1926. The couple moved to North Wales where Bertrand Russell and his last wife, Edith, became first neighbours and then close friends before Russell's death in 1970. Following Mary's death in August 1974, Burn discovered her love letters to Richard Hillary, with whom she had been in love from December 1941 until Hillary was killed in January 1943. Burn subsequently wrote his book Mary & Richard (1988) as a commemoration.

Burn's autobiography, Turned Towards the Sun, was published in 2003.

== Death ==
Burn died in his sleep after suffering a stroke at his residence in Minffordd, North Wales on 3 September 2010, at the age of 97.

== Biographies ==
Mickey Burn's experiences as a commando and as a prisoner of war form the centrepiece of Peter Stanley's book, Commando to Colditz: Mickey Burn's Journey To the Far Side of Tears, published by Murdoch Books, Sydney, 2009.

A documentary about the life of Micky Burn, titled Turned Towards the Sun, was filmed in 2008 and 2009 and produced by James Dorrian, Nick Golding, Laura Morris, Greg Olliver and associate produced by Robert Ozn. It premièred at the British Film Institute (BFI) London Film Festival in 2012. The film's director, Greg Olliver, earned a BFI Grierson Award nomination. (Olliver also co-directed Lemmy, the documentary about Lemmy Kilmister of Motörhead.)

== Bibliography ==
Factual:

- Full Throttle (for Henry Birkin)
- Wheels Take Wings (a history of Brooklands)
- Alan Parson's Scrapbook (an anthology, with Violet Tree)
- The Labyrinth of Europe
- The Debatable Land
- The Age of Slate
- Mr Lywards Answer. The story of George Lyward and Finchden Manor (Hamish Hamilton, 1956)
- Turned Towards the Sun – An Autobiography. (Michael Russell, 2003) includes The Flying Castle
- Mary & Richard (Mandarin, 1988). The story of Richard Hillary and Mary Booker

Fiction:

- Yes, Farewell
- Childhood at Oriol
- The Midnight Diary
- The Trouble With Jake

Poetry:

- Poems as Accompaniment to a Life (Michael Russell, 2006)
- Poems To Mary
- The Flying Castle
- Out on a Limb
- Open Day And Night

Play:

- The Modern Everyman

Film:

- Turned Towards The Sun (2012)

== See also ==
- Donald William Roy
