= HMS Campbeltown (I42) =

Royal Navy destroyer used in the St. Nazaire Raid

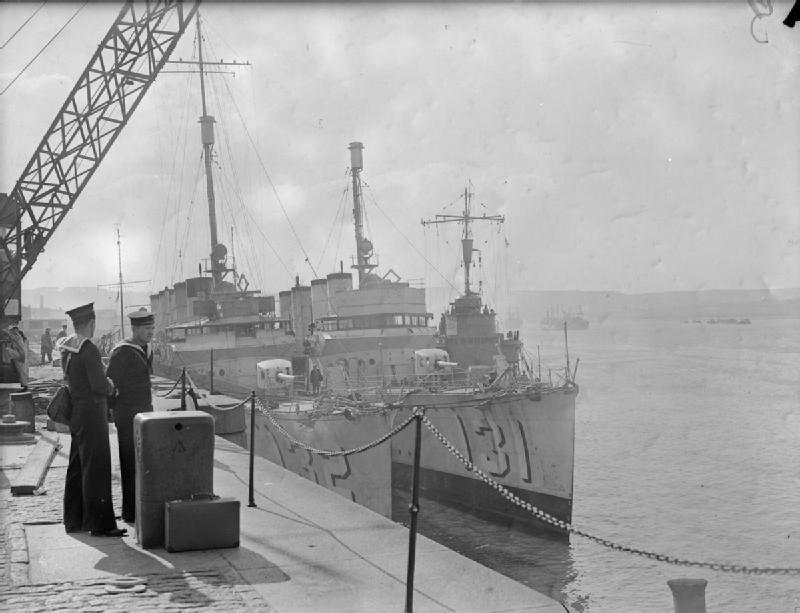
- The newly transferred HMS Campbeltown (right) alongside her sister HMS Castleton

History

United States
- Name: Buchanan
- Namesake: Franklin Buchanan
- Builder: Bath Iron Works, Bath, Maine, US
- Laid down: 29 June 1918
- Launched: 2 January 1919
- Commissioned: 20 January 1919
- Decommissioned: In reserve from 1939
- Fate: Transferred to the Royal Navy on 3 September 1940

United Kingdom
- Name: Campbeltown
- Namesake: Campbeltown, Scotland
- Commissioned: 9 September 1940
- Honours and awards: Atlantic 1941–42; St Nazaire 1942
- Fate: Expended on 28 March 1942 in a special operation against the docks at Saint-Nazaire
- Badge: On a Field White, within an annulet Blue charged in base with a mullet White a sprig of myrtle proper.

General characteristics
- Class & type: Wickes-class destroyer; Town-class destroyer
- Displacement: 1,260 long tons (1,280 t)
- Length: 314 ft 4 in (95.81 m)
- Beam: 30 ft 6 in (9.30 m)
- Draught: 9 ft (2.7 m) (light); 12 ft (3.7 m) (full load)
- Installed power: 30,000 shp (22,000 kW)
- Propulsion: 2 × Brown-Curtiss single reduction geared steam turbines; 4 × Normand return-flame boilers; 2 × shafts
- Speed: Design: 35.5 kn (40.9 mph; 65.7 km/h); Trials (1919): 39.7 kn (45.7 mph; 73.5 km/h)
- Complement: 158
- Armament: As built: 4 × 4 in (100 mm)/50 cal guns; 1 × 3 in (76 mm)/23 cal anti-aircraft gun; 6 × 21 in (530 mm) torpedo tubes; Conversion for St Nazaire Raid: 1 × 12-pounder gun; 8 × 20 mm (0.79 in) Oerlikon anti-aircraft cannons; 4.5 short tons (4.1 t) amatol explosive charge (consisting of 24 × Mark VII depth charges)

HMS Campbeltown was a Town-class destroyer of the Royal Navy (RN) during the Second World War. She was originally US destroyer USS Buchanan, and was one of 50 obsolescent US Navy destroyers transferred to the RN in 1940 as part of the Destroyers for Bases Agreement. Between 17 January 1941 and 15 October 1941 she also briefly served in the Royal Netherlands Navy as HNLMS Campbeltown before being returned to the RN. Campbeltown became one of the most famous of these ships when she was used in the St Nazaire Raid in 1942.

== Service history ==
=== As USS Buchanan ===
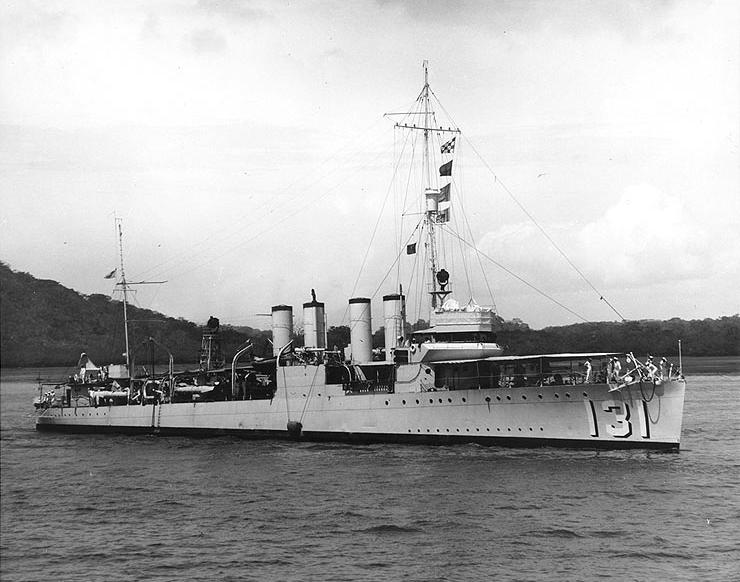
Starboard side view of Campbeltown as USS Buchanan in 1936

USS Buchanan was a Wickes-class destroyer, ordered from the Bath Iron Works, Bath, Maine, and laid down on 29 June 1918. She was launched on 2 January 1919 and commissioned into the Navy on 20 January. She had a typical inter-war career, and was placed into the reserve in 1939. She then became one of 50 destroyers transferred to the Royal Navy in 1940 after the finalisation of the Destroyers for Bases Agreement. She was transferred on 3 September 1940 and commissioned on 9 September at Halifax, Canada. That very same day, Lieutenant Isaac William Trant Beloe became her captain.

=== As HMS Campbeltown ===
Having been formally commissioned, she took passage from Halifax to Plymouth, travelling via St John's, Newfoundland. She arrived at Devonport Dockyard on 29 September and was taken in hand for modifications to fit her for service with the Royal Navy. The refits lasted throughout October, and on completion of the final harbour trials on 1 November 1940 she was nominated to join the 17th Flotilla operating in the Western Approaches. The next day, while carrying out sea trials she collided with SS Risoy and sustained damage, but continued and arrived safely at Liverpool, where she underwent repairs from 7 to 24 November. She then joined the flotilla.

On 29 November, she ran down and sank the British coaster Fiddown in the Mersey Estuary. She began deploying with the flotilla in early December, but on 3 December she collided with SS Comus and had to put into port for repairs again. The repairs lasted until late March, and involved the shortening of the fourth funnel.

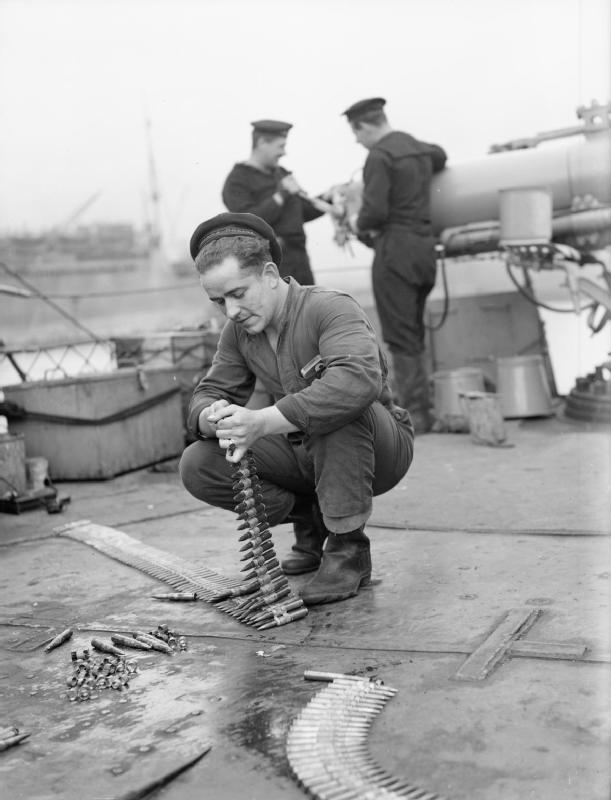
Dutch sailors on HNLMS Campbeltown.

=== As HNLMS Campbeltown ===
While still being repaired Campbeltown was transferred on 12 January 1941 to the Royal Netherlands Navy and commissioned on 17 January 1941 as HNLMS Campbeltown. Lieutenant Isaac William Trant Beloe was replaced by Lieutenant William Harmsen. The Dutch proposed to rename her Middelburg, but this was not agreed as it would have been contrary to the naming agreed with the US Navy. On completion of her repairs Campbeltown joined on 6 April 1941 the 7th Escort Group and had during this time Liverpool as her homeport. She underwent further repairs throughout June and resumed convoy defence with the group in July–August. She was then nominated to be returned to the Royal Navy in September, but remained with the 7th Escort Group. She spent September working up with her Royal Navy crew and was returned on 15 October 1941 to the Royal Navy. That same month she rejoined the group, where she covered convoys between Britain and West Africa. On 15 September she picked up the survivors of the Norwegian motor tanker Vinga, which had been damaged in an enemy air attack. She carried out escort duties in November–December, before taking passage to Devonport to undergo repairs.

=== The St Nazaire Raid ===
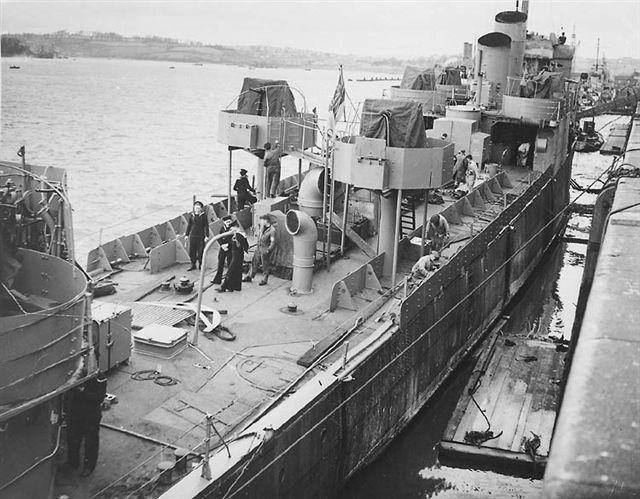
HMS Campbeltown being converted

Campbeltown began the Devonport repairs in January. During this time, she was selected for a special operation and was withdrawn from regular service for modifications. She was to be used in Operation Chariot, a planned assault operation on the docks at Saint-Nazaire. In 1942 the German battleship Tirpitz—anchored at Trondheim in Norway—was considered to present a grave threat to Atlantic convoys. Should Tirpitz enter the Atlantic, the Louis Joubert drydock at Saint-Nazaire—which had originally been built for the liner SS Normandie—was a vital target; it was the only German-held drydock on the European coast of the Atlantic that was large enough to service the battleship. If this drydock could be put out of action, any offensive sortie by Tirpitz into the Atlantic would be much more dangerous for the Kriegsmarine to carry out, making it less likely that they would risk deploying her.

Operation Chariot was a plan to ram an explosive-laden warship into the dock gates. Accompanying her would be 18 small boats carrying British Commandos, who would destroy the dock's pumping and winding machinery and other infrastructure. The troops would then be evacuated by the small boats before the explosives in the ship detonated. A particular difficulty was that the dock was located several miles up the estuary of the Loire River. As an obsolescent destroyer, Campbeltown was considered to be expendable and was selected to be the ram-ship. She spent February undergoing modifications. These included removing her third and fourth funnels and having the remaining two funnels raked to simulate the structure and appearance of a German Raubvogel-class torpedo boat. A 12-pounder gun was installed forward and eight 20 mm (0.79 in) Oerlikon anti-aircraft cannon were mounted on the upper deck. Some extra armour was provided to protect the bridge structure, and unnecessary stores and equipment were removed to lighten the destroyer.

An explosive charge consisting of 24 Mark VII depth charges—containing a total of 4.5 short tons (4.1 t) of amatol high explosive—was fitted into steel tanks installed just behind the steel pillar that supported her most forward gun mount. The charges were to be detonated by multiple eight-hour time pencils connected together by cordtex, set before steaming out and cemented in to prevent any interference with the detonation. Campbeltown steamed from Devonport to Falmouth, Cornwall on 25 March to join the other ships that would take part in the operation. The crew—which would be evacuated with the commandos—was reduced to 75 men, under the command of Lieutenant Commander Stephen Beattie.

A flotilla of 21 vessels—Campbeltown, 16 Fairmile B motor launches, one motor torpedo boat and a Fairmile C motor gun boat acting as the troops' headquarters—left Falmouth at 14:00 on 26 March 1942, escorted for most of the crossing to France by two Hunt-class escort destroyers. (HMS Tynedale and HMS Atherstone) Apart from a brief clash with German submarine U-593, whose captain misreported the task force's course and composition, the ships reached France unmolested. One motor launch suffered mechanical problems and had to return to England.

The preliminary air raid carried out through heavy cloud by 35 Armstrong Whitworth Whitleys and 25 Vickers Wellingtons was much smaller than originally planned and was ineffective, merely alerting the defenders of something unusual happening. Nevertheless, by flashing genuine German recognition signals, the force, with Campbeltown flying the flag of the Kriegsmarine, approached to within less than 1 mi (1.6 km) of the harbour before being fired upon. Campbeltown—as the largest target—drew most of the fire. During the final approach, the crew of Campbeltown lowered the emblem of the Kriegsmarine and hoisted the battle ensign of the Royal Navy.

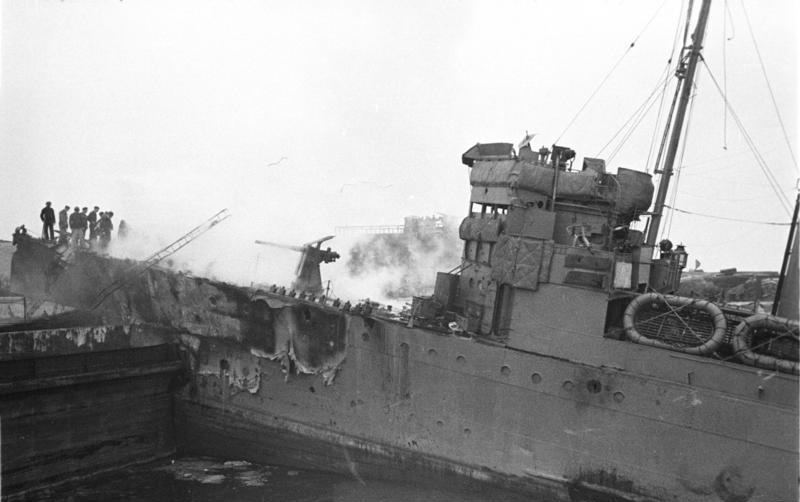
German photo of HMS Campbeltown, taken before it exploded

At 01:34 on 28 March, four minutes later than planned, Campbeltown rammed the dock gate. The Commandos and ship's crew came ashore under heavy German fire and set about demolishing the dock machinery. 169 of the raiders were killed (64 commandos and 105 sailors) out of the 611 men in the attacking force. Of the survivors, 215 were captured and 222 were evacuated by the surviving small craft. A further five evaded capture and travelled overland through France to Spain and then to Gibraltar, a British territory.

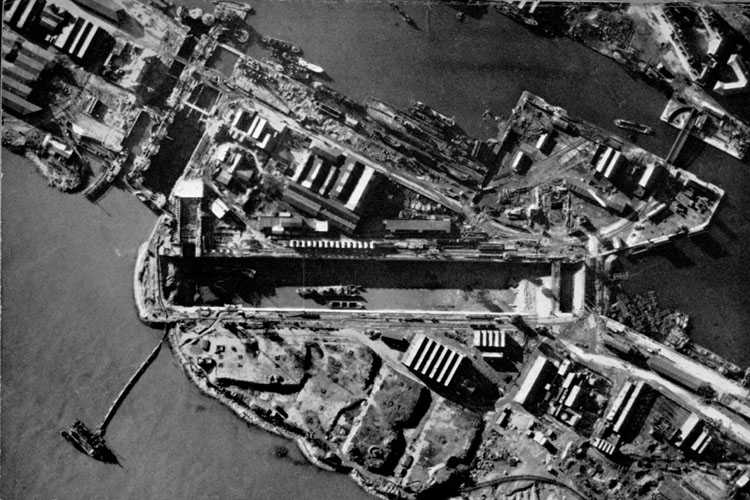
Normandie Dock months after the raid. The wreck of Campbeltown is visible inside the dry dock

The charges in Campbeltown exploded at noon, an hour and a half later than the British had expected. Although the ship had been searched by the Germans, the explosives had not been detected. The explosion killed around 250 German soldiers and French civilians and demolished both the front half of the destroyer and the 160 short tons (150 t) caisson of the drydock, with the rush of water into the drydock washing the remains of the ship into it. The Saint-Nazaire drydock was rendered unusable for the rest of the war and was not repaired until 1947, and only resumed normal service in 1948.

The delayed-action torpedoes fired by the motor torpedo boat into the outer lock gate to the submarine basin detonated, as planned, on the night of 30 March. This later explosion led to panic, with German forces firing on French civilians and on each other. Sixteen French civilians were killed and around thirty wounded. Later, 1,500 civilians were arrested and interned in a camp at Savenay and most of their houses were demolished, even though they had had nothing to do with the raid. Beattie—who was taken prisoner—received the Victoria Cross for his valour and in 1947 received the French Légion d'honneur. His Victoria Cross was one of five awarded to participants in the raid, along with 80 other military decorations.

== Legacy ==
The ship's bell of HMS Campbeltown was given to the town of Campbelltown, Pennsylvania, as a gesture of appreciation towards the United States for the Destroyers for Bases Agreement programme. This ship's bell was later lent by the town to the subsequent HMS Campbeltown, a Type 22 frigate, when she was commissioned in 1989 and was returned on 21 June 2011 after HMS Campbeltown was decommissioned.

The 1952 film The Gift Horse was loosely based on the story of HMS Campbeltown.
