= Operation Avalanche naval order of battle =

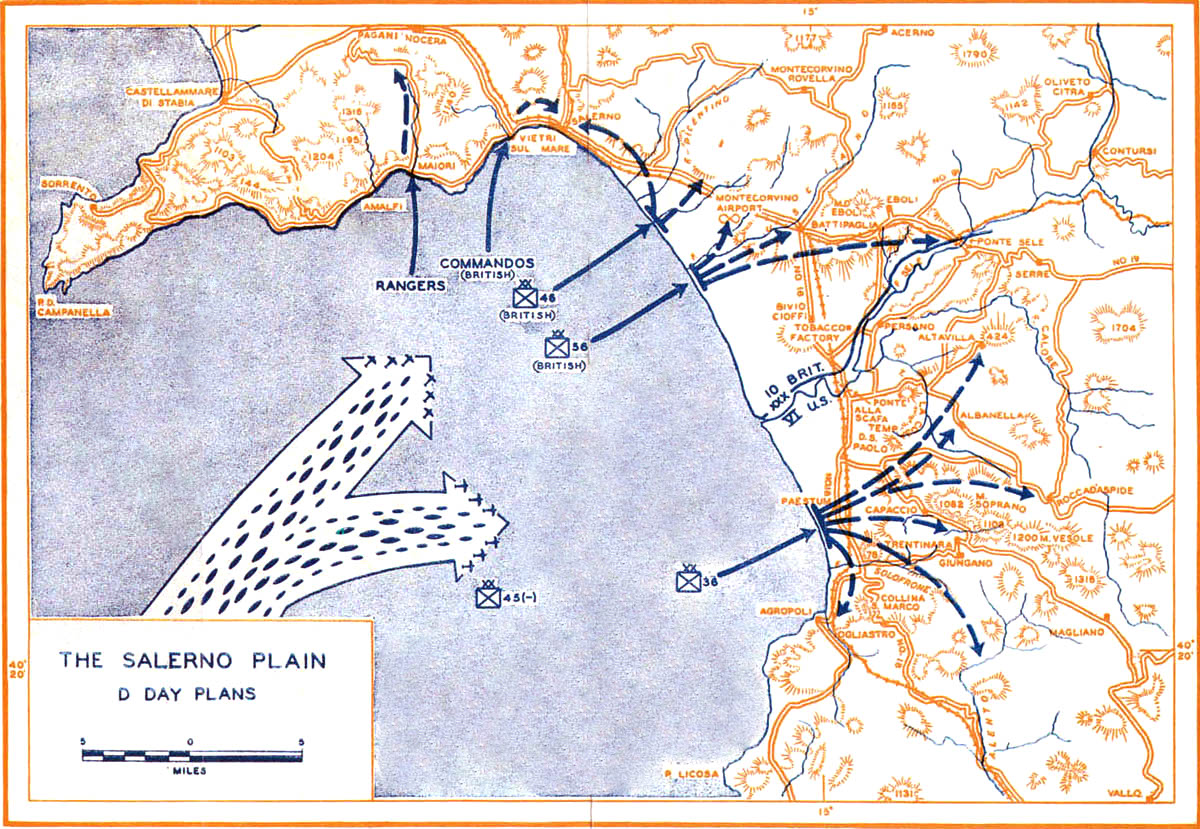
Landing Plans for Salerno and Paestum

Operation Avalanche was the codename for the combined US and British landings on the southwest coast of Italy on 9 September 1943 as part of the Allied effort in the Mediterranean Theater during World War II. The forces landed consisted of the US Fifth Army under Lieutenant General Mark W. Clark. The Fifth Army was made up of the British X Corps, which landed south of the town of Salerno, and the US VI Corps, which landed at the town of Paestum.

The landings were carried out by combined forces of the US Navy and Royal Navy.

Naval losses: 2 destroyers, 1 minesweeper, 1 tug, 1 hospital ship

== Order of battle ==
Vice Adm. H. Kent Hewitt, USN

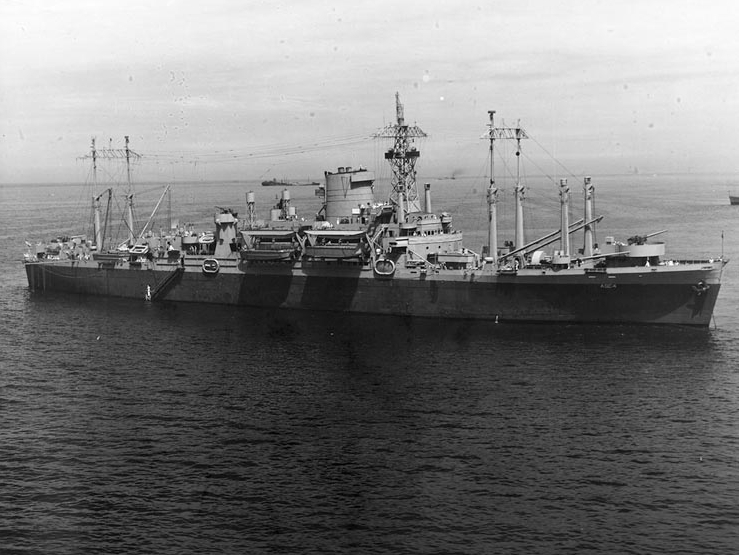
Vice Adm. Hewitt's flagship, USS Ancon (AGC-4)

=== Western Naval Task Force (Task Force 80) ===
Vice Admiral H. Kent Hewitt, USN

Embarking US Fifth Army (Lt. Gen. Mark W. Clark, USA)

1 amphibious force flagship: USS Ancon
2 anti-aircraft/fighter director ships: HMS Ulster Queen, HMS Palomares
1 submarine: HMS Shakespeare

==== Northern Landing Force (Task Force 85) ====
Commodore G.N. Oliver, RN

Embarking British X Corps (Lt. Gen. Richard McCreery, BA)

Combat vessels

4 light cruisers: HMS Mauritius, HMS Uganda, HMS Orion, HMS Delhi
1 monitor: HMS Roberts
18 destroyers: 17 British, 1 Greek

Amphibious assault vessels

2 amphibious force flagships: HMS Hilary, USS Biscayne
13 transports and LSIs
90 LSTs: 45 American, 45 British
84 LCTs: 24 American, 60 British (5 sunk)
96 LCI(L)s: 48 American, 48 British

Auxiliaries

7 minesweepers
4 tugs (1 sunk by air attack 13 September)
23 subchasers/wooden hull
27 minecraft
32 motor launches
13 trawlers

==== Southern Landing Force (Task Force 81) ====
Rear Adm. John L. Hall, Jr., USN

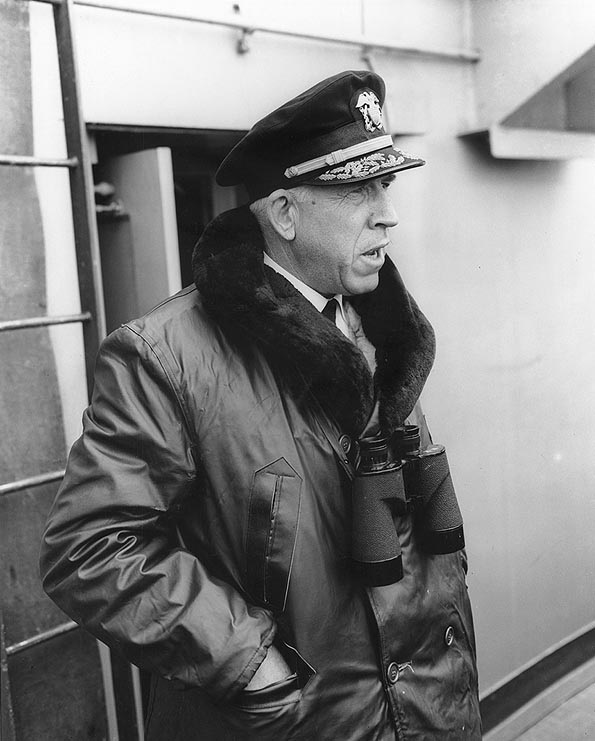
Rear Adm. John L. Hall, Jr., USN

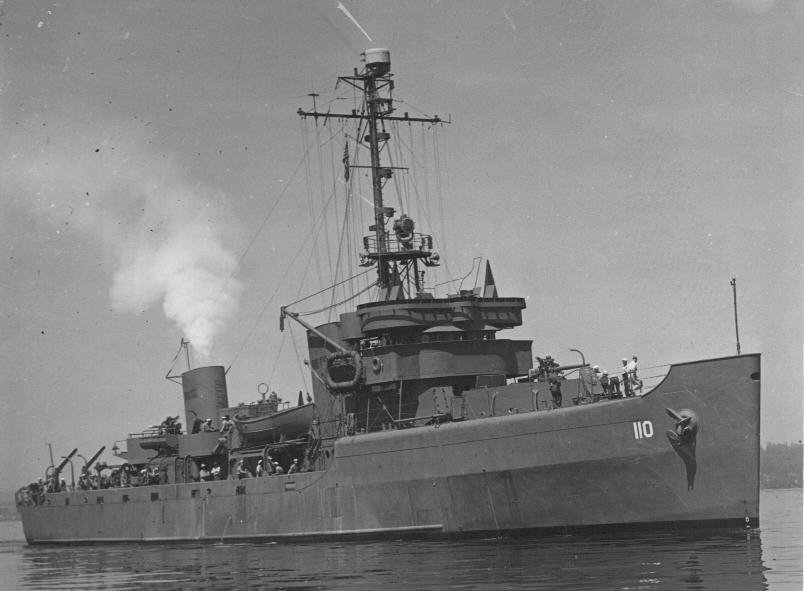
USS Revenge, a World War II-era Auk class minesweeper

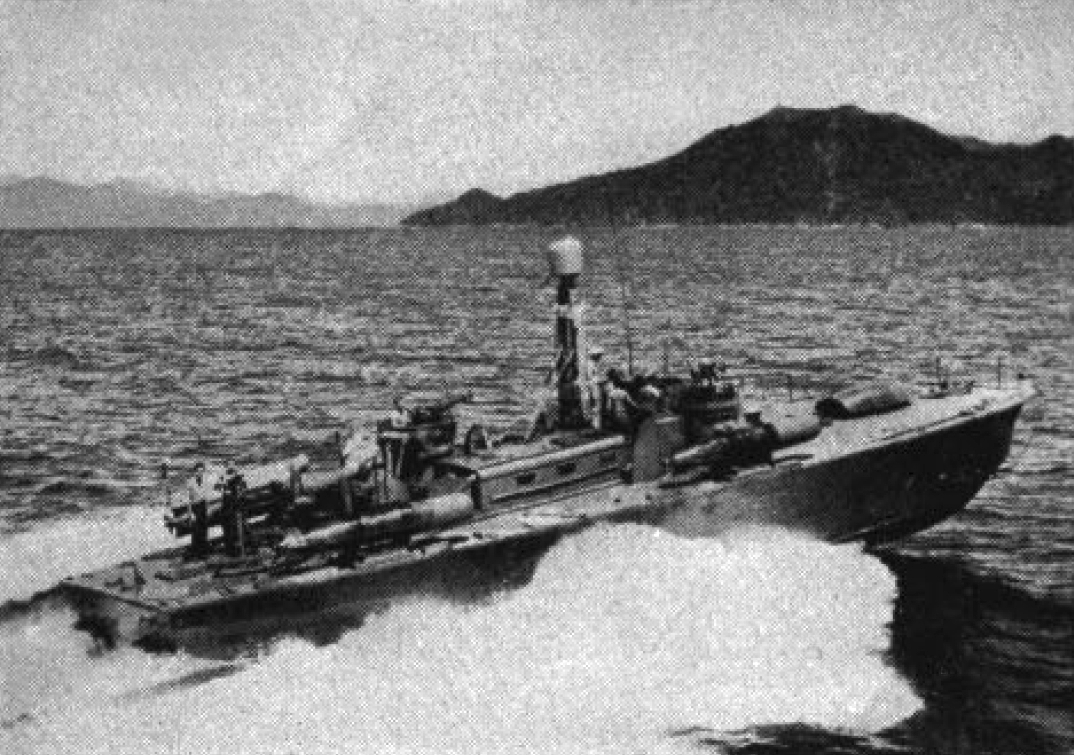
World War II-era US PT boat in 1945

Embarking US VI Corps (Maj. Gen. Ernest J. Dawley, USA)

Fire Support Group (TG 81.5)
Rear Admiral Lyal A. Davidson

4 light cruisers: USS Philadelphia, USS Savannah, USS Boise, USS Brooklyn
1 monitor: HMS Abercrombie
4 destroyers (1 sunk by submarine 12 October)

Screen (TG 81.6)
Capt. Charles Wellborn

12 destroyers (1 sunk by torpedo boat 10 September)

Transport Group (TG 81.2)
Capt. C.D. Edgar

19 transports: 14 American, 5 British
3 LSTs: all British
6 scout boats

Landing Craft Group (TG 81.3)
Capt. F.M. Adams

27 LSTs: 18 American, 9 British
32 LCIs: 26 American, 6 British
6 LCTs: all American

Control Group (TG 81.7)
Cmdr. R.D. Lowther, USNR

8 subchasers (steel hull), 4 LCSs

TG 81.8 – Minesweeper Group
Cmdr. A.H. Richards

9 minesweepers (1 sunk by submarine 25 September)
12 motor minesweepers

TG 81.9 – Salvage Group
Lt. V.C. Kyllberg

2 tugs

TG 80.2 – Picket Group
Lt. Cmdr. S.M. Barnes

16 PTs

TG 80.3 – Diversion Group
Capt. C.L. Andrews

1 destroyer: USS Knight
7 torpedo boats: 7 British MTBs, 1 American PT
4 subchasers (wooden hull)
6 Motor Launches
10 air/sea rescue craft

==== Support Carrier Force (Task Force 88) ====
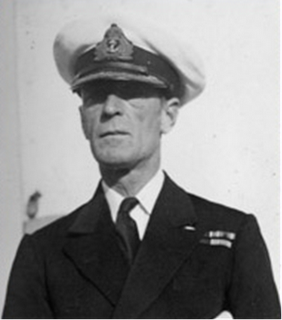
Rear Adm. Sir Philip L. Vian, RN

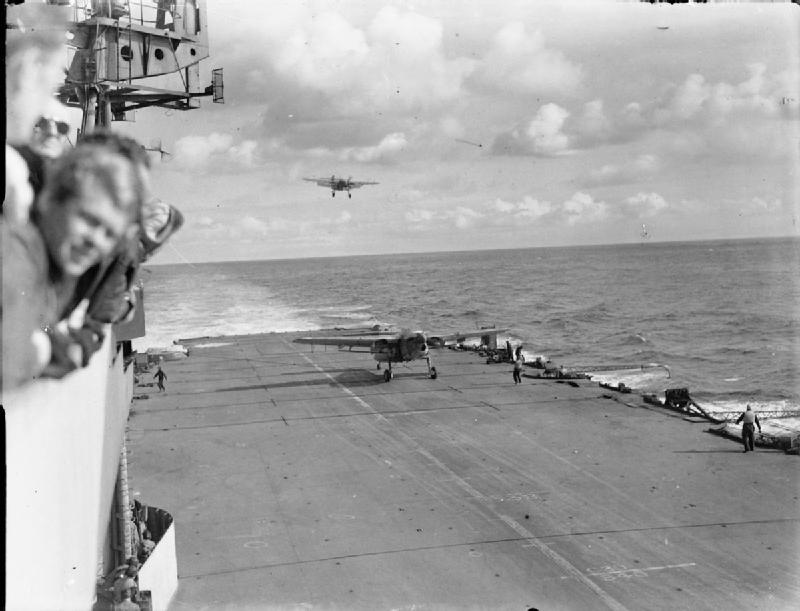
Fairey Barracudas landing on HMS Formidable in 1944

Rear Admiral Sir Philip L. Vian, RN

1 light carrier: HMS Unicorn
4 escort carriers: HMS Battler, HMS Attacker, HMS Hunter, HMS Stalker
3 light cruisers: HMS Euryalus, HMS Scylla, HMS Charybdis
9 destroyers: 7 British, 2 Polish

Covering forces

2 fleet carriers (Rear Admiral Clement Moody, RN)

HMS Illustrious

28 Grumman Martlet fighters
10 Supermarine Seafire fighters
12 Fairey Barracuda torpedo bombers

HMS Formidable

28 Grumman Martlet fighters
5 Supermarine Seafire fighters
12 Fairey Albacore torpedo bombers (Note: Biplanes)

Force "H" (Vice Admiral Sir Algernon Willis, RN)

4 battleships: HMS Nelson, HMS Rodney, HMS Warspite, HMS Valiant

Screen

20 destroyers: 16 British, 1 Polish, 2 Dutch, 1 French

Auxiliaries

3 hospital ships: HMHS Newfoundland (sunk by air attack 13 September), HMHS Leinster, HMHS Somersetshire

== Sources ==
- Morison, Samuel Eliot (1954). Sicily – Salerno – Anzio, January 1943–June 1944. History of United States Naval Operations in World War II. Vol. IX. Boston: Little, Brown and Co. ISBN 0-7858-1310-1.
