= Stalag 133 =

German prisoner of war camp during World War II from 1940 to 1943

- Rennes, German-occupied France

Site information
- Type: Prisoner-of-war camp
- Controlled by: Nazi Germany

Site history
- In use: 1940–1943
- Battles/wars: World War II

Garrison information
- Occupants: French and British prisoners of war

Frontstalag 133 was a temporary German prisoner-of-war camp during World War II located near Rennes in German-occupied northern France. It operated from late 1940 to October 1943. It housed prisoners from French Colonial Forces.

About 200 of the captured British Commando troops from the St. Nazaire Raid were taken there, then sent on to other camps in Germany.

== See also ==
- St. Nazaire Raid

== Sources ==
- POW camps in France
- Story of James Laurie, taken POW
