= Louis Joubert Lock =

Dry dock and lock in the port of Saint-Nazaire, Loire-Atlantique, France

Coordinates: 47°16′38″N 2°11′50″W

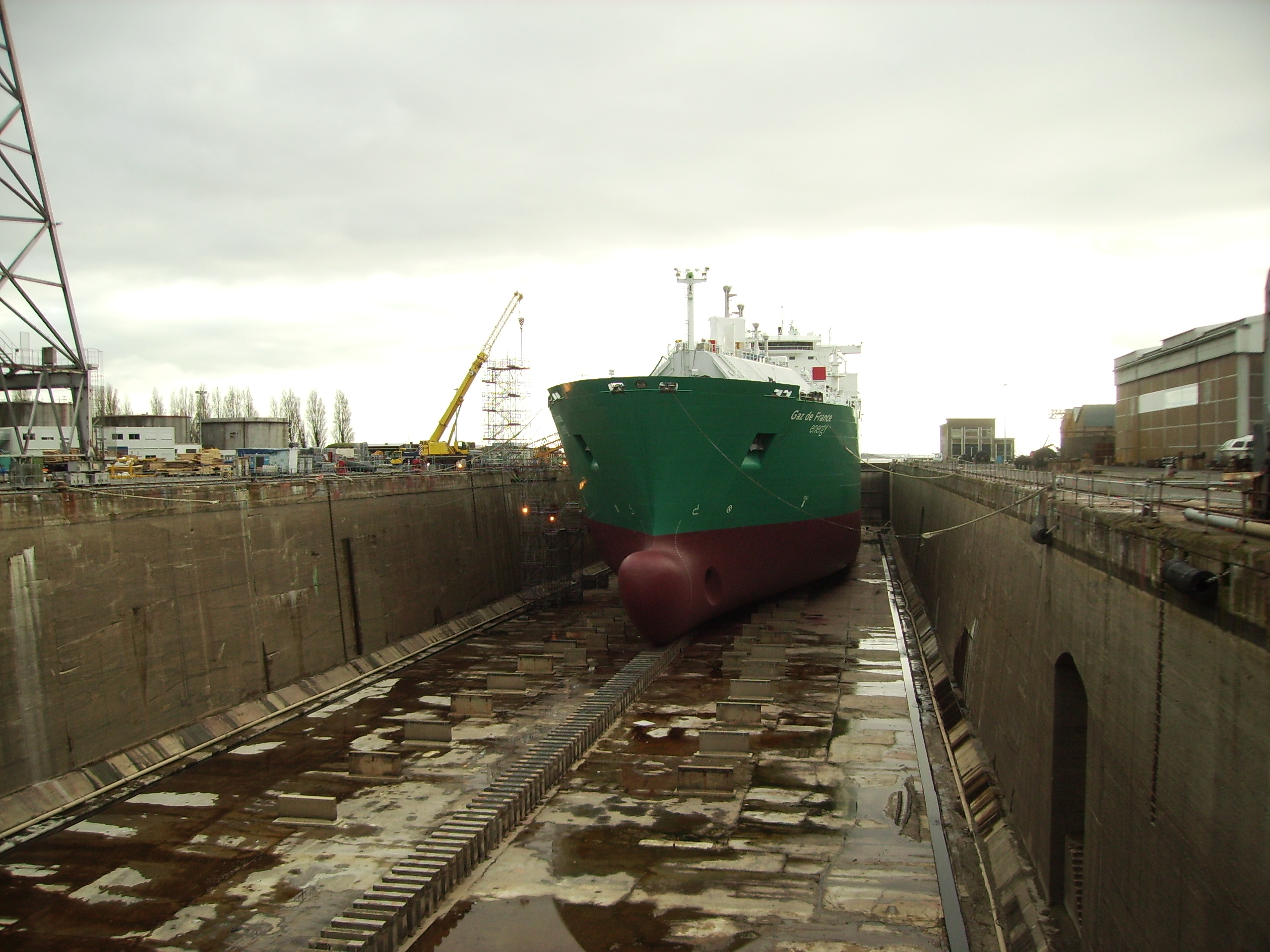
A ship in the Louis Joubert Lock

The Louis Joubert Lock (French: Forme Ecluse Louis Joubert), also known as the Normandie Dock – after the large ocean liner that provided the impetus for the facility to be built, is a lock and major dry dock located in the port of Saint-Nazaire in Loire-Atlantique, northwestern France.

Owned by the Port authority of Nantes-Saint-Nazaire, its strategic importance as a major naval construction and maintenance asset after its completion in 1934 resulted in it becoming the main target of the St. Nazaire Raid; the 1942 British Army Commando raid successfully prevented German battleships, such as Tirpitz, from accessing its maintenance facilities while operating in the Atlantic Ocean.

== Functions ==
The lock has two major functions:

- To give access to the river Loire and hence the Atlantic Ocean for ships of the biggest size from the port of Saint-Nazaire. The port maintains a constant water level and the lock allows this to be maintained while also allowing access to for the largest ships;
- For the maintenance and the construction of large ships the lock can be drained and hence made into a dry dock, making it possible to work on normally submerged or immersed parts of ships.

== History ==
As a historic major seaport on the western edge of the Atlantic, the closest for ships coming from the western Atlantic to France, Saint-Nazaire had played a major part in World War I as a disembarkation point for United States Army troops. The US Army had undertaken various development projects around Saint-Nazaire, including the construction of a refrigeration plant in the docks for storage of imported meat and dairy products.

At the end of the First World War, the Port Authority of Saint-Nazaire envisaged the construction of a third basin to mitigate the port's then lack of large-scale ship facilities. However, due to the post-war recession and resultant downturn in shipping traffic, the idea was abandoned. However, scale problems encountered during the construction of the Île de France and the opportunity to build the proposed super passenger liner which would become the Normandie resulted in a reassessment of the project.

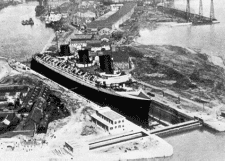
SS Normandie sitting in her namesake dock

Designed and engineered by Albert Caquot, work started in February 1929, and final acceptance took place in 1933. The facility, then the largest dry dock in the world, connected the Penhoet basin with the Loire River. It was named after the former president of the Saint-Nazaire Chamber of Commerce, Louis Joubert, who had died in 1930.

With the fall of France in 1940, the dock took on new strategic importance for the Germans, as it was the only dry dock on the West Coast of France capable of servicing the battleships Bismarck and Tirpitz. The location gave access to the Atlantic Ocean, by-passing the Royal Navy's defensive lines organised along the GIUK gap. Bismarck broke into the Atlantic in 1941 but was damaged in the Battle of the Denmark Strait. She was heading for Saint-Nazaire for repair when she was brought to battle by the Royal Navy and sunk, leaving Tirpitz as the largest surface threat from the Kriegsmarine.

== St Nazaire Raid ==
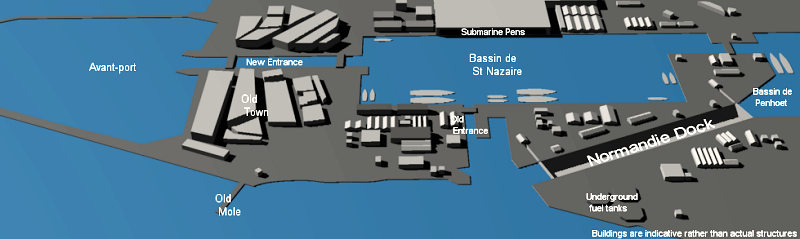
St Nazaire docks in 1942

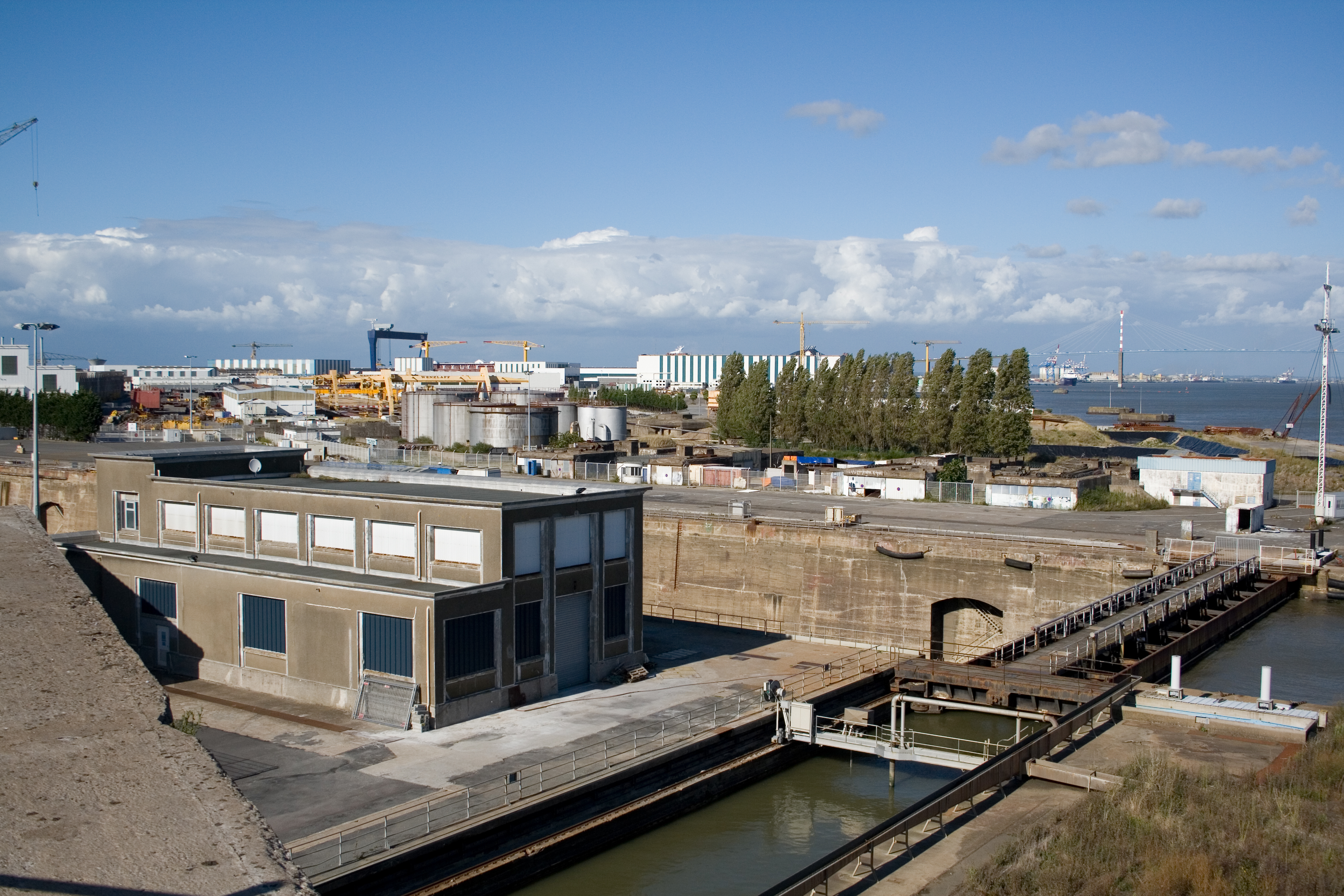
The Loire River side lock gates of the Louis Joubert Lock, the target of the St Nazaire Raid

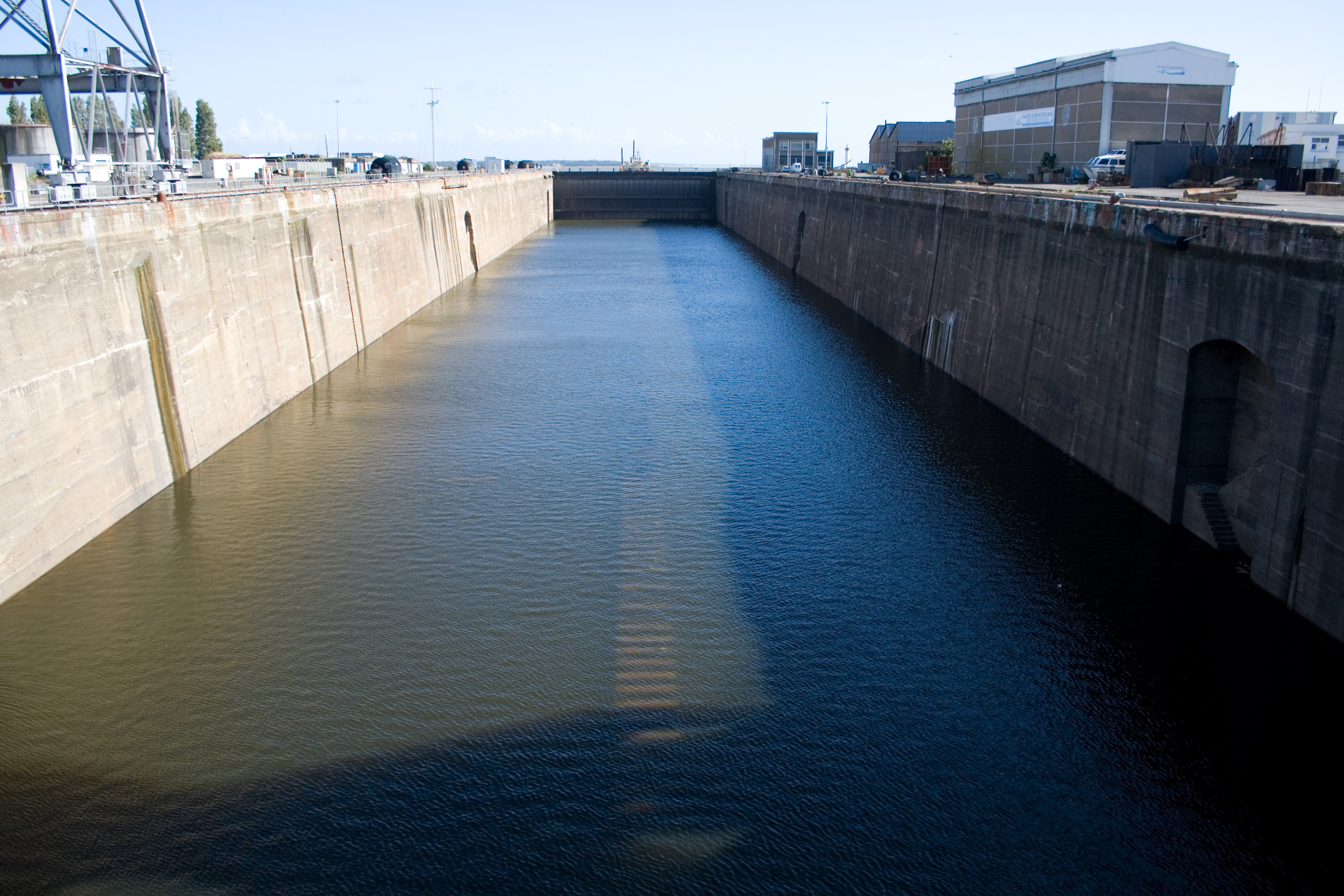
View of the Louis Joubert Lock towards the Loire River

On 27 March 1942, the Joubert Lock was the main target of Operation Chariot. The original strategic purpose of the combined Royal Navy and British Commandos raid was to make the lock – the only location on the Atlantic seaboard capable of servicing the German battleships Bismarck (already sunk in May 1941) and Tirpitz – inoperative. This gave the port a strong strategic importance to the Axis powers, and it was decided that if this drydock could be put out of action, any offensive sortie by the Tirpitz into the Atlantic could be much more dangerous for her and probably not worth the risk.

After Operation Rheinübung on 18–27 May 1941 – in which the Bismarck and the heavy cruiser Prinz Eugen were to have ended their operational raid at Saint-Nazaire, but which resulted in the sinking of HMS Hood and the sinking of the Bismarck – the need for the Allies to take the Joubert lock out of operation was increased.

A force of 611 British Commandos launched the St Nazaire Raid against the shipyards of Saint-Nazaire, codenamed "Operation Chariot". The old British destroyer HMS Campbeltown was used as a ram-ship loaded with explosives against the Loire River estuary gate of the Joubert Lock; its later explosion, combined with commando destruction of the lock's pumping facility and machinery, made it inoperative.

Although the German forces tried to repair the facility, the Joubert Lock remained out of commission for the rest of the war, and it did not function again until 1948; it was not recommissioned until 1950. The first ship to be accommodated after the repairs was the former German ocean liner Europa, which on refit became the SS Liberté, given to France by the United States in compensation for the loss of the Normandie in New York.

== Major dimensions ==
- Length: 350 metres (1,150 ft)
- Width: 50 metres (160 ft)
- Height: 15.25 metres (50.0 ft)
- Lock gates: caisson-and-camber, each 51 metres (167 ft) long and 11 metres (36 ft) thick, constructed of hollow steel sections
- Volume of water: approximately 260,000 cubic metres (340,000 yd^{3})
