= Bill Etches =

- Bill Etches about to eat a Minden Rose, a tradition of the Lancashire Fusiliers.
- Born: 15 May 1921; Bisley, Surrey, England
- Died: 12 April 2015 (aged 93)
- Military career
- Allegiance: United Kingdom
- Branch: British Army
- Service years: 1940–1971
- Rank: Colonel
- Service number: 112866
- Units: Royal Warwickshire Regiment; No. 3 Commando
- Commands: 3rd Battalion, The Queen's Own Nigeria Regiment
- Conflicts: Second World War: Operation Claymore; Operation Archery; St Nazaire Raid; United Nations Operation in the Congo
- Awards: Officer of the Order of the British Empire; Military Cross; Mentioned in dispatches

Colonel William Whitson Etches, OBE, MC (15 May 1921 – 12 April 2015) was a senior British Army officer. After having attended the Royal Military College, Sandhurst, and after being commissioned into the Royal Warwickshire Regiment in December 1939, he served with the commandos during the Second World War, taking part in the raid on St Nazaire for which he won the Military Cross and was taken as a prisoner of war.
