= Encyclopédie de la Pléiade =

The Pléiade encyclopedia (fr:Encyclopédie de la Pléiade) is a collection of Éditions Gallimard, publishing encyclopedic-type scientific texts on major fields of knowledge. It is part of the Bibliothèque de la Pléiade, of which it takes the format and aesthetics of the books, with stars on the back.

The publication extended from 1956 to 1991. The creation of this collection was entrusted to Raymond Queneau. Some of the volumes have been reprinted in the Folio Essais collection.

== List of volumes ==
The Pleiade encyclopedia includes 49 volumes, the information for the first edition of which is detailed in the following table:

Series title	Publication director(s)	Volume title	Year of publication	Number in collection	ISBN
Histoire des Littératures	Raymond Queneau	Tome I : Littératures anciennes, orientales et orales	1956	1	
Histoire des Littératures	Raymond Queneau	Tome II : Littératures occidentales	1956	3	ISBN 9782071000196
Histoire des Littératures	Raymond Queneau	Tome III : Littératures françaises, connexes et marginales	1958	7	ISBN 9782070105946
Histoire universelle	René Grousset, Émile-G. Léonard	Tome I : Des origines à l'Islam	1956	2	ISBN 2070104109
Histoire universelle	René Grousset, Émile-G. Léonard	Tome II : De l'Islam à la Réforme	1957	4	ISBN 2070104117
Histoire universelle	René Grousset, Émile-G. Léonard	Tome III : De la Réforme à nos jours	1958	6	ISBN 2070104125
Histoire de la science	Maurice Daumas	Des origines au XX^{e} siècle	1957	5	ISBN 2070104052
La Terre (réédité sous le titre Géophysique)	Jean Goguel		1959	8	
Histoire de la musique	Roland-Manuel	Tome I : Des origines à Jean-Sébastien Bach	1960	9	ISBN 2070104036
Histoire de la musique	Roland-Manuel	Tome II : Du XVIII^{e} siècle à nos jours	1963	16	ISBN 2070104044
Botanique	Fernand Moreau		1960	10	ISBN 207010396X
L'histoire et ses méthodes	Charles Samaran		1961	11	ISBN 2070104095
Histoire de l'Art	Pierre Devambez	Tome I : Le Monde non-chrétien	1961	12	ISBN 2070103994
Histoire de l'Art	Jean Babelon	Tome II : L'Europe médiévale	1966	21	ISBN 2070104001
Histoire de l'Art	Jean Babelon	Tome III : Renaissance - Baroque - Romantisme	1965	17	ISBN 207010401X
Histoire de l'Art	Bernard Dorival	Tome IV : Du réalisme à nos jours	1969	28	ISBN 2070104028
Astronomie	Evry Schatzman		1962	13	ISBN 2070103951
Zoologie	Pierre-Paul Grassé, Andrée Tétry	Tome I : Généralités - Protozoaires - Métazoaires, I	1963	14	ISBN 2070104206
Zoologie	Pierre-Paul Grassé, Andrée Tétry	Tome II : Les Arthropodes : Métazoaires, II	1964	15	ISBN 2070104214
Zoologie	Pierre-Paul Grassé, Andrée Tétry	Tome III : Métazoaires, III	1972	30	ISBN 2070107736
Zoologie	Pierre-Paul Grassé, Andrée Tétry	Tome IV : Tétrapodes - Domaines faunistiques - Zoogéographie	1974	37	ISBN 2070107965
Biologie	Jean Rostand, Andrée Tétry		1965	18	ISBN 2070103978
Histoire des spectacles	Guy Dumur		1965	19	ISBN 2070104087
Géographie générale	Pierre Deffontaines, Mariel Jean-Brunhes Delamarre, André Journaux		1966	20	ISBN 2070103986
Logique et connaissance scientifique	Jean Piaget		1967	22	ISBN 2070104133
Jeux et sports	Roger Caillois		1968	23	ISBN 2070104257
Ethnologie générale	Jean Poirier		1968	24	ISBN 2070104230
Le language	André Martinet		1968	25	ISBN 2070104249
Histoire de la philosophie	Brice Parain	Tome I : Orient - Antiquité - Moyen Âge	1969	26	ISBN 2070104265
Histoire de la philosophie	Yvon Belaval	Tome II : De la Renaissance à la Révolution kantienne	1973	36	ISBN 2070107604
Histoire de la philosophie	Yvon Belaval	Tome III : du XIX^{e} siècle à nos jours	1974	38	ISBN 2070108252
Physiologie	Maurice Fontaine		1969	27	ISBN 2070104222
Histoire de religions	Henri-Charles Puech	Tome I	1970	29	ISBN 2070104273
Histoire de religions	Henri-Charles Puech	Tome II	1973	34	ISBN 2070107663
Histoire de religions	Henri-Charles Puech	Tome III	1976	40	ISBN 2070107957
Géologie	Jean Goguel	Tome I	1972	31	ISBN 2070107647
Géologie	Jean Goguel	Tome II	1973	35	ISBN 2070107809
La France et les Français	Michel François		1972	32	ISBN 2070107639
Ethnologie régionale	Jean Poirier	Tome I : Afrique - Océanie	1972	33	ISBN 207010771X
Ethnologie régionale	Jean Poirier	Tome II : Asie Amérique Mascareignes	1978	42	ISBN 2070108937
Géographie régionale	Pierre Deffontaines, Mariel Jean-Brunhes Delamare, André Journaux	Tome I	1975	39	ISBN 2070107612
Géographie régionale	Pierre Deffontaines, Mariel Jean-Brunhes Delamare, André Journaux	Tome II	1979	44	ISBN 2070108945
Histoire des techniques	Bertrand Gille	Prolégomènes à une histoire des techniques	1978	41	ISBN 2070108813
Médecine	Pierre de Graciansky, Henri Péquignot	Tome I	1980	45	ISBN 2070109402
Médecine	Pierre de Graciansky, Henri Péquignot	Tome II		43	ISBN 2070109410
Psychologie	Jean-Paul Bronckart, Pierre Mounoud et Jean Piaget		1987	46	ISBN 2070109933
Histoire des mœurs	Jean Poirier	Tome I : Les Coordonnées de l'homme et la culture matérielle	1990	47	ISBN 2070110648
Histoire des mœurs	Jean Poirier	Tome II : Modes et Modèles	1991	48	ISBN 2070112004
Histoire des mœurs	Jean Poirier	Tome III : Thèmes et Systèmes culturels	1991	49	ISBN 2070112012
