= Kingdom of Naples =

State in the Italian peninsula (1282–1816)

Kingdom of Sicily "citra Pharum" (on this side of the lighthouse): Regnum Neapolitanum (Latin); Regno di Napoli (Italian); Regno 'e Napule (Neapolitan)
- 1282–1806 (Note: In 1799, there was a brief interregnum for about 5 months during which the Parthenopean Republic, a French-supported puppet state, operated.); 1815–1816
- Flag under the Aragonese Regime (1442–1516) Coat of arms under the Aragonese Regime
- Motto: Noxias herbas (Latin) (Note: Presumed motto, not official. A legend has it that the motto of the kingdom was Noxias herbas ('noxious herbs'), chosen by Charles I of Anjou in reference to the rake present on the coat of arms, which would have symbolized the expulsion of the Swabian "weed". This hypothesis is rejected by Giovanni Antonio Summonte, who explains that the rake (which is actually a label) indicated that the Angevins were a cadet branch of the Capetians, from whom they inherited the coat of arms with the golden fleurs-de-lis.) Noxious herbs
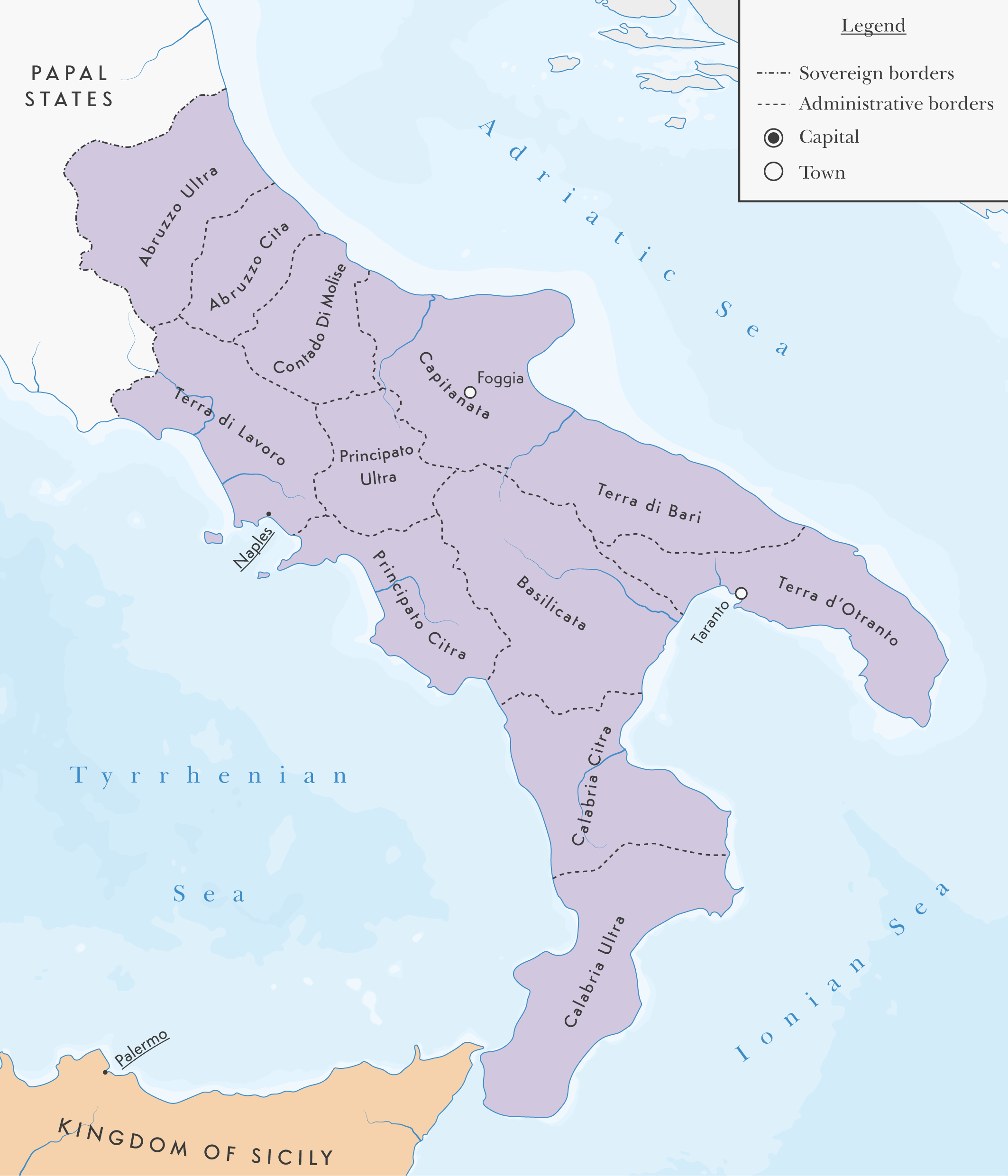
- The territory of the Kingdom of Naples in 1454
- Status: Sovereign state (1282–1442; 1458–1501; 1735–1806; 1815–1816); Part of the Crown of Aragon (1442–1458); Personal union with the Kingdom of France (1501–1504); Viceroyalty of the Spanish Empire (1504–1714); Part of the Habsburg monarchy (1714–1735)
- Capital: Naples
- Official languages: Italian; Latin; Neapolitan
- Religion: Roman Catholicism
- Demonym: Neapolitan
- Government: Absolute monarchy
- King
  - 1282–1285: Charles I (first)
  - 1815–1816: Ferdinand IV (last)
- History
  - Sicilian Vespers: 1282
  - Peace of Caltabellotta: 31 August 1302
  - Neapolitan rebellion: 7 July 1647
  - Treaty of Rastatt: 7 March 1714
  - Battle of Campo Tenese: 10 March 1806
  - Two Sicilies established: 8 December 1816

Population
  - c. 1600: 3,000,000
- Currency: Tarì; Tornesel; Ducat; Neapolitan lira; Cavallo
Preceded by
1282: Kingdom of Sicily
1648: Neapolitan Republic
1799: Parthenopean Republic
1815: French-installed Kingdom of Naples
Succeeded by
1647: Neapolitan Republic
1799: Parthenopean Republic
1806: French-installed Kingdom of Naples
1816: Kingdom of the Two Sicilies
- Today part of: Italy

The Kingdom of Naples, officially the Kingdom of Sicily citra Pharum or "on this side of the lighthouse", was a state that ruled the part of the Italian Peninsula south of the Papal States between 1282 and 1816. It was established by the War of the Sicilian Vespers (1282–1302). Until then, the island of Sicily and southern Italy had constituted the "Kingdom of Sicily". When the island of Sicily revolted and was conquered by the Crown of Aragon, it became a separate kingdom also called the Kingdom of Sicily. This left the Neapolitan mainland in the possession of Charles of Anjou who continued to use the name "Kingdom of Sicily". Later, two competing lines of the Angevin family competed for the Kingdom of Naples in the late 14th century, which resulted in the murder of Joanna I at the hands of her successor, Charles III of Naples. Charles' daughter Joanna II adopted King Alfonso V of Aragon as heir, who would then unite Naples into his Aragonese dominions in 1442.

As part of the Italian Wars, France briefly ruled the territory in 1494 and at the beginning of the 16th century; it then went to war with Spain over the kingdom in 1502, a conflict that ended in a victory for Ferdinand II, who was in full control of the kingdom by 1504. The Spanish held control of Naples throughout the 17th century where it remained an important source of economic and military power for the Spanish Crown. After the War of the Spanish Succession in the early 18th century, the possession of the kingdom again changed hands; the 1714 Treaty of Rastatt saw Naples given to Charles VI of the Austrian Habsburgs. However, Naples and Sicily were conquered by Charles, Duke of Parma (of the Spanish Bourbons) during the War of the Polish Succession in 1734; he was then installed as King of Naples and Sicily from 1735. In 1816, Naples formally unified with the island of Sicily to form the Kingdom of the Two Sicilies.

The Kingdom of Naples was one of the largest and most important Italian states of its era. Its territory corresponded to the current Italian regions of Campania, Calabria, Apulia, Basilicata, Abruzzo, Molise, and also included some areas of today's southern and eastern Lazio.

== Nomenclature ==
The term "Kingdom of Naples" is in near-universal use among historians, but it was not used officially by the government. Since the Angevins remained in power on the Italian peninsula, they kept the original name of the Kingdom of Sicily (Regnum Siciliae). At the end of the War of the Vespers, the Peace of Caltabellotta (1302) provided that the name of the kingdom would be the Kingdom of Sicily Citra Farum. It had become known colloquially as the Kingdom of Naples (Regnum Neapolitanum or Regno di Napoli).

In the late Middle Ages, it was common to distinguish the two Sicilies by noting its location relative to the rest of Italy and the Punta del Faro, i.e., the Strait of Messina. The peninsular kingdom was known as Sicily citra Farum or al di qua del Faro ('on this side of Faro'), and the island kingdom was known as Sicily ultra Farum or di la del Faro (on the other side of Faro). When both kingdoms came under the rule of Alfonso the Magnanimous in 1442, this usage became official, although Ferdinand I (1458–94) preferred the simple title King of Sicily (Rex Sicilie).

In the 18th century the Neapolitan intellectual Giuseppe Maria Galanti argued that Apulia was the true "national" name of the kingdom. By the time of Alfonso the Magnanimous, the two kingdoms were sufficiently distinct that they were no longer seen as divisions of a single kingdom. Despite being repeatedly in personal union, they remained administratively separate. In 1816, the two kingdoms finally merged to form the Kingdom of the Two Sicilies.

== History ==
=== Background ===
Naples, which was the capital of the Duchy of Naples since the 7th century, surrendered to Roger II of Sicily in 1137, and was annexed to the Kingdom of Sicily. The Normans were the first to bring political unity to southern Italy in the centuries after the failure of the Byzantine effort to reconquer Italy. The Normans established a kingdom that included southern mainland Italy and the island of Sicily, which was primarily ruled from Palermo. The title of King of Sicily was established by the Antipope Anacletus II as early as 1130 and subsequently legitimized, in 1139, by Pope Innocent II. Since the royal titles over the State had been assigned to the Normans by Innocent II, the popes, in particular Pope Innocent III and Pope Innocent IV, claimed the feudal rights of the Church State over the Kingdom. After Constance, Queen of Sicily married Henry VI, Holy Roman Emperor, the region was inherited by their son Frederick II, as King of Sicily. The region that later became the separate Kingdom of Naples under the Angevins formed part of the Kingdom of Sicily, which included the island of Sicily and Apulia.

=== Angevin dynasty ===
Following the rebellion in 1282, King Charles I of Sicily (Charles of Anjou) was forced to leave the island of Sicily by Peter III of Aragon's troops. Charles, however, maintained his possessions on the mainland, customarily known as the "Kingdom of Naples", after its capital city.

Charles and his Angevin successors maintained a claim to Sicily, warring against the Aragonese until 1373, when Queen Joan I of Naples formally renounced the claim by the Treaty of Villeneuve. Joan's reign was contested by Louis the Great, the Angevin King of Hungary, who captured the kingdom several times (1348–1352).

Queen Joan I also played a part in the ultimate demise of the first Kingdom of Naples. As she was childless, she adopted Louis I, Duke of Anjou, as her heir, in spite of the claims of her cousin, the Prince of Durazzo, effectively setting up a junior Angevin line in competition with the senior line. This led to Joan I's murder at the hands of the Prince of Durazzo in 1382, and his seizing of the throne as Charles III of Naples.

The two competing Angevin lines contested each other for the possession of the Kingdom of Naples over the following decades. In 1389 Louis II of Anjou son of Louis I managed to seize the throne from Ladislas of Naples son of Charles III, but was expelled by Ladislas in 1399. Charles III's daughter Joanna II (r. 1414–1435) adopted Alfonso V of Aragon (whom she later repudiated) and Louis III of Anjou as heirs alternately, finally settling succession on Louis' brother René of Anjou of the junior Angevin line, and he succeeded her in 1435.

René of Anjou temporarily united the claims of junior and senior Angevin lines.

=== Aragonese dynasty ===
In 1442, Alfonso V conquered the Kingdom of Naples and unified Sicily and Naples once again as dependencies of Aragon. At his death in 1458, the War of the Neapolitan Succession (1458–1462) erupted, after which the kingdom was again separated and Naples was inherited by Ferdinand I, Alfonso's illegitimate son.

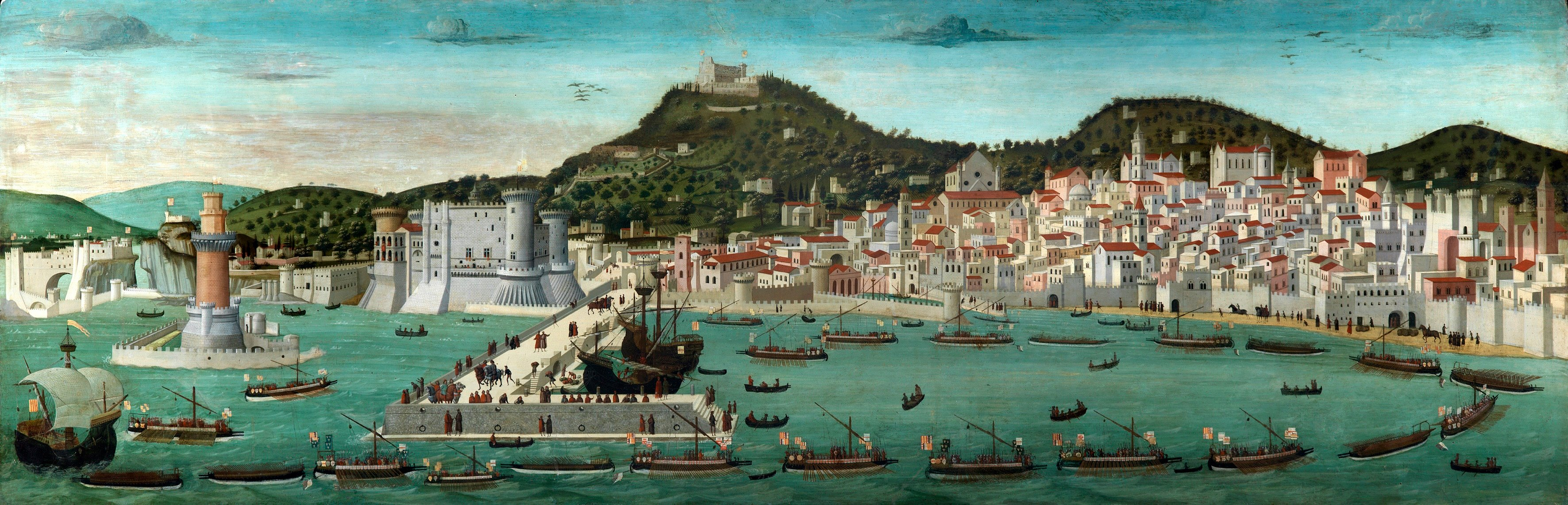
Naples in the 15th century

When Ferdinand I died in 1494, Charles VIII of France invaded Italy, using as a pretext the Angevin claim to the throne of Naples, which his father had inherited in 1481 on the will of Charles IV of Anjou, nephew and heir of King René who had no surviving son. This began the Italian Wars.

==== Charles VIII's invasion ====
Charles VIII expelled Alfonso II of Naples from Naples in 1495, but was soon forced to withdraw due to the support of Ferdinand II of Aragon for his cousin, Alfonso II's son Ferrantino. Ferrantino was restored to the throne but died in 1496 and was succeeded by his uncle, Frederick IV.

Charles VIII's successor, Louis XII reiterated the French claim. In 1501, he occupied Naples and partitioned the kingdom with Ferdinand of Aragon, who abandoned his cousin King Frederick. However, disputes over ownership of key Neapolitan territories made the deal quickly fall through, and Aragon and France resumed their war over the kingdom in 1502. The Spanish troops occupying Calabria and Apulia, led by Gonzalo Fernandez de Cordova, invaded and expelled all Frenchmen from the area. The resulting Aragonese victory left Ferdinand in full control of the kingdom by 1504 and Naples became a constituent kingdom of the Crown of Aragon.

The peace treaties that continued were never definitive, but they established at least that the title of King of Naples was reserved for Ferdinand's grandson, the future Charles V, Holy Roman Emperor. Ferdinand nevertheless continued in possession of the kingdom, being considered the legitimate heir of his uncle Alfonso I of Naples (Alfonso V of Aragon) and also to the former Kingdom of Sicily (Regnum Utriusque Siciliae).

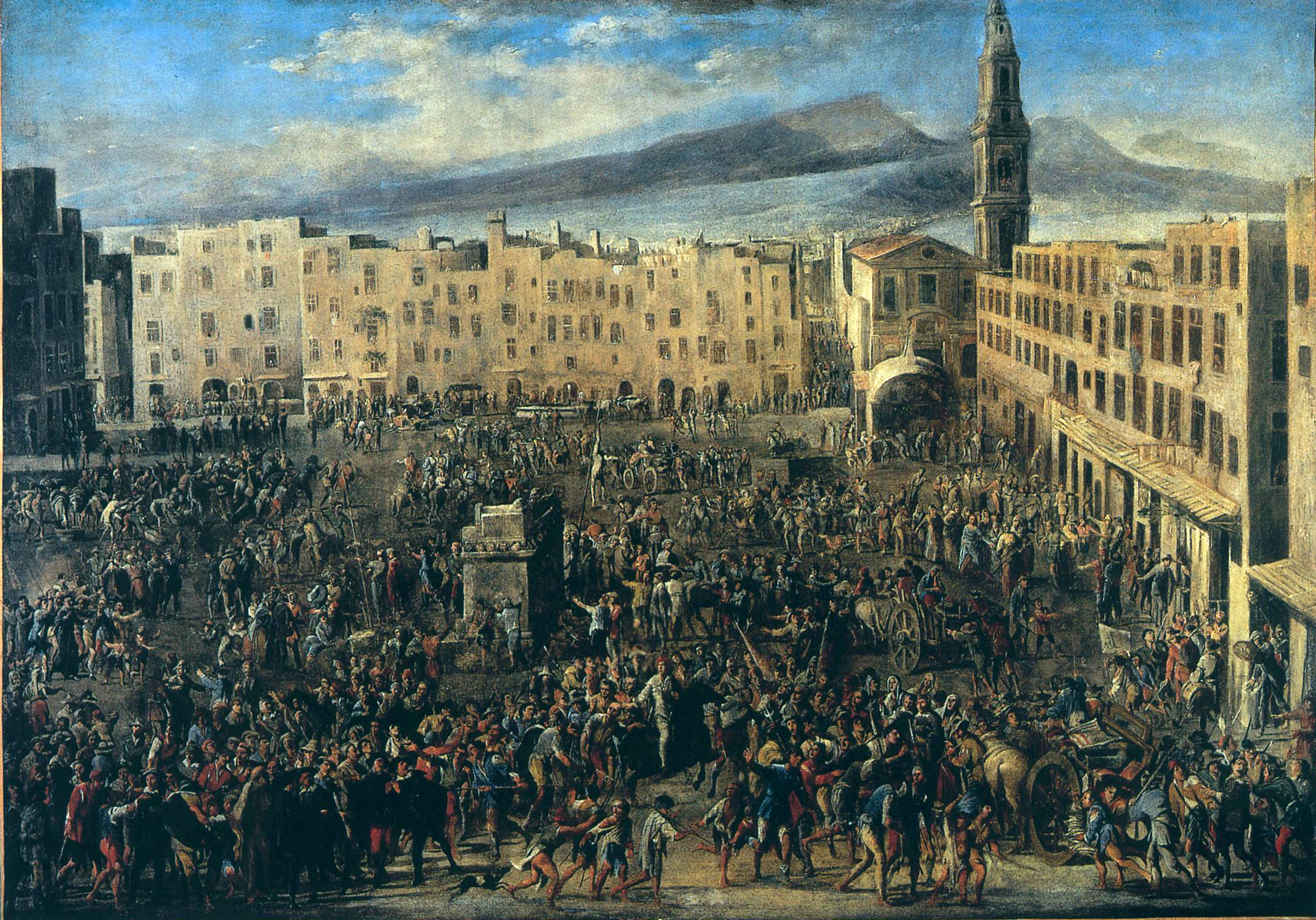
Naples during the revolt of Masaniello in 1647

The kingdom continued to be disputed between France and Spain for the next several decades, but French efforts to gain control of it became feebler as Habsburg power grew, and never genuinely endangered Spanish control.

In 1544, Algerian corsairs sailed into the Bay of Naples and raided it. They then took an estimated 7,000 Neapolitan slaves.

=== Spanish rule ===
The French finally abandoned their claims to Naples by the Treaty of Cateau-Cambrésis in 1559. In the Treaty of London (1557), five cities on the coast of Tuscany were designated the Stato dei Presidi (State of the Presidi), and part of the Kingdom of Naples.

As the most populous holding of the Spanish Empire outside of Castile itself (with 3 million inhabitants in 1600), Naples remained an important source of economic and military power for the Spanish. Heavy taxation was levied upon the kingdom to pay for Spain's wars, especially after 1580. Beyond dispatching troops to fight the Eighty Years' War in the Low Countries, Naples also disbursed a third of the military expenditures accruing to the Spanish controlled Duchy of Milan and paid for the Spanish garrisons in Tuscany. This cost the kingdom 800,000 ducats annually, or about a third of the kingdom's revenues; moreover, the public debt also had a military origin, and interest payments on it devoured 40 percent of all tax income. Naples was rich enough to redeem the debt and pay an attractive ten percent in full to lenders. While the soldiers of Naples were under the command of the Spanish viceroy, Neapolitan nobles enjoyed ascendancy in the assemblies and committees that financed and administered the army.

The kingdom suffered a heavy burden from the Franco-Spanish War (1635–1659). From 1631 to 1636 alone, Naples sent 53,500 soldiers and 3.5 million scudi to support the Spanish king. This was actually more than was raised in the same time by Castile, which had a population twice the size. Naples provided and paid for 10,000 troops and 1,000 horses annually from 1630 to 1643, on top of a 1 million ducat annual subsidy for the war effort and more funds and soldiers for the kingdom's garrisons and navy. The kingdom was increasingly forced to revert to borrowing to finance the war as it went on, which it could do due to its good credit. From 1612 to 1646, Neapolitan taxes tripled and the public debt quintupled, and 57 percent of the kingdom's revenue was devoted to interest payments. Spain's wars crushed the Neapolitan economy. Furthermore, 90 percent of taxes were collected by state creditors, meaning the state paid an effective interest rate of 70 percent annually on the money it borrowed to fight the war. The kingdom started selling state assets to anyone willing to buy them, which usually ended up being barons; these assets included prisons, forests, buildings, and even royal fortresses, and titles.

Due to this excessive taxation the people of Naples rose in revolt in 1647, forming the Neapolitan Republic with French assistance. The revolt was suppressed later that year by Spanish troops.

=== Austrian Habsburgs and Bourbons ===
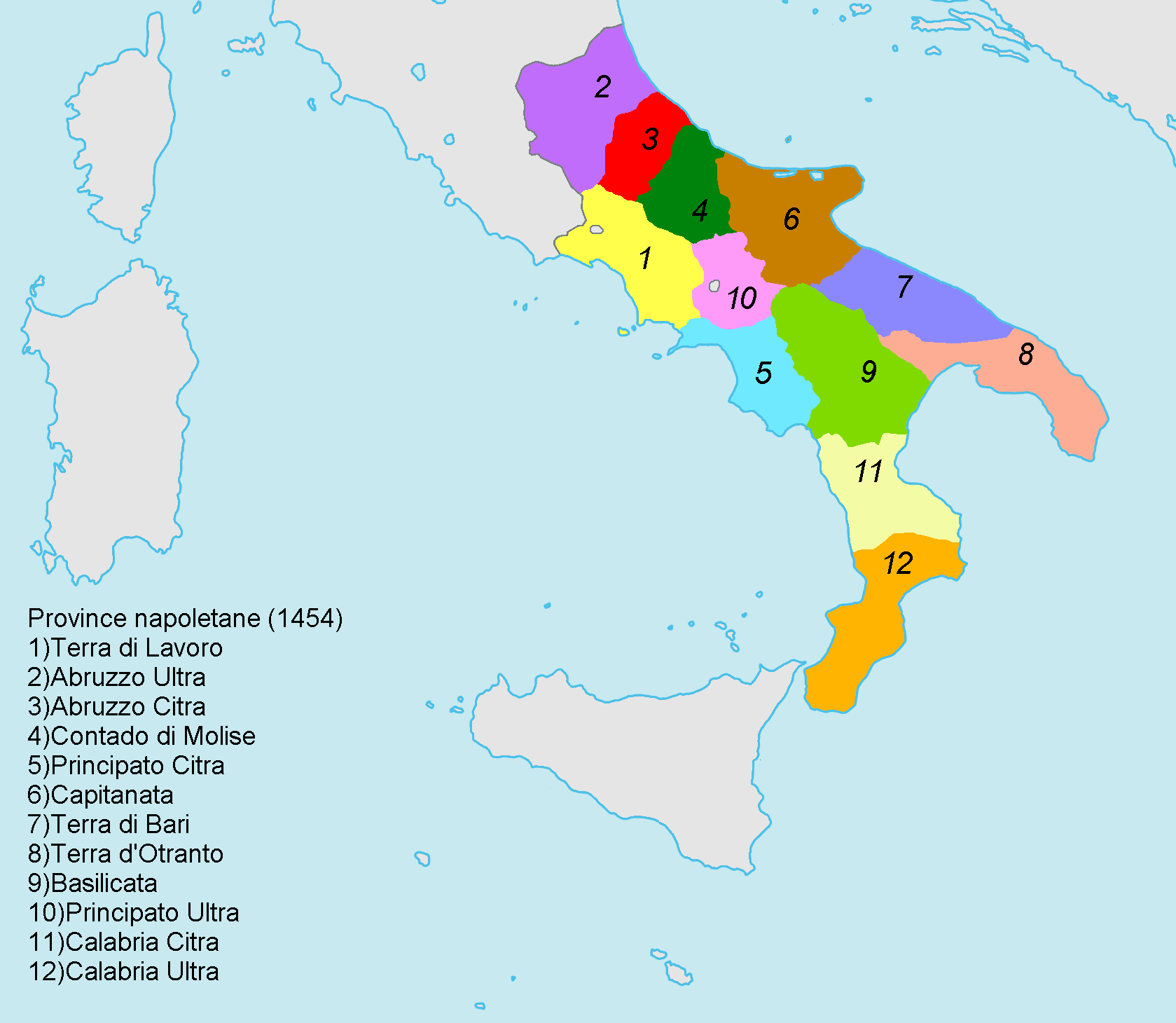
Provinces

After the War of the Spanish Succession in the early 18th century, possession of the kingdom again changed hands. Under the terms of the Treaty of Rastatt in 1714, Naples was given to Charles VI, the Holy Roman Emperor. He also gained control of Sicily in 1720, but Austrian rule did not last long. Both Naples and Sicily were conquered by a Spanish army during the War of the Polish Succession in 1734, and Charles, Duke of Parma, a younger son of King Philip V of Spain, the first member of the French House of Bourbon to rule in Spain, was installed as King of Naples and Sicily from 1735.

When Charles inherited the Spanish throne from his older half-brother in 1759, he left Naples and Sicily to his younger son, Ferdinand IV. Despite the two Kingdoms being in a personal union under the Habsburg and Bourbon dynasties, they remained constitutionally separate. Being a member of the House of Bourbon, Ferdinand IV was a natural opponent of the French Revolution and Napoleon.

On 29 November 1798, Ferdinand IV effectively started the War of the Second Coalition by briefly occupying Rome, but was expelled from it by French Revolutionary forces within the year and safely returned home. Soon afterwards, on 23 December 1798, Ferdinand fled Naples to Palermo as a French army closed in. In January 1799, the French armies installed a Parthenopaean Republic, but this proved short-lived, and a peasant counter-revolution inspired by the clergy allowed Ferdinand to return to his capital. However, in 1801 Ferdinand was compelled to make important concessions to the French by the Treaty of Florence, which reinforced France's position as the dominant power in mainland Italy.

=== Napoleonic kingdom ===
Territorial evolution

Ferdinand's decision to ally with the Third Coalition against Napoleon in 1805 proved more damaging. In 1806, following decisive victories over the allied armies at Austerlitz and over the Neapolitans at Campo Tenese, Napoleon installed his brother, Joseph as King of Naples, he conferred the title "Prince of Naples" to be hereditary on his children and grandchildren. When Joseph was sent off to Spain two years later, he was replaced by Napoleon's sister Caroline and his brother-in-law Marshal Joachim Murat.

Meanwhile, Ferdinand had fled to Sicily, where he retained his throne, despite successive attempts by Murat to invade the island. The British would defend Sicily for the remainder of the war but despite the Kingdom of Sicily nominally being part of the Fourth, Fifth, and Sixth Coalitions against Napoleon, Ferdinand and the British were unable to ever challenge French control of the Italian mainland.

After Napoleon's defeat in 1814, Murat reached an agreement with Austria and was allowed to retain the throne of Naples, despite the lobbying efforts of Ferdinand and his supporters. However, with most of the other powers, particularly Britain, hostile towards him and dependent on the uncertain support of Austria, Murat's position became less and less secure. Therefore, when Napoleon returned to France for the Hundred Days in 1815, Murat once again sided with him. Realising the Austrians would soon attempt to remove him, Murat gave the Rimini Proclamation hoping to save his kingdom by allying himself with Italian nationalists.

The ensuing Neapolitan War between Murat and the Austrians was short, ending with a decisive victory for the Austrian forces at the Battle of Tolentino. Murat was forced to flee, and Ferdinand IV was restored to the throne of Naples. Murat would attempt to regain his throne but was quickly captured and executed by firing squad in Pizzo, Calabria. The next year, 1816, finally saw the formal union of the Kingdom of Naples with the Kingdom of Sicily into the new Kingdom of the Two Sicilies.

== Demographics ==
=== Languages ===
The languages of the Kingdom of Naples reflect the rich cultural and historical diversity of this southern Italian state. The official language was Italian, used for bureaucracy, education, and formal communications. However, the languages spoken daily by the population were varied. In the mainland territories, such as Campania and Calabria, the Neapolitan and Calabrian dialects predominated, which are part of the group of intermediate southern languages.

In Sicily, the main language spoken was Sicilian, a language with its own history and literature. Furthermore, in the various territories of the kingdom, there were linguistic minorities, such as the Greek speakers in Calabria and Puglia, and the Albanian speakers in Sicily and Calabria, who spoke Greek and Albanian respectively. This linguistic plurality was a reflection of the history of colonization and domination of different cultures that characterized the Kingdom of the Two Sicilies.

As often happens, the evolution of the various dialects of the kingdom is not easily traceable, since the dialects were practically never transcribed and Latin and Italian language were used for written communication. In the kingdom, written communication was itself very rare considering the high rate of illiteracy. Nevertheless, traces of dialects are sometimes found in some expressions used by educated people, for example in correspondence; also some methodologies such as comparative linguistics enables to trace some features of the evolution of dialects.

One of the few testimonies relating to the language in use in the Middle Ages in the Kingdom of Naples is that of Salimbene de Adam (13th century AD) who, in his Chronicle, notes the total absence of the use of courtesy pronouns in the languages of the Apulians and Sicilians who, according to what the author reports, the courtesy pronouns were almost absent and they would use the tu ("you") even to refer to the emperor while, on the contrary, the Lombards would use the pronoun voi (courtesy pronoun) even for referring to a child. These regional differences also occur in contemporary Italian.

=== Religions ===
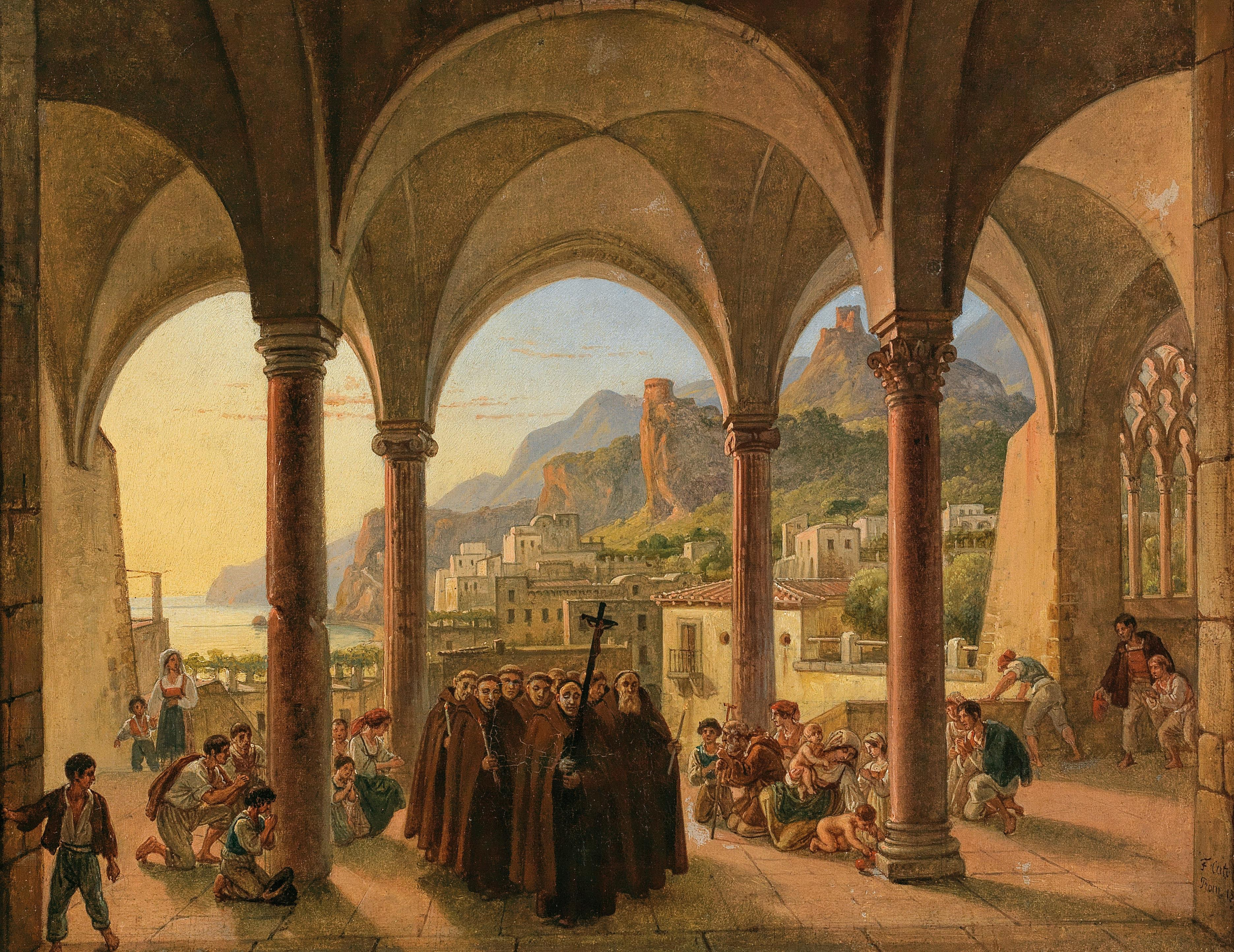
View of Amalfi from the porch of the cathedral

Religions in the Kingdom of Naples and, later, the Kingdom of the Two Sicilies were mainly Roman Catholicism, which was the state religion and deeply intertwined with the political, social and cultural life of the kingdom. The Catholic Church had a strong influence and ran many educational and charitable institutions. Despite the predominance of Catholicism, other religious communities were also present and small Jewish communities lived mainly in the major cities such as Naples and Palermo, where they enjoyed relative tolerance and actively participated in economic life. In addition, there were minorities of Greek-Catholic rite, especially in Calabria and Sicily, due to the historical Byzantine presence and the immigration of Albanian communities. These communities maintained their religious and cultural traditions, while remaining in communion with the Church of Rome.

Much more varied, however, was the amount of religions in the Kingdom of Naples during the Middle Ages. Most of the cities and towns had Jewish as well as Muslim communities (the so-called i mori); those communities significantly decreased in the following centuries. In particular, the Jewish communities were significantly reduced after the expulsion edicts issued during the 16th century by Ferdinand the Catholic (1510) and other kings. With the edict of expulsion of Charles V of Habsburg (1541), Jews and new converts became mostly insignificant in the Kingdom of Naples.

=== Customs and traditions ===
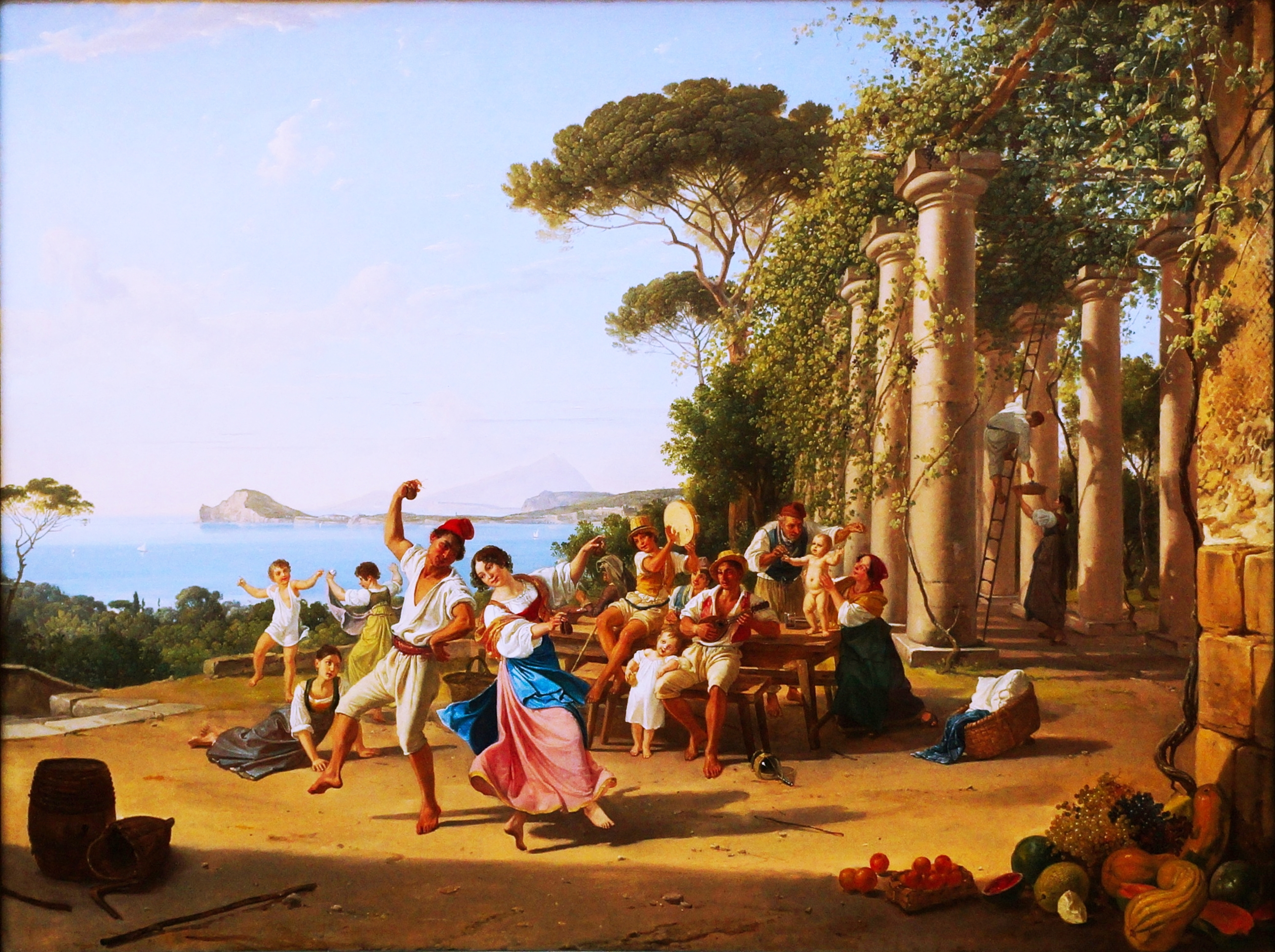
Festival near Pozzuoli, by Franz Ludwig Catel

The Neapolitan Republic of 1647 greatly influenced subsequent historical development of revolutions in Europe over the 17th century and 18th century, and it even inspired the French Revolution of 1789. It is noteworthy what was then reported by travellers (British for the most part) in the 18th century and 19th century inside Naples; they reported, in the daguerreotypes and in the pictorial representations of their travels, that spaghetti were eaten using bare hands in the streets of Naples. This tradition soon became a proper tourist attraction, so that tourists gave small change to the lazzaroni who then rushed to buy spaghetti and then eat them with their own hands.

This custom was preserved well beyond the period of existence of the Kingdom of Naples and until very recent times; it was also the subject of popular scenes in a few films of the 20th century and, in particular, in the movie Poverty and Nobility (1954) starring the Italian actor Totò. Other distinctive characteristics of the inhabitants of the kingdom were the low level of literacy and widespread selfishness. In this context, there were regions such as Calabria whose inhabitants were referred to by Europeans as the last "European savages".

For a few centuries, Naples has often been described as "a paradise inhabited by devils" (in Italian: un paradiso abitato da diavoli). Italian historian Benedetto Croce, in one of his essays, traced the origin of this saying and he discovered its first occurrence in a letter written in 1539 by Bernardino Daniello and sent to Alessandro Corvino. In 1592, it occurred for the first time outside the Italian peninsula in a letter by Sir Henry Wotton. As pointed out by Benedetto Croce, this saying was used over the centuries to denote different things, i.e. in some cases Naples was described as a city of sin and vices, most notably prostitution. In other cases, it was used to denote the rudeness, mischievousness and lack of intelligence of its population (for example, some statements of the book Le facezie del Pievano Arlotto on Piovano Arlotto) – 14th century). Neapolitans were also described as extremely jealous and "tyrants of women". In 1707, the German author Johann Andreas Bühel published a whole essay on this saying, i.e. Regnum Neapolitanum Paradisus Est, Sed A Diabolis Habitatus.

== Scientists and philosophers of the Kingdom of Naples ==
- Trotula (11th–12th century), early representative and pioneer of women's medicine
- Trota of Salerno (12th–13th century), doctor
- Barlaam of Seminara (1290–1348), mathematician and philosopher
- Pietro Ranzano (1428–1492), Italian humanist, Dominican friar, bishop of Lucera, historian
- Luca Gaurico (1475–1558), astronomer and mathematician
- Bartolomeo Maranta (1500–1571), physician and botanist
- Giovanni Filippo Ingrassia (1510–1580), the anatomist
- Aloysius Lilius (1510–1576), mathematician and astronomer, principal creator of the Gregorian calendar
- Giambattista della Porta (1535–1615), Renaissance sage, physician and botanist, author of Magia Naturalis
- Giordano Bruno (1548–1600), astronomer and philosopher, advocate of the Copernican model and tried for heresy
- Fabio Colonna (1567–1640), botanist
- Marco Aurelio Severino (1580–1656), surgeon and anatomist; first to include drawings of pathological lesions in his books.
- Giovanni Battista Zupi (1590–1650), astronomer, first to observe the phases of Mercury
- Giovanni Battista Hodierna (1597–1660), astronomer
- Giovanni Alfonso Borelli (1608–1679), physicist and mathematician who contributed to the principle of modern scientific inquiry by continuing Galileo's practice of testing hypotheses against observation. Having studied mathematics, Borelli also did extensive work on the moons of Jupiter, the mechanics of animal movements, and microscopically on the components of blood. He also used microscopy to investigate the stoma movement of plants and conducted studies in the field of medicine and geology.
- Agostino Scilla (1629–1700), the archaeologist who initiated the modern scientific study of fossils
- Leonardo Ximenes (1716–1786), mathematician, astronomer, physicist, geographer, engineer
- Domenico Cotugno (1736–1822), physician, first to provide the definitions of cerebrospinal fluid (CSF) and sciatica.
- Tiberius Cavallo (1749–1809), physicist, natural philosopher, inventor, scientist conducting electrical experiments
- Giuseppe Saverio Poli (1746–1825), physicist, biology, natural historian
- Giuseppe Maria Giovene (1753–1837), naturalist, agronomist, geologist, meteorologist, entomologist
- Luca de Samuele Cagnazzi (1764–1852), scientist and political economist
- Nicola Onorati (1764–1822), Italian agronomist and naturalist
- Annibale Giordano (1769–1835), mathematician and revolutionary
- Annibale de Gasparis (1819–1892), astronomer known for his discovery of asteroids and his contributions to theoretical astronomy.
- Vincenzo Cerulli (1859–1927), astronomer especially known for his work on Mars and Venus and his discovery of the minor planet 704 Interamnia.

== Flags ==
1282–1442
Angevin flag of Naples

1442–1516
Flag changed after Alfonso I of the House of Trastámara became King.

The kingdom adopted the flag of the Spanish Empire when the Habsburg Charles V became King of Naples in 1516.

1714–1734
Flag changed after Charles VI became King.

1735–1806; 1815–1816
Flag changed after Charles VII became King of Naples. Flag was reinstated as the flag of Naples after the Napoleonic Wars.

1806–1808
Flag of Naples changed after Joseph Bonaparte became king.

1808–1811
Flag of Naples changed after Joachim Murat became king.

1811–1815
Flag of Naples changed

== See also ==
- History of Naples
- List of monarchs of Naples
- Principato Ultra

== Bibliography ==
- AA. VV. (1582), Dionigi Atanagi (ed.), Delle lettere facete et piacevoli di diversi grandi huomini et chiari ingegni, scritte sopra diverse materie (in Italian), vol. 1, Venice, pp. 203–204
- Henry Wotton (1592), Life and Letters, Oxford
- Johann Andreas Bühel (1707), Regnum Neapolitanum Paradisus Est, Sed A Diabolis Habitatus
- Colletta, Pietro (1858), History of the Kingdom of Naples, 1734–1825 (with a supplementary chapter 1825–1856), translated by Susan Horner, Edinburgh: T. Constable: vol. 1, vol. 2 (reprinted in one volume with a new introduction by John Davis as The History of the Kingdom of Naples: From the Accession of Charles of Bourbon to the Death of Ferdinand I, London: Tauris, 2009)
- Duret de Tavel (1820), Séjour d'un officier francais en Calabre, Paris: Che Béchet
- The Popular Encyclopedia, vol. 1, Glasgow: Blackie And Son, 1846, p. 798
- Fra Salimbene de Adam (1882), Cronaca di Fra Salimbene Parmigiano volgarizzata da Carlo Cantarelli, vol. 1, Parma: Luigi Battei Editore
- Fra Salimbene de Adam (1882), Cronaca di Fra Salimbene Parmigiano volgarizzata da Carlo Cantarelli, vol. 2, Parma: Luigi Battei Editore
- Benedetto Croce (2006), Un paradiso abitato da diavoli (in Italian), Milan: Adelphi Edizioni S.p.A., ISBN 978-88-459-2036-3
- Léonard, Émile-Guillaume (1954), Les Angevins de Naples, Paris: Presses universitaires de France
- Croce, Benedetto (1970), H. Stuart Hughes (ed.), History of the Kingdom of Naples, translated by Frances Frenaye, Chicago: University of Chicago Press (English translation of the revised 3rd edn. (1953) of Storia del regno di Napoli, 1st edn. Bari: Laterza, 1925)
- Mozzillo, Attanasio (1972), Croncache della Calabria in guerra, Naples: Edizioni Scientifiche Italiane
- Ryder, Alan (1976), The Kingdom of Naples under Alfonso the Magnanimous: The Making of a Modern State, Oxford: Oxford University Press, ISBN 978-0198225355
- Labrot, Gérard (1979), Baroni in città. Residenze e comportamenti dell'aristocrazia napoletana, 1530–1734, Naples: Società editrice napoletana [ISBN unspecified]
- Delille, Gérard (1985), Famille et propriété dans le royaume de Naples (XVe–XIXe siècles), Rome: École française de Rome, ISBN 978-2728300792
- Galasso, Giuseppe; Romeo, Rosario, eds. (1986–1991), Storia del Mezzogiorno, vol. 1–15, Napoli: Edizioni del Sole
- Marino, John A. (1988), Pastoral Economics in the Kingdom of Naples, Baltimore: Johns Hopkins University Press, ISBN 978-0801834370
- Galasso, Giuseppe, ed. (1992–2011), Il regno di Napoli, Storia d'Italia, 15, vol. 1–6, Torino: UTET, ISBN 8802044996
- Labrot, Gérard (1995), Quand l'histoire murmure. Villages et campagnes du Royaume de Naples (XVIe–XVIIIe siècle), Rome: École française de Rome, ISBN 978-2728303274
- Dunbabin, Jean (1998), Charles I of Anjou: Power, Kingship and State-Making in Thirteenth-Century Europe, London: Routledge, ISBN 978-0582253704
- Kiesewetter, Andreas (1999), Die Anfänge der Regierung König Karls II. von Anjou (1278–1295). Das Königreich Neapel, die Grafschaft Provence und der Mittelmeerraum zu Ausgang des 13. Jahrhunderts, Husum: Matthiesen, ISBN 3786814511
- Porter, Jeanne Chenault (2000), Baroque Naples: A Documentary History 1600–1800, New York: Italica, ISBN 978-0934977524, OCLC 43167960
- Santore, John (2001), Modern Naples: A Documentary History 1799–1999, New York: Italica, ISBN 978-0934977531, OCLC 45087196
- Pollastri, Sylvie (2011), Le lignage et le fief. L'affirmation du milieu comtal et la construction des états féodaux sous les Angevins de Naples (1265–1435), Paris: Publibook, ISBN 978-2748367409
- Sakellariou, Eleni (2012), Southern Italy in the Late Middle Ages: Demographic, Institutional, and Economic Change in the Kingdom of Naples, c. 1440–c. 1530, Leiden: Brill, ISBN 978-90-04-22406-3
- Musto, Ronald G. (2013), Medieval Naples: A Documentary History 400–1400, New York: Italica, ISBN 978-1599102474, OCLC 810773043
