= Raymond Delamarre =

French sculptor

Raymond Delamarre (1890–1986) was a French sculptor and medalist. He played a major role in the Art Déco movement. While his ecclesiastical work showed the influence of Catholicism, he was personally agnostic. His art, especially his war memorials, was also influenced by his firsthand experiences of the horrors of the First World War.

== Biography ==
When aged sixteen years, Delamarre joined the École des Beaux-Arts in Paris and was attached to the studio of Jules-Félix Coutan. His studies were interrupted, firstly by his conscription into the army from 1911 to 1913 and then service from 1914 to 1918 after the French mobilization, although between the two he managed some further time back in Coutan's studio. Soon after mobilization Delamarre was sent to the front and was almost immediately taken prisoner. He was released in the course of an exchange of prisoners carried out in 1916 and returned to active service.

On leaving the army at the end of the war, Delamarre now tried to secure the "Prix de Rome" and with the bas-relief "Le retour du guerrier au foyer familial" he shared the prize with Alfred Janniot which meant he was able to spend four years in Rome at the Villa Médicis. He was to stay in Rome until 1924, grew a moustache and visited and studied the sculpture of Greece. The composition "Suzanne au bain" exhibited in 1922 at the Salon des Artistes Français is a good illustration of Delamarre's work at this time.

In 1925 and in collaboration with the architect Michel Roux Spitz, he took part in the competition to secure the work on the proposed "Monument à la Défense du canal de Suez" to be erected in Ismaîlia, a work of huge proportions and a most prestigious project. Also working with Roux-Spitz, he exhibited a sculptural composition for a water fountain at the Exposition des Arts Décoratifs in Paris, the bas-reliefs "Nessus et Dejanire" and "Persée et Andromède" cast in bronze in 1935, two tympani for the decorator Paul Follot, a bronze entitled "David" and a work in plaster entitled "Femme au bélier". Between 1926 and 1927, Delamarre worked on the "Mowgli" ronde-bosse. He also executed a bas-relief of Mowgli in plaster measuring 2 metres by 2 metres.

In 1927, Delamarre married Mariel Jean-Brunhes, the daughter of the geographer Jean Brunhes and they made visits to Spain and the Balearics. In 1928, he produced the group "Adam et Eve" or "La tentation" in bronze, which composition was to appear subsequently in various limited editions, in both bronze and plaster. In 1931, he participated in the Exposition Coloniale de Paris, creating the figure of Christ carved from acajou wood from Cuba and eight Beatitudes. 1935 saw completion of his work for the ocean liner "Normandie" and 1937 he completed his great work in bronze for the Palais de Chaillot with three 4-metre-high figures being created symbolizing Philosophy, the Visual Arts and the Arts. These figures were erected after the 1939–40 war. These three figures were to reappear in a number of limited editions in both plaster and bronze and in a variety of sizes. From 1961 to 1973, he managed the business of the "Art Sacré" studios in Paris' place de Furstenberg, working with Maurice Denis and Georges Desvallières.

In 1963 Delamarre created the last of his great "monumental" works, executing 12 reliefs in stone for the entrance of the chapel of Nantes's new hospital, a building designed by Michel Roux Spitz, after which he worked on a number of busts, statues, medals and plaque until his death on 28 February 1986. His output both in medals and sculptures was huge. This article will concentrate on sculpture although a second article, just on Delamarre's medals would be both justified and welcome.

== Decorations ==
- Chevalier of the Legion of Honour (1936)

== Prix de Rome winning entry "La Gloire ramène le Héros au foyer familial" ==
This bas-relief in plaster was the work which won Delamarre the Prix de Rome in 1919. It is held by the École nationale supérieure des Beaux-Arts in Paris amongst their collection of former pupils work. Because of the 1914–18 war, the Prix de Rome prizes awarded in 1919 were shared, Delamarre sharing his prize with Alfred Janniot

== Works executed whilst studying in Rome at the Villa Médicis and sent to Paris. 1920–24 ==
Whilst in Rome Delamarre executed several works including those listed below.

=== The sculpture entitled "Suzanne" ===
This was the first work sent to Paris by Delamarre from Rome. When the Villa Médicis reopened after the war their finances were in a poor state and in 1920 they were not able to organize the traditional exhibition, which showed works completed by students and deemed suitable to be sent to Paris. That academic year, Delamarre had prepared a female nude study in plaster but this was not shown until an exhibition was organized in Rome for the year 1921, by which time the Villa had started to get back to normal. It was then shown in Paris in the September of that year. In 1926 a Carrara marble version was accepted by the Petit Palais des Champs-Elysées. In 1960 it was moved to the Musée d’art moderne in Paris.

=== Victory monument- "monument à la Victoire" ===
A work with Roux-Spitz carried out in 1921/1922 and of huge proportions being 30 metres high. Its size in fact presented problems to the administrators of Villa Médicis and there were logistical problems in carrying it by train to Paris. The whereabouts of the work is not currently known but there is at least a photograph in circulation of Delamarre's maquette. The work won Michel Roux-Spitz the 1920 Prix de Rome for architecture.

=== 4th Station of the Cross ===
This was Delamarre's third despatch of a work from Rome to Paris and involved a composition for the 4th station of the Stations of the Cross ("chemin de croix") that showing Jesus meeting His Mother. The composition was shown in Rome on 22 June 1923 and sent to Paris on 21 August 1923 and shown at that autumn's Paris Salon exhibition in the section dedicated to "Art religieux".

=== A study of "David" ===
A copy of this Delamarre work stands in Charleville-Mézières's Stade du "Petit Bois". This final Rome linked composition is dated to 1923/1924 when Delamarre was finishing his time at Villa Medicis. The work is known as "Jeune Frondeur" or simply "David". The piece was first executed in plaster and shown at Rome's annual exhibition on 21 May 1924 and then sent to Paris to be finally shown at the Salon des artistes français in 1925, but by this time in bronze with a gold patina. It was purchased by the French state who placed it in the Charleville-Mézières hôtel de ville before it was moved to the “Petit Bois” in 1929. A limited edition was subsequently produced by the Fonderie d'Art de Coubertin, the composition being reduced in size from 2.10 metres to 0.60 centimetres. Fonderie d'Art de Coubertin also produced a bronze of David's head alone, the "Tête de David", this based on an original work in plaster taken from Delamarre's studio.

== Reliefs ==
Several architects commissioned Delamarre to create reliefs for buildings they were designing. Some of these are listed below.

=== Relief on the façade of Grand-Couronne's mairie ===
Delamarre executed this large bas-relief between 1954 and 1955. The composition included both depictions of the port of Rouen and reminders of the Vikings and William the Conqueror. The Delamarre family made a gift to the Musée Elbeuf of various artifacts which are held in the museum's "Fabrique des savoirs" including Delamarre's studies for the Grand-Couronne work.

=== Bas-relief for Paris' 14th arrondissement mairie ===
In 1934 Delamarre participated in the decoration of the annex built for the mairie of Paris' 14th arrondissement and executed several reliefs. One relief was entitled "La Pensée" and had been shown at the 1934 "Salon des artistes décorateurs". Another of the reliefs is entitled "L'Action". In 2011, the street changed its name to Rue Pierre-Castagnou.

=== The 1956 relief in the Archives départementales du Cantal in Aurillac ===
Delamarre completed a relief for the entrance to the Cantal archive's premises in 1956. The relief depicted the history of archives from the Middle Ages to the "Empire".

=== The bas-relief "La Justice" ===
This bas-relief in stone was created in 1946 for the Ministry of Justice building in Paris' rue Cambon, a building designed by the architect Paul Tournon.

=== The 1954 relief on Louviers' Hôtel de Poste ===
The post office building was rebuilt after the war to the design of the architect Pierre Chirol and Delamarre was commissioned to create a 13-metre-high relief. The relief was entitled "Iris la Messagère". In Greek mythology, Iris is the personification of the rainbow and messenger of the gods. In Delamarre's composition, Iris is shown with three carrier pigeons. She is writing a letter.

=== "La Famille"-a bas-relief at 34 rue Chomel ===
The architect Emile Boursier commissioned Delamarre to execute a relief for this art déco style building in Paris' rue Chomel, which contained the offices of the Compagnie anonyme française d’assurances who traded under the name ‘La Populaire". The composition "La Famille" was the result with a proud father holding up a winged baby and showing it to the mother with a young girl looking on. A scene of family bliss.

=== "Pour que l’homme ne soit pas victime des forces qu’il a déchaînées" Brest Lycée de Kerichen ===
This work was intended for Brest's Lycée de Kérichen designed by Jean-Baptiste Mathon. It was in 1962 that Mathon commissioned Delamarre to create sculptural decoration for the "Centre des Chèques Postaux" in Dijon and the Brest Lycée de Kerichen. Delamarre's composition "Pour que l’homme ne soit pas victime des forces qu’il a déchaînées" is based on the story of Prometheus. The Lycée de Kerichen moved Delamarre's work in a major renovation of the school and the work's present whereabouts are not known.

=== Three reliefs for the Salon des artistes décorateurs ===
In 1926 and working with Roux-Spitz, Delamarre created three reliefs for a display in the 1926 Salon. They were entitled "Intelligence", "Mouvement" and "Harmonie". The present whereabouts of these reliefs is not known and it is possible they were destroyed when the display was dismantled.

=== "Aviation". A bas-relief for the Air Ministry ===
This work had been shown at the 1926 Salon des artistes décorateurs and was erected in the Air Ministry in 1930. A medal with the same composition was struck by the Monnaie de Paris and both the medal and the bas-relief carried the words "AD EXCELSA PER EXCELSUM". The present whereabouts of this work is unknown.

=== Relief in the roserie of the Château de Bourbon-Conti ===
This relief can be seen near a fountain in the château's gardens.

== Works linked to International Trade Fairs ==
The major international fairs of 1925, 1931, 1935 and 1937 gave opportunities for Delamarre to show his work to a wider audience.

=== The 1925 International Exhibition of "arts décoratifs et industriels modernes" ===
The "Exposition internationale des arts décoratifs et industriels modernes" (International Exposition of Modern Industrial and Decorative Arts) was a World's fair held in Paris, France, from April to October 1925. This exhibition was to play a crucial role in the development of Art Déco, indeed the term "Art Déco" was derived by shortening the words Arts Décoratifs, in the exhibition title. The exhibition brought together many ideas of the international avant-garde in the fields of architecture and applied arts. The exhibition took place between the esplanade of Les Invalides and the entrances of the Grand Palais and Petit Palais. It received 4,000 guests at the inauguration on April 28, and thousands of visitors on each of the following days. The pavilion called the "Ambassade française" was one of the exhibitions main attractions. It was an imaginary French embassy, whose various rooms were decorated by a team of artists, mostly members of the société des artistes décorateurs, thus creating a virtual showcase for “French taste”, for France's arts and crafts, her designers, artists, furniture makers, potters, craftsmen and craftswomen and sculptors. The building contained many rooms and many had specific themes. There was a room for "Madame", another for "Monsieur", an antechamber, a boudoir, a study, a library, a smoking room and three music rooms, four halls and an art gallery. Delamarre created two large reliefs for the Roux-Spitz "Hall de Collection" or museum room, entitled "Persée et Andromède" and "‘Nessus et Déjanire" and two tympani for Follot's "Antichambre" entitled "Pastorale" and "Courtisane". Delamarre also executed reliefs on the faces of a Roux-Spitz designed fountain in one of the exhibition's gardens, that designed by the landscape gardener Joseph Marrast in the avenue Cours-La-Reine.

=== "Exposition coloniale" of 1931 ===
The idea of such an exhibition was first muted in 1916 and was considered on many subsequent occasions until 1931 when it seemed necessary to stress the benefits of empire to the French population. The exhibition was mounted on a site in the Bois de Vincennes. It was decided to erect a pavilion as part of the exhibition to showcase the work of catholic missionaries and the architect Paul Tournon was chosen to design it. He chose to design a wooden replica of a church which would incorporate architectural styles from all the regions where French catholic missionaries were at work and Tournon's chapel had the look of a pagoda, his bell-tower was reminiscent of the mosques of Black Africa and its annexes were covered in the green tuiles of Maghreb. Such was Tournon's success that in 1932 he was commissioned to build an actual church in Epinay-sur-Seine to be called "Notre-Dame-des-Missions", this in reinforced concrete and brick and replicating where possible the structure made for the colonial exhibition. A huge number of sculptors, artists, and craftsmen were used by Tournon in the church's decoration including Georges Ballot, Robert Barriot, Elisabeth Branly, Maurice Denis, George Desvallières, Robert-Albert Génico, Jean Hébert-Stevens, Marguerite Hure, Paul de Laboulaye, Henri de Maistre, Henri Marret, Pauline Peugniez, Charles Plessard, Valentine Reyre, André Rinuy, Anne-Marie Roux- Colas, Carlo Sarrabezolles, Lucien Simon, Raymond Virac and Roger Villers (Maurice Denis and George Desvallières were the founders in 1919 of the "Ateliers de l’art sacré"). Two important works which Delamarre had completed for the exhibition stand were to reappear in the Epinay-sur-Seine church; his " Sacré-Cœur " and some of his "Beatitudes".

=== "Exposition coloniale" of 1931-Sacré-Cœur ===
One of Delamarre's contributions to the church was a "Sacré-Cœur" executed in 1930. Delamarre carved his "Sacré-Cœur" from Acajou wood from Cuba. It had a height of 1.80 metres and was dedicated to Jean Brunhes, Delamarre's father-in-law. The pedestal is inscribed

"A Jean Bruhnes, grand savant et grand cœur, 1930. Raymond Delamarre"

The "Sacré-Cœur" statue was shown at the Salon d’Automne of 1930 in the section of "art religieux" organised by George Desvallières. It was then placed in the église Notre-Dame-des-Missions at Epinay- sur-Seine until December 1943 when Delamarre's "Sacré-Cœur" became the property of the new Sacré-Cœur church being built in Dijon. Abbé Tattevin, the church's premier curé had purchased Delamarre's piece. Tattevin issued post card's showing Delamarre's work which were raised to finance the new Dijon church and, now having ownership of the rights of reproduction, he authorized Delamarre to make a plaster copy of the work to be put in the Epinay- sur-Seine church. He also gave approval for reductions to be made of the work in terracotta these in limited editions. The Dijon church was finally inaugurated in 1955 and the original Acajou wood version was placed in front of the church's altar.

=== Work for the Exposition internationale de Bruxelles in 1935 ===
The 1935 Brussels Universal Exhibition was held in Heysel, near Brussels in Belgium from 27 April to 6 November 1935. 25 countries officially participated and a further 5 were unofficially represented. The theme was colonization, marking the 50th anniversary of the establishment of the Congo Free State. For this prestigious exhibition, Delamarre created a relief in plaster entitled "La Ville Lumière", this for the main façade of the Paris pavilion which was designed by the architect Léon Azéma. The Archives de Paris hold details of this work. A maquette of Delamarre's bas-relief was shown in the 1935 exhibition of the "Salon des artistes décorateurs".

=== The 1937 Paris exhibition "Exposition Internationale des Arts et Techniques dans la Vie Moderne" ===
For the Exposition Internationale of 1937, the old Palais du Trocadéro was demolished and replaced by the Palais de Chaillot, designed by architects Louis-Hippolyte Boileau, Jacques Carlu and Léon Azéma. This exhibition took place in Paris where a large area between the Champ-de-Mars and the Invalides, extending to some 105 hectares, had been set aside to accommodate the exhibitions pavilions and stands and some 31 million visitors were recorded. The new buildings are decorated with quotations by Paul Valéry, and sculptural groups at the upper level by Delamarre and Carlo Sarrabezolles. Delamarre's composition is known officially as "La Pensée’ but is also known as "Art et Industrie" or "Les Connaissances Humaines". The work is a group of three allegories "Les Arts plastiques" ("The visual arts"), "La Pensée" and "Les Arts Libéraux". The work was delivered to the founders "Fonderie des Artistes" in 1938, but it was not until after the 1939–45 war that they were erected on the new Palais de Chaillot. The new Palais de Chaillot features two wings shaped to form a wide arc. Each wing is an independent building, and between them there is a wide esplanade which leaves an open view of the Eiffel Tower and beyond. The two wings house a number of museums; the Musée national la Marine (naval museum) and the Musée de l'Homme (Ethnology) are located in the southern (Passy) wing and the Cité de l'Architecture et du Patrimoine, including the Musée national des Monuments Français, in the eastern (Paris) wing, from which one also enters the Théâtre national de Chaillot. It was in the Palais de Chaillot that the United Nations General Assembly adopted the Universal Declaration of Human Rights on December 10, 1948. This event is now commemorated by a stone marker, and the esplanade is known as the "esplanade des droits de l'homme" ("esplanade of human rights").

== Church works ==
=== Église du Sacré-Cœur ===
This church in Dijon holds Delamarre's "Le Sacré-Coeur" and his "Ste-Marguerite-Marie-Alacoque". The decision to build this church in the place Giraud à Dijon was made in 1930 and the consecration took place on 10 May 1938. The church is rich in sculpture with works not only by Delamarre but by H. Bouchard, H. Charlier, M. Real del Sarte, G. Serraz, R. de Villiers and Castex. "Le Sacré-Coeur" had been shown at the 1931 Exposition coloniale as part of Paul Tournon's chapelle des missions catholiques before being moved to the Notre-Dame des missions in Epinay-sur-Seine. In December 1943 it was purchased by the abbé Tattevin and was placed eventually in the Église du Sacré-Cœur. Also in this church is Delamarre's statue of Sainte-Marguerite-Marie-Alacoque holding Jesus' heart.

=== "Les Béatitudes" ===
Apart from the "Sacre-coeur", four of Delamarre's "Béatitudes" (part of the "sermon on the mount" as recorded in the books of Matthew and Luke) were to form part of the church in Épinay-sur-Seine. They were installed along the sides of the church's nave and each carried the words of the appropriate Beatitude. The Épinay church is also known as Notre-Dame-des-Missions-du-cygne d'Enghien. The other four "Béatitudes", also lining the nave, are the work of Anne-Marie Roux-Colas. Tournon's design was meant to encapsulate the various areas served by the Christian missions and therefore reflect the architecture of five continents. The façade of the church is designed with three roofs at the entrance, superimposed one upon another in the Chinese style and decorated with Chinese ideographs. To these are added recumbent angels, Buddhist figures, fetishistic objects, and African-inspired designs. The bell tower is designed in the shape a minaret and the whole facade is covered in blue and white ceramic tiles in a pattern created by Lorymi and Raymond Virac, using a new type of brickwork developed in 1930 by Marguerite Huré. The cement sculptures on the bell tower, depicting the four human races, were sculpted by Carlos Sarrabezolles. Many painters, sculptors and glassworkers participated in the decoration of the inside of the church; most of these artists came from the studios of "Sacred art" founded by Maurice Denis, who had designed the windows for the nearby Notre-Dame du Raincy, and of George Desvallières.

It was important that as a group the artists achieved unity of style, and the results of their collaboration comprise one of the most outstanding examples of French ecclesiastical decoration of the 1930s. Louis Barillet and his studio realized the design of some of the stained glass windows, which depict important figures in the history of evangelization. These are grouped around a figure of Christ as Missionary designed by Jean Hébert-Stevens. Among the other notable artists to work on the stained glass in the church were André Rinuy, Marguerite Huré, and Pauline Peugniez. Important painters were engaged to create the frescos for the church. Chief among these was Henri de Maistre, who illustrated the Christianization of the world after the Resurrection in a series of paintings crafted for the building's side chapels. He chose to depict various French martyrs in his design, placing them against a map showing the great lakes and important cities of Canada. A panel showing the Christianization of southern Algeria and of the Sahara Desert by Charles de Foucauld was created for the interior by Georges Desvallières. A series of murals on the right side of the church building were painted by Raymond Virac, Lucien Simon, and Robert-Albert Génicot; these celebrate the evangelical work done in Indochina and India by Francis Xavier and that done in Japan by Alphonsus Navarette. Charles Plessard and Pauline Peugniez contributed work inspired by the Irish missions of Columba. On the left-hand side of the church may be found depictions of the Christianization of ancient Greece, ancient Rome, Gaul, England, Germany, and the Slavic world. Maurice Denis was the most famous artist to contribute to this series; he was aided by Henri-Justin Marret, Valentine Reyre, Paul de Laboulaye, and Georges Ballot.

Each of Delamarre's four "Beatitudes" were 2.60 metres in height, and were the first beatitude "Bienheureux les pauvres en esprit car le Royaume des cieux est à eux" (How blest are those who know their need of God; the kingdom of Heaven is theirs), the third beatitude "Bienheureux ceux qui pleurent car ils seront consolés" (How blessed are the sorrowful; they shall find consolation ), the sixth beatitude "Bienheureux ceux qui ont le cœur pur car ils verront Dieu"(How blest are those whose hearts are pure; they shall see God), and finally "Bienheureux les pacifiques car ils seront appelés enfants de Dieu" ’ (How blest are the peacemakers; God shall call them his sons).

=== La statue de Saint-Ignace-de-Loyola ===
This statue, sculpted from Lens stone, is to be seen in the Jesuit chapel Claude de la Colombière in Paray-le-Monial. Apart from Delamarre's statue the church also holds Henri Charlier's statue of the "Sacré-Coeur" and another of Père de la Colombière. The plaster depiction of St-Ignace was shown at the 1933 "Salon d’Automne".

=== Église Saint-Félix in Nantes ===
There is a resin model of the Église Notre-Dame des Foyers' "La crucifixion" in this church.

=== Église Notre-Dame des Foyers ===
In the crypt of this church in Paris' rue de Tanger is Delamarre's "La crucifixion" of 1954–55.

=== Église Saint-Antoine de Padoue ===
This church was designed by Léon Azéma. Delamarre executed two statues for the outside of the bell-tower, these depicting "St François d'Assise" and "Ste Elisabeth de Hongrie", statues inside the church depicting "St François d'Assise" and "St Antoine de Padoue" and some of the "Chemin de croix" or "Stations of the Cross". The church also contains a plaster "Sacré-cœur".

== Public statues and monuments ==
Delamarre's work can be seen in several public places as per details below.

=== Antelopes and statue of a woman ===
In 1928 the industrialist R. Didier commissioned this work from Delamarre for the gardens of his house in Pierrefitte-sur-Seine. The marble composition comprises two antelopes and a statue of a woman. It is thought that the work was destroyed during fighting in the area in 1944.

=== The sculptures in Paris' jardin de Reuilly ===
Delamarre's 1947 "Nu féminin" can be seen in this public garden in the l’avenue Daumesnil along with " La Danse" by Charles Malfray and "Amazone" by Georges Chauvel.

=== Diadumène ===
Delamarre's bronze version of this work was shown at the 1933 Salon des artistes français and a marble version was made 1937/1938 and shown in 1939 at the Salon. Based on Polyclète's sculpture "athlète"

=== Monument to Charles Jonnart-Saint Omer ===
The monument's inauguration ceremony on 3 October 1937 was led by Maréchal Pétain. Jonnart came from Fléchin-en-Artois near to Saint Omar, and was regarded as one of the leading politicians of the Third Republic. He became a deputy for the Pas-de-Calais in 1889 and a senator in 1893, and both before and after the 1914–28 war, he led various ministries and participated to the full in French political affairs. Positions held by Jonnart included the presidency in 1907 of the Suez Canal Company and in 1911 he was Minister for Foreign Affairs and French Ambassador to the Vatican from 1921 to 1923. Elected to the Académie française in 1923. Delamarre was commissioned to carry out the sculptural work involved in this monument honouring Jonnart's memory and depicts Jonnart in a bronze bas-relief within a medallion, this set into a tall pedestal at the centre of the monument and beneath which, an allegory for France, carved from black granite, stands in defiant pose. Also on the central pedestal, Delamarre added an outline of the Saint-Pierre de Rome, the Arras belfry and the Parthenon.

=== Monument to Father Brottier ===
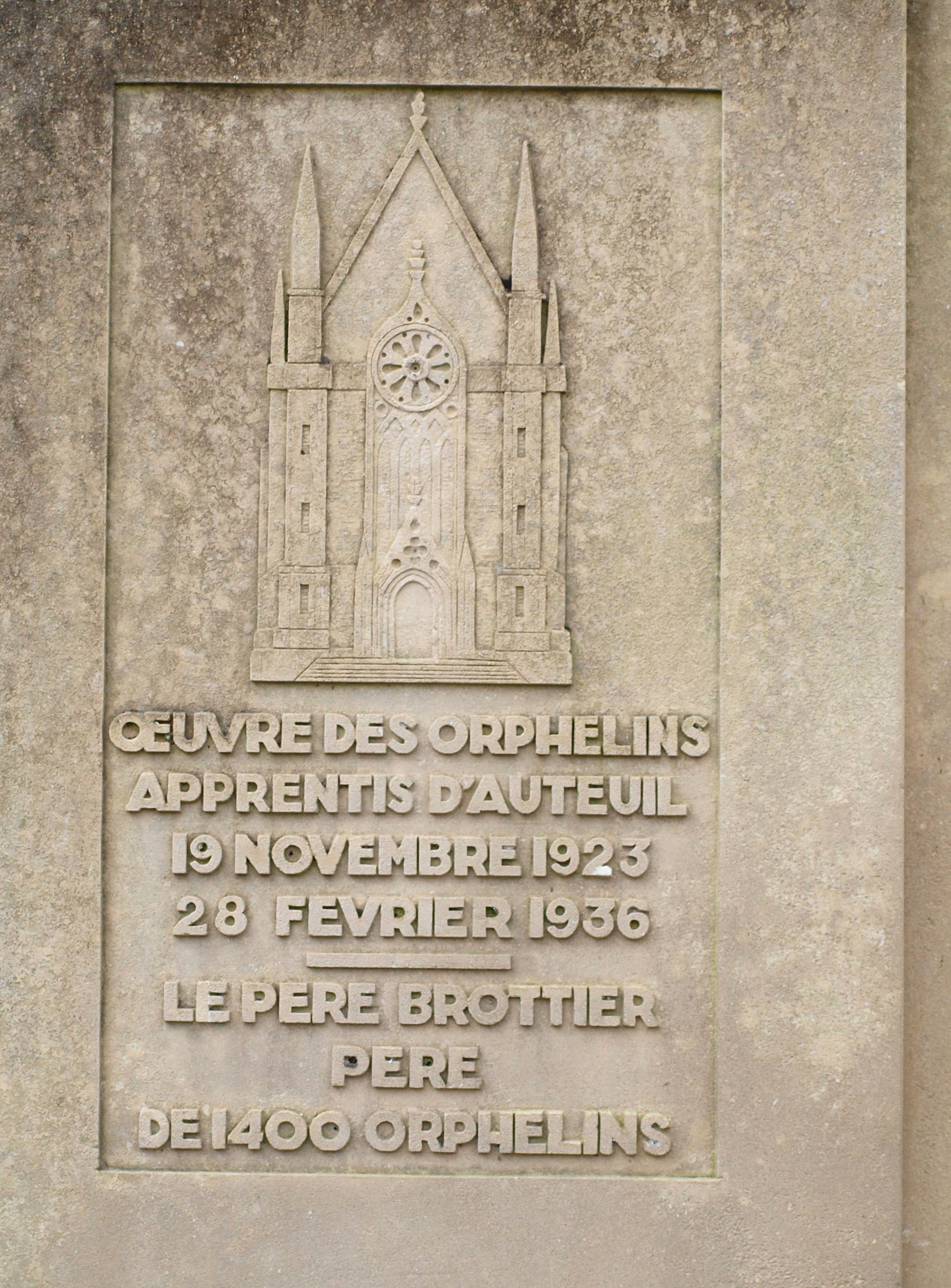
Delamarre's carving on the monument's pedestal states that through his orphanage he is effectively a “father” to 1400 children. The front of the church at Auteuil is shown in relief.

This monument was erected in 1948 in La Ferté-Saint-Cyr, the birthplace of père Daniel Brottier. Brottier lived from 1876 to 1936. He was a French missionary who worked in Senegal and subsequently founded the "Orphelins apprentis d'auteuil", an orphanage for children with special needs. He was declared a saint by Pope Jean-Paul II in 1984. The monument, with sculpture by Delamarre, was inaugurated on 29 August 1948. The Euville stone monument was erected after a public subscription was organised by Maurice Sénart, president of the "Société des Admirateurs du père Daniel Brottier". In 1918 Brottier had founded the Union des Anciens Combattants with Georges Clémenceau. Bronze busts taken from Delamarre's work were reproduced in various limited editions.

=== Monument to Jean Cras in Brest ===
Jean Cras was a career naval officer and a talented musician. He wrote pieces for both piano and organ, chamber music, symphonic works and the opera "Polyphème". He died in 1932 and a monument was erected in Brest to honour his memory, the sculptural work involved being carried out by Delamarre. The work was destroyed in 1944 but recreated by Delamarre in 1959. In Delamarre's composition, the muses of the sea and music, Cras' two great loves, sit on either side of a bronze medallion depicting the composer/sailor. The dedication on the monument is a line from Polyphème

"Belle mer écumeuse et bleue où je suis né"

=== Bust of Eugène Etienne ===
Eugène Étienne (15 December 1844 – 13 May 1921) was a French politician born in Oran, Algeria. He was a member of the Chamber of Deputies from 1881 to 1919 and a Senator from 1920 to 1921. He was one of the founders of the École coloniale. As Minister of the Interior, he presented the 1905 law separating the Church from the State. Held various other ministerial posts during his career. The Ếcole coloniale in Paris' avenue de l’Observatoire requested a bust of Étienne and Delamarre was commissioned to execute it. He began with a version in plaster and a marble version followed a year later and was shown at the Salon des artistes français (n°3553) before delivery to the École coloniale. It seems that the plaster version of the bust was broken. The École coloniale became the École nationale de la France d'Outre-Mer and then the École nationale d'administration (ENA) and the present whereabouts of Delamarre's bust is not known.

=== "Les Arts et les Monuments Régionaux" on the ocean liner Normandie ===
Delamarre was commissioned to carry out work on the decoration of the iconic SS."Normandie" ocean liner (Paquebot in French)) and in 1935 he completed a large relief entitled "Les Arts et Monuments Régionaux" for the liner's first class dining room. These decorations were regarded as one of the "chefs-d’œuvre" of the Art déco movement, the decoration being organised by the architects and decorators Pierre Patout and Henri Pacon. There were four reliefs commissioned for the dining room, each 6 metres high and 4 metres in length. Apart from Delamarre's relief, the other three were by Léon Drivier, Pierre Poisson et Albert Pommier.

=== Decoration for the George V (Four Seasons) hotel in Paris ===
The hotel had been built between 1927 and 1928 by architects Georges Wybo and Constant Lefranc and over the years Delamarre was to execute several major works for the hotel; "Frise d’enfants" for the " Salon anglais", "La Tentation" or "Adam et Eve" for the "Salon Chantilly", two eagles for an atrium in the hotel and the "Ronde de jeunes filles" for the terrasse garden of the hotel's "suite royale".

=== Persée et Andromède ===
For this 1928 sculpture, Delamarre depicts Perseus riding his horse Pegasus and saving Andromeda from a sea monster who was on the point of devouring her. The sculpture is located at the entrance to the Léo Lagrange stadium (Stade de Vincennes) on the Route de la Pyramide and facing the Floral de Vincennes park. The work is 3 metres high. The themes of "Persée et Andromède" and "Nessus et Déjanire" were much visited by Delamarre.

=== Orival ===
From 1949 to 1956 Delamarre worked on an outdoor statue of St Joseph, a "Vierge" and the "chemin de croix" (The stations of the Cross) located near the church in Orival near Elbeuf. The Musée Elbeuf hold some of Delamarre's plaster workings for the chemin de croix given to the museum as a gift by the Delamarre family.

=== La chapelle du CHU - Hôtel Dieu ===
The hospital and chapel is located in Nantes's rue Gaston Veil. It was designed by the architects Michel Roux Spitz, P. Joëssel and Y. Liberge between 1951 and 1964. Delamarre executed 12 bas-reliefs for the front of the chapel. The earlier chapel had been badly damaged by aerial bombing in 1943 when bombs hit the hospital. The bas-reliefs cover various medical themes such as "L’apposition des mains de Dieu sur un céphalalgique", "‘Et Dieu fait parler les muets" and "‘Et les aveugles voient".

=== The statue entitled "Ad excelsa" in the Lycée Arago in Perpignan ===
The Nice architect Roger Séassal commissioned Delamarre to execute this statue in Lens stone. The height of the statue is 2 metres and was erected in 1961 being placed in the Lycée's "jardin d’honneur". The inscription reads "AD EXCELSA" a shortened version of "AD EXCELSA PER EXCELSUM".

=== Bust of the Comte de la Pérouse ===
Jean-François de Galaup, comte de Lapérouse was a naval officer and explorer. This bust is located in the Promenade d’Australie in Paris'15th arrondissement. A photograph of the bust is shown in the gallery at the end of this article.

=== Monument to Robert Garric in Aurillac ===
Garric was a French catholic intellectual and man of letters and a medallion created by Delamarre depicting Garric was erected in the main entrance of the Cité universitaire's "maison internationale" in Paris. In 1972 permission was given to reproduce the medallion for the monument in Aurillac. The monument's inauguration took place on 2 July 1972. The monument carries the inscription

"Robert Garric 1896–1967 Fondateur des équipes sociales"

=== The lycée de Bellevue in Martinique ===
Delamarre's "L’Antillaise" or "Créole" is located in the Lycée de jeunes filles Bellevue in Fort de France. Delamarre used the semi-hard stone of Vilhonneur for this statue which is 2.8 metres high. Delamarre's work is one of three statues which are grouped together. The statue was sculpted in Paris and shipped to Martinique in December 1963. The two other statues were by Claude Grange and Carlo Sarrabezolles. Delamarre's statue stands on the right of the group, Sarrabezolles statue entitled "Les fruits de la Terre" stands on the right and Claude Granges "La Métropole" is in the middle. In Delamarre's composition the woman depicted carries a basket containing fish and shell fish.

== War memorials ==
France was to pay a high price for her involvement in the First World War. Some 7 million men were mobilised of which approximately 1,750,000 were to lose their lives and a huge number of memorials, both public and parish, were required to quench the need of communities to record their loss in some tangible way, a memorial seeming to fill this need. Delamarre, an army veteran himself, and decorated with the Croix de Guerre, worked on four war memorials, those at Brest, Pontault-Combault and at Saint-Martin-de-Ré and that in Rome for the "Séminaire français". For Saint-Martin-de-Ré, Delamarre sculpted a weeping woman ("pleureuse") and an allegory of the victorious motherland, for Pontault-Combault, another female allegory of victory. For his Rome composition, Delamarre chose various religious symbols despite the new French law of 9 December 1905 which banned religious emblems from public monuments (it was this law which was to lead to most French communes having a public war memorial and a second memorial in the parish church). Delamarre's contribution to the Brest war memorial was to execute four bas-reliefs when Bazin, the sculptor originally commissioned to work on the memorial, died.

=== Pontault-Combault War memorial ===
Forty-two men from this small commune in Seine-et-Marne, out of 167 men mobilized, lost their lives fighting for France in the 1914–18 war, and in 1920 it was decided to erect a monument in their honour, and a competition was organised to select architect and sculptor. The award went to Delamarre. The inauguration took place on 27 August 1922. The monument can be found in "Vieux-Pontault" on the place du Général Leclerc (place de l'église). Delamarre used Chauvigny stone to create a standing female allegory of "Victory", winged and with sword. Interesting to note that Delamarre's parents lived in the commune

=== Saint-Martin-de-Ré War memorial ===
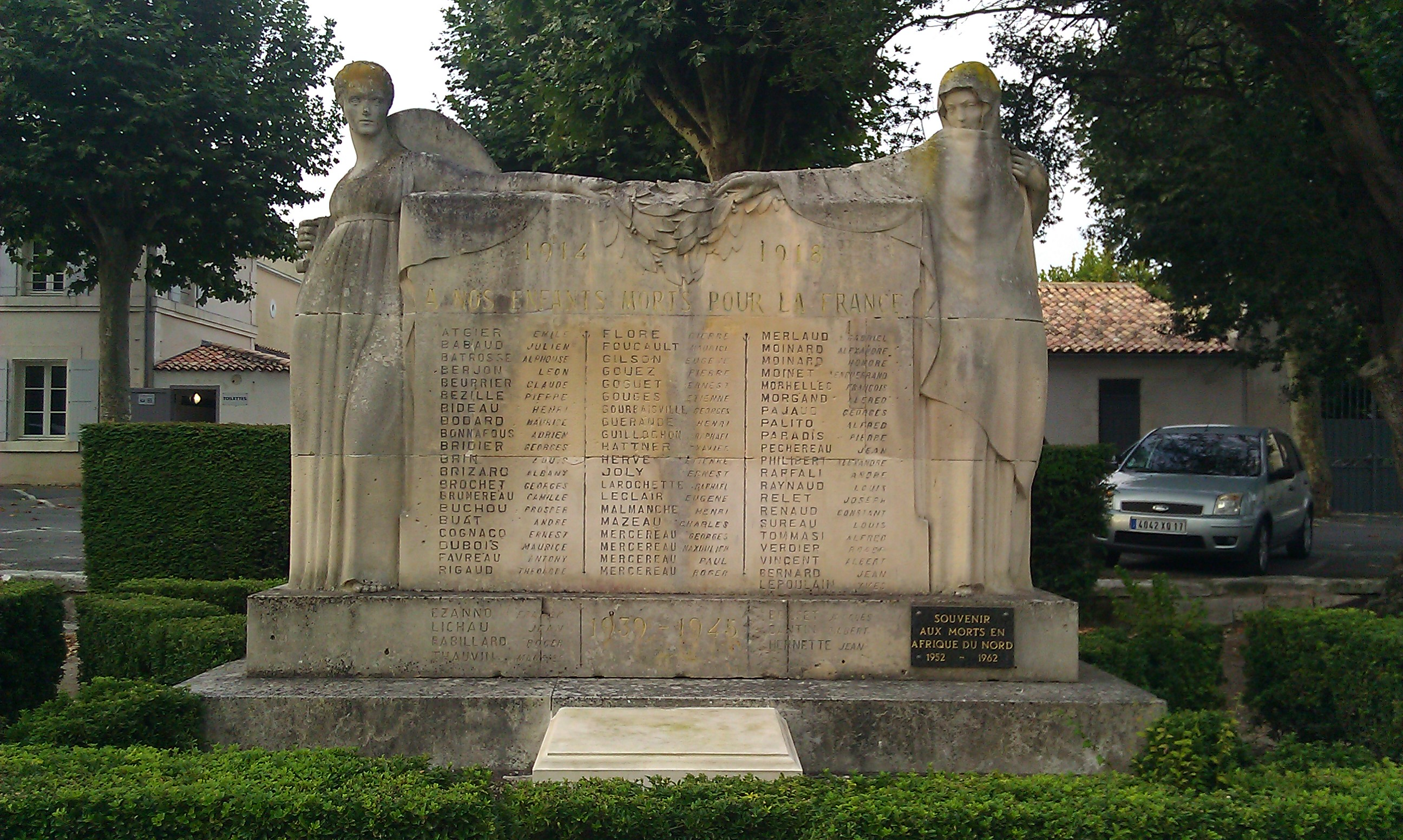
Saint-Martin-de-Ré's war memorial. Delamarre's allegories of a victorious France and a France in mourning join hands and hold a crown of laurel above a list of the men of the commune who gave their lives In the 1914–18 war

In the centre of the memorial, which is carved from Lavoux stone, is a rectangular panel on which the names of the men of Saint-Martin-de-Ré who died in the 1914–18 war are listed. On either side of this central panel are two standing female figures whose hands are joined across the panel and hold a crown of laurel over the list of names, its leaves hanging down the face of the memorial. The figure on the left is a winged allegory of victory, complete with sword, whilst on the right side is an allegory for grief, the "Douleur" or mourner, her head and arms covered in a shroud. The two allegorical figures pay a final hommage to those who have departed. The monument's inauguration took place on 15 October 1922.

=== Brest war memorial ===
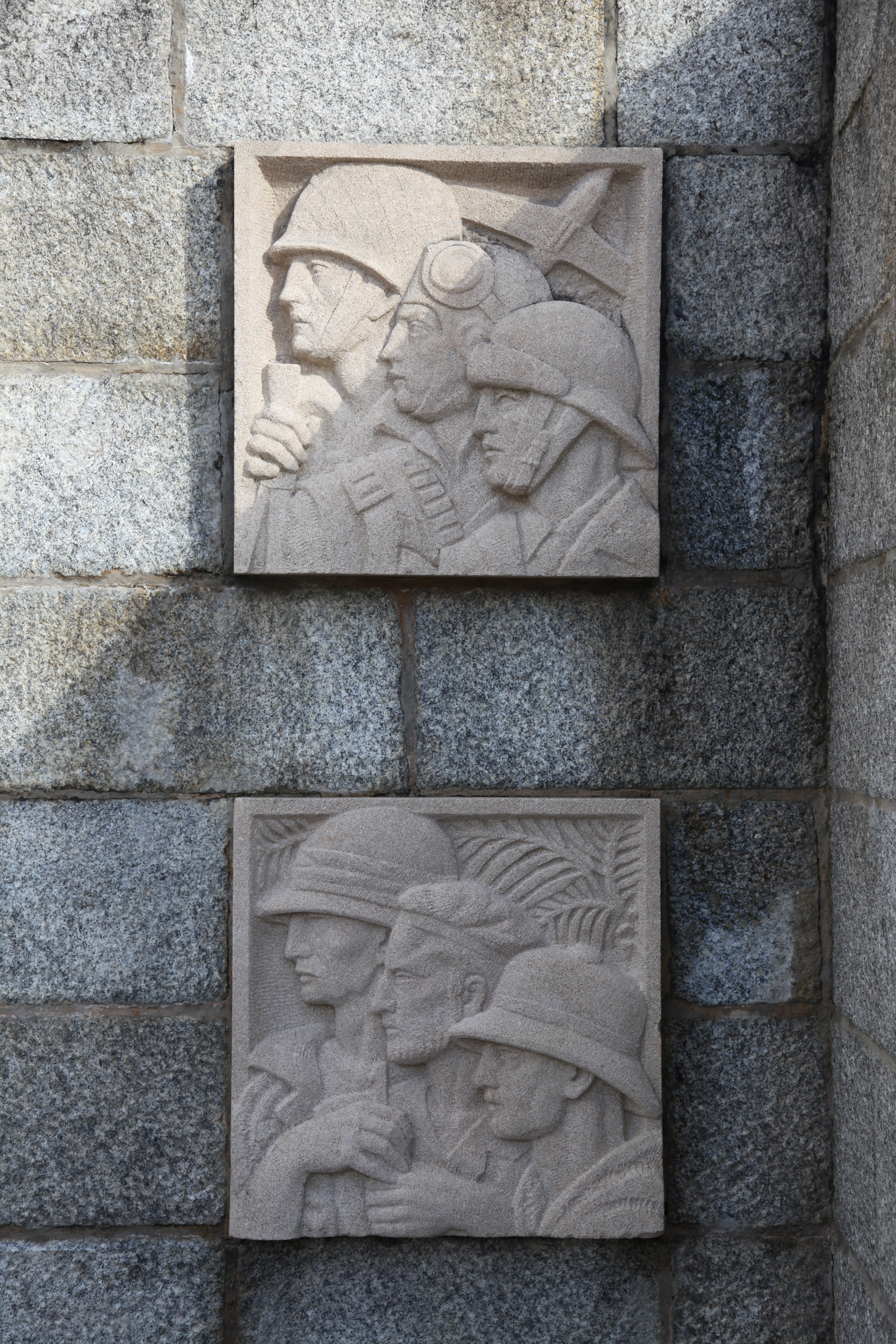
The two reliefs on the right hand side of the Brest war memorial

The original Brest war memorial had been destroyed by the occupying Germans in 1944. It had been erected in 1900 and paid tribute to the soldiers and marines of Brittany engaged defending France in 1870 and also those who had fought and died in colonial wars. It had been inscribed

"AUX MARINS ET SOLDATS BRETONS MORTS POUR LA PATRIE NOVEMBRE 1900"

. It had sculpture by Auguste Maillard which had been cast in bronze by Perzinka. In the 1950s architects Jean-Baptiste Mathon and Maurice Piquemal where commissioned to carry out a major reconstruction of Brest which had been badly damaged in the 1939–40 war and the new Brest which emerged included a new public space to be known as the place de la Liberté. The reconstruction involved a new war memorial which was built in this new public square. It was to be almost a Franco-American memorial for Brest had been a landing place for the American forces in 1918 and, of course, the Americans had played the leading role in the 1944 invasion and defeat of Germany. The new memorial was to comprise a central granite obelisk decorated with a sculpture by Raymond Veysset inspired by some lines from Péguy-"heureux les épis murs et les blés moissonnés" and bas-reliefs by François Bazin. This would now be a memorial covering the 1870 and the two world wars. The memorial included the words in Breton and French, "D'hor bugale maro evit ar vro" and "La ville de Brest à ses enfants morts pour la France". Completion of the monument was in fact delayed and Bazin died resulting in Delamarre being commissioned to complete the bas-reliefs.

When completed the new memorial involved a base made from reinforced concrete from which rises a 20-metre-high pedestal, and on either side of this pedestal, a wall carries four bas-reliefs by Delamarre. The first of these depicts French soldiers of 1870 vintage wearing the uniforms of the time. A marine carries a rifle and wears the distinctive "pompom" beret, whilst the infantryman wears a képi and the cavalryman a cuirassier's helmet and holds a sabre. In the second bas-relief we have soldiers of the 1914–18 war. The infantryman who would have fought at the beginning of the war wears the képi but by his side we see the infantryman who would have fought later in the war; he now wears a helmet and holds a grenade in his hand. Bas-relief three shows two colonial soldiers wearing their distinctive hats and acknowledging the contribution they made and between them the soldier depicted wears the sort of beret one would associate with SAS parachutists/commandos. It was French parachutists of the 4th SAS regiment who were parachuted into Brittany on the nights of the 5 and 6 June 1944. The final and fourth bas-relief depicts the soldiers of 1939–45. An infantryman wears a US helmet, a pilot wears a flying helmet, goggles and parachute harness and a member of the armoured forced wears the helmet worn by such soldiers.

=== The monument to the 1st Division Free French Forces at Cavalaire-sur-Mer ===
Very near the beach at Cavalaire-sur-Mer is the "Square du Souvenir" in which there are four monuments dedicated to the Allied landings of the 15 and 16 August 1944. One of these is a monument dedicated to the "1st Division Français libre" which dates to 1958. The architects were Delamarre's daughter Béatrice Delamarre-Levard and her husband Yves Levard. The monument celebrates the division's landing at La Croix-Valmer led by General Diego Brosset as part of Operation Dragoon. The inauguration took place on 31 May 1959. The inscription on the monument, carved by Delamarre, reads

"Dans cette baie de Cavalaire le 16 août 1944 prit pied sur la terre de France la 1ère Division des Français Libres qui s’étaient réunis au cœur de l’Afrique et dans l’Océan pacifique en septembre 1940 pour reconquérir leur pays envahi et avaient ouvert leur chemin par les armes à travers l’Erythrée, la Syrie, la Libye, la Tunisie et l’Italie avant d’aborder ici pour de nouveaux combats victorieux"

=== Bust of Diego Brosset ===
This bust is part of the 1955 monument to General Diego Brosset and the 1st Division of the Free French Army. The monument is located on the banks of the Seine, near the bridges Pont de Grenelle and the Pont de Bir-Hakeim in Paris. The architects were Béatrice Delamarre-Levard, Delamarre's daughter and her husband Yves Levard. It was in August 1943 that Brosset took command of the 1st Division of the Free French Army and on 16 August 1944 his forces landed on the coast of Provence at Cavalaire and participated in the taking of Toulon, Hyères, Lyon, Autun and Dijon. From the 20 September to the 19 November he commanded the Free French forces in the Battle of the Vosges. He lost his life on 19 November 1944. The monument includes a panel carrying the inscription

"A la première division française libre et ses 4000 morts aux braves et aux fidèles qui répondirent à l’appel du Général de Gaulle de juin 1940 et combattirent 6 ans pour libérer la France dans l’honneur et par la victoire Afrique centrale Erythrée Syrie Lybie Bir Hakeim Tunisie Italie Provence Vosges Alsace"

=== Monument aux séminaristes morts en 14-18 ===
The "Séminaire Pontifical Français" in Rome was a training school for French priests founded in 1853 by Father Louis-Marie Banazer de Lannurien, a follower of François Libermann. The mobilization of 1914 had seen many students at such seminaries return to France for active service and the Rome seminary was no exception. 95 trainee priests from the seminary were called up and 33 of these lost their lives. In 1922 it was decided to erect a memorial in honour of these men and Michel Roux-Spitz was commissioned to design it and Delamarre to add the sculptural content. At the time both Roux-Spitz and Delamarre were studying at the Villa Médicis. The inauguration took place on 17 December 1922. At the very top of the memorial and under an arch, two peacocks in profile face towards a cross, and below two angels kneel in prayer on either side of a list of the names of the men honoured. The central inscription on the memorial reads

‘VOS SCITIS QUANTA FECIMUS ET PRAELIA ET ANGUSTIAS QUALES VIDIMUS"

-Maccabees 1 XIII.

=== Monument à la Défense du Canal de Suez ===
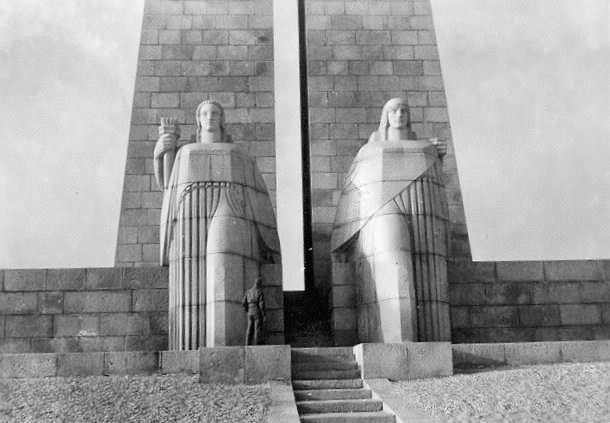
Delamarre's two statues on the Suez Canal memorial, "L'Intelligence Sereine" and "La Force Sévère

This memorial celebrates an action to defend the Suez Canal in 1915. A competition to secure an architect and sculpture for the monument was organized in 1925 by the Cie Universelle du Canal Maritime de Suez and was won by the architect Michel Roux-Spitz and Delamarre. It was a huge project and kept Delamarre busy from 1925 to 1930. He produced two huge statues of winged angels in the rose granite of Sardinia, these being 8 m (26 ft) high and 13 m (43 ft) in length. They were placed at the base of two 40 m (130 ft) high pylons, the space between each pylon representing the canal itself. The monument celebrated the defence of the Suez Canal in 1915 by a force of British, Egyptian, French and Italian troops who repulsed an attack by the Turkish army. In Roux-Spitz's vision "un énorme phare double que l'on verra de plusieurs kilomètres". Delamarre's two winged angels carry flaming torches and stand as "gardienne des destinées du pays" and can be seen by all ships passing through the canal. With Delamarre travelling to Egypt on many occasions in these five years, he engaged a team of "praticiens" to live "in situ" and a huge wooden scaffolding was erected on the site to facilitate their work. Delamarre's two statues were entitled "L'Intelligence Sereine" and "La Force Sévère’ and models of both, scaled down to 1/10 of their actual size, can be seen in the Musée des Années 30 (Espace Landowski) at Boulogne- Billancourt. The inauguration took place on 3 February 1930. A special medal was struck to celebrate this inauguration, the medal designed by Delamarre himself.

== Funerary sculpture ==
Delamarre was commissioned to work on several graves as per details below.

=== Tomb of a young man-Béthune ===
Delamarre received his first private commission in 1920 when asked to sculpt a statue for the tomb of a youngster called Jacques, and he created a 2-metre-high marble statue of a weeping woman ("pleureuse").

=== la Mise au tombeau de Chartres (1934) ===
This work in Carrara marble can be seen in the Gault-Saint-Denis cemetery near Chartres. Commissioned by Louis Fleury for the family tomb.

=== The tomb of the Vetter family ===
In 1924, Delamarre worked with the architect Michel Roux Spitz and fellow sculptor Marcel Renard on the family tomb for the Vetters in the Croix-Rousse cemetery in Lyon. Renard worked on carving general decoration for the tomb whereas Delamarre executed a "Douleur".

=== Sculpture for the grave of Louis Théodore David ===
David was the mayor of Andernos-les-Bains from 1900 to 1929. He was buried at his own request in the grounds of his villa now known as "Maison Louis David". Delamarre executed sculpture for the tomb.

== Medals ==
Delamarre was responsible for a huge number of medals.

== Gallery of photographs of Delamarre's work ==
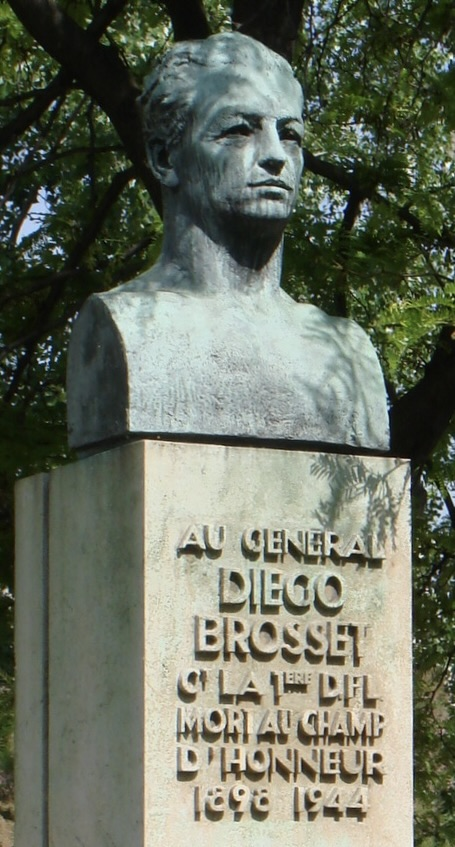
Bust of Diego Brosset. Free French Forces.

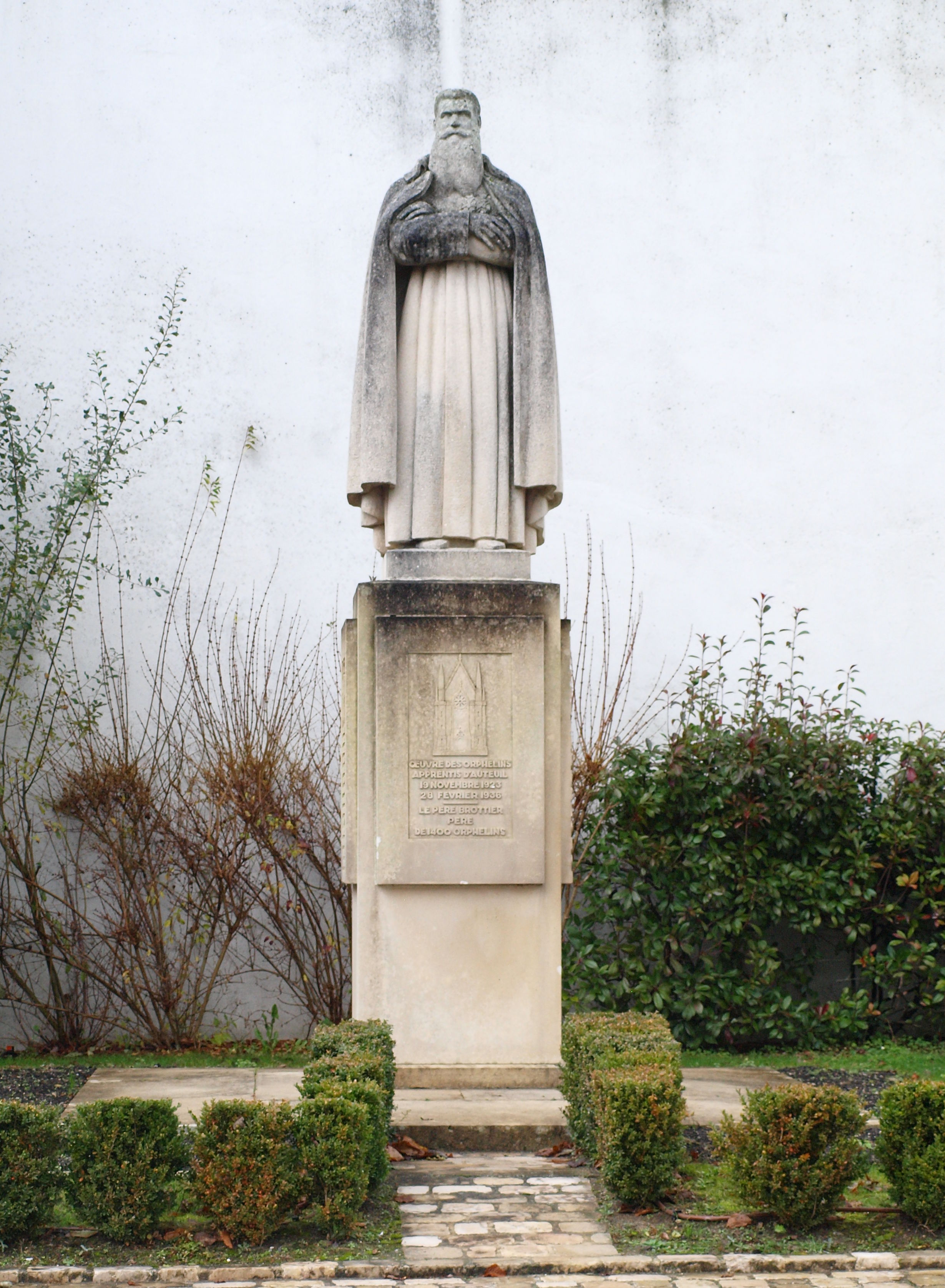
The La Ferté-Saint-Cyr statue of Père Brottier.

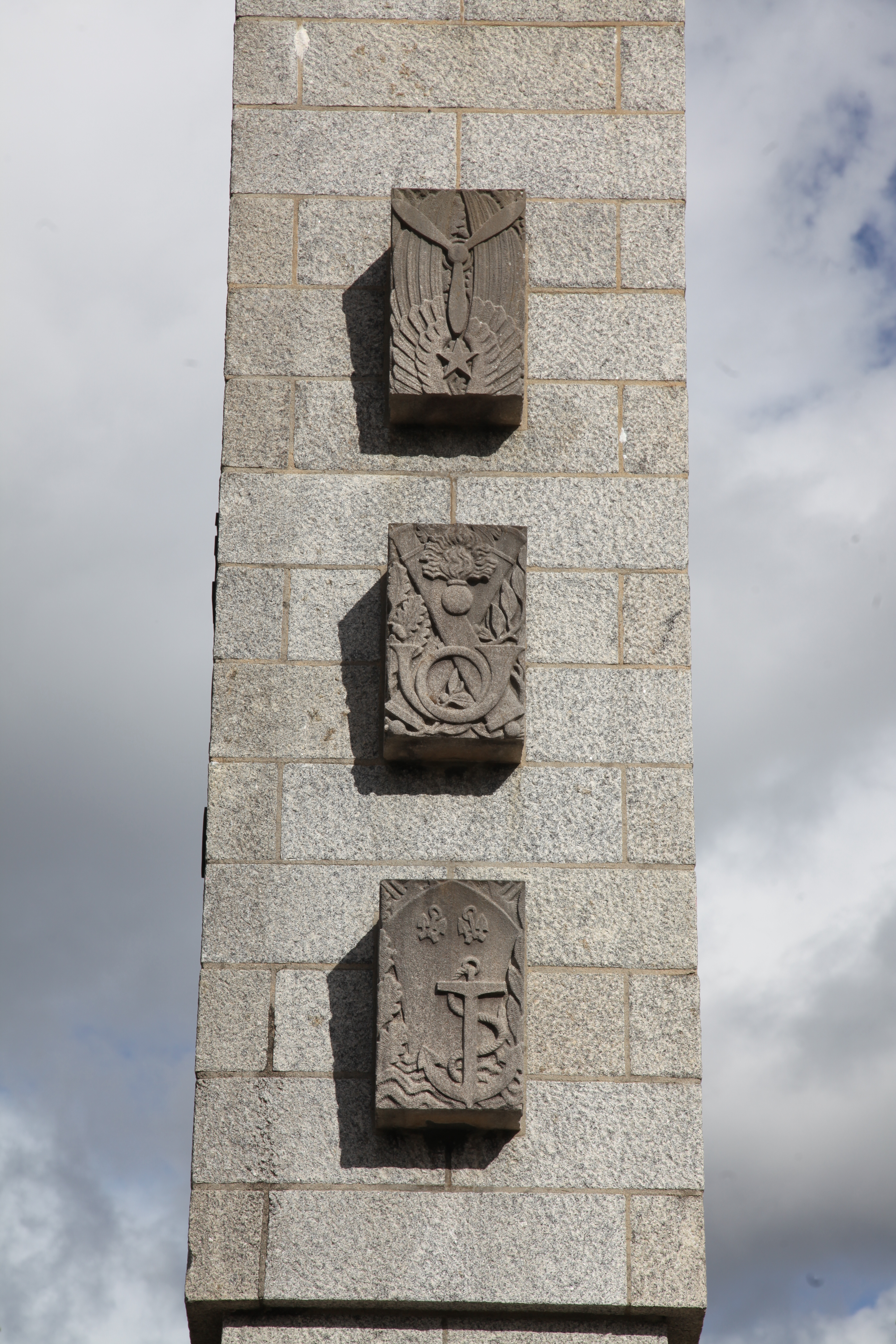
Emblems on the Brest war memorial
