= Jean Poirier (ethnologist) =

French ethnologist (1921–2009)

Jean Poirier (4 June 1921 – 2 July 2009) was a French researcher, ethnologist, sociologist, and lawyer. He was a Doctor of Letters and Doctor of Law, member of the Society of Oceanists within the Musée de l'Homme, member of the Academy of Overseas Sciences, Director of the Department of Human Sciences of the University of Madagascar from 1961 to 1969 and professor in the Faculty of Letters of Université Nice-Sophia-Antipolis from 1969 to his death.

Jean Poirier is the author of numerous reference books and the history of ethnology, as well as numerous case studies. He has also been a scientific editor, publication director, thesis director, and has carried out extensive research not only in ethnology but also in anthropology, demography, the social sciences, and legal sociology.

== Publications ==
=== As an author or collaborator ===
- « Religions des primitifs » (V^{e} et dernier chapitre de l'ouvrage Histoire des religions, 1953, in collaboration with Pierre Gordon and Patrick O'Reilly)
- L'Élément blond en Polynésie et les migrations nordiques en Océanie et en Amérique (1953)
- Ethnologie de l'Union française (territoires extérieurs) (1953, avec André Leroi-Gourhan, André-Georges Haudricourt et Charles-André Julien)
- Maurice Leenhardt, l'homme et son œuvre (extrait du tome 10 du Journal de la Société des océanistes, décembre 1954)
- La Nouvelle-Calédonie : géographie et histoire, économie, démographie, ethnologie (en collaboration avec Jean-Paul Faivre, 1955)
- Maurice Leenhardt (1955, en allemand, monographie portant sur l'ethnologue de même nom)
- Nouvelle-Calédonie : documents iconographiques anciens (1959, with Patrick O'Reilly)
- L'Originalité des droits coutumiers de l'Afrique noire (1959)
- Nouvelle-Calédonie : Documents iconographiques anciens (1959, with Patrick O'Reilly)
- La Femme (1959–1962, avec Annie Dorsinfang-Smets, deux volumes réédités en 1983)
- L'Enquête ethnologique, guide d'étude monographique appliquée aux sociétés malgaches (1962)
- Questionnaire d'ethnologie juridique appliqué à l'enquête de droit coutumier (1963)
- Les Groupes ethniques de Madagascar, rapport préliminaire sur un inventaire des « tribus » (1963, avec Jacques Dez)
- Civilisation malgache (1964, avec Siméon Rajaona et Laurent Botokeky)
- Le Fokonolona merina (1969)
- Histoire de l'ethnologie (1969, numéro 1318 de la collection « Que sais-je ? », PUF, rééditions successives en 1974, 1984 et 1991)
- Les Bezanozano, contribution à l'étude des structures sociales d'une population malgache (1970, thèse doctorale sous la direction de Hubert Deschamps)
- Tahitiens d'autrefois (1978, with José Garanger and Patrick O'Reilly)
- Économie et population en Guadeloupe : la baisse de la fécondité et l'accroissement de l'émigration : les tendances d'un même processus (1981, avec Marianne Kempeneers, Université de Montréal)
- Les Récits de vie : théorie et pratique (1983, avec Simone Clapier-Valladon et Paul Raybaut, rééditions successives en 1989, 1993 et 1996)
- « L'Envers du mythe : La situation des femmes en Guadeloupe » (1985, avec Huguette Dagenais, in Nouvelles Questions féministes)
- « La Situation des femmes dans l'agriculture en Guadeloupe » (avec Huguette Dagenais, article paru dans la publication Environnement africain, avril 1985)
- Évolution historique des rapports sociaux en Guadeloupe (1985, rapport de recherche pour l'Université de Montréal)
- Structure sociale, modes d'organisation familiale et baisse de la fécondité en Guadeloupe : 1954-1982 (1989, sous la direction de Victor Piché, Université de Montréal)
- Les Centenaires de l'an 2000 à la Réunion (1999, textes de Jean Poirier et de Sudel Fuma; photographies de Christian Kichenapanaïdou et de Sulliman Issop)

=== As a scientific editor ===
- Études de droit africain et de droit malgache (1965)
- Monnaie et para-monnaie dans les sociétés non-industrielles : études et travaux (1970)
- Tradition et dynamique sociale à Madagascar (1978)
- Ny Razana tsy mba maty : Cultures traditionnelles malgaches (1984)
- La Douleur et le droit (1997)

=== As scientific editor and publication director ===
- Six des quarante-neuf volumes de l'encyclopédie de la Pléiade :
  - Ethnologie générale (d'abord publiée en 1968 et plusieurs fois rééditée par la suite)
  - Ethnologie régionale (deux tomes d'abord publiés en 1972 et 1978 et plusieurs fois réédités par la suite)
  - Histoire des mœurs (trois tomes publiés entre 1990 et 1991, réédités par la suite en 1993 et en 2002)

=== Preface ===
- L'Autre et l'ailleurs : hommage à Roger Bastide (Brionne : Association Bastidiana, 1976, réédité en 2007)
- Roure des siècles et des jours : le passé retrouvé d'un village des Alpes-Maritimes (Simone Clapier-Valladon et Victor Clapier, 1987)
- Gabon entre tradition et postmodernité : dynamique des structures d'accueil Fang (Bernardin Minko Mve, 2003)
- Qui a peur de la culture ? : une théorie scientifique de la culture (Raymond Chasle, 2003)
- Les Beautés noires de Baudelaire (Elvire Maurouard, 2005)
- Racines d'Équinoxe, poèmes de l'Équateur (Marie-France Duparl-Danaho, 2009)
