= Mariel Jean-Brunhes Delamarre =

French writer, geographer (1905-2001)

- Born: Mariel Brunhes; 13 August 1905; Fribourg, Switzerland
- Died: 1 November 2001 (aged 96)
- Occupations: Geographer, writer
- Spouse: Raymond Delamarre
- Children: 4

Mariel Jean-Brunhes Delamarre (1905–2001), was a French writer, geographer and ethnologist. She became a zealous follower of her famous ethnographer father.

== Biography ==
Born 13 August 1905 in Fribourg, Switzerland, she was the daughter of the French geographer Jean Brunhes, She accompanied him from an early age in his fieldwork and participated in his research work.

When she was 18, Mariel Brunhes added her father's name to her own becoming Mariel Jean-Brunhes.

In 1926, she travelled to Crete with the archaeologist Marthe Oulié and published their findings.

In 1927, at the age of 22, she traveled to Canada with her father, developing a narrative of human geography and ethnology together. The trip became the subject of a documentary about Mariel written and directed by her son, Jean-Noël Delamarre, based on his discovery of unpublished film and photographic evidence of the "unusual collaboration between two geographers, one confirmed: the father, the other budding, his daughter." The English title for the 1999 film is An Eye on the World.

In 1927, Mariel married Raymond Delamarre, winner of the Grand Prix de Rome for sculpture in 1919 and became known as Mariel Jean-Brunhes Delamarre. The couple had four children together.

In 1957 Mariel was put in charge of the mission of the National Museum of Popular Arts and Traditions, and she became a research associate at the French National Centre for Scientific Research (CNRS) in 1958.

As a "pioneer" of ethnology, she undertook emergency ethnology missions aimed at preserving the memory of the pre-industrial society that was disappearing. She then wrote a thesis in ethnography under the direction of the anthropologist André Leroi-Gourhan, which she defended in 1966. Her major works focused on rural France and shepherds.

She was co-editor of Universal Geography (Larousse, 1958) and of the Geography volume of the Encyclopédie de la Pléiade (Gallimard, 1966).

She is also known for her many civic engagements.

Jean-Bruhnes Delamarre died on 1 November 2001. Her papers are kept at the National Archives.

== Functions ==
- Secretary of the National Union for Women's Suffrage (pre-war).
- Vice-president of the Christian Fraternity movement in Vietnam, Cambodia and Laos (1970s).

== Awards and distinctions ==
- Montyon Prize of the French Academy in 1939 for France in the World (published in 1946)
- Winner of the Charles Garnier Prize of the Paris Geographical Society in 1927
- Knight of Order of Agricultural Merit in 1963

== Selected publications ==
Jean-Bruhnes Delamarre published many works from 1926 to 1986.

- André G. Haudricourt and Mariel Jean-Brunhes Delamarre, Man and the Plough across the World, New ed. / Lyon: la Manufacture,1986
- Mariel Jean-Bruhnes-Delamarre, Agricultural and pastoral life in the world, Meudon-Bellevue, ed. Joël Cuenod,1985
- Mariel Jean-Brunhes Delamarre, The Shepherd in Village France. Common Shepherds in Saint-Véran in Queyras and Normée in Champagne, Paris, Ed. of the National Center for Scientific Research, 1970, 290 p.
- Pierre Deffontaines and Mariel Jean-Brunhes Delamarre; maps by Jacques Bertin, Aerial Atlas (5 volumes), Paris, Gallimard, 1955–1964
- Mariel Jean-Bruhnes Delamarre, Problems of human geography, Saint-Amand, impr. R. Bussière, (Paris), Bloud and Gay,1939, 236 p.
