= Pierre Deffontaines =

French geographer

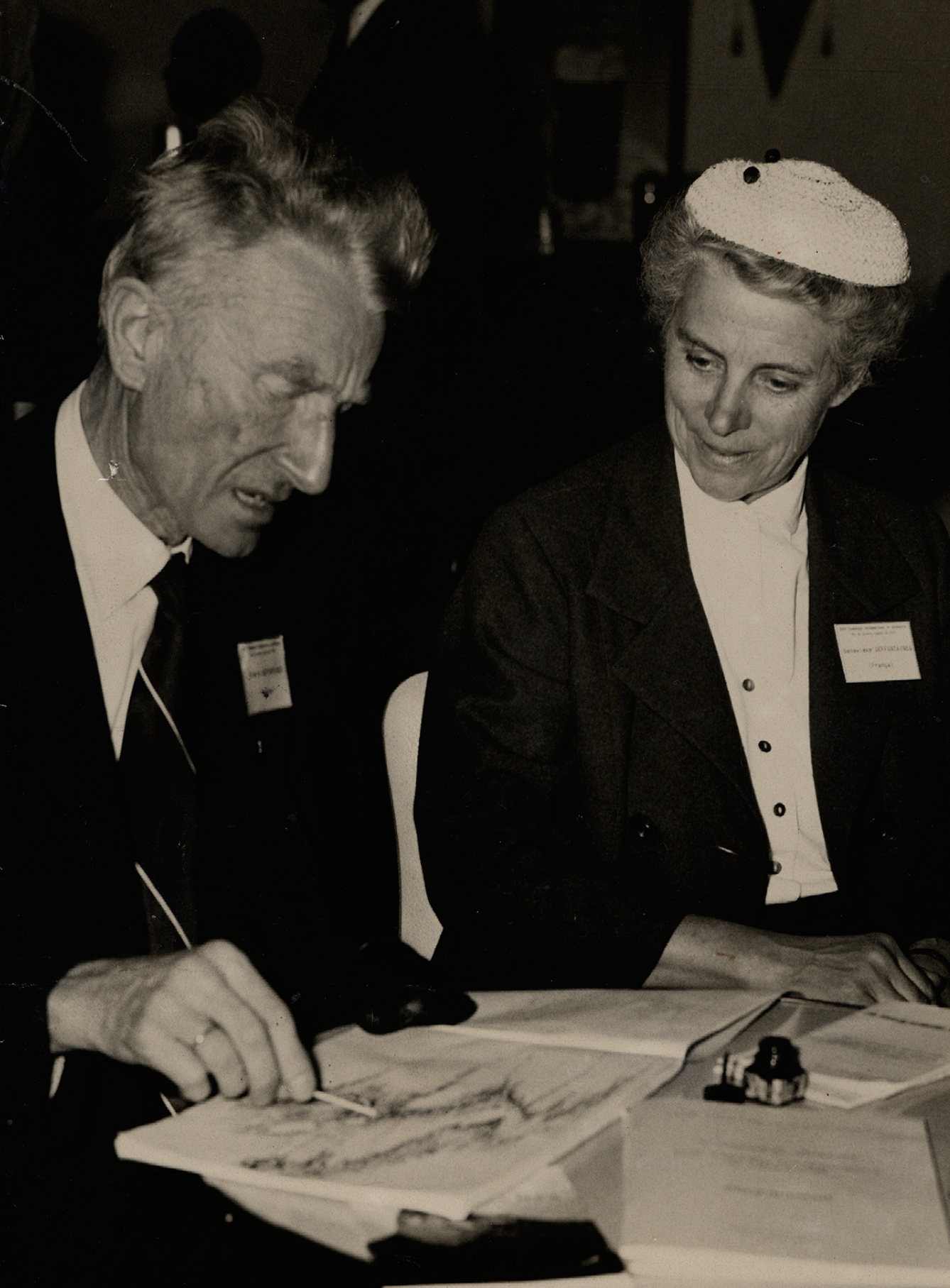
In 1956

Pierre Deffontaines (February 21, 1894 – November 25, 1978) was a French geographer and professor. A specialist in human geography, he directed the volumes on general and regional geography of the Bibliothèque de la Pléiade.

== Biography ==
Born in Limoges, he studied law at the University of Poitiers and graduated in 1916. Introduced to the study of prehistory, he became interested in geography following lectures by Jean Brunhes at the Collège de France. After studying geography and history at the University of Paris, he obtained his Diplôme d'Études Supérieures with a thesis entitled Géographie préhistorique du Limousin et de son pourtour sédimentaire, completed under Albert Demangeon. He then received a scholarship from the Fondation Thiers to prepare his doctoral dissertation, presented in 1932 under the title Les hommes et leurs travaux dans les pays de la Moyenne Garonne.

He taught at the Faculty of Letters of Lille from 1924 to 1938. During this period, he participated of the Societé de géographie de Lille Maximillien Sorre, serving as its secretary general from 1931 to 1937, and was a member of the Société de géographie of Paris. He was present at the International Geographical Union congresses held in Paris in 1931 and Amsterdam in 1938.

In 1934, he was invited to become professor at the newly established Faculty of Letters, Languages and Human Sciences of the University of São Paulo, where he established the chair in geography, in which he was succeeded by Pierre Monbeig. In Brazil, he fomented the establishment of the Associação dos Geógrafos Brasileiros. In 1938, he was appointed director of the Institut français de Barcelone, a position he occupied until 1964. From 1964 to 1967, he taught at the University of Montpellier.
