= Huguette Dagenais =

Canadian anthropologist

Huguette Dagenais (born 1943) is a French-Canadian anthropologist who until her retirement headed the feminist studies program at Université Laval in Quebec City. From 1988 to 1997, she was co-founder and director of the journal Recherches féministes. Together with Denise Piche, she edited an extensive volume of 18 papers on women and feminism published in 1994 as Women, Feminism and Development: Femmes, feminisme et ddveloppement.

== Early life and education ==
Born in Montreal in 1943, Huguette Dagenais studied anthropology at the Université de Montréal with a bachelor's degree in 1968 and a master's in 1969. She went on to study in Paris, earning a doctorate from the Paris Descartes University in 1976.

== Career ==
In parallel with her role as an academic at the Université Laval, Dagenais carried out extensive research into social gender relationships, feminist analyses and related international developments. She has traveled frequently to the Caribbean, investigating the relationship between women's work and fertility (between 1967 and 1993) and from 1997 she participated in project researching social sciences and humanities research between Canadian and Vietnamese universities. This was followed from 1999 to 2004 by her coordination of a Canadian International Development Research Centre project researching social gender relationships and sustainable development in Vietnam,

In 2002, Dagenais commented that the inclusion of women's studies in Quebec universities presented major difficulties in the late 20th century although the situation had improved in the new millennium. The fragile situation had impacted the study of both science and politics.

In 1986, Dagenais co-founded and became the first coordinator of the multidiciplinaary feminist research group "Groupe de recherche multidisciplinaire féministe" (GREMF) and in 1986 she helped to establish the international journal Recherches féministes which she edited until 1997. In 1994, together with Denise Piche, she edited an extensive volume of 18 papers on women and feminism published as Women, Feminism and Development: Femmes, feminisme et ddveloppement.
