= Émile-Guillaume Léonard =

French historian (1891–1961)

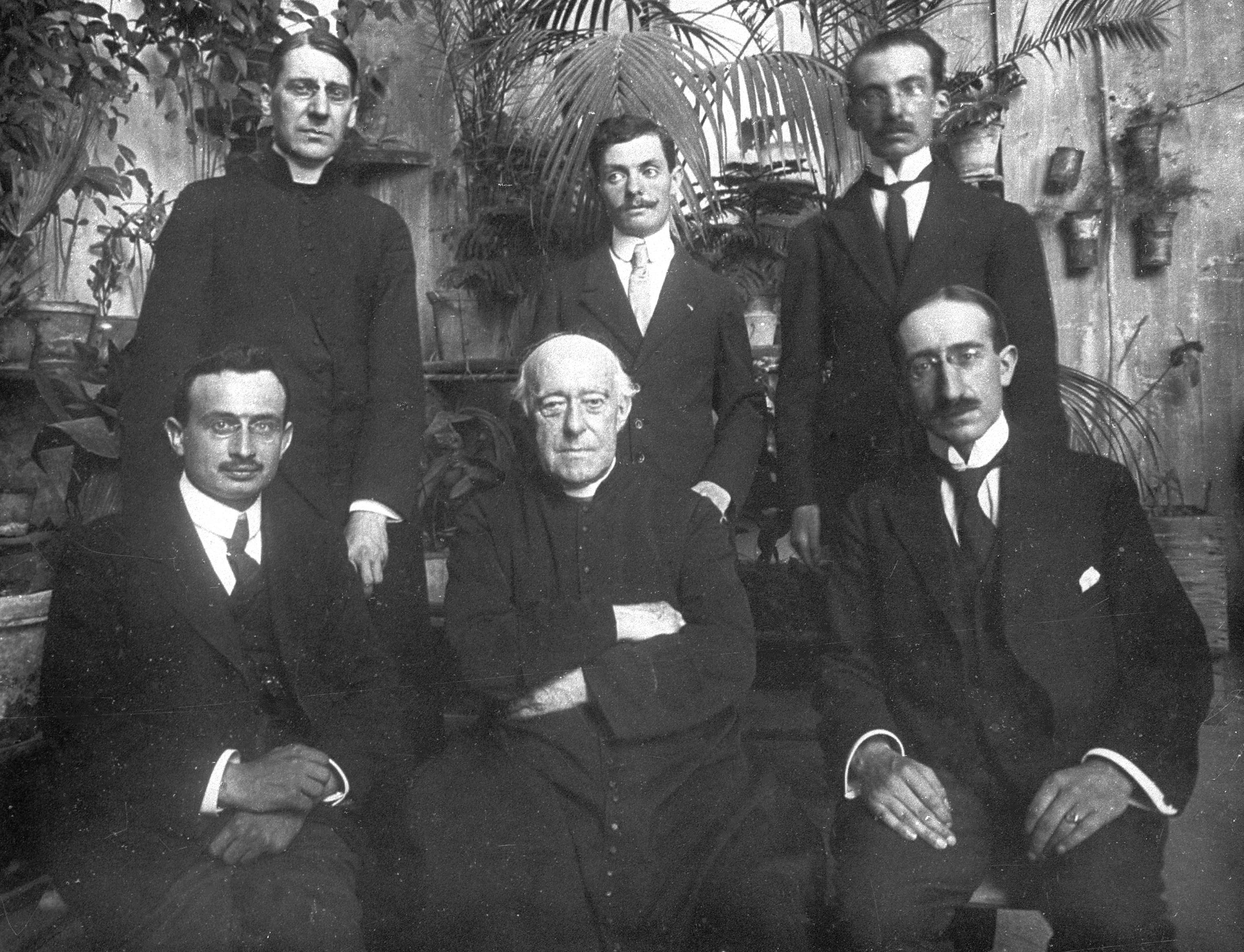
- Émile-Guillaume Léonard (top-right) at the French Academy in Rome in 1919-20
- Born: July 20, 1891
- Died: December 11, 1961 (aged 70)
- Scientific career
- Fields: History
- Institutions: French Academy in Rome; Bibliothèque nationale de France; French Institute in Naples; Aix-Marseille University; University of São Paulo
- Theses: La jeunesse de Jeanne 1re : reine de Naples, comtesse de Provence (1932); Catalogue des actes de Raymond V de Toulouse (1932)

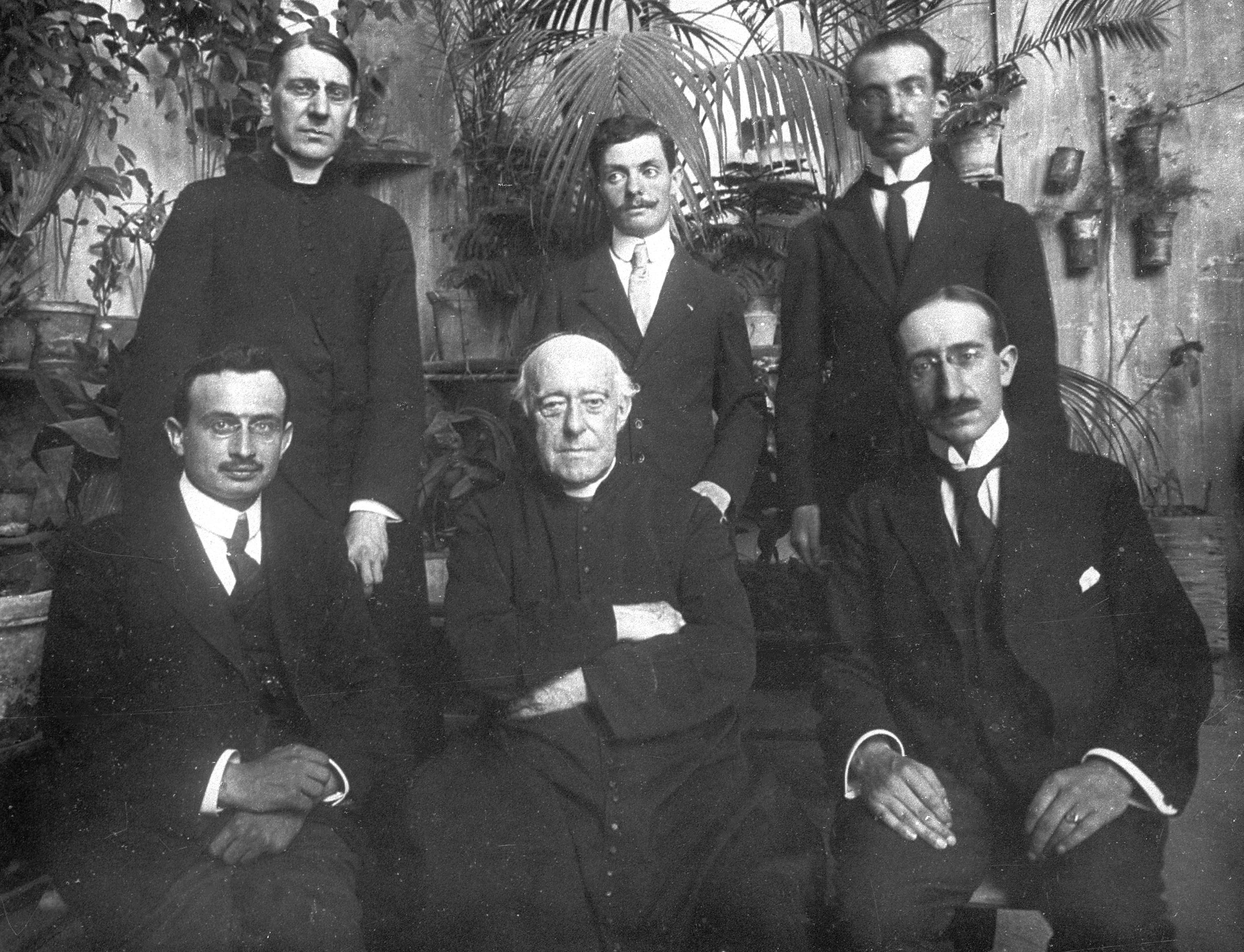

Émile-Guillaume Léonard (20 July 1891 – 11 December 1961) was a French historian. He was director of studies at the École pratique des hautes études and specialist in the history of Protestantism.

== Biography ==
Émile-Guillaume Léonard did his secondary studies at the Lycée in Montpellier then Louis-le-Grand in Paris. He entered the National School of Charters in 1911. His studies were interrupted by the First World War. He was seriously wounded during the Battle of Verdun and suffered serious damage to his arm. He befriended Guillaume Apollinaire, who dedicated his poem "À Nîmes" to him.

In 1919, he defended his thesis at the École des chartes, entitled Study on the chancelleries and diplomacy of the counts of Toulouse (804-1209) and was made a paleographer archivist, major of his promotion.

He was a member of the French School of Rome from 1919 to 1922. The first part of his research career is devoted to medieval Italy during the Angevin presence. He was appointed to the manuscripts department of the National Library (1922-1927) where he was responsible for the catalog of the Protestant collection, and the “Nouveau d'Hozier”, genealogical archives of a noble family, then at the French Institute in Naples (1927-1934).

In 1932, he defended his doctoral thesis in letters devoted to "The youth of Joan I of Naples, queen of Naples, countess of Provence", and a complementary thesis on the "Catalog of acts of the counts of Toulouse". On his return to France, he was first professor of medieval history and the history of Normandy in Caen (1934-1940), then professor of history at the University of Aix-en-Provence (1940- 1948). His research then focused on Protestantism: he published several studies on his village of Aubais during the religious persecutions ordered by Louis XIV [5 ] and more general work on the French Protestantism in the 18th century. In 1948, he was appointed director of studies and holder of the chair in the history of the Reform and Protestantism at the Practical School of High Studies (section of religious sciences), where he succeeded Lucien Febvre who had approached him. for this post. He taught at the University of São Paulo from 1948 to 1950 and of Church History at the Free Faculty of Reformed Theology of Aix-en-Provence. He died in 1961 and Daniel Robert succeeded him at the EPHE.
