= Jean Brunhes =

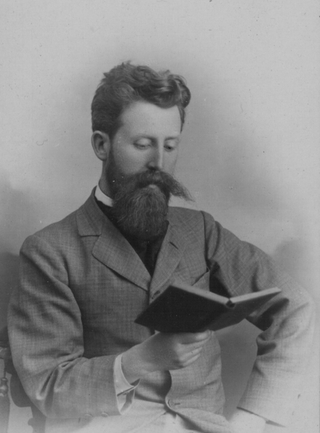
Jean Brunhes reading a book

Jean Brunhes (French pronunciation: [ʒɑ̃ bʁyn], 25 October 1869, Toulouse, France - 25 August 1930, Boulogne-Billancourt) was a French geographer. His most famous book is La géographie humaine (Human Geography). He was the director of The Archives of the Planet, an international photographic project sponsored by Albert Kahn. He was the father of Mariel Jean-Brunhes Delamarre, his daughter and early research partner.

Ruskin et la Bible: pour servir à l'histoire d'une pensée (1901) is a popular book by Jean and Henriette Brunhes.

== Bibliography ==
- Numa Broc, Regards sur la géographie française de la Renaissance à nos jours, Presses universitaires de Perpignan, 1995.
- Musée Albert Kahn, Boulogne, Jean Brunhes autour du monde, regards d'un géographe / regards de la géographie, Vilo, Paris, 1993, 348 p.
- Jean-Louis Tissier, Brunhes (Jean), in Jacques Julliard, Michel Winock (dir.), Dictionnaire des intellectuels français, Paris, Seuil, 1996, p. 195-196.
- Paul Claval, André-Louis Sanguin (éd.), La Géographie française à l'époque classique (1918-1968), L'Harmattan, 1996.
- https://books.google.com/books?id=G9ckCwAAQBAJ&dq=jean+brunhes&pg=PA10
