= Michel Roux (disambiguation) =

Michel Roux (1941–2020) was a French-born chef and restaurateur working in Britain.

Michel Roux may also refer to:

- Michel Roux (Chef, born 1960) (born 1960), French-English chef, nephew of above
- Michel Roux (actor) (1929–2007), French actor
- Michel Roux (baritone) (1924–1998), French opera singer
- Michel Roux-Spitz (1888–1957), French architect
