= Saint-Nazaire =

Saint-Nazaire Saint-Nazère / Saint-Nazaer (Gallo) Sant-Nazer (Breton)
- Subprefecture and commune
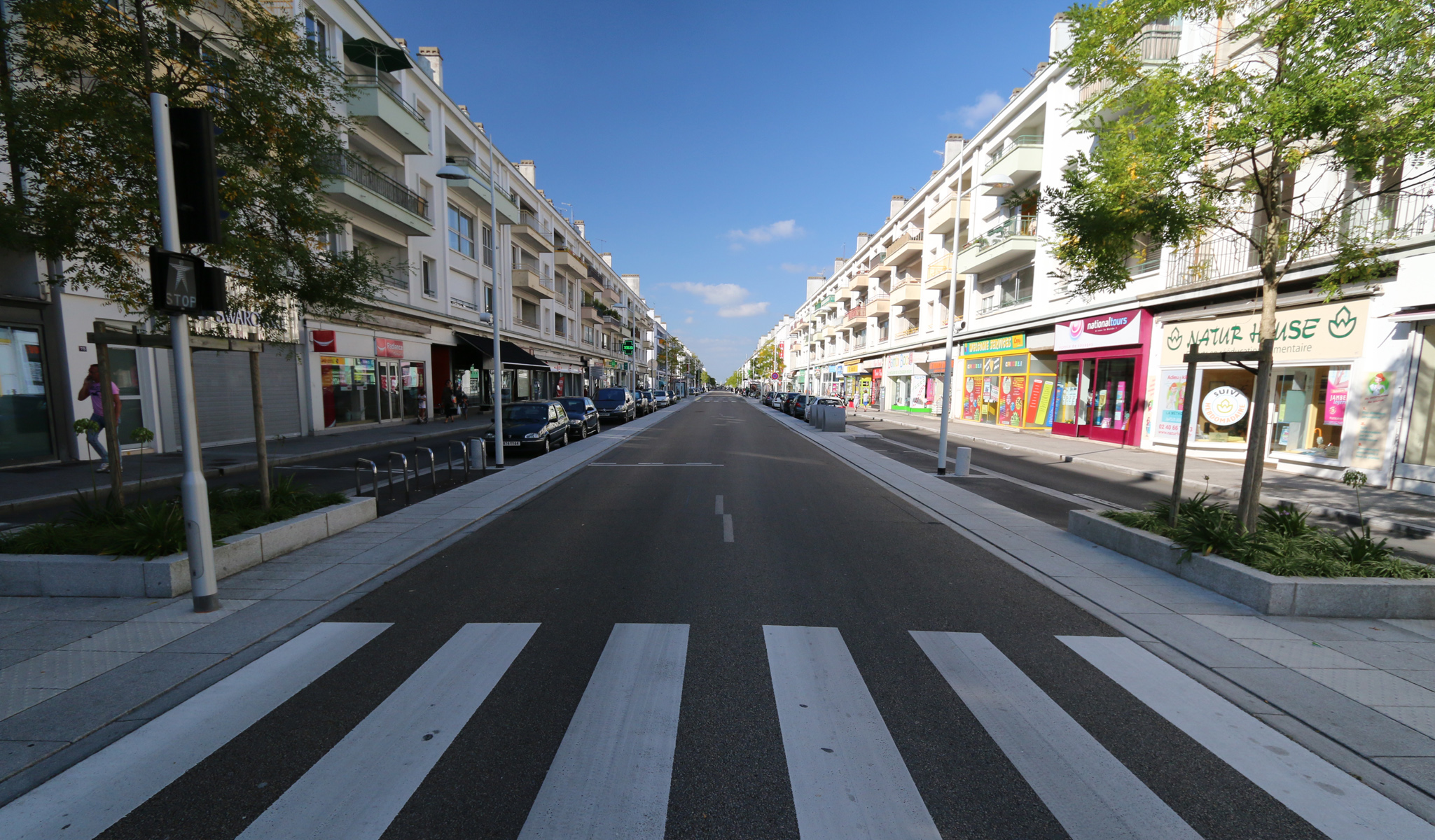
- Avenue de la République

- Flag Coat of arms
- Location of Saint-Nazaire
- Location within France Location within Pays de la Loire
- Coordinates: 47°16′25″N 02°12′50″W
- Country: France
- Region: Pays de la Loire
- Department: Loire-Atlantique
- Arrondissement: Saint-Nazaire
- Canton: Saint-Nazaire-1 and 2
- Intercommunality: CA Région Nazairienne et Estuaire

Government
  - Mayor (2020–2026): David Samzun (PS)
- Area^{1}: 46.79 km^{2} (18.07 sq mi)
  - Urban: 472.2 km^{2} (182.3 sq mi)
  - Metro: 741 km^{2} (286 sq mi)
- Elevation: 6 m (20 ft)
- Highest elevation: 47 m (154 ft)
- Lowest elevation: 0 m (0 ft)
- Population (2023): 74,568
  - Density: 1,594/km^{2} (4,128/sq mi)
  - Urban (2018): 186,760
  - Urban density: 395.5/km^{2} (1,024/sq mi)
  - Metro (2018): 213,675
  - Metro density: 288/km^{2} (747/sq mi)
- Time zone: UTC+01:00 (CET)
  - Summer (DST): UTC+02:00 (CEST)
- INSEE/Postal code: 44184 /44600
- ^{1} French Land Register data, which excludes lakes, ponds, glaciers > 1 km^{2} (0.386 sq mi or 247 acres) and river estuaries.

Saint-Nazaire (French: [sɛ̃ nazɛːʁ]; Breton: Sant-Nazer; Gallo: Saint-Nazère/Saint-Nazaer) is a port town and commune in the Loire-Atlantique department in western France, in traditional Brittany.

The town has a major harbour on the right bank of the Loire estuary, near the Atlantic Ocean. The town is at the south of the second-largest swamp in France, called "la Brière". Given its location, Saint-Nazaire has a long tradition of fishing and shipbuilding. The Chantiers de l'Atlantique, one of the largest shipyards in the world, constructed notable ocean liners such as SS Normandie, SS France, Queen Mary 2 and the cruise ship Symphony of the Seas, the largest passenger ship in the world until 2022.

Saint-Nazaire was a small village until the Industrial Revolution but became a large town in the second half of the 19th century, thanks to the construction of railways and the growth of the seaport. Saint-Nazaire progressively replaced upstream Nantes as the main haven on the Loire estuary.

As a major submarine base for the Kriegsmarine, Saint-Nazaire was subject to a successful British raid in 1942 and was heavily bombed by the Allies until 1945. Being one of the Atlantic pockets, Saint-Nazaire was one of the last territories in Europe to be liberated from German occupation, on 11 May 1945. The town was one of the most damaged in France during World War II.

== History ==
=== Antiquity ===
Archaeologists believe that Saint-Nazaire is built upon the remnants of Corbilo, an Armorican Gaulish city populated by the Namnetes tribe, which (according to the Greek navigator Pytheas) was the second-largest Gaulish city, after Massilia (now Marseille). Archeology suggests that the area has been inhabited since at least the Neolithic period, as evidenced by the presence of monuments like the tumulus of Dissignac, the dolmen located in the centre of the present-day city, and ancient bronzes found in the vicinity.

According to the 15th-century chronicler Alain Bouchart, Brutus of Troy, the mythical ancestor of the Bretons, travelled to Saint-Nazaire to set foot upon the new homeland of his people. Historical accounts note that at the end of the Roman Empire, some Britons colonized the Loire estuary and later the peninsula containing Guérande. The farthest extent of the Breton language in the Loire region is Donges, to the east of Saint-Nazaire.

=== Middle Ages ===
According to the late-6th-century writer Gregory of Tours, the Roman Church sheltered the remains of the martyr Nazarius in a local basilica. According to legend, the Breton chief Waroch II sent an emissary to seize these relics. The plot was foiled when the emissary fractured his skull upon the lintel of the church door. Waroch, interpreting this as a miracle, was deterred and the village thenceforth took the name of Sanctus Nazarius de Sinuario.

After this point, the history of Saint-Nazaire, like much of Europe during the Dark Ages, is not well documented. Battles occurred, such as in 1380 when Jehan d'Ust defended the city in the name of John V, Duke of Brittany (known in France as Jean IV) against the Castilian fleet during the Hundred Years' War. After this time, Saint-Nazaire became the seat of a parish extending from Penhoët to Pornichet, part of the Viscountcy of Saint-Nazaire.

Like the whole of Brittany, Saint-Nazaire formed part of the Duchy of Brittany until 1532, when it was annexed by France. In 1756, a fort was built on the order of the governor of Brittany to protect the town, which by then had 600 inhabitants. Until the French Revolution, Saint-Nazaire belonged to the province of Brittany.

=== 19th century industrialisation ===
At the beginning of the 19th century, the port consisted only of one simple harbour. As the town was so far inland, its main economy was not based on commercial fishing but on its strategic location as the lowest possible navigation point for large ships and on supplying pilots for navigation further up the Loire. In 1800, the parish of Saint-Nazaire had 3,216 inhabitants.

The modern Saint-Nazaire was created by the administration of Napoleon III. The population of 3,216 in 1800 shows its battered history, with a mainly local (Brière), of Lower Brittany (of Morbihan in the Finistère-south), and minor representation from most other areas of France. From this point forward the population of Saint-Nazaire experienced exponential growth, which was reflected in its nickname of "Little Breton California", or "Liverpool of the West".

In 1802, a road was built to develop the port, which extended by 1835 to a breakwater with a navigational lighthouse at its end. The development included new basins for ships to unload to barges that carried goods further up the river. This development moved the town into the area of the city which is now called the district of "Little Morocco". This development made the town the base for the passenger steamships of the Nantes–Saint-Nazaire line, as well as making the town the alternative port for ships which could not access Nantes.

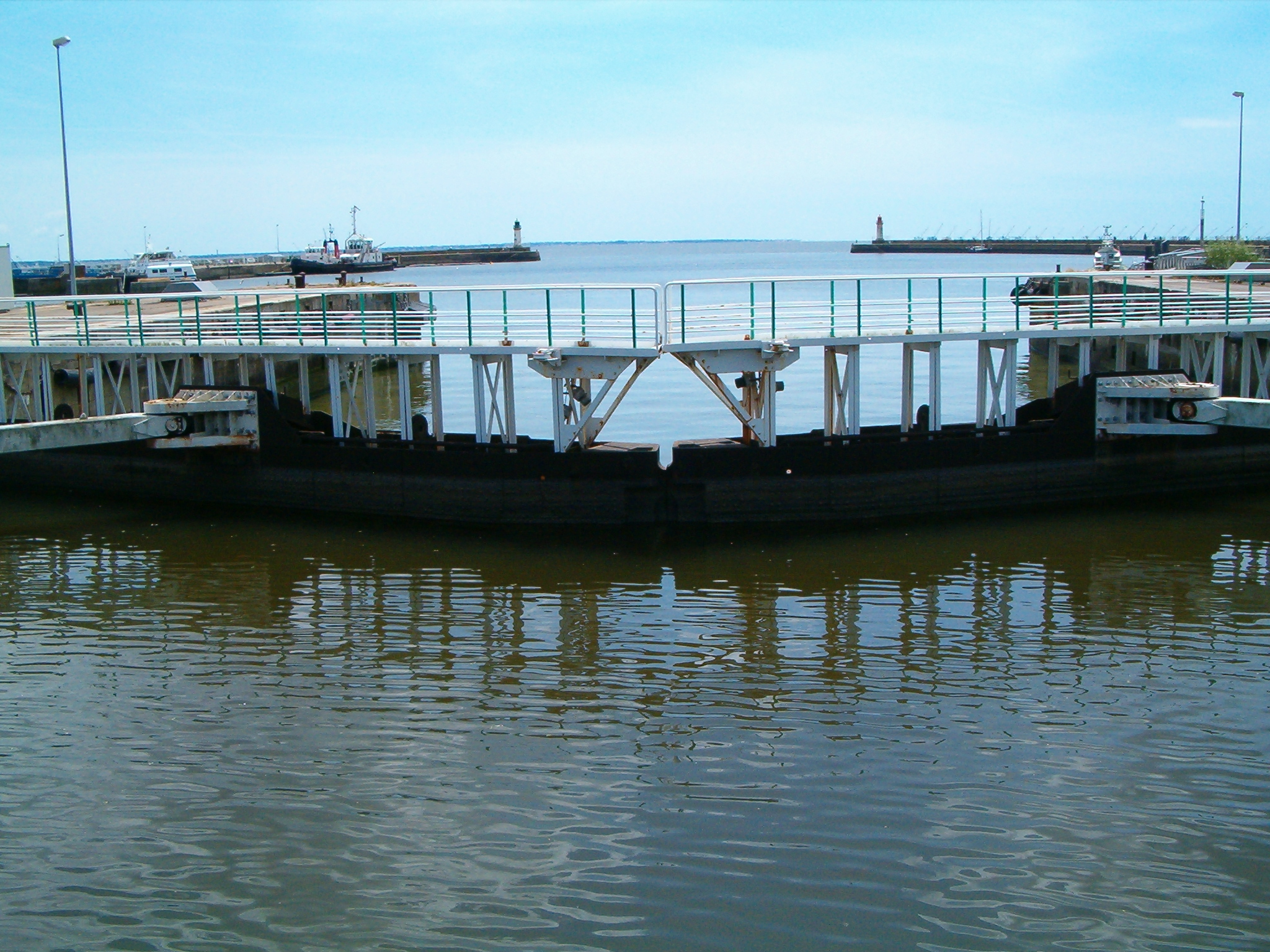
View of the "New Entrance" locks gates to Port Saint-Nazaire towards the Loire River

In 1856, the first wet dock was dug in "Halluard City", making it possible for ships to moor and turn. This led to the construction of the town's first railway connection. In 1857, the Chemin de Fer de Paris à Orléans (railroad company of Orléans) connected Saint-Nazaire to Nantes. In 1862, the first transatlantic telegraph lines were installed from France to South America, coming ashore at Saint-Nazaire. 1862 also saw the construction of major shipbuilding facilities, including those of Chantier Scott, which launched the first French metal-hulled ships. In 1868, Saint-Nazaire became a sub-prefecture of the town of Savenay. A second dock basin was created at Penhoët in 1881, to allow the handling of larger ships, but a lock gate built to access it cut the town in two, thus creating Old Saint-Nazaire and an artificial island called "Little Morocco".

In early 1870, Nantes-born Pierre Waldeck-Rousseau joined the bar in Saint-Nazaire. In September he became, in spite of his youth, secretary to the municipal commission temporarily appointed to carry on the town's business. He organized the National Defense at Saint-Nazaire, and marched out with his contingent, though they saw no active service due to lack of ammunition (their private store having been commandeered by the state). In 1873, he moved to the bar of Rennes, following the establishment of the Third Republic in 1871.

On 30 March 1894, a strike occurred at the forging mills of Trignac in opposition to a reduction of the work force. What had seemed a small dispute escalated after a shooting in Fourmies, resulting in the town getting its national nickname of "Red City". Socialists flocked to the town in defense of the striking workers, joining in the declaration of the "Fusillade de Fourmies".

In 1900, the commune of Pornichet was created by separating from the larger commune of Saint-Nazaire.

=== World War I ===
During World War I, the city became an important debarkment port of Allied troops, particularly in the latter stages for the United States Army. When they entered the war in 1917, they developed the town and port infrastructure, by adding additional drinking water storage ponds for the town's water treatment plants, and a refrigeration terminal to the docks for shipment and storage of meat and dairy products to supply their troops.

However, the presence of legal brothels (Maisons Tolérées) resulted in a diplomatic incident. As a result of strict reformist public health concerns at home, the American Expeditionary Force placed the Maisons Tolérées off limits, resulting in a dispute between the town's brothel owners backed by the mayor, versus the US Army forces. With the dispute escalating, Prime Minister Georges Clemenceau sent a memo to General John Pershing offering a compromise: American medical authorities would control designated brothels operated solely for American soldiers. Pershing passed the proposal to Raymond Fosdick, who on giving it to Secretary of War Newton D. Baker promptly responded: "For God's sake, Raymond, don't show this to the president or he'll stop the war." Only after the signing of the Armistice in November 1918, when the United States Army could no longer plead military necessity as grounds for curtailing leave, did venereal disease rates among United States Army troops rise quickly.

=== Inter-war period ===
The post-war period brought about a period of economic depression for the shipbuilders, who consequently diversified into building seaplanes from 1922. In 1926 the district of Paimbœuf was merged with the district of Saint-Nazaire, thus reinforcing the influence of the city on the south bank of the Loire River.

Although having built SS Paris, between 1913 and 1921, and SS Île de France between 1925 and 1926, as a result of the 1930s Great Depression the French government commissioned a series of state programs to aid national economic activity. The state-owned shipping company Compagnie Générale Transatlantique commissioned the ship builders of Saint-Nazaire to construct a new large passenger ship, which as a result between 1928 and 1934 created the Albert Caquot–engineered the Louis Joubert dry dock – at 1,200 m × 60 m (3,940 ft × 200 ft), the largest of its kind in the world at the time – necessary to be able to accommodate the construction of SS Normandie. In 1932, the Saint-Nazaire casino went bankrupt and was resold to the town of Nantes: the site was redeveloped in 1935 as the first home of the current Saint-Louis school.

As a result of the national general strike of June 1936, to ensure completion of the nationally prestigious project SS Normandie, the government nationalised the various private shipyards into one state-owned entity, the 1861-founded Chantiers de l'Atlantique.

=== World War II ===
After the invasion of Poland by Nazi Germany's Wehrmacht army at the start of World War II, the combined forces of the French Army and the British Expeditionary Force failed to hold the oncoming onslaught. As part of Operation Aerial, Saint-Nazaire, like Dunkirk, became an evacuation point to England for the British, with those embarking including the writer John Renshaw Starr.

==== Sinking of the Lancastria ====
On 17 June 1940 an estimated 9,000 British Army soldiers were embarked aboard the Clyde-built cruise liner, later converted to troopship, RMS Lancastria, which was attacked and sunk by German Junkers Ju 88 bombers, mainly from Kampfgeschwader 30, taking with her around 4,000 victims. This is the worst disaster in British maritime history and the worst loss of life for British forces in the whole of World War II. Winston Churchill banned all news coverage of the disaster on learning of it and it remains largely forgotten by history. A Lancastria memorial is located near the U-boat pens in Saint-Nazaire.

==== Miracle of Saint-Nazaire ====
The ball turret gunner of an American B-17F bomber fell 20,000 ft (6,100 m) onto the glass roof of the railway station, even though his parachute had been destroyed by German flak while still in his plane. The US airman, Alan Magee, survived the fall. A German military surgeon was able to save his nearly severed arm. The airman credited his survival to a prayer to God as he recovered consciousness during his fall.

==== U-boat pens ====
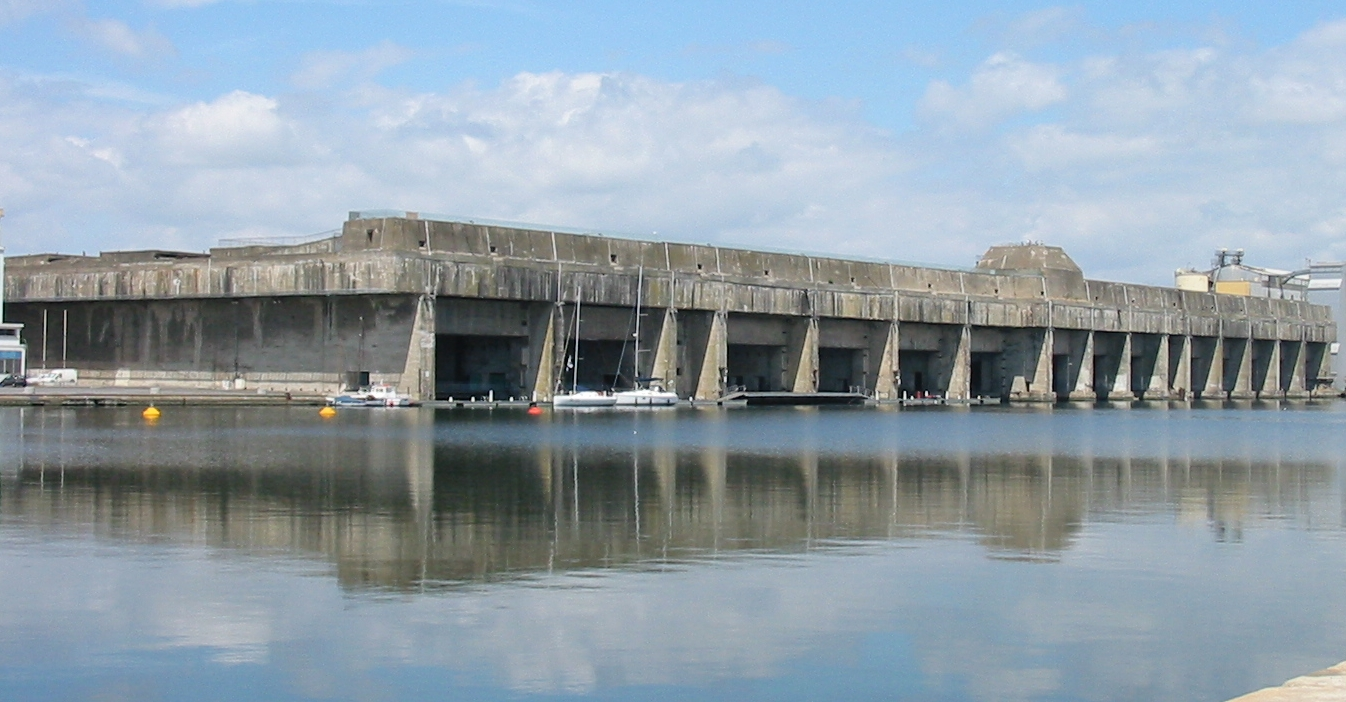
Modern day view of the Kriegsmarine Saint-Nazaire submarine base 47°16′32″N 2°12′08″W

Following the surrender of France to German forces later in June 1940, the port immediately became a base of operations for the Kriegsmarine and was as such the target of Allied operations. A heavily fortified U-boat Saint-Nazaire submarine base was built by Organisation Todt shortly after occupation, with a 9 m-thick (30 ft) concrete ceiling capable of withstanding almost any bomb in use at the time.

The base provided a home during the war to many of the best-known U-boat staff, including:

- Commander Georg-Wilhelm Schulz – transferred the 6th U-boat Flotilla from Danzig to the port in February 1942, where it became a combat flotilla.
- Kapitänleutnant Carl Emmermann – took command of 6th U-boat Flotilla over from Schulz in November 1942, until it left Saint-Nazaire for Norway in August 1944.
- Lieutenant Commander Herbert Schultze – second in command of 7th U-boat Flotilla from September 1940.

The base stands today as its extremely sturdy construction makes demolition uneconomical. The base is now used by cafes, a bar and on the roof is an exhibition about Saint-Nazaire.

==== St Nazaire Raid ====
The huge Joubert drydock built for SS Normandie was the only port on the Atlantic capable of servicing the German battleships Bismarck and Tirpitz. This made the port strategically important to both the Axis powers and the Allies during World War II. After Operation Rheinübung on 18–27 May 1941, which resulted in the sinking of HMS Hood and the sinking of Bismarck, the need for the Allies to take the Joubert dry dock out of operation was increased. On 28 March 1942, a force of 611 British Commandos and the Royal Navy launched the St Nazaire Raid against the shipyards of Saint-Nazaire, codenamed Operation Chariot. An obsolete American-built destroyer HMS Campbeltown was used as a ram-ship loaded with explosives. It and the Commandos succeeded in destroying the gates and machinery of the Joubert drydock, preventing its further use by the Germans during the war. Of the 600+ navy and commando personnel, 220 returned, half were wounded. Five Victoria Crosses and 69 other decorations were awarded. The Joubert dry dock was not brought back into operation until 1948.

==== After Operation Chariot ====
The U-boat threat to supply convoys across the Atlantic made Saint-Nazaire a constant target of Allied air forces, in the face of determined Luftwaffe fighter opposition to raids by United States Army Air Forces Eighth Air Force bombers. On 3 January 1943 Colonel Curtis LeMay led 85 Boeing B-17 Flying Fortresses of the 1st Bombardment Wing against the U-boat pens at Saint-Nazaire, on the Eighth Air Force's sixth raid against the facility. LeMay also introduced the combat box defensive formation, echeloning three-plane elements within a squadron, and squadrons within a group, to concentrate defensive firepower against fighter opposition. Only 76 aircraft found and hit the target, and during the mission seven bombers were shot down and 47 damaged.

As a result of the raid, on 14 January 1943 under directive (S.46239/?? A.C.A.S. Ops), the Allies implemented incendiary bomb tactics against U-boat pens, under the Area bombing directive. To minimize civilian casualties during air attacks, the Allies devised a plan to force an evacuation of the town. For three days in 1943, British Royal Air Force and American aircraft dropped scores of leaflets warning the population of a planned fire-bombing raid. At the end of the third day, the raid came and burned the entire city to the ground. Casualties were light as most of the civilians had heeded the warning and fled to the safety of the countryside but after that point, except for the self-contained U-boat base, Saint-Nazaire remained abandoned until the end of the war.

After D-day and the liberation of most of France in 1944, German troops in Saint-Nazaire's submarine base refused to surrender, and they holed up (as did their counterparts in the La Rochelle and Lorient bases). Since the Germans could no longer conduct major submarine operations from the bases without a supply line, the SHAEF commander, U.S. General Dwight D. Eisenhower decided to simply bypass these ports, and the Allied armies focused their resources on the invasion of Germany. Saint-Nazaire and the other two German "pockets" remained under German control until after the last day of the war in Europe, 8 May 1945.

=== After World War II ===
The Hôtel de Ville

The town of St. Nazaire was rebuilt in the late 1940s and 1950s in a minimalist functional style. One of the last of these buildings to be completed was the Hôtel de Ville which was completed in February 1960.

The submarine base was used by the French Navy from 1945 to 1948. It then came under the control of various chemical companies and shipbuilders. As of 2016, the French diesel submarine Espadon is moored within the U-boat pens. Tours of the submarine are available to the public.

After the construction of SS France in 1961, the last Compagnie Générale Transatlantique liner and the subsequent closure of the Suez Canal, Chantiers de l'Atlantique began building large oil tankers, including Batillus, Bellamya, Pierre Guillaumat and Prairial. A new dry dock (Basin C) was planned for the construction of tankers over 1,000,000 tonnes but this fell through with the reopening of the Suez Canal. RMS Queen Mary 2 was constructed at Chantiers de l'Atlantique in 2003.

== Geography ==
The town of Saint-Nazaire is located on the north bank of the Loire estuary (its territory includes the tip of Chémoulin which marks the end of the estuary), 50 km west of Nantes. It is near the marshes of Brière, an important regional natural park with many animal and plant species, the second largest wetland in France after the Camargue.

According to INSEE, Saint-Nazaire is the commune-center of an urban unit (commonly: agglomeration) which counted 186,760 inhabitants in 2018, gathering 17 communes of the Loire estuary. This unit is the urban center of the urban area of Saint-Nazaire (24 communes), which had 213,675 inhabitants in 2018 and extending over Brière and almost all of the Guérande peninsula. The eastern part of the town is on the alluvial terrain between the Brière and the Loire estuary. The western part, more extensive, corresponds to the extension of the hillside of Guérande: the relief is hilly and of higher altitude, where one finds a granite and metamorphic base. Geologically, Saint-Nazaire is located in the Armorican massif.

== Climate ==
In close proximity to the Atlantic Ocean, the climate of Saint-Nazaire is, as with the rest of the Loire-Atlantique, of temperate oceanic type, with Cfb designation in Köppen climate classification. This climate is very much influenced by the Loire estuary. The winters are mild, and summer is warm. Snowfall is rare, but rain is frequent (116 days a year with precipitation) but not very intense, the annual rainfall being 792 mm. Precipitation is however relatively variable from one year to the next. The sunshine is 1,892.6 hours a year.

Saint-Nazaire receives mainly southwestern sector winds related to the Atlantic depressions and northeastern sector winds when the weather is more stable. The annual average wind speed is 4.2 m / s and there are 61.7 days per year of strong wind.

Climate data for Saint Nazaire (1991-2020, extremes since 1962)Coordinates:47.32°N 2.17°W
Month	Jan	Feb	Mar	Apr	May	Jun	Jul	Aug	Sep	Oct	Nov	Dec	Year
Record high °C (°F)	16.8 (62.2)	20.7 (69.3)	24.0 (75.2)	27.5 (81.5)	31.2 (88.2)	37.7 (99.9)	41.0 (105.8)	38.4 (101.1)	33.4 (92.1)	29.4 (84.9)	20.9 (69.6)	16.9 (62.4)	41.0 (105.8)
Mean daily maximum °C (°F)	9.5 (49.1)	10.4 (50.7)	13.2 (55.8)	15.8 (60.4)	19.2 (66.6)	22.5 (72.5)	24.4 (75.9)	24.5 (76.1)	21.9 (71.4)	17.4 (63.3)	13.1 (55.6)	10.2 (50.4)	16.8 (62.2)
Daily mean °C (°F)	6.6 (43.9)	6.9 (44.4)	9.1 (48.4)	11.2 (52.2)	14.5 (58.1)	17.5 (63.5)	19.3 (66.7)	19.2 (66.6)	16.7 (62.1)	13.5 (56.3)	9.6 (49.3)	7.1 (44.8)	12.6 (54.7)
Mean daily minimum °C (°F)	3.7 (38.7)	3.4 (38.1)	5.1 (41.2)	6.6 (43.9)	9.8 (49.6)	12.5 (54.5)	14.1 (57.4)	13.9 (57.0)	11.4 (52.5)	9.5 (49.1)	6.1 (43.0)	4.0 (39.2)	8.3 (46.9)
Record low °C (°F)	−13.8 (7.2)	−13.7 (7.3)	−9.4 (15.1)	−3.0 (26.6)	−0.9 (30.4)	2.0 (35.6)	6.5 (43.7)	4.7 (40.5)	1.1 (34.0)	−5.9 (21.4)	−7.9 (17.8)	−10.6 (12.9)	−13.8 (7.2)
Average precipitation mm (inches)	87.7 (3.45)	68.3 (2.69)	58.6 (2.31)	56.6 (2.23)	54.9 (2.16)	40.0 (1.57)	38.6 (1.52)	44.1 (1.74)	63.4 (2.50)	87.7 (3.45)	95.4 (3.76)	96.7 (3.81)	792.0 (31.18)
Average precipitation days (≥ 1.0 mm)	12.5	10.2	9.3	9.2	8.9	7.6	7.0	6.5	7.9	11.4	12.8	13.0	116.2
Mean monthly sunshine hours	72.8	102.0	148.7	174.5	206.8	232.9	233.1	233.9	197.7	127.9	89.8	72.4	1,892.6
Source: Infoclimat

== Education ==
=== Schools ===
The primary schools of Saint-Nazaire (Carnot, Jean-Jaurès, Lamartine, Jules Ferry, Ferdinand Bush, Boncourt, etc.) educate nearly 8,000 pupils in 30 school complexes. The junior schools have nearly 7,000 pupils in 12 colleges: public colleges Albert Vinçon; Pierre Norange; Manon Roland; Jean de Neyman; Jean Moulin, accommodate around 1,350 pupils each. Private colleges include: Saint-Louis (1,000 pupils, boarding school; historically a college for boys), Sainte-Therese (historically a college for girls).

The high schools educate 6,000 pupils into 11 lycées, with the mainstream education and technical school Aristide Briand having some 2,500 pupils, one of the largest lycée of France; an experimental lycée, public lycée managed jointly by the teachers and the pupils; the private lycée of Saint-Louis mainstream education; the hotel private lycée Sainte-Anne; the private of mainstream education and technological college Our-Lady-in Espérance. The Cité Scolaire of Saint-Nazaire is one of largest of France, with nearly 4,000 high-school pupils.

=== University ===
The University of Saint-Nazaire is a college of the University of Nantes, the second largest university in France with approximately 35,000 students, including nearly 5,000 on the university campus of Saint-Nazaire.

== Transport ==
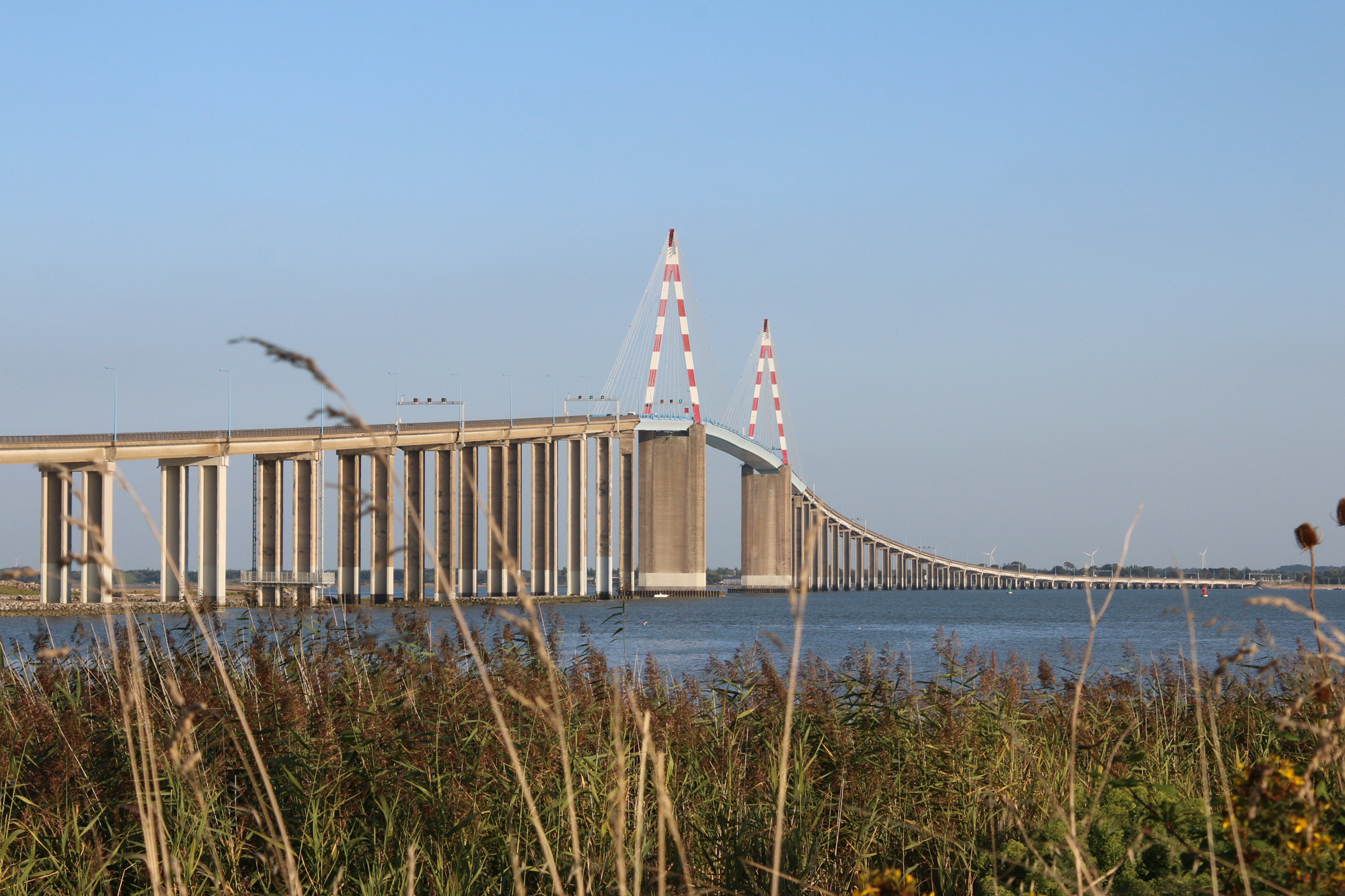
The Pont de Saint-Nazaire, which crosses the Loire

The Route nationale N165/N161 (E60 route) connects Saint-Nazaire to Nantes and Rennes via the Pont de Saint-Nazaire, which crosses the Loire. Paris is then accessed via the A10/A11 in Nantes. Valves, Lorient, Quimper and Brest are accessed via the N165.

A project to review a second crossing of the Loire between Nantes and Saint Nazaire is being considered, planned to be constructed and operational by 2025.

=== Railway ===
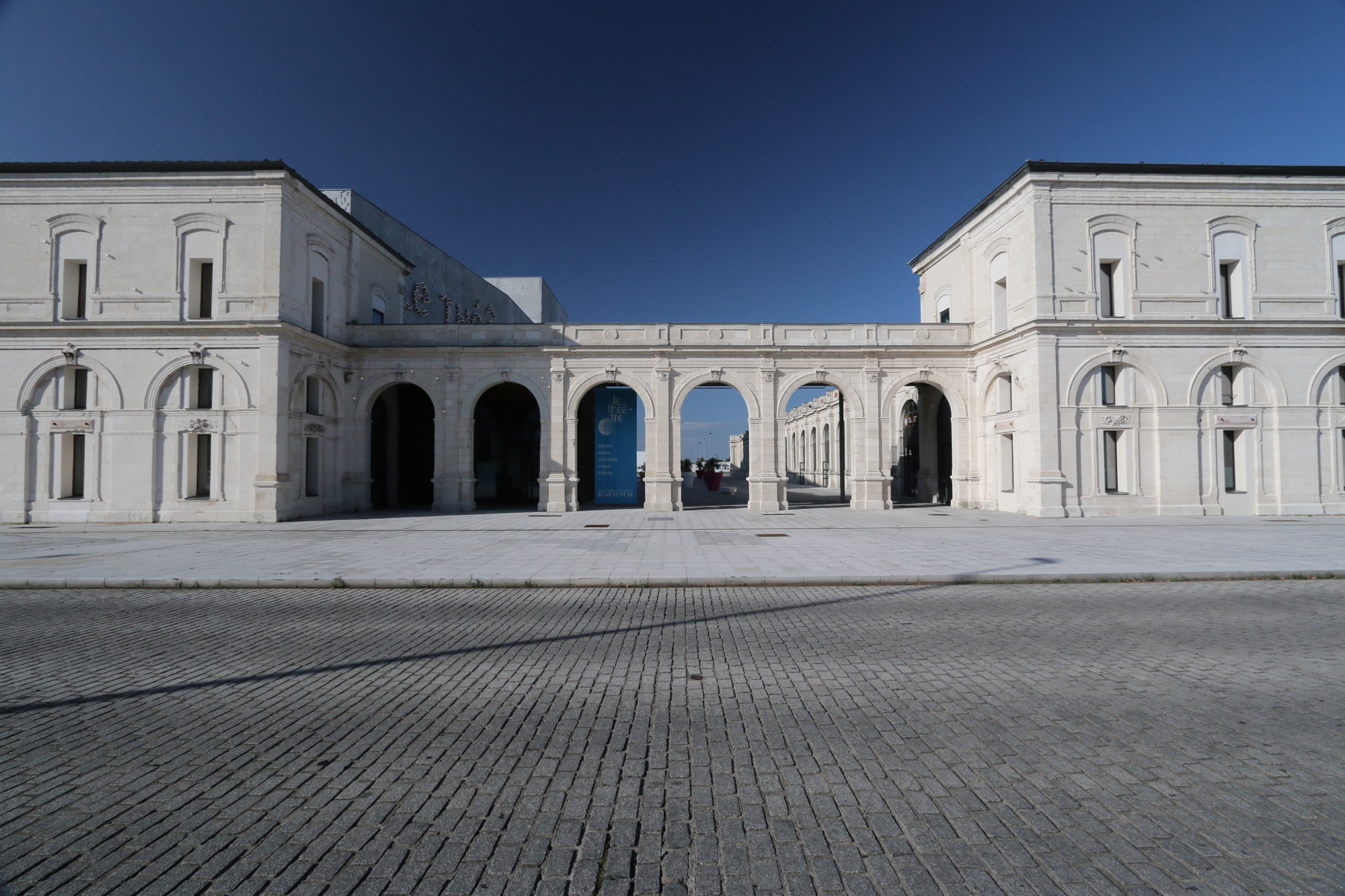
The old Saint-Nazaire station building

Saint-Nazaire railway station is served by both the TGV and regional trains and buses of the TER Pays de la Loire. TGV (high speed train) connection to Paris, Lyon, Marseille, Lille, and Strasbourg, with trains to Paris via the LGV Atlantique taking just over 2 hours. TER Pays de la Loire provides links to Nantes, Angers, Le Mans, La Roche sur Yon, and other regional cities and towns.

=== Air travel ===
Saint-Nazaire airport is located 5 km (3 mi) south-east of Saint-Nazaire, in the commune of Montoir-de-Bretagne. It has an annual capacity of approximately 150,000 passengers, and is the operational and maintenance base for Eagle Aviation France.

International travel is via Nantes Atlantique Airport, the biggest airport in western France, linking with several French and European cities as well as Montreal in Canada (seasonally) and some cities in North Africa. A new airport was planned that was to be situated 30 km (19 mi) to the north-west of Nantes in the commune of Notre-Dame-des-Landes. Called Aéroport du Grand Ouest, it was officially cancelled in 2018.

== Economy ==
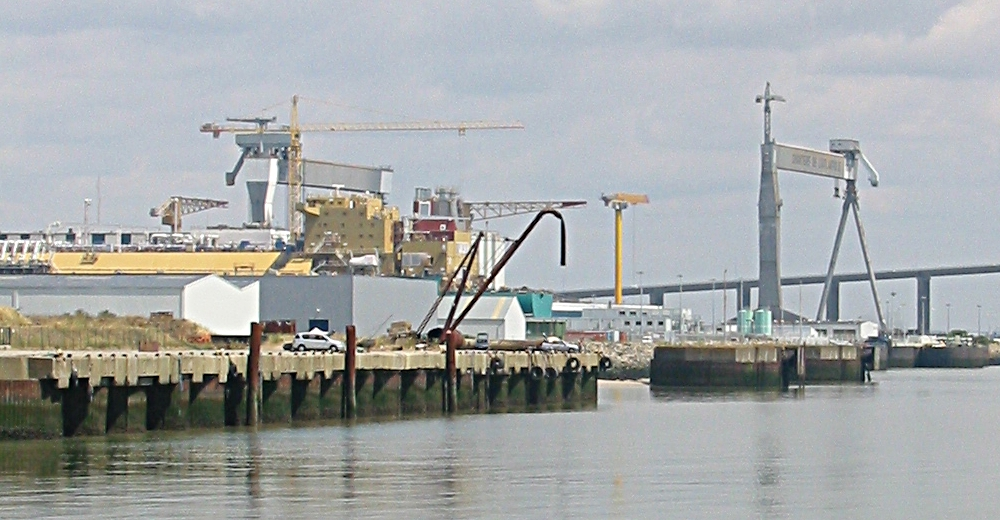
The shipyards of Chantiers de l'Atlantique, Saint-Nazaire

The economy of the city is founded on the activity of the port, including export of manufactured goods but also on services. Commercial fishing has almost completely disappeared with just a small fleet of fisheries and fishing vessels.

Saint-Nazaire suffered heavily from the downsizing of shipbuilding activity in western Europe in the 1960s and 1970s, after the completion of the national passenger liner, SS France. For a long time in the 1980s, Saint-Nazaire remained an economically depressed area with unemployment rates above 20%. Today, the local economy is more diversified and its situation is more in line with that of France as a whole. The major industries are:

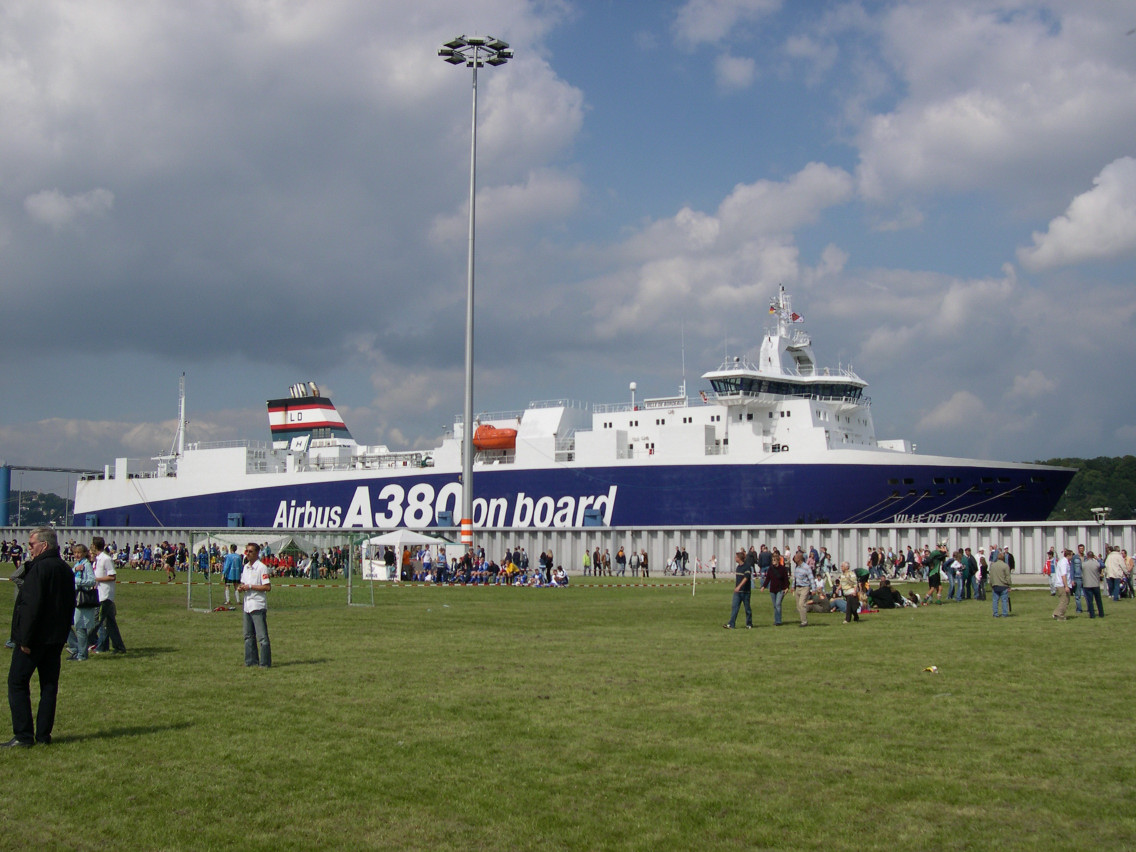
Airbus A380 transporter ship Ville de Bordeaux

- Shipyard – having previously concentrated on both naval and cargo ship construction, Chantiers de l'Atlantique has completed a successful reconversion to cruise ship building and is now one of the world leaders in this sector. Purchased by Aker Yards, the Cunard Line's new flagship, RMS Queen Mary 2, was built in Saint-Nazaire.
- Airbus – Saint-Nazaire is one of the European centers of Airbus, responsible for the fitting out of aircraft fuselage sections. Originally a factory built for SNCASO, it is located at Penhoët, immediate north of the sites of Chantiers de l'Atlantique. An additional facility was built in Gron in 1980. For the Airbus A380, the Airbus Roll-on/roll-off (RORO) ship Ville de Bordeaux brings fuselage sections from Hamburg, (Germany) for larger, assembled sections, some of which include the nose. The ship then unloads these sections plus wings from Filton, Bristol and Broughton in North Wales at Bordeaux. From there, the A380 parts are transported by barge to Langon, Gironde, and by oversize road convoys to the assembly hall in Toulouse. New wider roads, canal systems and barges were developed to deliver the A380 parts. After assembly, the aircraft are flown to Hamburg, XFW to be furnished and painted.
- Aeronautical engineering – Famat, a joint-venture company between Snecma and General Electric, has a factory in Saint-Nazaire. Employing approximately 450 people, Famat specializes in the manufacture of structural elements for turbojets.
- Mechanical engineering – SEMT Pielstick, a manufacturer of diesel engines intended for naval and railway applications and for electrical production. Now part of MAN B&W Diesel, the SEMT Pielstick factory employed in 2006 670 people in Saint-Nazaire.

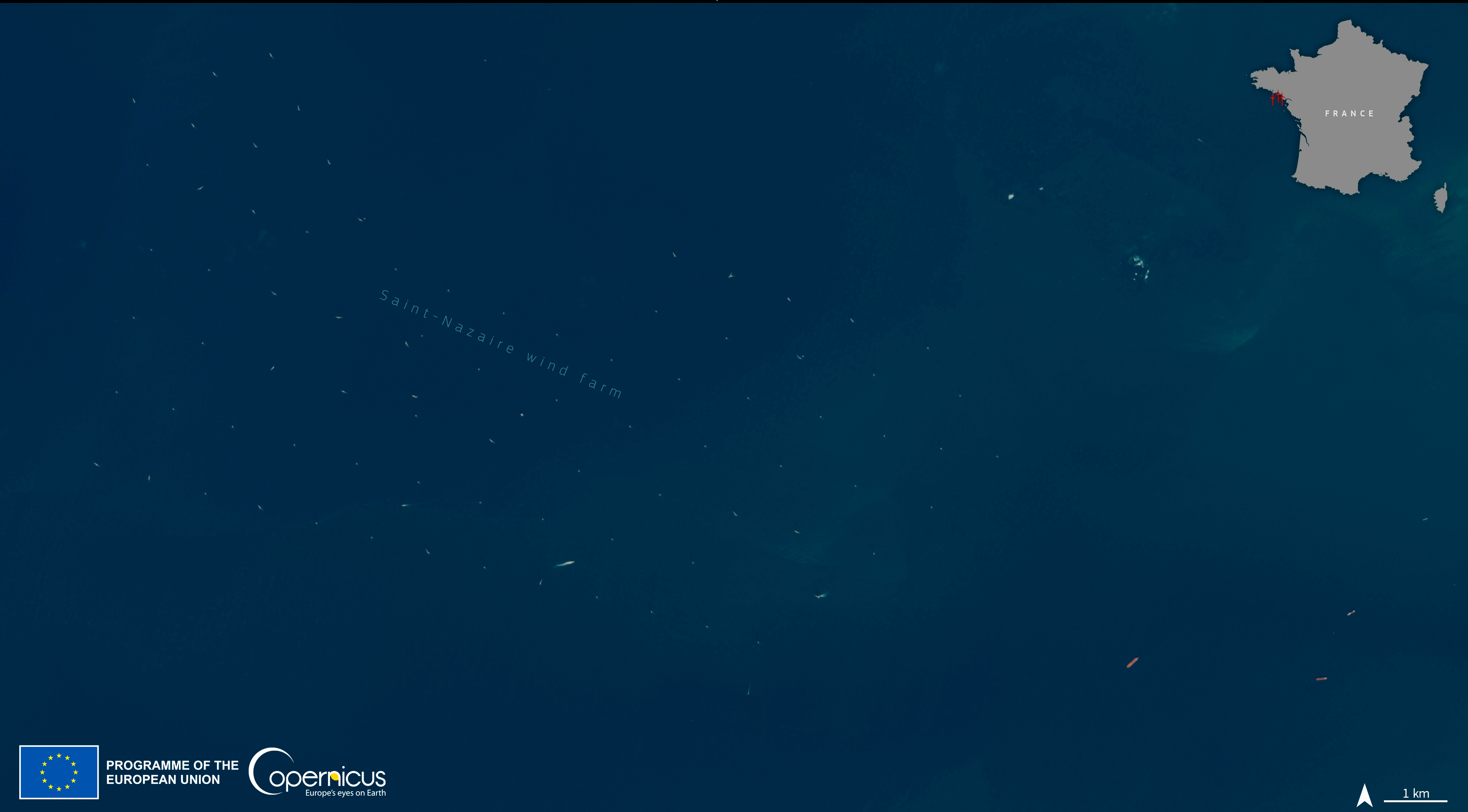
The Saint-Nazaire wind farm from space

- Port – the primary French port on the Atlantic coast. Now busier than its rival Nantes, it is managed by the Port Authority of Nantes-Saint-Nazaire. The port terminal handles high volumes of food products, and methane, and oil company Elf de Donges and many other industries.

Saint Nazaire hosts the first French offshore wind farm with 80 wind turbines that will produce enough power to cover consumptions of around 700,000 people.

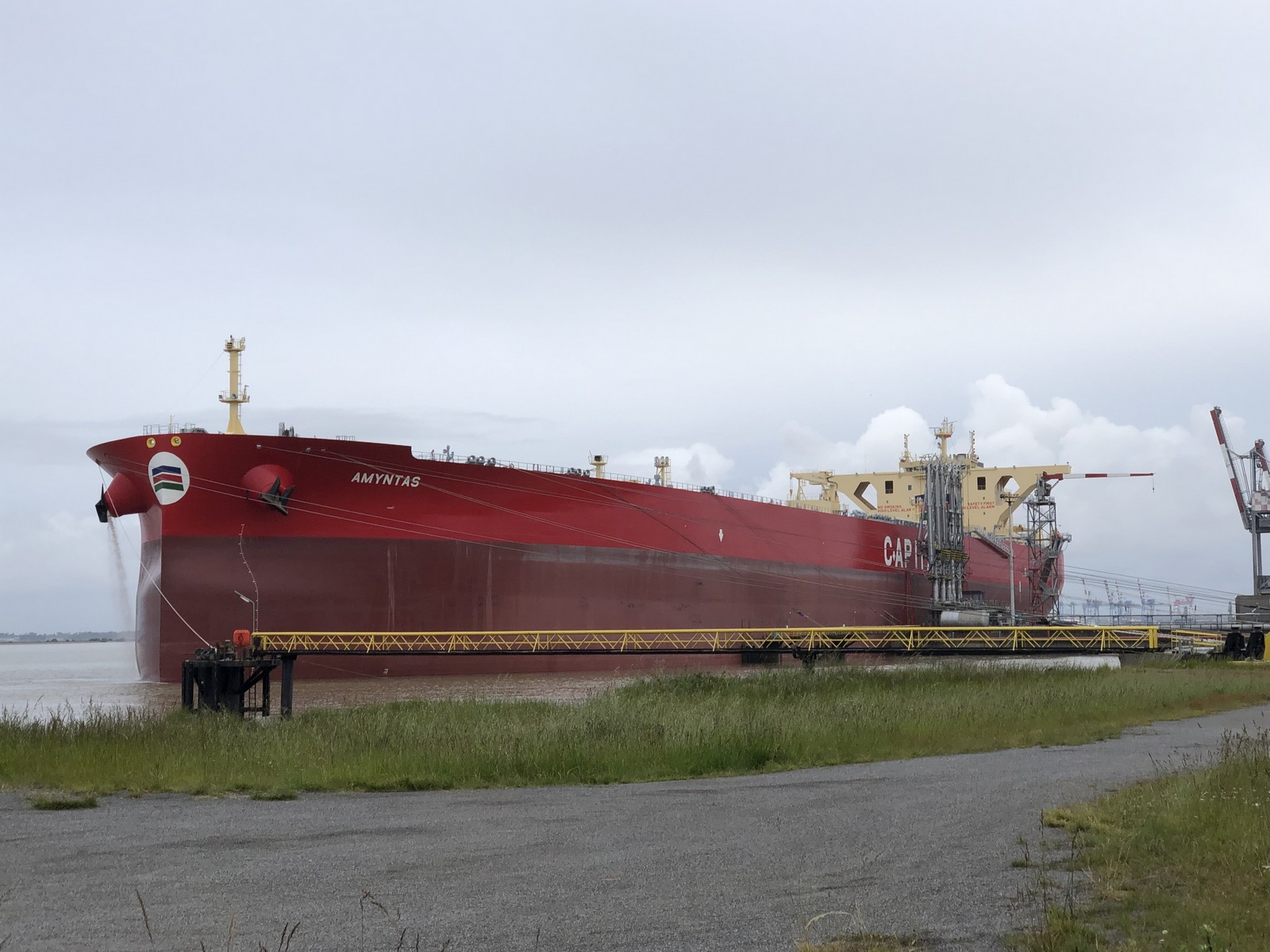
AMYNTAS, new VLCC inaugurated in February 2019 berthing at Donges / Saint-Nazaire (France)

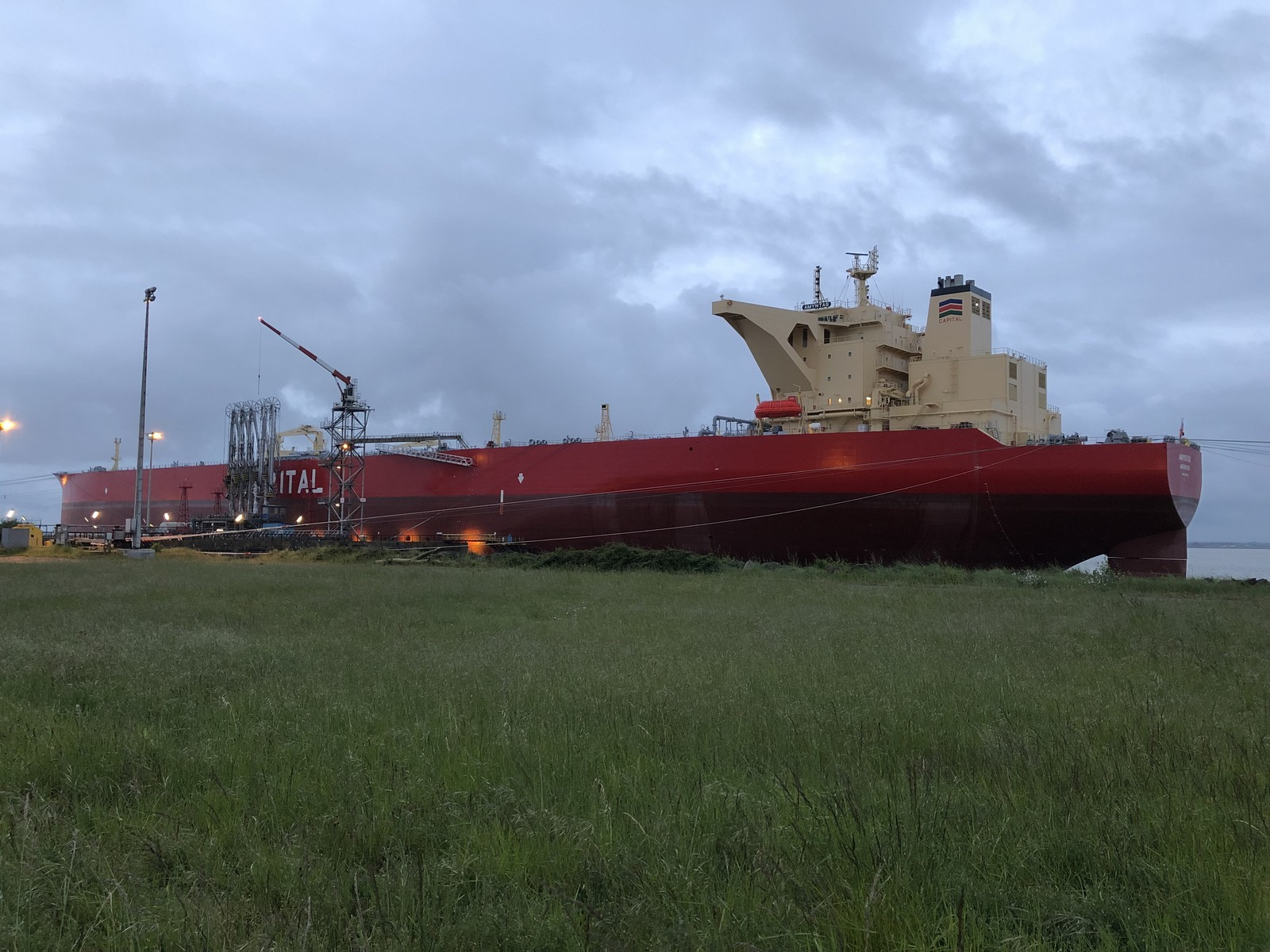
Rear view of the AMYNTAS

== International relations ==
=== Twin towns – sister cities ===
Saint-Nazaire is twinned with:

- Avilés, Spain
- Saarlouis, Germany, since 1969
- Sunderland, England, United Kingdom, since 1953

=== Cooperation agreements ===
- Kribi, Cameroon
- Mahdia, Tunisia

== Cultural references ==
- 1943 British film Tomorrow We Live, directed by George King, and starring John Clements, Godfrey Tearle, Greta Gynt, Hugh Sinclair and Yvonne Arnaud
- In the book of Das Boot Saint-Nazaire was the base used in the novel. The film changed the location to La Rochelle because its appearance had not changed to such a large degree in the years following World War II.
- Saint-Nazaire, under the Arabicized name "Nsara", is the setting for Book Nine in Kim Stanley Robinson's 2002 alternate-history novel The Years of Rice and Salt.
- In the Franco-Canadian CGI Cartoon Skyland, Saint Nazaire is a name of a pirate flagship participating in a losing rebellion trying to overthrow a corrupt military dictatorship.
- The video game Medal of Honor: European Assault opens with the British raid on St. Nazaire.
- Cyllage City from the Game Pokémon X & Y is based on Saint-Nazaire.
- Saint-Nazaire is the title of a song from American alternative rock band Pixies on the album Beneath the Eyrie.
- The song, "Mademoiselle from Armentières", has the lines, "Mademoiselle from Saint-Nazaire:/She never heard of underwear."

== People from Saint-Nazaire ==
- René-Yves Creston (1898–1964), artist, ethnologist, resister and Breton nationalist, founder of the artistic movement and social Art Seiz Breur
- Odette du Puigaudeau (1894–1991), ethnologist
- Fernand Guériff (1914–1994), scholar, type-setter, historian, journalist devoted mainly to the soil of the peninsula guérandaise 5
- Yann Goulet (1914–1999), sculptor, Breton nationalist and war-time collaborationist with Nazi Germany who headed the Breton Bagadou Stourm militia. He later took Irish citizenship and became professor of sculpture at the Royal Hibernian Academy
- Marie Léra (1864-1958), journalist, novelist, translator
- Roger Lévêque (5 December 1920 – 30 June 2002), a professional road racing cyclist from 1946 to 1953
- Colonel Moutarde (born 1968), illustrator
- Stéphane Hoffmann (born 1958), writer
- Tony Heurtebis (15 January 1975), football goalkeeper who played for FC Nantes Atlantique.
- Pierre R. Graham (born 1922), 6th US ambassador to Burkina Faso
- Sandra Gomis (born 1983), athlete
- Bryan Coquard (born 1992), Professional Cyclist for Team Europcar – 2012 Olympic Silver medalist
- Serge (born 2005), llama that became an internet meme after being kidnapped by five drunk students in November 2013
- Vincent Talio (born 1981), footballer

== Demographics ==
Historical population

Year	Pop.	±% p.a.
1793	3,381	—
1800	3,316	−0.28%
1806	3,303	−0.07%
1821	3,204	−0.20%
1831	3,789	+1.69%
1841	3,771	−0.05%
1846	4,145	+1.91%
1851	5,318	+5.11%
1856	5,743	+1.55%
1861	10,845	+13.56%
1866	18,896	+11.74%
1872	17,066	−1.68%

Year	Pop.	±% p.a.
1876	18,300	+1.76%
1881	19,626	+1.41%
1886	25,575	+5.44%
1891	30,935	+3.88%
1896	30,813	−0.08%
1901	35,813	+3.05%
1906	35,762	−0.03%
1911	38,267	+1.36%
1921	41,631	+0.85%
1926	39,411	−1.09%
1931	40,488	+0.54%
1936	43,281	+1.34%

Year	Pop.	±% p.a.
1946	11,802	−12.19%
1954	39,350	+16.24%
1962	58,286	+5.03%
1968	63,289	+1.38%
1975	69,251	+1.29%
1982	68,348	−0.19%
1990	64,812	−0.66%
1999	65,874	+0.18%
2007	68,522	+0.49%
2012	67,940	−0.17%
2017	69,993	+0.60%
2023	74,568	+1.06%

Source: EHESS and INSEE

== Breton language ==
In 2008, 0.41% of the children attended bilingual primary schools.

== See also ==
- Port of Saint-Nazaire
- Communes of the Loire-Atlantique department
- Parc naturel régional de Brière
