= Saint-Nazaire Bridge =

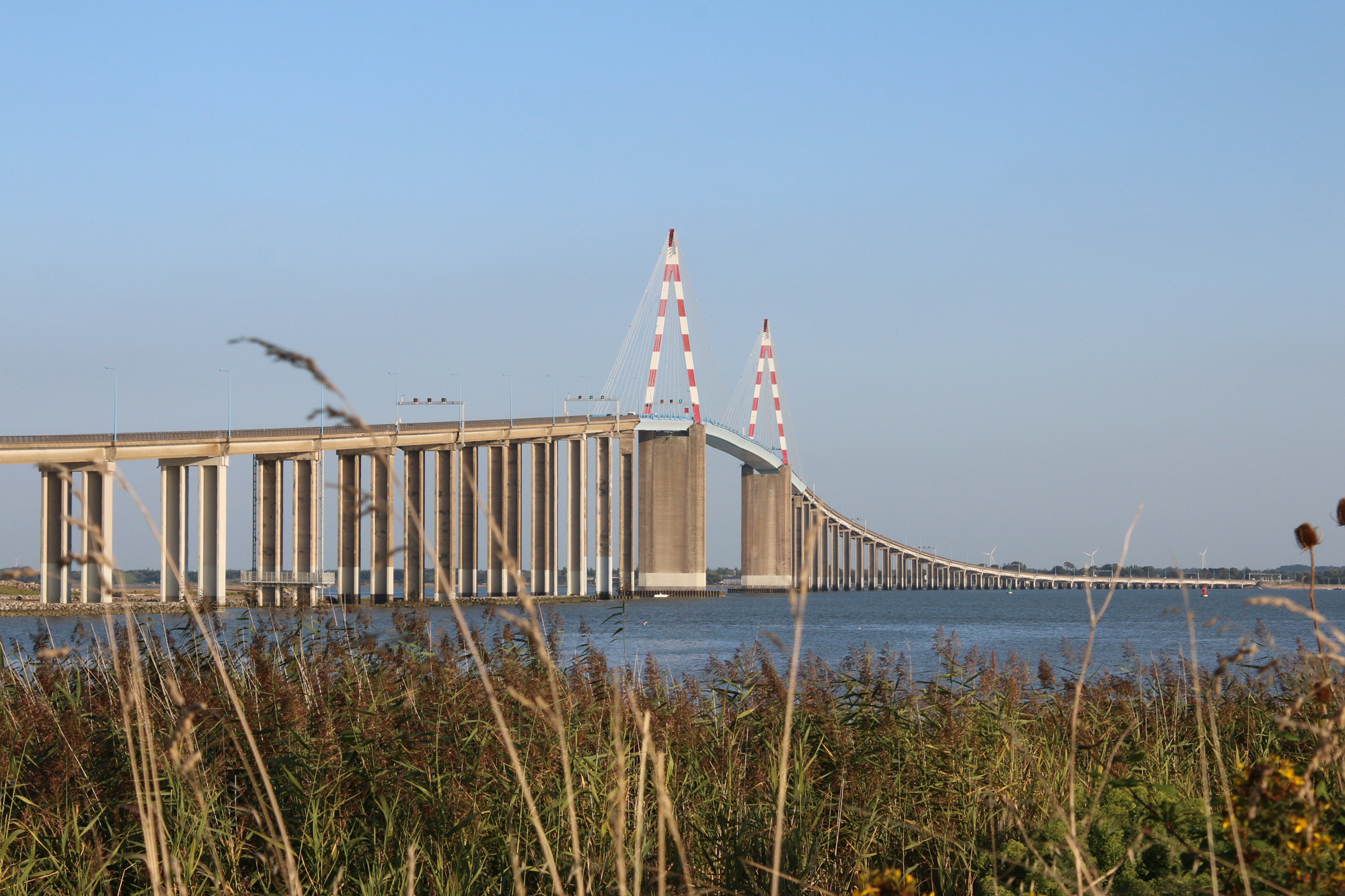
- Coordinates: 47°16′43″N 2°09′57″W
- Carries: Cars, pedestrians and cycles
- Crosses: Loire
- Locale: Saint-Nazaire
- Official name: Pont de Saint-Nazaire
- Maintained by: Conseil général de la Loire-Atlantique

Characteristics
- Design: Cable-stayed bridge
- Total length: 3,356 m
- Longest span: 404 m

History
- Opened: 1975 (built in 1974)

Statistics
- Toll: Free

Location
- Interactive map of Saint-Nazaire Bridge

The Saint-Nazaire Bridge (French: Le pont de Saint-Nazaire; Breton: Pont Sant-Nazer) is a cable-stayed bridge spanning the river Loire and linking Saint-Nazaire on the north bank and Saint-Brevin-les-Pins on the south bank, in the department of Loire-Atlantique, Pays de la Loire, France. The bridge is crossed by the "Route bleue" (RD213).

The cable-stayed metallic structure measures 720 m (2,360 ft) and, including the access viaducts, represents a total length of 3,356 m (11,010 ft).

== History ==
The bridge was commissioned on 18 October 1975, after three years of construction. Including its 404 m (1,325 ft) central span, the 720 m (2,360 ft) metal structure held, at its construction, the world record length for a cable-stayed metallic bridge.

In 1992, the Loire-Atlantique general council took over the Saint-Nazaire SAEM, the contractor for the creation and operation of the bridge. Access to the bridge became toll-free on 1 October 1994.

The building was returned to the department's general council road heritage organization, which has been responsible for its management and maintenance since 1 August 1995. It has improved trading between the north and the south shores of the estuary considerably.

In 1975, the bridge was the longest one ever built in France. Moreover, it held the world record for the longest cable-stayed bridge for eight years.

== Construction and specifications ==
The bridge consists of two access viaducts made out of prestressed concrete: the northern viaduct is 1,115 m (3,658 ft) long, and the southern one is 1,521 m (4,990 ft) long. The main structure is composed of a 720 m-long (2,360 ft) cable-stayed metallic frame. It is crossed by the department road RD 2132.

The construction of the bridge was entrusted to a consortium of companies:

- Metallic construction: Compagnie Française d’Entreprises Métalliques (CFEM);
- Concrete structures: Société Générale d’Entreprises (SGE) (the foundations were subcontracted to Morillon-Corvol, Courbot and Dodin).

== Traffic rules and regulations ==
The speed limit is 70 km/h. Certain or even all vehicles may restricted during strong winds (starting at 80 km/h for cyclists).

The general council has implemented a lane management system for the bridge. The reversible lanes allow, during the day or special events, for a second lane to be dedicated to the busier way. The system has folding barriers, with illuminated red studs that are embedded in the asphalt, and road sign frames that allow for illuminated road signs (green arrow/orange or red cross) to indicate the way that is assigned to each of the three lanes.

Unique in France, the system went live on 25 August 2010 and is regarded as "experimental". In fact, it is a requirement from the state since the traffic code mandates white markings on the ground. The Loire-Atlantique general council has, therefore, received a one-year permit that has renewed every year since then.

However, the illuminated beacons have become too fragile because of the LEDs.

Also, the increased traffic during the summer causes numerous traffic jams despite the system.

To offer an alternative way of crossing the river for pedestrians and cyclists during the summer (May to September), in June 2010 the general council considered a river shuttle service between Saint-Nazaire and Mindin. Because of its prohibitive cost, the idea was abandoned in December 2011.

The only regular coach lines using the bridge and providing intercity connections between Saint-Nazaire and the Pays de Retz region are those of the Lila network (routes 15, 16 and 17). Route 17 vehicles are fitted with eight bicycle-only spaces.

== See also ==
- List of bridges in France
