= Port of Saint-Nazaire =

Seaport in Loire-Atlantique, France

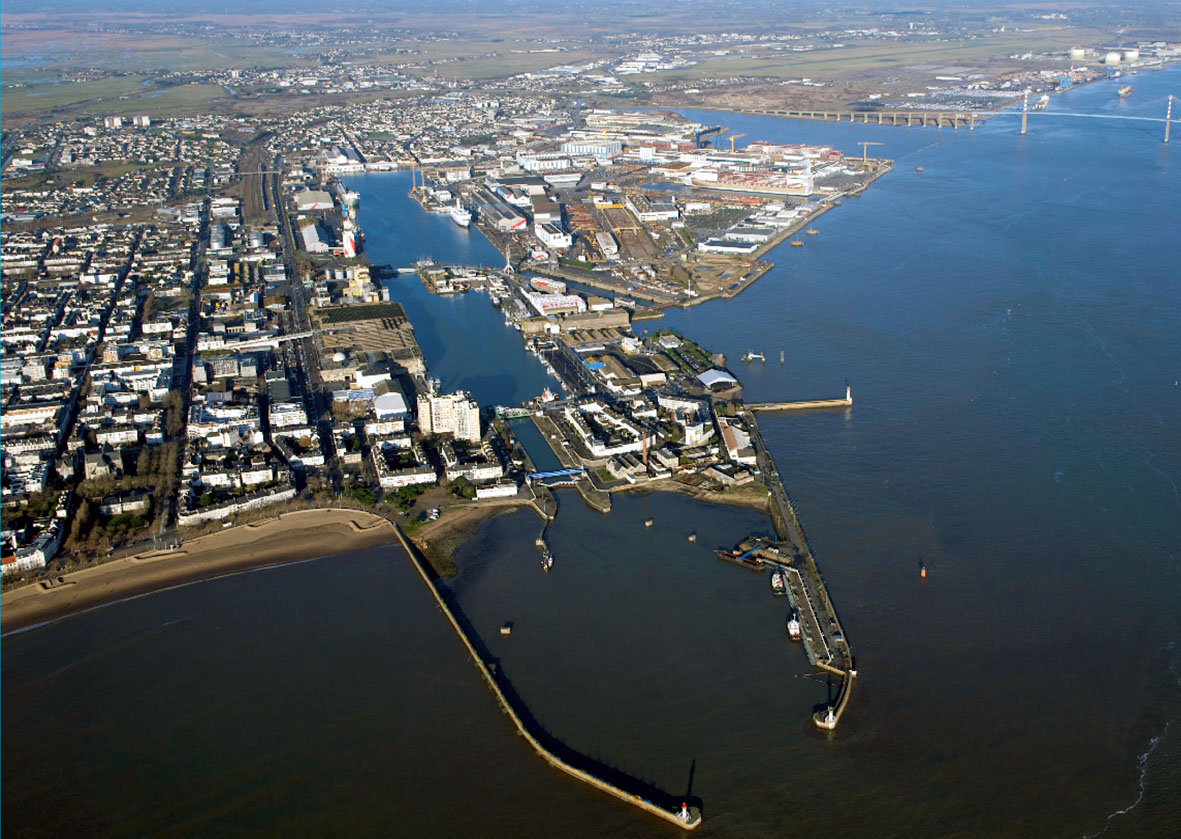
- Interactive map of Port of Saint-Nazaire

Location
- Country: France
- Location: Saint-Nazaire, Loire-Atlantique, Pays de la Loire
- Coordinates: 47.2813°N 2.1986°W

Details
- Opened: 1856
- Type of Harbor: Grand port maritime

The Port of Saint-Nazaire (Breton: Porzh Sant-Nazer) is a commercial port located in Saint-Nazaire, in the Loire-Atlantique department of France. Situated on the right bank at the mouth of the Loire estuary, it is a major component of the Nantes-Saint-Nazaire Great Maritime Port.

== Overview ==
Established in 1856 during the Second French Empire, the port of Saint-Nazaire superseded Paimbœuf, which had served as the primary outport for Nantes since the mid-17th century. Today, the port focuses on cargo handling and ship repair. Its growth is driven by shipbuilding and, more recently, by the renewable energy sector, specifically offshore wind power. (Note: The Saint-Nazaire Offshore Wind Farm, the first of its kind in France, was installed using the infrastructure of the Port of Saint-Nazaire.)

=== Infrastructure ===
The port of Saint-Nazaire includes the following facilities:

- Outer harbor: 7 hectares (17 acres) enclosed by two jetties.
- Two floating basins:
  - Saint-Nazaire Basin (South): 580 metres (1,900 ft) long and 165 metres (541 ft) wide.
  - Penhoët Basin (North): 1,080 metres (3,540 ft) long and 240 metres (790 ft) wide.
- Two locks: The South Lock and the East Lock.
- Louis Joubert Lock: A large dry dock/lock, 350 metres (1,150 ft) in length.
- Three dry docks:
  - Form 1: 241 metres (791 ft)
  - Form 2: 127 metres (417 ft)
  - Form 3: 170 metres (560 ft)

The outer harbor, the South Lock, and the two basins are aligned in a straight path. The port is also equipped with various heavy-lifting equipment, including a sheerleg with a 400-tonne capacity.

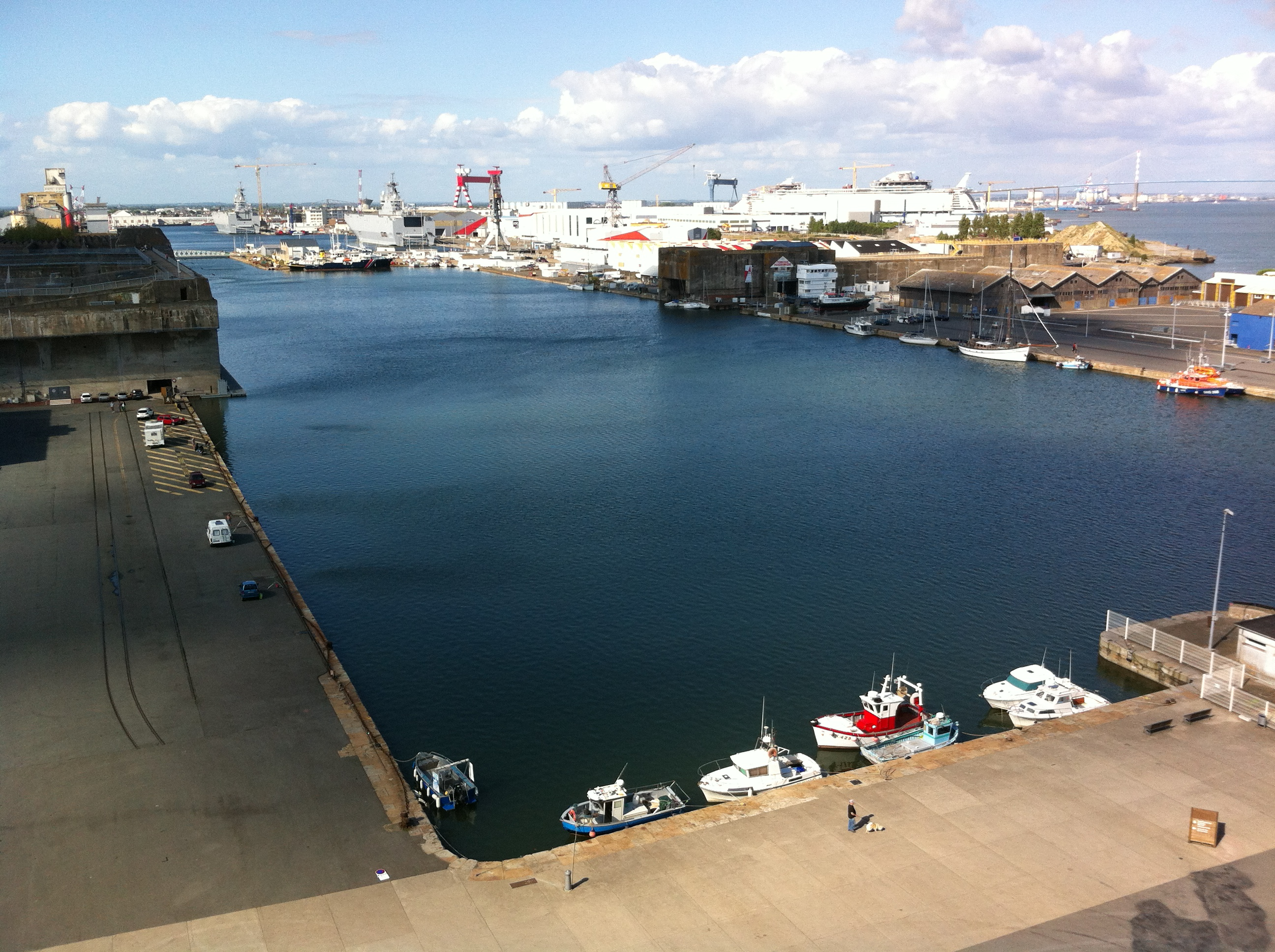
Floating basins of the Port of Saint-Nazaire.

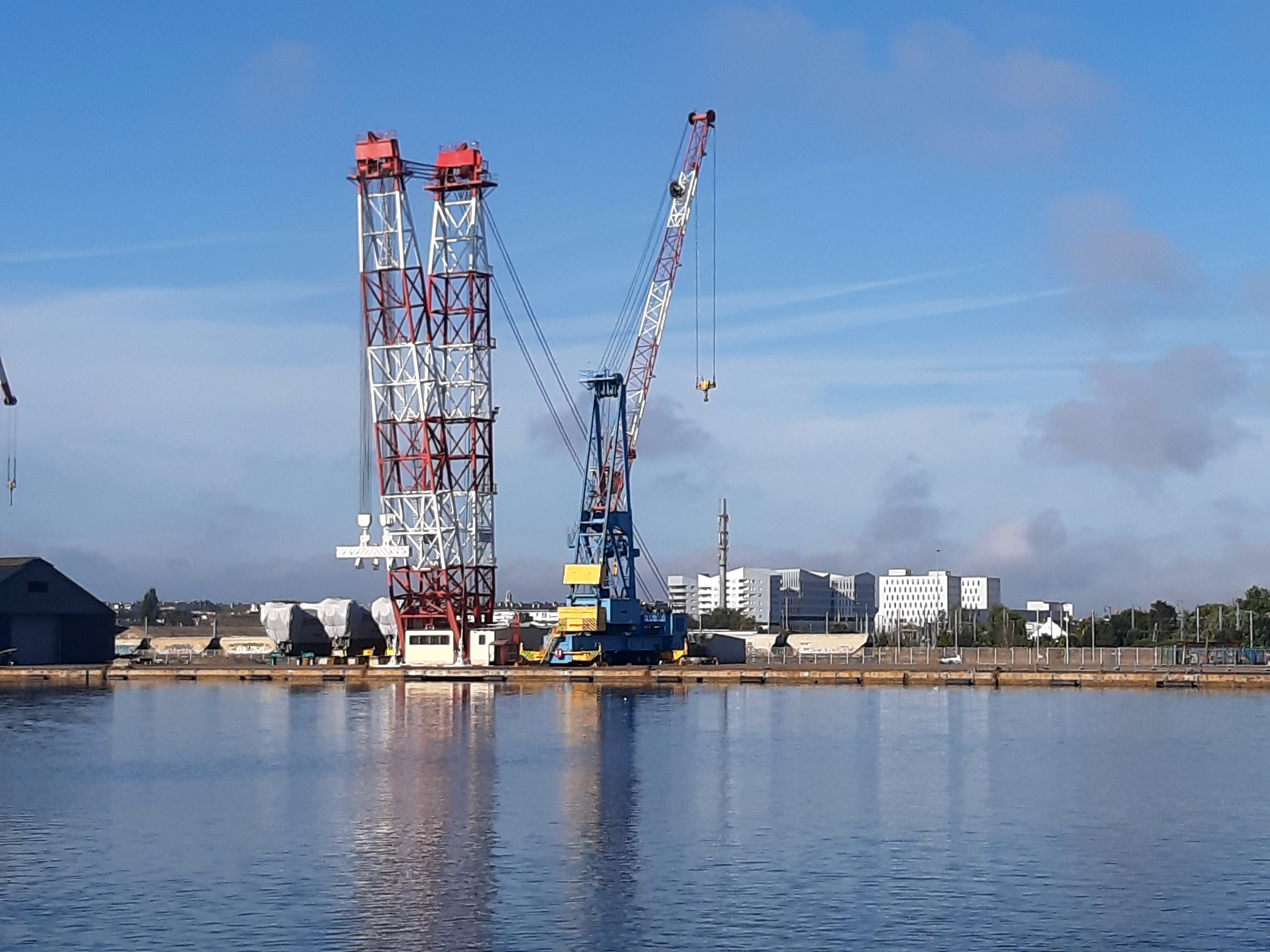
The 400-ton sheerleg at the Quai des Charbonniers.

=== Activities ===
Logistical resources serve several industries, including mechanical and metallurgical construction, food processing, and aeronautics. Dedicated infrastructure supports careening, ship repair, and shipbuilding. Approximately fifty companies are located within the port's domain, most notably the Chantiers de l'Atlantique shipyard.

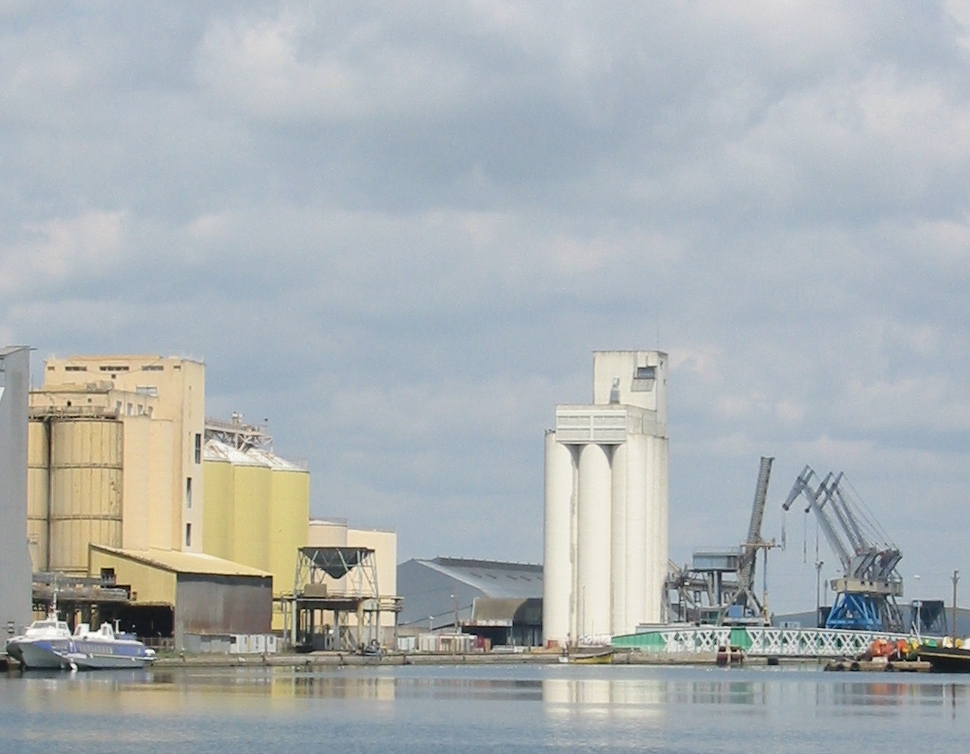
Cargill sunflower oil production plant (Quai Eugène Pereire) and grain silo (Quai des Grands Puits).

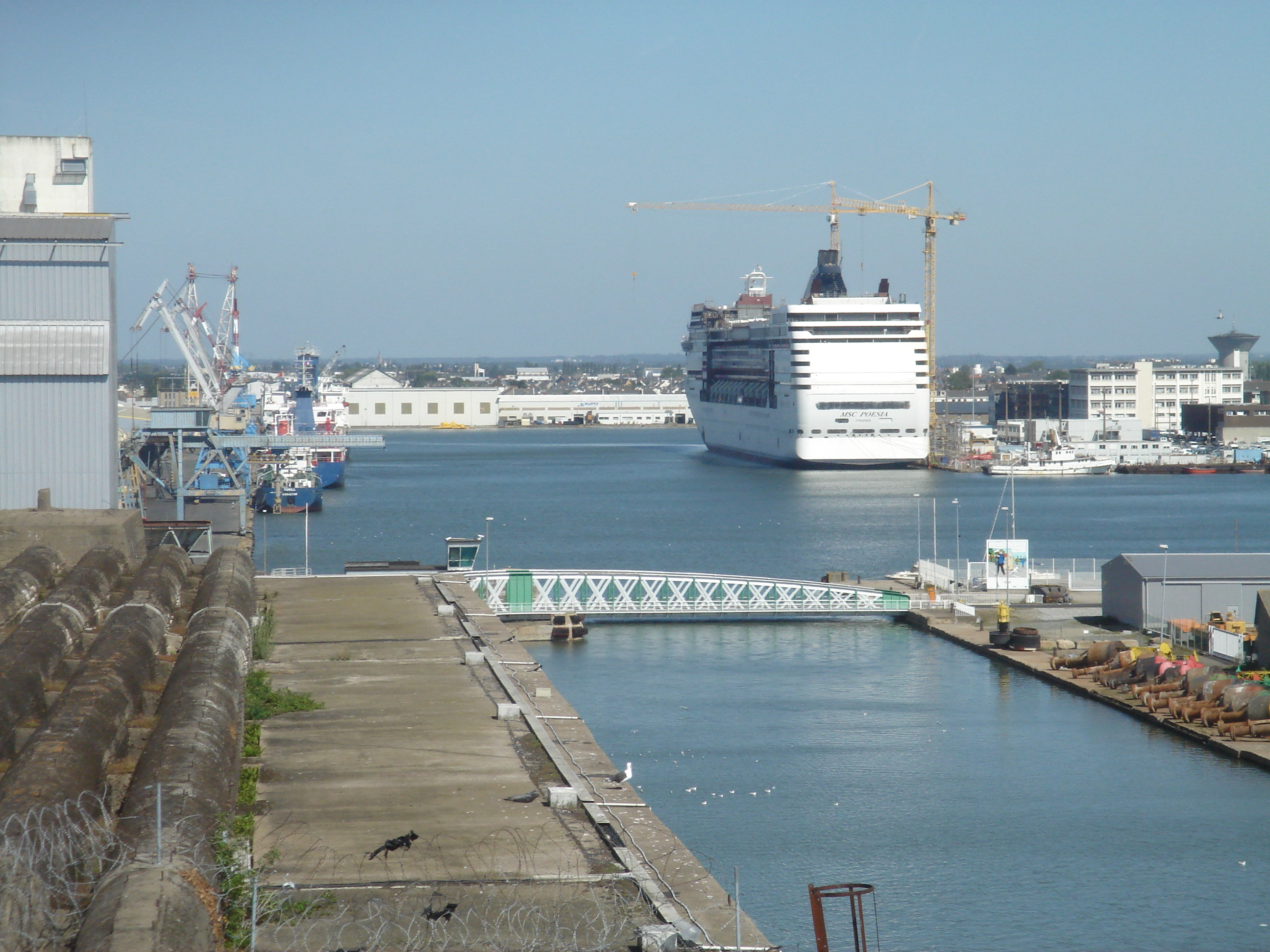
Shipbuilding: Fitting out a cruise ship at the Quai de Penhoët (Pont du Pertuis in the foreground).

== History ==
At the beginning of the 19th century, Saint-Nazaire was a small village of about a hundred houses. In 1835, the "old mole" was built with a lighthouse to provide shelter for Loire River pilots.

In 1838, the decision was made to transform Saint-Nazaire into the outport for Nantes. Excavation of the Saint-Nazaire Basin was completed in 1856. That same year, the harbourmaster's office (capitainerie) was established near the Quai de la Loire (now Quai Demange) to control the main entrance to the port. This marked the transition from a harbour of refuge to a commercial and passenger port.

In 1855, the Pereire brothers founded the Compagnie générale maritime, renamed the Compagnie Générale Transatlantique (CGT) in 1861. Contracted by the French state to transport mail to the West Indies, Panama, and Mexico, the company also established passenger services. In 1862, it ordered five ocean liners from Chantier Scott, the first shipbuilding company in Saint-Nazaire. Regular passenger lines began that year, making Saint-Nazaire a hub for travel to Colón, with stops in Pointe-à-Pitre and Fort-de-France. Another line opened to Veracruz, Mexico, with a stop in Havana, Cuba.

In 1867, a railway station of the Chemin de Fer de Paris à Orléans was built near the ferry terminal, making Saint-Nazaire the closest Atlantic port to Paris. The Forges de Trignac, founded nearby in 1879, supplied the shipyards with steel plates for hulls, importing ore from Spain and coal from England.

The Penhoët Basin opened in 1881, alongside the founding of the Chantiers de Penhoët shipyard. A new entrance via the South Lock opened in 1907.

The Saint-Nazaire water pumping station (usine élévatoire) entered service in 1911. Until it ceased operations in 1993, it maintained the water level in the basins at 5 to 6 metres (16 to 20 ft).

=== World War I ===
Following the United States' entry into World War I in 1917, Saint-Nazaire was chosen as a primary landing site for the American Expeditionary Forces. On 26 June 1917, the first three American ships (Tenadores, Havana, and Saratoga) docked secretly. By the 1918 armistice, nearly 200,000 "Sammies", 50,000 horses, and 20,000 vehicles had passed through the port. To handle the congestion, the Americans built additional wharves at Montoir-de-Bretagne and oil piers at Donges. (Note: The company Antar would later use this infrastructure to establish the Donges refinery in 1931.)

To counter German naval mines and submarines, the French Navy built a maritime aerostation center in Saint-Viaud in 1917. On 1 January 1918, the center was transferred to the United States Navy and became the Paimbœuf Naval Aerostation. With nearly 500 American sailors and four dirigibles, they monitored the coast; no American convoy arriving at Saint-Nazaire was sunk under their watch. The American Monument, also known as the "Sammy", was inaugurated in 1926 to honor these troops.

=== World War II ===
During the German occupation of France, Ernst Kellermann served as the German port commander (Hafenkommandant) from 1940 until 1945. Between 1941 and 1943, the Germans constructed the Saint-Nazaire submarine base to house the Kriegsmarine U-boat fleets. Its construction destroyed the original ferry terminal and basins, effectively ending transatlantic passenger service.

In March 1942, British commandos launched Operation Chariot (the Saint-Nazaire Raid), a successful mission to disable the Joubert Lock and prevent its use for repairing heavy German battleships like Tirpitz. Saint-Nazaire and its port were part of the Saint-Nazaire pocket, one of the last places in Europe to be liberated, surrendering on 11 May 1945, three days after the general German surrender.

=== Post-war to present ===
By the liberation, Saint-Nazaire was 85% destroyed. Rebuilding the port and shipyards was the top priority. Marshall Plan shipments began arriving in August 1945. A new harbormaster's office, designed by architect François Bréérette in a modern classical style, was inaugurated in 1955.

In 1966, the ports of Nantes and Saint-Nazaire were merged into a single state-owned entity, the Port autonome de Nantes-Saint-Nazaire. In 2008, it was designated as the Nantes-Saint-Nazaire Great Maritime Port.

== Map ==
Map of the Port of Saint-Nazaire (1942). 1 Old Mole 2 Petit Maroc Quarter 3 South Lock 4 East Lock 5 German submarine base 6 Louis Joubert Lock 7 Saint-Nazaire Basin 8 Penhoët Basin 9 Outer harbour

== In fiction ==
In The Seven Crystal Balls, the thirteenth volume of The Adventures of Tintin, characters Professor Calculus, Tintin, and Captain Haddock travel through the port of Saint-Nazaire. Several large panels in the city now commemorate their route.

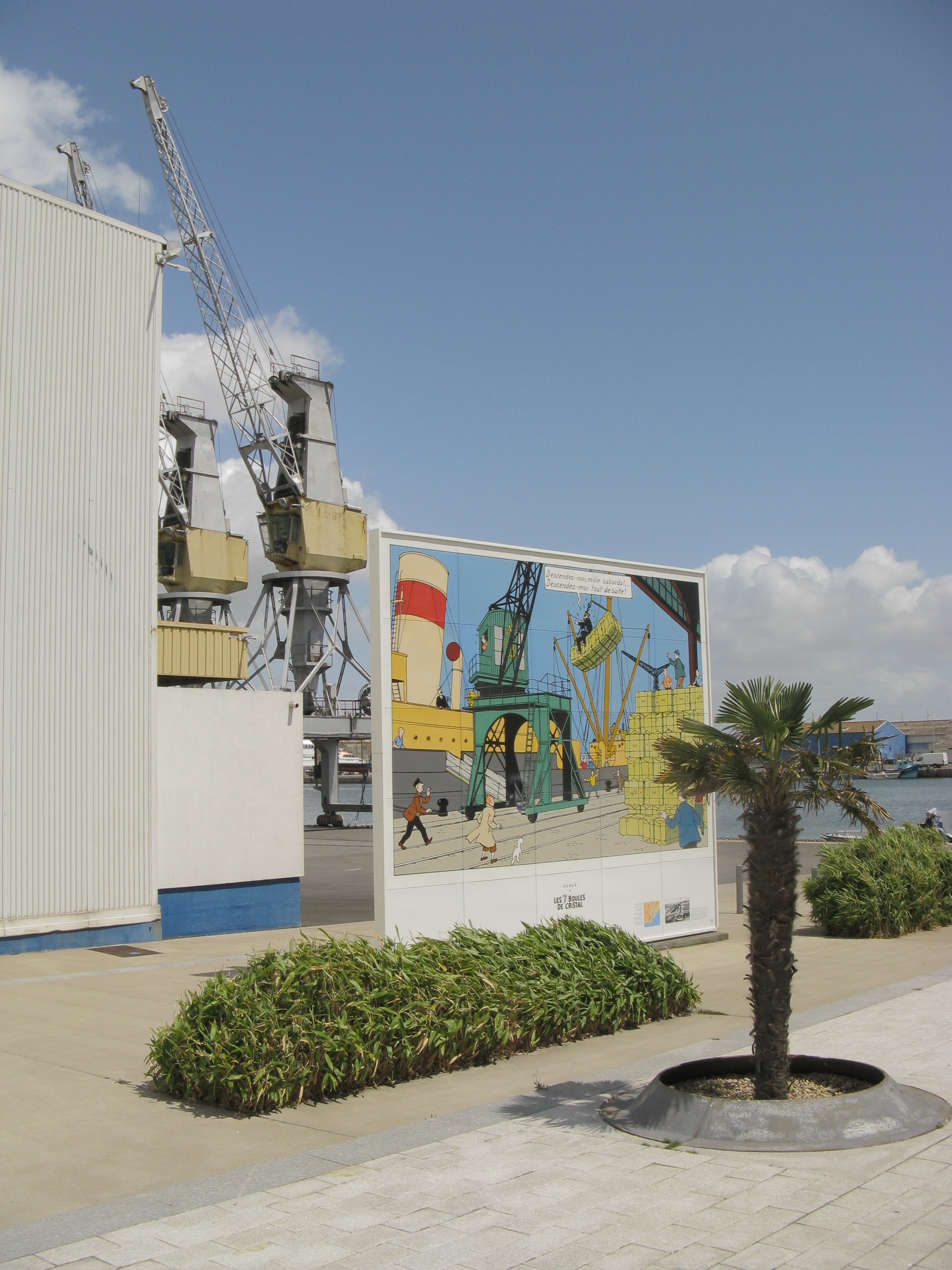
Commemorative Tintin panel at the Quai du Commerce.

== See also ==
- Atlantic Wall
