= Vincent Talio =

French footballer (born 1981)

Personal information
- Date of birth: March 7, 1981 (age 45)
- Place of birth: Saint-Nazaire, France
- Height: 1.81 m (5 ft 11 1/2 in)
- Position: Defender

Team information
- Current team: FC La Tour-le-Pâquier
- Number: 5

Senior career*
Years	Team	Apps	(Gls)
1997–2002	Nantes (B team)	88	(6)
2002–2003	Stade Luçonnais	17	(3)
2003–2004	Raith Rovers	10	(0)
2004–2005	FC Baulmes	30	(2)
2005	Rapid Bucarest		
2006–2010	FC Bulle	110	(10)
2010–2012	FC Monthey		
- FC La Tour-le-Pâquier
- * Club domestic league appearances and goals as of 14:08, 26 November 2009 (UTC)

Vincent Talio (born March 7, 1981) is a French professional football player. Currently, he plays in the Championnat Suisse.

He played on the professional level in the Scottish Football League First Division for Raith Rovers, joining them in July 2003. He scored his first and only goal for Raith in a Scottish Cup defeat to Kilmarnock, before leaving the club in February 2004.
