= Ville de Bordeaux =

Ship carrier

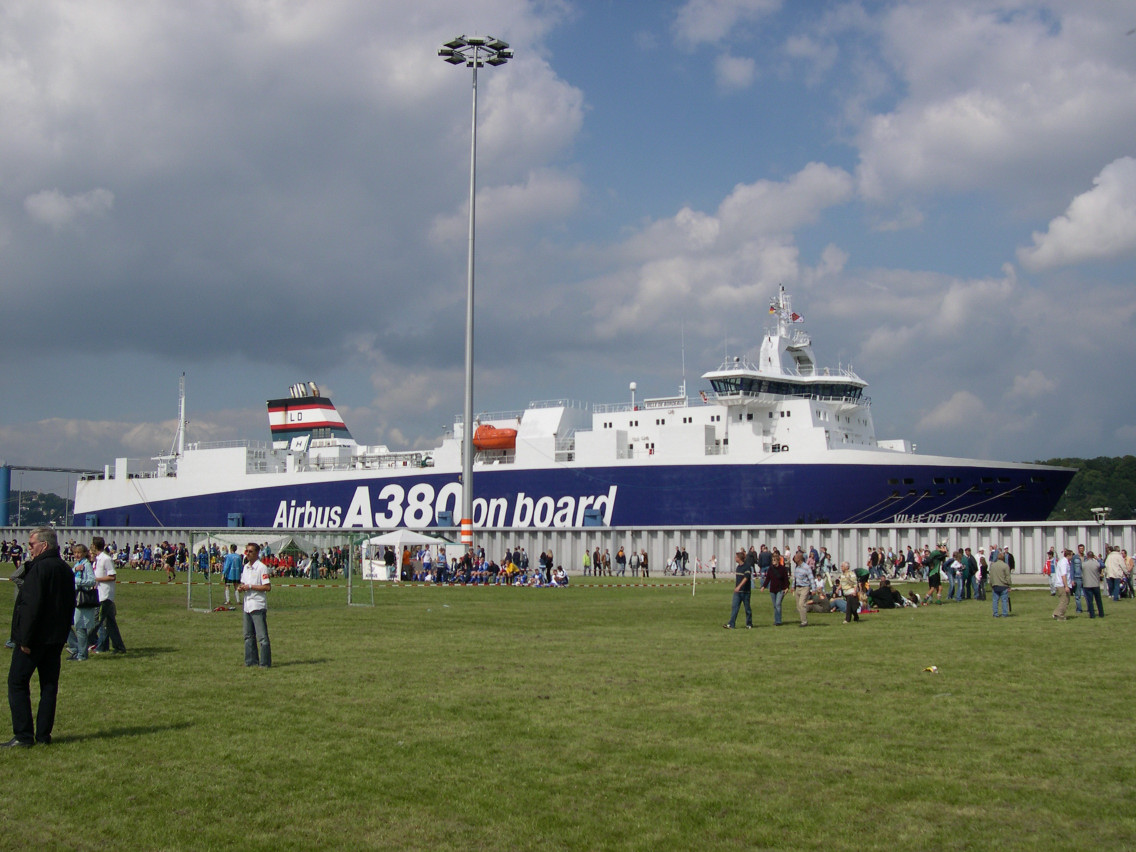

History

France
- Name: Ville de Bordeaux
- Namesake: Bordeaux
- Owner: Louis Dreyfus Armateurs/Leif Höegh & Co; 20year+10 lease to Airbus
- Operator: Fret/CETAM
- Port of registry: Bordeaux, France
- Builder: Jingling shipyard, Nanjing, China
- Cost: $30 million
- Yard number: 02-0401
- Launched: 30 July 2003
- Commissioned: April 2004
- Identification: IMO: 9270842; Callsign: FZCE

General characteristics
- Type: Roll-on/roll-off ferry
- Tonnage: 21,528 GT
- Length: 154 m (505 ft 3 in)
- Beam: 28 m (91 ft 10 in)
- Draft: 5.5 m (18 ft 1 in)
- Installed power: Diesel

Ville de Bordeaux is a ship which was designed to transport the elements of the Airbus A380, but now transports parts for the Airbus A320 between Europe and the United States. The ship has been retrofitted with Seawing's and eSAILs, new technologies aiming to cut the carbon emissions of ships.

== A380 production ==
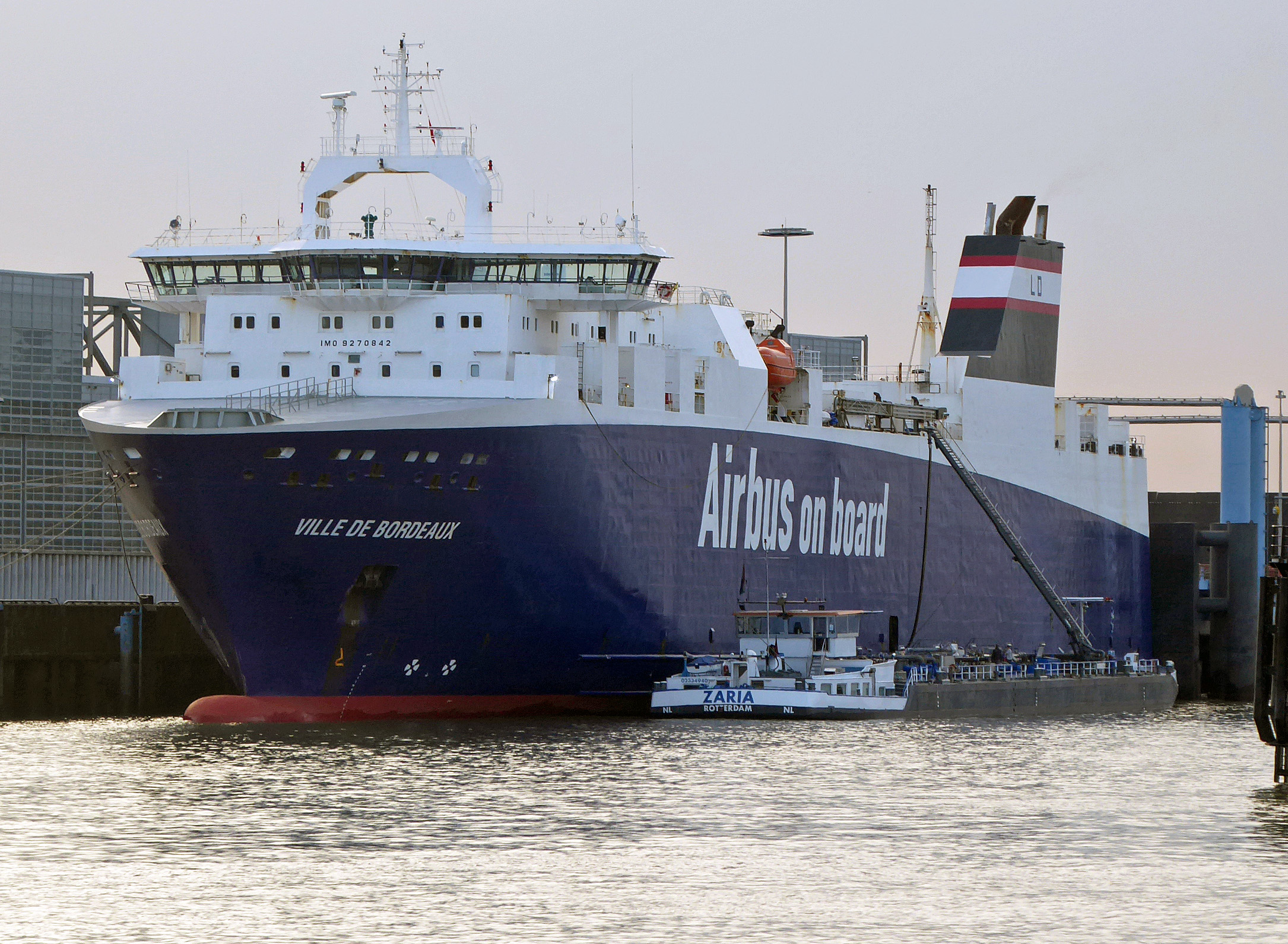
Ville de Bordeaux in 2021 at Airbus in Hamburg

The origin of Airbus as a European holding company for a series of country-based existing aerospace manufacturers resulted in a geographically diversified structure with plants in France, Germany, Spain, and the United Kingdom. Transportation of components and sub-structures of existing Airbus models was facilitated by air, using the specially developed A300-600ST Beluga aircraft.

As the major components and sub-assembly structures of the A380 were too big for the A300-600ST, Airbus were forced to choose between consolidating their diverse existing European factory infrastructure, or finding a way of transporting the components to a final assembly plant in Toulouse. Airbus chose to keep the plants diversified, using sea and road transport, with the production facilities and supply chain scaled for a production rate of four A380s per month.

== Design ==
Conceived by Deltamarin, the Ville de Bordeaux was designed as a roll-on/roll-off ship. She was built in Nanjing, China at the Jinling shipyard.

Built for a cost of $30million, the ship was launched on 30 July 2003. She is the lead ship in a fleet of three roll-on/roll-off ships leased to Airbus; the others being the City of Hamburg delivered in 2008 and Ciudad de Cadiz delivered in 2009.

Jointly owned by Louis Dreyfus Armateurs of France, and Norwegian ship-owner Leif Höegh & Co, she is operated jointly by their subsidiary companies Fret and CETAM on a 20+10year lease to Airbus. The ship started operations on 10 June 2004.

In 2021 Ville de Bordeaux was fitted with a 500 m^{2} (5,400 sq ft) 'Seawing' - an automated foil kite developed by AirSeas (an Airbus subsidiary) to provide wind assistance to propulsion - and in January 2022 commenced six months of sea trials in preparation for full deployment.

In March 2024, Ville de Bordeux was fitted with eSAILs, aiming to reduce carbon emissions of Airbus's transport operations and the company as a whole. The ship underwent six months of performance monitoring after the sails were fitted.

== Operations ==
Starting at the Airbus Hamburg Finkenwerder plant on the River Elbe, the ship loads the front and rear sections of the fuselage, then sails to the United Kingdom. The wings, which are manufactured at Filton in Bristol and Broughton, Flintshire in North Wales, are transported by barge to Mostyn docks, where the ship adds them to its cargo. In Saint-Nazaire in western France, the ship trades the fuselage sections from Hamburg for larger, assembled sections, some of which include the nose. The ship unloads in Bordeaux. Afterwards, the ship picks up the belly and tail sections by Construcciones Aeronáuticas SA in Cádiz in southern Spain, and delivers them to Bordeaux. From there, the A380 parts are transported by barge to Langon, and by the oversize road convoys of the Itinéraire à Grand Gabarit from there to the assembly hall in Toulouse.

After assembly, the aircraft are flown to Hamburg Finkenwerder Airport, part of the Hamburg Finkenwerder plant from which their journey started, to be furnished and painted.

By 2026, three more ships are being built for charter to Airbus to move large aircraft sub-assemblies between its production sites in Europe and North America. Each ship has 6 Flettner rotors.
