= Hôtel de Ville, Saint-Nazaire =

Town hall in Saint-Nazaire, France

Hôtel de Ville
- The main frontage of the Hôtel de Ville in July 2011

General information
- Type: City hall
- Architectural style: Modern style
- Location: Saint-Nazaire, France
- Coordinates: 47.2733°N 2.2139°W
- Completed: 1960

Design and construction
- Architect: Michel Roux-Spitz

The Hôtel de Ville (French pronunciation: [otɛl də vil], City Hall) is a municipal building in Saint-Nazaire, Loire-Atlantique, western France, standing on Place François Blancho.

== History ==
Following development of the port area, the first town hall in Saint-Nazaire was commissioned by the town council, led by the mayor, René-Marie Guillouzo, in the mid-19th century. The site they chose was on the north side of Rue de l'Hôtel de Ville (now Place du Commando). It was designed by a Monsieur L'Hotellier in the neoclassical style, built in ashlar stone and was completed in 1855.

The design involved a symmetrical main frontage of five bays facing onto Rue de l'Hôtel de Ville. The central bay featured a recessed opening fronted by two Doric order columns supporting an entablature with triglyphs and a balustraded balcony. The other bays on the ground floor were fenestrated by casement windows with cornices, and the bays on the first floor were fenestrated by casement windows with triangular pediments. At roof level, there was an entablature and a modillioned cornice. The minister for education and fine arts, Aristide Briand, was among officials who stood on the balcony of the town hall during a visit for the inauguration of the southern entrance to the docks in September 1907.

At the time of the St Nazaire Raid in March 1942, the old town hall was the headquarters of the Défense Passive (Civil Protection). It was badly damaged in a raid by American and British bomber aircraft on 16 February 1943, and completely destroyed in a firebombing raid, intended to make the port inoperable and the town inhabitable, on 28 February 1943, during the Second World War.

After the war, the local council was temporarily accommodated in the barracks in the village of Briandais. The council then proceeded to commission a new town hall on a site which had been completely cleared of bombed out buildings. The foundation stone for the new building was laid on 30 December 1955. It was designed by Michel Roux-Spitz in the modern style, built in stone and was officially opened by the prefect of Loire-Atlantique, Pierre Trouillé, and the former government minister, Francois Blancho, on 28 February 1960, which was the 17th anniversary of the destruction of the old town hall.

The building featured a large portico of 11 bays with three double-height glass doorways on the ground floor and large sections of plate glass spanning the second and third floors. The sections on either side of the portico and the floor above the portico were all fenestrated by uniform casement windows. Internally, the principal room was the Salle du Conseil (council chamber) which, in 1982, was relocated from the fourth floor to a larger area on the second floor.

In 2016, the building was listed as "Patrimoine du XXe siècle" i.e. an official "20th-century heritage" building.
