= Michel Roux-Spitz =

French architect (1888-1957)

- Born: 13 June 1888
- Died: 15 July 1957 (aged 69)
- Occupation: Architect
- Awards: Prix de Rome in 1920

Michel Roux-Spitz (13 June 1888 – 15 July 1957) was a French architect.

== Life ==
Roux-Spitz was born 13 June 1888 in Lyon. The son of an architect, he entered the École des Beaux-Arts, Lyon in the studio of Tony Garnier and then became a student in the workshop of Gaston Redon and Alfred Henry Recoura at the National School of Fine Arts in Paris. He won the Prix de Rome in 1920. He moved to Paris on his return from Rome in 1924. Influenced by Auguste Perret, he made a characteristic building of his style - with bay windows to 3 sides on the front - at 14 Guynemer street in Paris. He repeated that form in several works, such as the Quai d'Orsay, known as the "White Series".

He was appointed editor in chief of The Architect between 1925 and 1932, then joined the Board of Patrons of the journal L'Architecture d'aujourd'hui in 1930. He again became editor of the French magazine Architecture between 1943 and 1950. Roux-Spitz used these various forums to defend the position of modern architects, but opposed the radical principles of Le Corbusier. He was also a professor of theory at the École nationale supérieure des Beaux-Arts in 1940.

Official duties included chief architect of civil buildings and national palaces, and architect of the postal services. He was chief architect of the National Library in 1932 and remained so until 1953, in this post making a rearrangement within the current Richelieu site and construction of an annex to Versailles. On 29 March 1945, he was appointed chief architect for reconstruction of the township of Nantes. His reconstruction plan was finally approved in 1947.

Roux-Spitz died on 15 July 1957 at Dinard.

== Key achievements ==
- 1924: Tombstone of Andrew Bouxin, Aubenton ( Aisne )
- 1925: Castle Choulans or Turrets, current Cervantes Institute in Lyon
- 1925-1928: 14 rue Guynemer building in the 6th arrondissement of Paris (inscribed MH)
- 1924-1929: Theatre de la Croix-Rousse in Lyon
- 1928: Dental School Lyon
- 1928-1930: Monument "In Defence of the Suez Canal", Ismailia ( Egypt )
- 1929: Building 89 Quai d'Orsay, 22 rue Cognac-Jay in the 7th arrondissement of Paris
- 1929-1931: Building 115 avenue Henri-Martin / St-Octave Feuillet in the 16th arrondissement of Paris
- 1930: 45-47 Boulevard building of Inkerman in Neuilly-sur-Seine (included MH)
- 1930: Building of homes and artists' studios, 3 rue de la Cité Universitaire in the 14th arrondissement of Paris (inscribed MH)
- 1930: expansion of the engineering works to Delachaux Gennevilliers ( Hauts-de-Seine )
- 1931: Post Office-Paris Bourse
- 1931-1933: National School of Ceramics, attached to the National Manufactory of Sèvres
- 1932: Annex to the National Library in Versailles
- 1932-1935: Central Cheque Postal rue des Favorites, in the 15th arrondissement of Paris
- 1935-1938: Post Hotel in Lyon
- 1938: Villa "Greystone", facing the sea at Dinard (owned by the architect)
- 1947-1949: City of blast pavements, street paving in high- Nantes
- 1948-1950: Regional Directorate of PTT in Paris
- 1949-1955: development of Place Brittany in Nantes
- 1951-1964: CHU - Hôtel-Dieu de Nantes, finished by his collaborator Yves Liberge and his son Jean Roux-Spitz
- 1955-1961: Hospital of Dijon completed by Jean Roux-Spitz
- 1956-1959: Hôtel de Ville, (city hall) St. Nazaire

== Bibliography ==
=== Writings by the architect ===
- Michel Roux-Spitz, "Against the new formalism", in L'Architecture d'aujourd'hui No. 3, April 1932, p. 61-63 reprinted: "Against the new formalism", followed by "Towards a new order ...", ed. Altamira, 1994.

=== Written about the architect ===
- Didier Laroque; Michel Raynaud; Sylvie Rémy (1984). Michel Roux-Spitz architecte 1888–1957 (PDF). Bruxelles: Mardaga. ISBN 2-87009-194-X. Compte-rendu de Danièle Voldman dans la revue XX^{e} siècle n°6, 1985
- Michel Roux-Spitz : réalisations, Préfacier Jean PORCHER & Julien CAIN, éd. Vincent, Fréal, & Cie, [1933]-1959, 3 Vol.
- Julien Cain (1957). Michel Roux-Spitz : Architecte en chef de la Bibliothèque nationale. Vol. 7–8. BBF. pp. 569–571.
- Simon Texier, "Michel Roux-Spitz : les paradoxes de la série blanche", in Éric Lapierre (dir.), Identification d'une ville : architectures de Paris, éd. Picard/Pavillon de l'Arsenal, 2002, p. 126-137.
