= British Commando operations during the Second World War =

Commandos
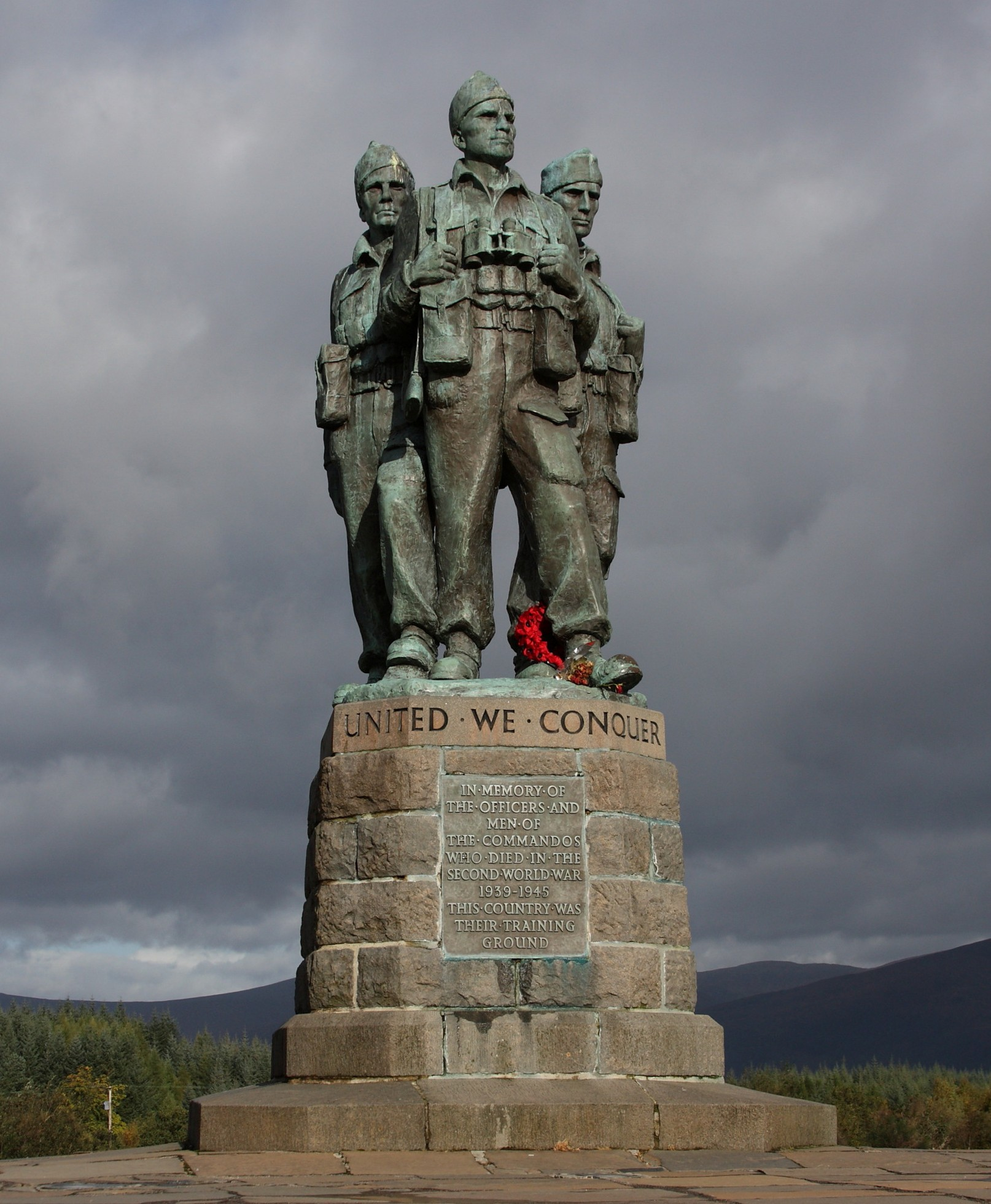
- The Commando Memorial
- Active: 1940–1945
- Country: United Kingdom
- Allegiance: United Kingdom
- Branch: British Army; Royal Marines; Royal Navy; Royal Air Force
- Type: Commando
- Role: Coastal raiding Assault infantry Special operations
- Part of: Combined Operations
- Engagements: Second World War
- Decorations: Battle honours: Adriatic; Alethangyaw; Aller; Anzio; Argenta Gap; Burma 1943–45; Crete; Dieppe; Dives Crossing; Djebel Choucha; Flushing; Greece 1944–45; Italy 1943–45; Kangow; Landing at Porto San Venere; Landing in Sicily; Leese; Litani; Madagascar; Middle East 1941, 42, 44; Monte Ornito; Myebon; Normandy Landings; North Africa 1941–43; North-West Europe 1942, 1944, 1945; Norway 1941; Pursuit to Messina; Rhine; St. Nazaire; Salerno; Sedjenane 1; Sicily 1943; Steamroller Farm; Syria 1941; Termoli; Vaagso; Valli di Comacchio; Westkapelle

Commanders
- Notable commanders: Roger Keyes; Louis Mountbatten; Robert Laycock; John Durnford-Slater; Peter Young; Simon Fraser, 15th Lord Lovat; Ronnie Tod; Augustus Charles Newman; Jack Churchill

Insignia
- Combined Operations Shoulder Patch

The Commandos formed during the Second World War, following an order from the British Prime Minister Winston Churchill in June 1940 for a force that could carry out raids against German-occupied Europe. Churchill stated in a minute to General Ismay on 6 June 1940: "Enterprises must be prepared, with specially-trained troops of the hunter class, who can develop a reign of terror down these coasts, first of all on the "butcher and bolt" policy..." Commandos were all volunteers for special service and originally came from the British Army but volunteers would eventually come from all branches of the United Kingdom's armed forces and foreign volunteers from countries occupied by the Germans. These volunteers formed over 30 individual units and four assault brigades.

The commandos would serve in all the theatres of war from the Arctic Circle, to Europe, the Middle East and the Pacific. Their operations ranged from small groups of men landing from the sea or by parachute to a brigade of assault troops spearheading the Allied invasions of Europe and Asia.

After the Second World War most of the commands were disbanded leaving just the Royal Marine 3 Commando Brigade but their legacy is the present day Royal Marines Commandos, the Parachute Regiment, Special Air Service and the Special Boat Service who can all trace their origins to the commandos. Their legacy also extends to mainland Europe, the French Naval commandos, the Dutch Korps Commandotroepen and the Belgian Paracommando Brigade can all trace their origins to men who volunteered to serve with the British Commandos.

== Operations ==
=== 1940 ===
The first commando raid was Operation Collar, which took place on 24/25 June 1940. The raid was not carried out by a commando unit, but by one of their predecessors, No.11 Independent Company. Under the command of Major Ronnie Tod it was an offensive reconnaissance on the French coast south of Boulogne-sur-Mer and Le Touquet. The operation was a limited success, and the only British injury was a bullet graze to Lieutenant Colonel Dudley Clarke (who was there as an observer), while at least two German soldiers were killed. A second and similarly inconsequential attack, Operation Ambassador, was launched on the German-occupied island of Guernsey on the night of 14 July 1940, by men drawn from H Troop of No. 3 Commando under command of John Durnford-Slater and No. 11 Independent Company. One unit landed on the wrong island, another disembarked from its launch into water that came over their heads. Intelligence had indicated that there was a large German barracks on the island but the Commandos only discovered empty buildings. On their return to the beach they discovered that heavy seas had forced their launch off shore and they then had to swim out to sea to get picked up.

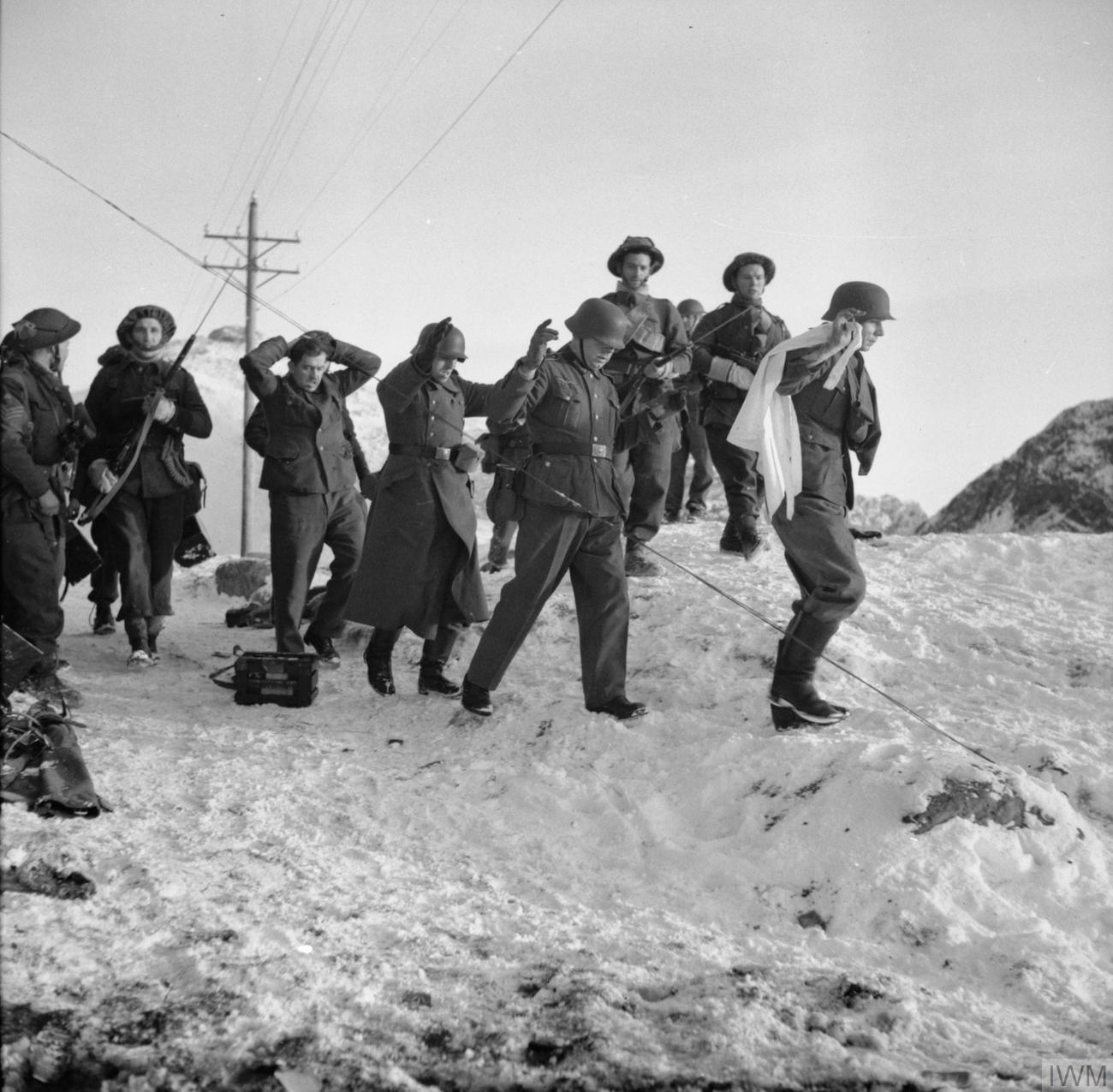
German soldiers captured during Operation Archery

=== 1941 ===
In February 1941, a force of commandos under Colonel Robert Laycock was sent to the Middle East to carry out raids in the eastern Mediterranean. This force became known as 'Layforce' after their commander and initially they were drawn from 'A' Troop from No. 3 Commando, No. 7 Commando, No. 8 (Guards) Commando, and No. 11 (Scottish) Commando.

The next raid of any consequence from the United Kingdom was Operation Claymore in March 1941, by No. 3 and No. 4 Commandos. This was the first large scale raid from the United Kingdom during the war. Their objective was the undefended Norwegian Lofoten Islands. They successfully destroyed the fish-oil factories, petrol dumps, and 11 ships, capturing 216 Germans, encryption equipment and codebooks.

In April, Layforce received orders to begin carrying out raids on the Afrika Korps lines of communication along the North African coast. On 12 April, they carried out a preliminary move to Alexandria and three days later they received orders to carry out a raid on Bardia and another on Bomba. The attacks had to be abandoned, however, due to high seas which would have made disembarking and re-embarking too dangerous. The appearance of the commandos behind their lines forced the Germans to divert the main part of an armoured brigade from where they had previously been undertaking offensive action around Sollum, in order to defend against further raids.

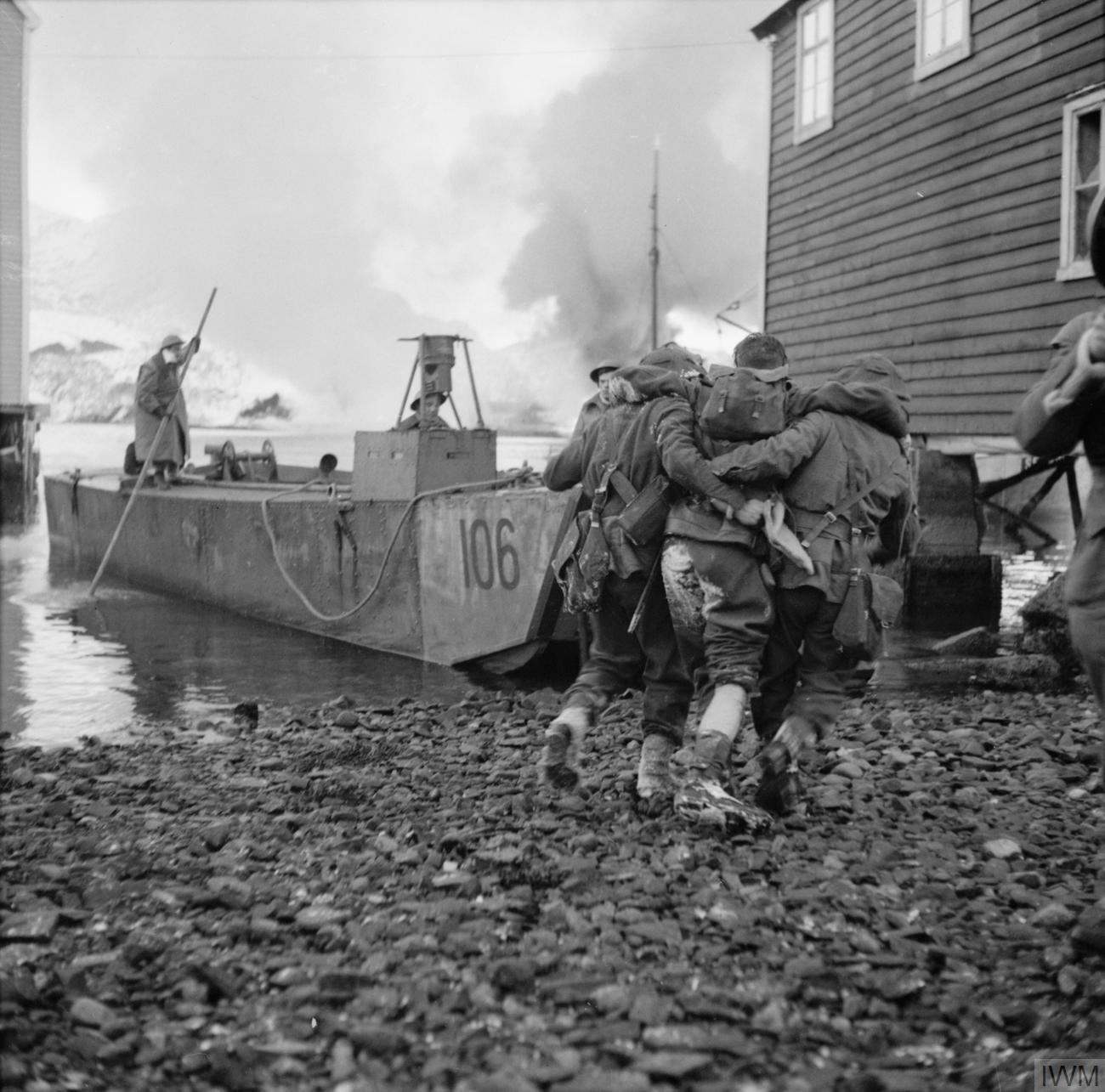
Operation Archery a wounded soldier is being helped onto an LCA

Layforce less No. 11 (Scottish) Commando was next involved in the Battle of Crete in May. They were deployed to the island to carry out raids on the German lines of communications with a view to either turning back the invasion or enabling an evacuation to take place. By 31 May the evacuation from Crete was drawing to a close and the Commandos, running low on ammunition, rations and water, fell back towards Sphakia. Laycock and some of his headquarters, including his intelligence officer Evelyn Waugh managed to get out on the last ship to depart, however the vast majority of the Commandos were left behind. Of the 800 commandos that had been sent to Crete, by the end of the operation about 600 were listed as killed, missing or wounded and only 23 officers and 156 others managed to get off the island.

In June, the Allies invaded Vichy French controlled Syria and Lebanon, Operation Exporter. As a part of this operation, No. 11 (Scottish) Commando were tasked with seizing a crossing over the Litani River. The action cost the Commando over 120 casualties, which equated to nearly a quarter of their strength.

By July, the operations that Layforce had undertaken had severely reduced their strength and in the circumstances reinforcements were unlikely. The operational difficulties that had been exposed during the Bardia raid, combined with the strategic imperatives that had developed as the situation in the Middle East had evolved, and the overarching inability of the high command to fully embrace the commando concept had largely served to make the force ineffective and as a result the decision was made to disband Layforce. Many of the men went back to their previous regiments following the decision, while others chose to remain in the Middle East and subsequently joined the Special Air Service and the Special Boat Squadron.

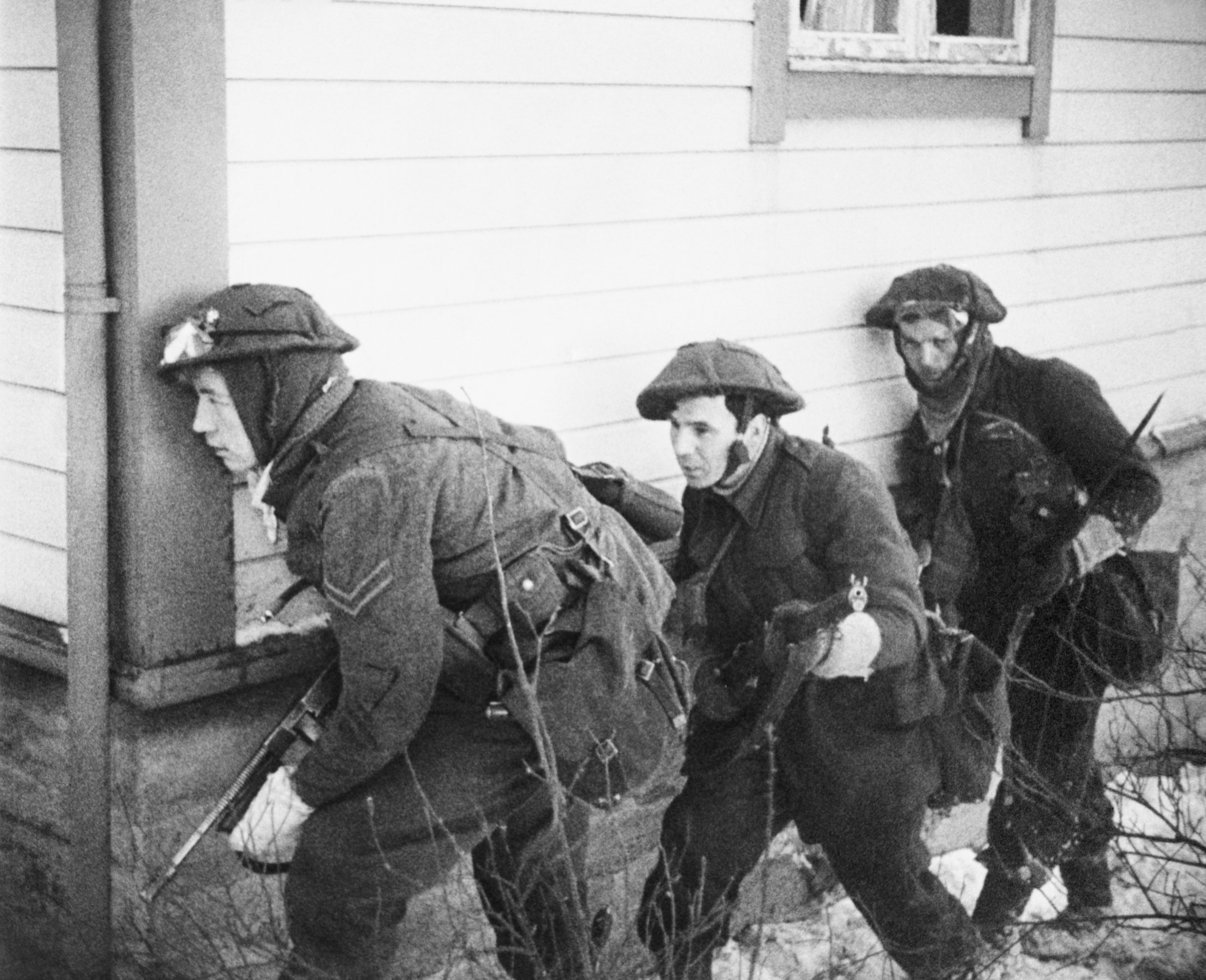
Commandos during Operation Archery the Commando on the left is armed with the Thompson submachine gun

In August, No. 5 Commando carried out landings near Hardelot and Merlimont in France as part of Operation Acid Drop. The objective of the raids was to generally harass the garrison, and carry out reconnaissance and gather intelligence. In the end, however, they spent only half an hour ashore and failed to make contact with the defenders before re-embarking on their landing craft.

In November, No. 11 (Scottish) Commando took part in Operation Flipper. The objectives of the raid were: attack the German headquarters near Beda Littoria, the Italian headquarters at Cyrene, the intelligence centre at Apollonia and various communications facilities. One of the main goals was to kill the German commander Erwin Rommel. This was intended to disrupt enemy organisation before the start of Operation Crusader. The raid was not a success but one of the raid commanders Lieutenant Colonel Geoffrey Charles Tasker Keyes was awarded a posthumous Victoria Cross.

There were two raids in Norway, in December. The first, which took place on 26 December, was Operation Anklet. This was a raid on the Lofoten Islands by No. 12 Commando. The raid was to provide a diversion for the larger raid at Vågsøy Island, Operation Archery. The German garrison, amid Christmas celebrations, was easily overcome and the Commandos re-embarked after two days. The second raid on 27 December, Operation Archery, involved men from Nos. 2, 3, 4 and 6 Commandos, a flotilla from the Royal Navy, and limited air support. The raid caused significant damage to factories, warehouses, the German garrison, and also sank eight ships. The raid prompted the Germans to reinforce the garrison occupying Norway by an extra 30,000 troops, upgrade coastal and inland defences, and send a number of capital ships to the area.

=== 1942 ===
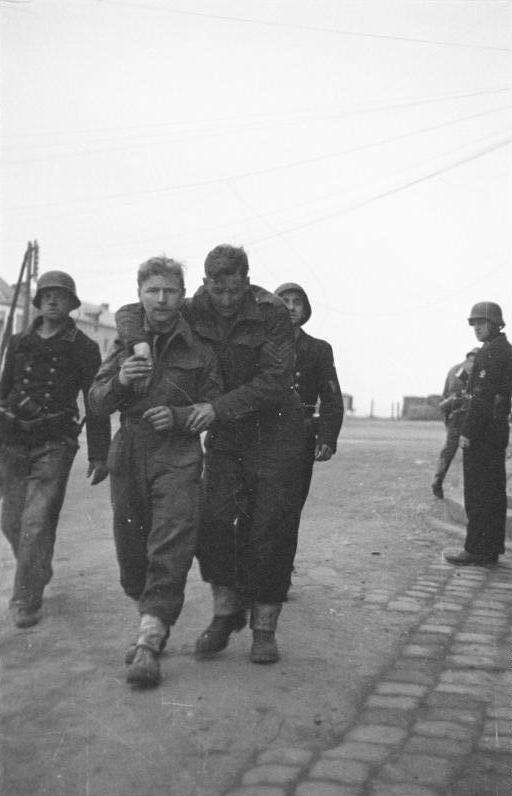
Commandos captured after Operation Chariot the St. Nazaire raid

Operation Postmaster was launched in January 1942. During this, No. 62 Commando carried out a raid in neutral Spanish Guinea, when they seized an Italian liner, a German tanker and a yacht from Santa Isabel.

In March, No. 2 Commando plus demolition experts from Numbers 1, 3, 4, 5, 6, 9 and 12 Commandos took part in Operation Chariot the St Nazaire Raid. The destroyer HMS Campbeltown had 24 Mark VII depth-charges (4 1/4 tons) cemented below decks behind the forward gun support. Accompanied by 18 smaller ships, the Campbeltown sailed into port where she was rammed directly into the Normandie dock gates. The commandos engaged the German forces and destroyed the dock facilities. Eight hours later, delayed-action fuses set off the explosives in the Campbeltown which wrecked the dock gates and killed some 360 Germans and French. A total of 611 soldiers and sailors took part in Chariot; 169 were killed and 200 (most wounded) taken prisoner. Only 242 returned immediately. Of the 241 commandos who took part 64 were posted as killed or missing and 109 captured. Among participants in the raid two commandos Lieutenant Colonel Augustus Charles Newman and Sergeant Thomas Durrant together with three members of the Royal Navy were awarded the Victoria Cross, while 80 others received decorations for gallantry.

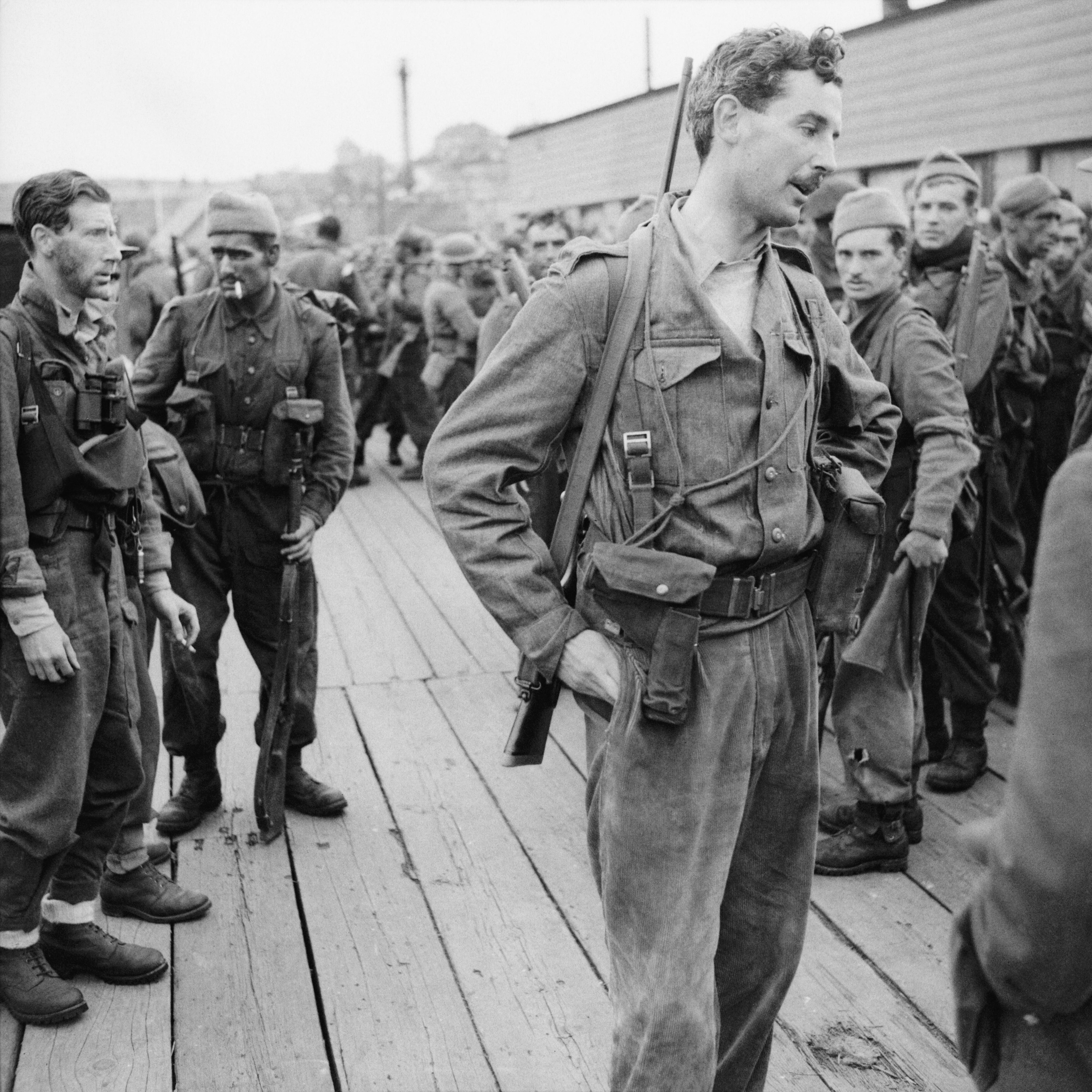
Lord Lovat and men from No. 4 Commando at Newhaven after returning from the Dieppe raid

In April, No. 4 Commando supported by 50 men from the Canadian Carleton and York Regiment and some Royal Engineers, took part in Operation Abercrombie a raid on Hardelot, France. This was a small raid with just two hours ashore. Its objectives were to reconnoitre and damage the beach defences, take prisoners and destroy a searchlight battery. Defences were found to be light and/or abandoned as they advanced and only three Germans were encountered at close quarters who withdrew immediately. The official report recorded, "no determined opposition". A fighting patrol of 12 men sent to destroy the searchlights reached their objective but had to retire before pressing home their attack due to lack of time remaining signalled by the re-call rocket.

On 19 August 1942, the Dieppe raid a major landing took place at the French coastal town of Dieppe. The main force was provided by the 2nd Canadian Infantry Division supported by No. 3 and No. 4 Commando. The mission of No. 3 Commando was to neutralize a German coastal battery, near Berneval-le-Grand, which could fire upon the landing at Dieppe. The landing craft carrying No. 3 Commando, ran into a German coastal convoy. Only a handful of commandos under the second in command, Major Peter Young, landed and scaled the barbed wire-laced cliffs. Eventually 18 commandos reached the perimeter of the battery via Berneval and engaged their target with small arms fire. Although unable to destroy the guns, their sniping of the German gun crews prevented the guns from firing effectively on the main assault. In a subsidiary operation, No. 4 Commando, including the French Troop, No. 10 (Inter-Allied) Commando and 50 United States Army Rangers, landed in force and destroyed their target, the artillery battery at Varengeville and most of No. 4 Commando safely returned to England. After the raid Captain Patrick Porteous No. 4 Commando, was awarded the Victoria Cross.

In September, men from No. 2 Commando took part in Operation Musketoon. This was a raid against the Glomfjord hydroelectric power plant in Norway. The raiders were landed by submarine and succeeded in blowing up pipelines, turbines and tunnels, effectively destroying the generating station and the aluminium plant was shut down permanently. One commando was killed in the raid, and another seven were captured while trying to escape the area, and were taken to Colditz Castle. From there they were taken to Sachsenhausen concentration camp and murdered, the first victims of the Commando Order, which authorised the killing of all captured Commandos. The three remaining Commandos managed to escape to Sweden and eventually returned to No. 2 Commando.

Operation Aquatint on 12 September 1942 was a failed raid by 11 men of No. 62 Commando British Commandos on the coast of occupied France on part of what later became Omaha Beach. Three commandos were killed in the raid, including their commander, Major 'Gus' March-Phillipps and the others became prisoners of war, of which only five would survive the war; one was killed in captivity and the fate of the other two is uncertain.

In November No. 1 and No. 6 Commandos formed part of the spearhead for the Allied landings in Algeria as part of Operation Torch.

=== 1943 ===
The Tunisia Campaign following the Torch landings No. 1 and No. 6 Commandos were involved in first battle of Sedjenane between February and March 1943.

Also in early 1943, No. 5 (Norwegian) Troop, No. 10 (Inter-Allied), worked with No. 12 and No. 14 (Arctic) Commandos raiding the Norwegian coast from their base in Lerwick in the Shetland Islands In April seven men of No. 14 (Arctic) Commando took part in Operation Checkmate a raid on German shipping near Haugesund. They managed to sink several ships using limpet mines, but were captured and eventually taken to Sachsenhausen and Belsen Concentration Camps where they were executed.

In May, the Special Service Brigade, No. 2, No. 3, No. 40 (RM), and No. 41 (RM) Commandos were sent to the Mediterranean to take part in the Allied invasion of Sicily. The two Royal Marine commandos landed ahead of the main force at 03:00 hours.

Starting in September a series of raids were carried out, by men from the two French troops and No. 3 Troop, on the French and Low Countries coastlines. These raids under the code names of Hardtack and Tarbrush were for beach reconnaissance, for the purpose of bringing back photographs and examples of mines and obstacles that had been laid. In one of these raids Hungarian born Lieutenant George Lane (real name Dyuri Lányi) was captured and taken to see Field Marshal Erwin Rommel to be questioned; Lane believed he was not executed under the Commando Order because of his meeting with Rommel. In total 12 men were reported missing during the Hardtack raids and only five were later accounted for. The commando also took over responsibility for small scale parachute operations together with 4 (PARA) Troop, No. 12 Commando in September.

In November, No. 4 Belgian and No. 6 Polish Troops joined the 2nd Special Service Brigade in Italy. Notably the Poles captured a German-occupied village alone when the 2/6th Battalion Queen's Regiment failed to reach a rendezvous on time. Later in the year No. 2 Dutch Troop was sent to the Far East to work with No. 44 (Royal Marine) Commando and No. 5 Commando behind the Japanese lines in the Arakan in Burma. In Burma 142 Commando Company formed part of the Chindits (the 77th Indian Infantry Brigade), and fought in the first long-range Chindit operation behind Japanese lines, codenamed Operation Longcloth. The raid began on 8 February 1943 and lasted for about three months. It inflicted little damage on Japanese supply lines but it did show that British and Indian Army and Indian forces could fight in the jungle as well as or better than the Japanese; this gave a boost to the morale of the Allied forces fighting in the South-East Asian Theatre.

In the India / Burma theatre 142 Commando Company also operated in conjunction with the U.S. unit Merrill's Marauders.

=== 1944 ===
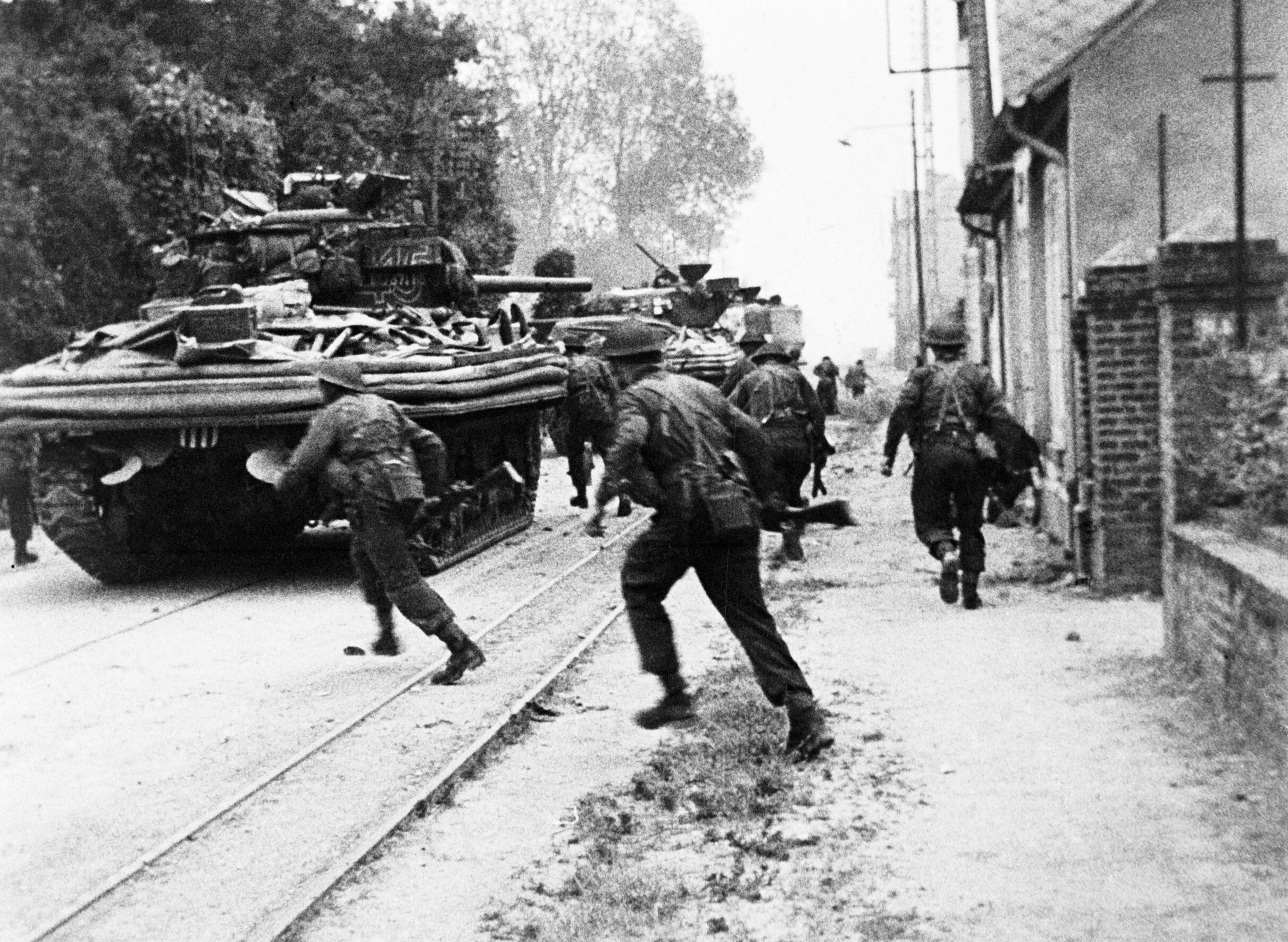
No. 4 Commando engaged in house to house fighting with the Germans at Riva Bella, near Ouistreham. After subduing the opposition, No 4 Commando moved inland to link up with 6th Airborne Division.

1st Special Service Brigade comprising No. 3, No. 4, No. 6 and No. 45 (RM) Commandos landed at Ouistreham in Queen Red sector of Sword Beach. No. 4 Commando were augmented by 1 and 8 Troop (both French) of No. 10 (Inter Allied) Commando and were committed for two months to hold the left flank of the D-Day landings. No. 41(RM) Commando (part of 4th Special Service Brigade) landed on the far right of Sword Beach, where 29,000 men would land. No. 48 (RM) Commando landed on Juno Beach, from Saint-Aubin-sur-Mer to Courseulles-sur-Mer, where 21,400 troops would land. No. 46(RM) Commando (part of 4th Special Service Brigade) landed at Juno to scale the cliffs on the left side of the Orne River estuary and destroy a battery. No. 47(RM) Commando (part of 4th Special Service Brigade) landed on the west flank of Gold Beach and captured Port-en-Bessin.

In November 1944, British Commandos of the 4th Commando Brigade and No. 41 (Royal Marine) Commando were involved in the Battle of Walcheren Causeway, attacking from seaward at Flushing and Westkapelle.

=== 1945 ===
On 1 April 1945, the whole of 2nd Commando Brigade, consisting of Nos. 2, 9, 40 (RM) and 43 (RM), under Brigadier Ronnie Tod were engaged in Operation Roast at Comacchio lagoon, north east Italy. This was the first major action in the big spring offensive to push the Germans back across the River Po and out of Italy. After a fierce three-day battle, the Commandos succeeded in clearing the spit separating the lagoon from the Adriatic, so securing the flank of the 8th Army and fostering the idea the main offensive would be along the coast and not though the Argenta Gap.

A total of 946 prisoners were taken, while three battalions, two troops of artillery and a company of machine gunners were wiped out. In the course of the operation 20 field guns and a number of mortars and rocket launchers were also captured. During the operation, Corporal Tom Hunter of No.43 Commando (RM) earned a posthumous Victoria Cross for conspicuous gallantry when he single-handedly cleared a farmstead housing three Spandau machine guns, then engaged further Spandaus entrenched on the far side of the canal from open ground.

In the Burma Campaign, 3 Commando Brigade comprising No. 5 Army Commando, No 44 RM Commando, No. 42 RM Commando, and No.1 Army Commando, took part in the coastal landings during the Allied Southern Front offensive of 1944/1945. The campaign culminated in the battle of Hill 170 at Kangaw. For his actions there, Lieutenant George Knowland of 4 Troop No 1 Army Commando was awarded the Victoria Cross.

== Bibliography ==
- Chappell, Mike (1996). Army Commandos 1940–1945. Osprey Publishing. ISBN 1-85532-579-9.
- Dunning, James (2003). The Fighting Fourth: No. 4 Commando at War 1940–45. Sutton. ISBN 978-0-7509-3095-6.
- Haskew, Michael E (2007). Encyclopaedia of Elite Forces in the Second World War. Pen and Sword. ISBN 978-1-84415-577-4.
- Jones, Tim (2006). SAS Zero Hour: the Secret Origins of the Special Air Service. Greenhill Books. ISBN 1-85367-669-1.
- Joslen, H. F. (1990). Orders of Battle, Second World War, 1939–1945. Naval & Military Press. ISBN 1-84342-474-6.
- Macksey, Kenneth; Woodhouse, William (1991). The Penguin Encyclopedia of Modern Warfare: 1850 to the Present Day. Viking. ISBN 0-670-82698-7.
- Messenger, Charles (1991). The Last Prussian: A Biography of Field Marshal Gerd von Rundstedt, 1875–1953. Brassey's. ISBN 0-08-036707-0.
- Moreman, Timothy Robert (2006). British Commandos 1940-46. Osprey Publishing. ISBN 1-84176-986-X.
- Morgan, Mike (2000). Daggers drawn: Second World War Heroes of the SAS and SBS. Sutton. ISBN 0-7509-2509-4.
- Parker, John (2000). Commandos: The Inside Story of Britain's Most Elite Fighting Force. Headline. ISBN 978-0-7472-7008-9.
- Saunders, Hilary St. George (1959) [1949]. The Green Beret: The Commandos at War. London: Four Square Books.
- Shortt, James; McBride, Angus (1981). The Special Air Service. Osprey Publishing. ISBN 0-85045-396-8.
- Zuehlke, Mark (2008). Operation Husky: the Canadian invasion of Sicily, July 10 – August 7, 1943. Douglas & McIntyre. ISBN 1-55365-324-6.
