= Operation Collar =

Operation Collar may refer to:

- Operation Collar (convoy), a Second World War Royal Navy operation
- Operation Collar (commando raid), a British commando raid on the coast south of Boulogne-sur-Mer and Le Touquet
