= John Durnford-Slater =

British Army officer

- Born: 1909
- Died: 5 February 1972 (aged 62−63)
- Military career
- Allegiance: United Kingdom
- Branch: British Army
- Service years: 1927–1946
- Rank: Brigadier
- Service number: 41090
- Unit: Royal Artillery
- Commands: No. 3 Commando
- Conflicts: Second World War; Operation Ambassador; Operation Claymore; Operation Archery; Operation Jubilee; Operation Overlord; Operation Devon; Operation Plunder
- Awards: Distinguished Service Order and Bar

Brigadier John Frederick Durnford-Slater, DSO and bar (1909 – 5 February 1972) was a British Army officer who was credited with establishing the first Army commando unit during the Second World War.

An officer in the Royal Artillery who eventually rose to the rank of brigadier, he was responsible for developing many of aspects of the commando concept. Commanding No. 3 Commando he participated in raids on Guernsey, the Lofoten Islands, Vaagso, Dieppe and Sicily. In Italy he commanded the 2nd Commando Brigade that undertook the capture of Termoli, before serving as deputy commander of the Special Service Group, a divisional level headquarters unit that planned and administered all commando operations during Operation Overlord and the advance into Germany.

== Early life ==
Durnford-Slater was born in 1909 to Leonard Slater and his wife Constance (née Pridham) and grew up in Instow, in the north of Devon. (Note: Upon his birth, John's surname was simply Slater, however, after his father's death, it was changed by deed poll to Durnford-Slater following an inheritance to his mother from the Durnford family of Guernsey.) His family had a strong military tradition, his own father had been a regular officer who had been killed on 14 September 1914 while serving with the 2nd Battalion, Royal Sussex Regiment in France during the First World War. Following the death of his father, the family name changed to Durnford-Slater after an inheritance from the Durnford family.

From the outset his mother encouraged him to pursue a career in the army. At the age of 13 Durnford-Slater was sent to Wellington, a school with a long army tradition. Nevertheless, as a teenager Durnford-Slater professed that he had no desire to pursue a military career, indeed, he hated the training that he was required to undertake as part of the Officer Training Corps having difficulty learning drill and constantly drawing the ire of instructors for the poor state of his uniform.

As he grew up he professed a desire to move to Argentina and breed horses, having heard anecdotes of life in South America from people who lived in his village. His mother, however, continued to push him towards a career in the army, hoping that he would follow in his father's footsteps and join the Royal Sussex Regiment. In the end she managed to convince him that a military career was the best option for him given the limited financial resources available to him with which to pursue his business interests.

== Military career ==
=== Early service ===
In 1927, at the age of 18, Durnford-Slater attended the Royal Military Academy, Woolwich and in February 1929 he graduated and was commissioned as a second lieutenant in the Royal Regiment of Artillery. He was also awarded a prize for his performance in the final French exam.

Following this he was posted to India until 1935 when he returned to Britain having served six years overseas. He had enjoyed his time in the subcontinent, finding that he liked the military lifestyle, however, upon his return he found that garrison life in Britain was very different from what he had experienced overseas and for a time he considered resigning his commission and returning to civilian life. His feeling of disenchantment remained until the Munich Crisis in 1938, when he decided that war was inevitable. While in India he was a keen horseman and finished runner-up in the Kadir Cup, he also participated in military races on his return to the UK.

=== Second World War ===
At the outbreak of the war Durnford-Slater, by then a captain, was serving as the adjutant of an anti-aircraft unit in the south-west of England. Initially his unit was the only one in the area and for a time it seemed that there was a possibility for some action, however, they were soon reinforced by other batteries and Durnford-Slater began to think about pursuing other options within the service. When he was posted to a training unit, the 23rd Medium and Heavy Training Regiment, Royal Artillery, in the role of adjutant the prospect for active service seemed unlikely.

In mid June 1940, however, following the lightning advance of the Germans through France and the subsequent Dunkirk evacuation, the British War Office put out a call for volunteers to carry out raids along the coasts of the occupied territories and Durnford-Slater was able to convince his commanding officer to recommend him for the special force that was being raised to do this. Shortly afterwards he was given a brevet promotion to lieutenant colonel and given orders to begin raising and recruiting No. 3 Commando. Although designated No. 3 Commando, No.1 and No. 2 did not exist at the time—the intention being to raise them as airborne units later—and as such Durnford-Slater's unit was the first commando unit raised during the war and Durnford-Slater is considered to be the first British commando of the war.

His appointment came through on 28 June and based in Plymouth, he immediately began the process of recruiting officers for the new unit, drawing personnel from the Southern Command region. Once he had selected the first intake of officers, he then sent them out to recruit the other ranks to fill out the unit. By 5 July 1940, No. 3 Commando was officially in existence.

Within a fortnight Durnford-Slater led a group of 40 men from the unit's 'H' Troop on a probing raid on the German-occupied island of Guernsey, as part of Operation Ambassador. The raid was largely unsuccessful, and indeed momentarily threatened to derail the further employment of the Commandos, however, the lessons learnt from the operation did help in the development of many aspects of the concept which Durnford-Slater set about implementing almost immediately.

In October 1940, No. 3 Commando moved up to the Combined Training Centre that had been established at Inverary in Scotland in order to begin training for possible operations in the Mediterranean. At this time, the Commando units were reorganised and Durnford-Slater reverted to the rank of major as No. 3 Commando was amalgamated with No. 8 (Guards) Commando to form the 4th Special Service Battalion under Lieutenant Colonel Robert Laycock. As part of this organisation, Durnford-Slater had command of 'A' Special Service Company, which was essentially still No. 3 Commando, albeit with a different name.

==== Raids in Norway ====
In March 1941, however, he returned to the role of a lieutenant colonel commanding a full Commando when the battalion organisation was dropped. Shortly after this, Durnford-Slater led a force of 250 men from No. 3 Commando on a highly successful raid on the Lofoten Islands in Norway as part of Operation Claymore. For his part in the raid, he was Mentioned in Despatches.

Following the Claymore raid there was a period of lull in the Commando operations, and while No. 3 Commando was based at Largs, in an effort to find something for his men to do, Durnford-Slater and a number of his officers began planning an unofficial raid on the German embassy in Dublin as they believed that the embassy was transmitting information on the location of Allied convoy movements in the Atlantic. Before this raid could be carried out, however, Durnford-Slater was called to London for a meeting with Admiral Louis Mountbatten who had taken over command of Combined Operations to begin planning for another raid in Norway.

This raid, known as Operation Archery, took place over the course of 26–28 December 1941 and consisted of a diversionary raid on the Lofoten Islands, (Note: This raid was known as Operation Anklet.) followed by an attack on the port of Vaagso and the island of Maaloy by a combined naval and commando force. The Commandos, drawn mainly from No. 3 Commando as well as elements from No. 2, 4 and 6, with Durnford-Slater in tactical command of the raiders ashore around Vaagso, reporting directly to Brigadier Joseph (Charles) Haydon who had overall operational command of the ground forces for the operation. The raid proved to be a success, and for his part Durnford-Slater later received the Distinguished Service Order. The recommendation, written by Haydon, credits Durnford-Slater's "personal courage, complete coolness & quick grasp of the situation" with inspiring the confidence of the men and ensuring all objectives were achieved. It further describes how, when the attack was in danger of stalling, after the leading troops "lost five out of six officers, & nearly 40% of their effective [strength]" he took personal command to restore the situation, and under heavy fire had both his orderlies wounded beside him.

==== Dieppe and Italy ====
In August 1942, Durnford-Slater was involved in Operation Jubilee, where No. 3 Commando was assigned the task of silencing the Goebbels Battery on the eastern flank of the main assault beaches around Dieppe. The convoy that was ferrying the commandos across the Channel was attacked by German warships following a chance encounter, however, and in the confusion that followed the majority of No. 3 Commando, including Durnford-Slater, were unable to get ashore. Many of the landing craft had either been sunk or damaged and forced to return to Newhaven, while Durnford-Slater himself spent the rest of the day watching helplessly from one of the ships as the battle proceeded without him. (Note: A small force of about 120 men from No. 3 Commando managed to land near Le Petit Berneval, however, the majority of them were either killed or captured. A second group of just 20 men landed to the west and managed to advance within 200 yards of the battery, however, due to lack of numbers they were unable to launch an assault on the battery and instead proceeded to harass the gunners for a number of hours and distract them from their purpose of firing on the anchorage before they were forced to withdraw. Saunders 1959, pp. 7–11; pp. 88–90.)

A period of lull followed for Durnford-Slater and his men which enabled him to rebuild the unit after the losses they had suffered at Dieppe. In January 1943, however, the unit received orders to move to Gibraltar where Durnford-Slater had his men carry out a number of reconnaissance operations across the border into Spain in order to gather intelligence before they were subsequently sent to North Africa to prepare for Operation Husky, the invasion of Sicily.

During the invasion, Durnford-Slater personally led No. 3 Commando's assault on an Italian battery north-west of Cassibile on 10 July 1943, before launching another seaborne assault on 13–15 July, this time around Agnone, to capture the Ponte dei Malati, a bridge spanning the Leonardo River to the north of Lentini and 10 miles (16 km) behind the front line as part of the advance on Catania. For his leadership in these operations, he was awarded a Bar to his DSO. The recommendation describes how they had to hold the bridge for 18 hours until relief arrived, in the face of German counterattacks supported by tanks and heavy mortars. According to the recommendation for the award, "Durnford-Slater displayed the greatest courage, determination & tenacity. His complete disregard for personal safety proved an inspiration to his men".

Following the completion of the fighting in Sicily, Durnford-Slater took over operational command of both No. 3 and No. 40 (Royal Marine) Commandos along with the Special Raiding Squadron, operating them as a brigade. In August and September 1943 he commanded them during Operation Baytown, as the Allies commenced their invasion of Italy. In early October he led the detachment in Operation Devon, where they were employed to spearhead the assault on Termoli, on the east coast of Italy, about 120 miles north of Bari. In the end the port was captured largely as a result of Durnford-Slater's commandos. The town was taken despite intelligence failures, it was expected that they would face only administrative units of the German 1st Parachute Division, but in fact 26th Panzer Division were in the area, being rested following the fighting at Salerno; and problems during the landing, some landing craft of 40 Commando and the SRS grounding fifty yards offshore in six feet of water, leading to the loss of all their radios as the men waded ashore. Their success meant 8th Army was able to move forward instead of fighting for the line of the Biferno River, whose mouth was at Termoli. The capture of port closer to the front line also enabled the Allies to shorten their supply lines, and opened a road from Naples to the east coast.

==== D-Day ====
In late October Durnford-Slater was ordered to return to the United Kingdom with No. 3 Commando to begin planning for D-Day. In November 1943, a divisional-sized headquarters unit, known as the Special Service Group took command of all Allied commando forces, which at the time included four independent brigades spread throughout the United Kingdom, Italy and the Far East, and upon his arrival in London, Durnford-Slater was promoted to brigadier and became deputy commander underneath Major General Robert Sturges, Royal Marines.

In this role Durnford-Slater was charged with looking after the interests of the Army Commandos and co-ordinate the Group's planning for Operation Overlord. Prior to the invasion, he set up a planning headquarters with the staff from the 2nd Army in Ashley Gardens in order to ensure that the Group's plans were consistent with those of the main force. On D-Day, he went to France with the headquarters before returning to the United Kingdom in September 1944 when the majority of the commando units were withdrawn from France for rest.

For the rest of the war, he alternated between time at the front in France and then Germany and in the United Kingdom, carrying out varied administration, logistics and planning tasks. When the war finally came to an end, however, he was in Lubeck inspecting the 1st Commando Brigade, to which No. 3 Commando, his first command, was attached.

== Later life ==
With the war over, he reverted to the rank of captain, before being promoted to major in January 1946, and retiring a month later with the honorary rank of brigadier. He maintained his contact with the military, however, and in 1947 went on to the Reserve list, until 1964 when he reached retirement age.

Between 1950 and 1953, John Durnford-Slater was estate bursar and commanding officer of the CCF at Bedford School. In 1953 he had his memoirs published by William Kimber. He was killed on 5 February 1972, when he fell under the Brighton Belle train at Haywards Heath Station. He was survived by his wife Dar (née Ferdinando) and their daughter Jenny. (Note: The reprinted version of Durnford-Slater's memoirs do not elaborate on how this occurred, simply stating that he was "killed", an obituary published in The Times also makes no mention of the cause of death.) (Note: Durnford-Slater's wife was born Gladys Ethel Ferdinando. She was a widow before marrying Durnford-Slater in Bombay, India in 1935 and as such her surname before this second marriage was Farquharson. "Marriages" (Marriages). The Times. Tuesday, 19 February 1935. Issue 46992, col A, p. 1.)

A new edition of his memoirs, titled Commando: Memoirs of a Fighting Commando in World War II, was published by Greenhill Books in 2020 with a foreword by Neil Barber.

== Bibliography ==
- Chappell, Mike (1996). Army Commandos 1940–1945. Elite Series # 64. London: Osprey Publishing. ISBN 1-85532-579-9.
- Durnford-Slater, John (2002) [1953]. Commando: Memoirs of a Fighting Commando in World War Two. London: Greenhill Books. ISBN 1-85367-479-6.
- Ford, Ken (2003). Dieppe 1942. Campaign # 127. Botley, Oxford: Osprey Publishing. ISBN 1-84176-624-0.
- Laffin, John (1999). Raiders: Great Exploits of the Second World War. Sutton. ISBN 978-0-7509-1525-0.
- Moreman, Tim (2006). British Commandos 1940–46. Osprey Publishing. ISBN 978-1-84176-986-8.
- Saunders, Hilary St. George (1959) [1949]. The Green Beret: The Commandos at War. London: Four Square Books. OCLC 1260659.
- Thompson, Julian (2001) [2000 (hardback)]. The Royal Marines—from Sea Soldiers to a Special Force. London: Pan Books. ISBN 0-330-37702-7.
