= 43 Commando Fleet Protection Group =

Force protection formation of the Royal Marines

43 Commando Fleet Protection Group Royal Marines
- Unit badge
- Active: 1943–1946; 1961–1968; 1980 – present
- Country: United Kingdom
- Branch: Naval Service; Royal Marines
- Type: Commando
- Size: 550 personnel
- Part of: United Kingdom Commando Force
- Base: HMNB Clyde
- Nickname: FPG
- Motto: Per Mare Per Terram (By Sea By Land) (Latin)
- Colours (lanyard): Red and old gold
- March: Quick – A Life on the Ocean Wave; Slow – Preobrajensky
- Anniversaries: Lake Comacchio, 3 April 1945
- Website: 43 Commando Fleet Protection Group Royal Marines

Commanders
- Captain General: The King
- Commandant General: General Gwyn Jenkins
- Superior Commander: Commander Operations, Fleet Headquarters
- Current Commander: Colonel Tony de Reya RM MBE

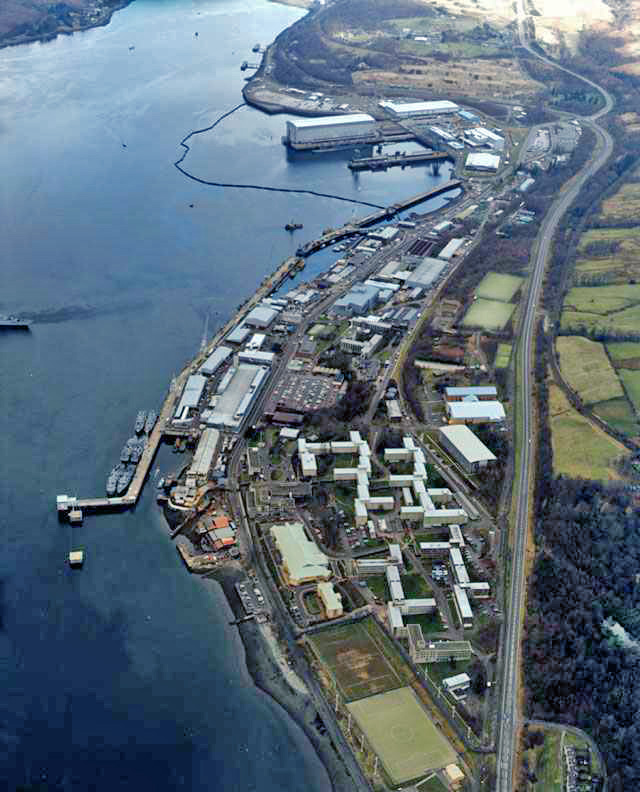
Security of nuclear weapons at Faslane, HM Naval Base Clyde, is part of the Group's responsibilities

The 43 Commando Fleet Protection Group Royal Marines (43 Cdo FP Gp RM), formerly Comacchio Company Royal Marines (1980–1983), Comacchio Group Royal Marines (1983–2001) and Fleet Protection Group Royal Marines (2001–2012), is a 550-man unit of the Royal Marines responsible for preventing unauthorised access to the UK's strategic nuclear deterrent.

The unit, based at HM Naval Base Clyde, is part of United Kingdom Commando Force (UKCF).

It inherited the traditions and battle honours of the Second World War No. 43 (Royal Marine) Commandos.

== History ==
=== Second World War ===
Early Commando units were all from the British Army. In February 1942, the Royal Marines were asked to organize commando units of their own, and 6,000 men volunteered.

In July 1943, 43 Commando was formed, after the conversion of the battalions of the Royal Marine Division into commando units. The initial intake of personnel was drawn from the 2nd Battalion, Royal Marines. Following commando training at Achnacarry in Scotland, the unit consisted of about 450 men organized into a headquarters, five infantry marines troops consisting of three officers and 63 other ranks, along with a heavy weapons troop—armed with Vickers machine guns, 3-inch mortars and 6-pounder anti-tank guns—and a signals platoon.

Along with No. 2, No. 9 and No. 40 (Royal Marine) Commandos, 43 Commando formed the 2nd Special Service Brigade. In 1943–45, No. 43 (Royal Marine) Commando served in Italy, Yugoslavia and Greece.

==== Victoria Cross ====
Corporal Thomas Peck Hunter was posthumously awarded the Victoria Cross for his actions during Operation Roast at Lake Comacchio, Italy, during the Second World War. Hunter cleared a farmhouse containing three MG42 machine-guns on his own, firing a Bren Gun from his hip. Hunter then proceeded to draw enemy fire until most of his troop had taken cover. The commanding officer, Lieutenant Colonel Ian Riches RM, was awarded the DSO in this action. He went on to be Commandant General Royal Marines between 1959 and 1962.

=== Re-formed ===
In 1961, 43 Commando RM was reformed at Stonehouse Barracks "as a further contribution to the forces available for seaborne operations". The unit was disbanded again in 1968.

=== Comacchio Company ===
On 1 May 1980, the Comacchio Company Royal Marines was formed - taking its name from the battle honour "Comacchio, Italy 1945", where Hunter posthumously received the Victoria Cross for his actions. On its formation, Comacchio Company took on the colours and traditions of the then-defunct 43 Commando.

In November 1983, the Comacchio Company RM became Comacchio Group RM. In 1987, Comacchio Group ceased performing the maritime counterterrorism role after a study transferred the task to the newly formed M-squadron of the Royal Marines Special Boat Service (SBS).

=== Fleet Protection Group Royal Marines ===
In March 2001, the Comacchio Group RM was renamed Fleet Protection Group Royal Marines, and restructured into its current organisation, located in Scotland. The Group moved from RM Condor in Arbroath, Angus, where it was co-located with 45 Commando, to HM Naval Base Clyde on the Gare Loch, situated near Helensburgh, Argyll and Bute.

In 2012, FPGRM formally adopted the name 43 Commando Fleet Protection Group Royal Marines.

In 2016, elements of the unit began using the Colt Canada C8 carbine instead of the standard L85A2.

Commandos from 43 Commando regularly train with other forces both inside the UK and other nations including the United States Marine Corps (USMC).

== Tasks and organisation ==
The primary mission is to prevent unauthorised access to the UK's strategic nuclear deterrent through the provision of specialist military capability. Additionally, naval boarding and sniper teams and the Fleet Contingent Troop are deployed world-wide to conduct specialist maritime security tasks in support of the Royal Navy.

43 Commando Fleet Protection Group Royal Marines is a Royal Marine Unit based at HM Naval Base Clyde in Scotland and is part of United Kingdom Commando Force (UKCF), the UK's high readiness expeditionary amphibious warfare force.

As of 2016, 43 Commando Fleet Protection Group Royal Marines has over 550 personnel and is organised into several sub-units:

- HQ headquarters squadron
- O Rifle Squadron
- P Rifle Squadron (reformed in 2018)
- R Rifle Squadron
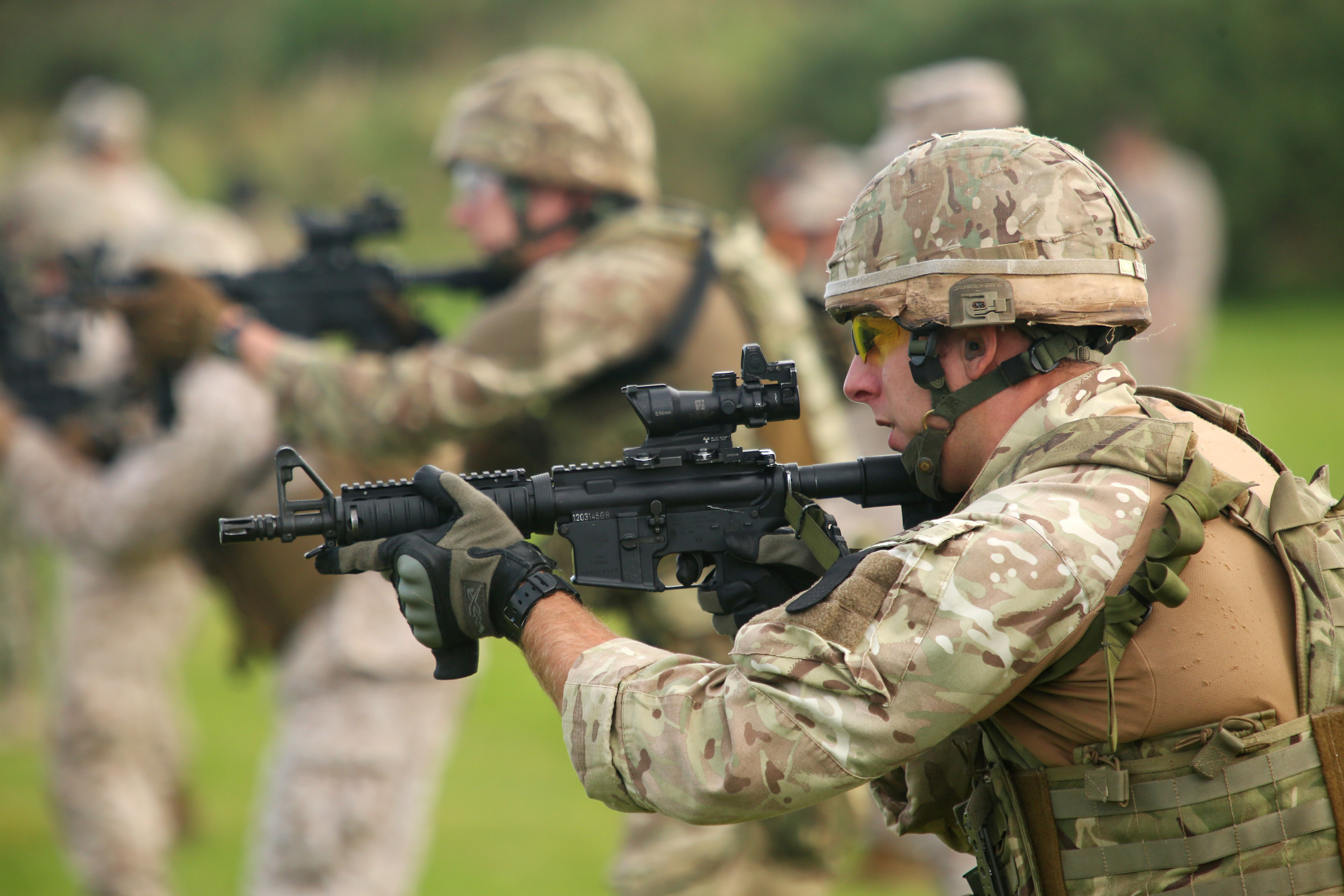
Members of 43 Commando Fleet Protection Group Royal Marines train using L119A1 carbines fitted with a CQB upper receiver.

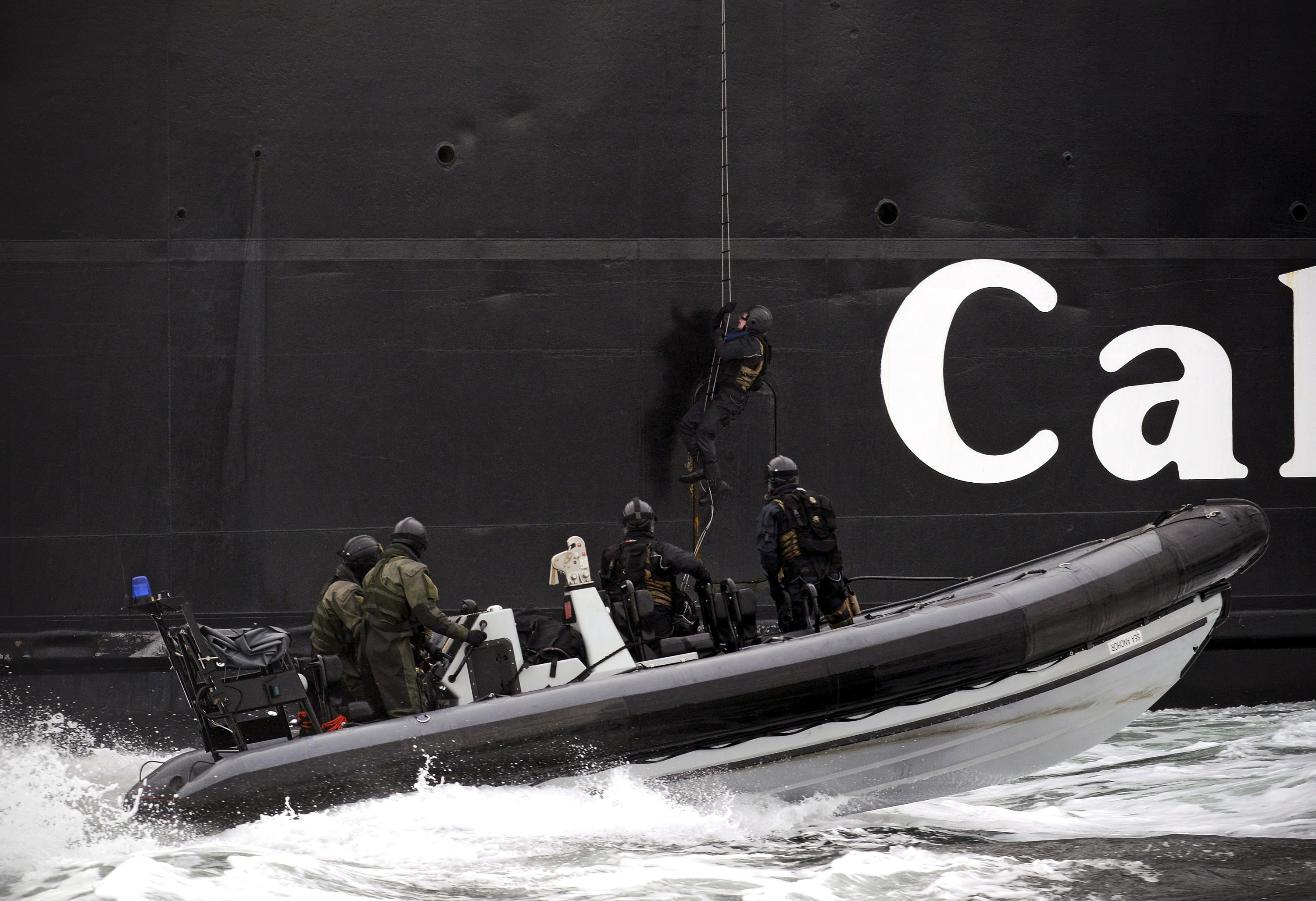
Royal Marines from 43 Commando Fleet Protection Group conducting an ‘Underway Boarding Exercise’ in conjunction with a CalMac ferry, 2015.

== Royal Navy Reserve augmentation ==
Naval ratings of the Royal Naval Reserve (RNR) have been attached to 43 Commando Fleet Protection Group Royal Marines, to support the force protection tasks outside of the United Kingdom. Force protection duties are currently carried out by the standing tasks commando unit, a duty which rotates annually between Commando units.

== See also ==
- Royal Navy
- British Armed Forces
- Nuclear weapons and the United Kingdom
- Marine Corps Security Force Regiment
