= Operation Ambassador =

British Commando raid on Guernsey, 14–15 July 1940

Coordinates: 49.4228°N 2.5307°W

- Part of World War II
| Date | 14–15 July 1940 |
| Location | Guernsey |
| Result | British failure |

Belligerents
| United Kingdom | Germany |

Commanders and leaders
| Ronnie Tod; John Durnford-Slater | Unknown |

Strength
| 140 | 469 |

Casualties and losses
| 4 captured | None |

Operation Ambassador was an operation carried out by British Commandos on 14–15 July 1940 within the context of the Second World War. It was the second raid by the newly formed British Commandos and was focused upon the German-occupied Channel island of Guernsey.

The raiding party consisted of 40 men from the newly formed No. 3 Commando under the command of Lieutenant Colonel John Durnford-Slater, (Note: Some sources state that Durnford-Slater was a major at the time, however, the discrepancy seems to stem from the fact that his rank of lieutenant colonel was a brevet rank, while he held an acting rank of major and substantive rank of captain. Durnford-Slater 2002, p. ix.) and 100 men of No.11 Independent Company under Major Ronnie Tod. (Note: There is a minor discrepancy in the sources. Most sources state 140 men, but Chappell states that this number was actually 139 men in total, with 40 men from No. 3 Commando and presumably only 99 men from No. 11 Ind Coy. Chappell 1996, p. 5.)

Due to a series of mishaps, poor fortune and the haste with which it was planned and implemented, the raid resulted in no immediate military gains for the British, although the experience gained in the mounting and conduct of the operation was to prove invaluable for the success of subsequent Commando operations. In addition to this, the Germans started a process of fortification at high expense and involving diverting resources from defences at other places.

== Background ==
On 30 June 1940 the Germans landed troops on the Channel Islands. Two days later, the British prime minister, Winston Churchill sent a memo to his chief staff officer, General Hastings Ismay, asking him to begin planning an operation for a raid on the islands as soon as possible and stating that he felt that it would be the type of operations that the newly formed Commandos would be suited for. After that, things began moving very quickly. Indeed, the War Office approved the proposal for an operation later that day and shortly after planning began in earnest.

Code named "Ambassador", it was decided that the operation would follow two preliminary operations code named "Anger". The preliminary operations would be undertaken to gather necessary intelligence prior to a raid by 140 men which would land on the island of Guernsey and attack the airfield with the purpose of destroying aircraft and buildings, as well as capturing or killing members of the garrison. The units that were chosen for the raid were 'H' Troop from No. 3 Commando and No. 11 Independent Company. No. 3 Commando, under Lieutenant Colonel John Durnford-Slater, had only just been raised, having completed its recruitment on 5 July, and had not yet begun training, while No. 11 Independent Company under the command of Major Ronnie Tod had been raised earlier in June (Note: No. 11 Independent Company was raised on 14 June from volunteers for commando service and members from the recently disbanded No. 9 Independent Company. Parker 2000, p. 21.) and had a few weeks earlier undertaken Operation Collar, which had been a hastily organised and largely unsuccessful raid on Boulogne. During the planning stage, Durnford-Slater went to London where he worked out most of the details with David Niven, who was then serving as a staff officer in the Combined Operations Headquarters.

On the night of 7/8 July a reconnaissance operation was carried out, when Lieutenant Hubert Nicolle, an officer in the Hampshire Regiment who was originally from Guernsey and first commissioned in the Royal Guernsey Militia, was landed on the island by the submarine HMS H43. Three days later he was picked up and based on the information that he provided it was determined that the garrison on Guernsey consisted of 469 soldiers, concentrated mainly around St. Peter Port and although there were machine gun posts all along the coast, they were sited in a manner that meant that it would take about twenty minutes between an alarm being raised for reinforcements to be dispatched.

== Raid ==
The original plan had been for the raid to be carried out on the night of 12/13 July, however, at the last moment it was put back to 14/15 July. Even then, shortly before embarcation, Durnford-Slater received intelligence that the Germans had reinforced a number of the places where it had been planned to land some of the parties and as such the plan was changed at the last moment. After the details were worked out, final battle preparations were undertaken in the gymnasium at the Royal Naval College, Dartmouth where some of the cadets helped the commandos with loading magazines and helping prepare the Bren guns and Thompson sub-machine guns that had been brought down from London specifically for the operation. (Note: At the time Bren guns and Thompson sub machine guns were in very short supply due to the large amount that had been lost in France following the evacuation of the British Expeditionary Force from Dunkirk. As a result they were only issued for actual operations. Durnford-Slater 2000, p. 24; Parker 2000, p. 15.)

At 17:45 the raiding force embarked upon the two destroyers, HMS Scimitar and HMS Saladin and accompanied by six Royal Air Force air-sea rescue launches, who would take them from the destroyers to the landing beaches, they set out for the island of Guernsey. Due to the loud noise of the engines of the RAF launches, it was arranged that RAF Avro Ansons would fly over the island to disguise the sound of the engines.

Under the plan that Durnford-Slater had worked out he had the troops from the independent company attacking the airfield, while the commandos were to create a diversion. To this end, three landing points were selected; however, in the end only the diversionary force from No.3 Commando, consisting of only 40 men, was able to land successfully, landing at a beach in Telegraph Bay just west of the Jerbourg Peninsula at 00:50 on 15 July, despite a faulty compass on the launch.

One party of No.11 were taken to the wrong island (Sark) as a result of another faulty compass, landing on Little Sark the team explored La Sablonnerie and not finding any Germans returned safely to the destroyer. Another party crashed into a rock and the other two launches broke down after experiencing a series of technical problems.

Although they managed to get ashore—albeit soaking wet—the party from No. 3 Commando failed to find any of the 469-man German garrison. Despite locating a German barracks and a machine gun nest, both had been abandoned prior to their arrival. One islander was encountered only as he had a speech impediment, he was knocked unconscious to keep him quiet. They demolished a loose garden wall to make a small road block. Not hearing any noise from the direction of the airport, they decided to quietly retreat. The rendezvous with the destroyers that were picking them up was at 03:00 and if they were late the destroyers were under orders to leave them behind, so the party subsequently returned to the beach, stopping to cut a couple of telegraph lines on the way. Upon arriving at the landing beach, the raiders discovered that they had to extract themselves by swimming some 100 yards (91 m) out to their boats as the tide had risen too high for their motor craft to beach among the rocks.

At this stage it was discovered that three of the men from 'H' Troop, No. 3 Commando could not swim and had to be left on the beach with additional French currency. Although Durnford-Slater requested that a submarine be sent back for these men, the Admiralty decided that it could not take the risk and as a result the men later surrendered. During the extraction, a dinghy was used to ferry weapons to the boats, but on the fifth excursion it was dashed against a rock and overturned. One of the boat's two occupants, a soldier, was presumed drowned at the time, although later it was reported that he actually managed to get ashore and was subsequently captured.

== Aftermath ==
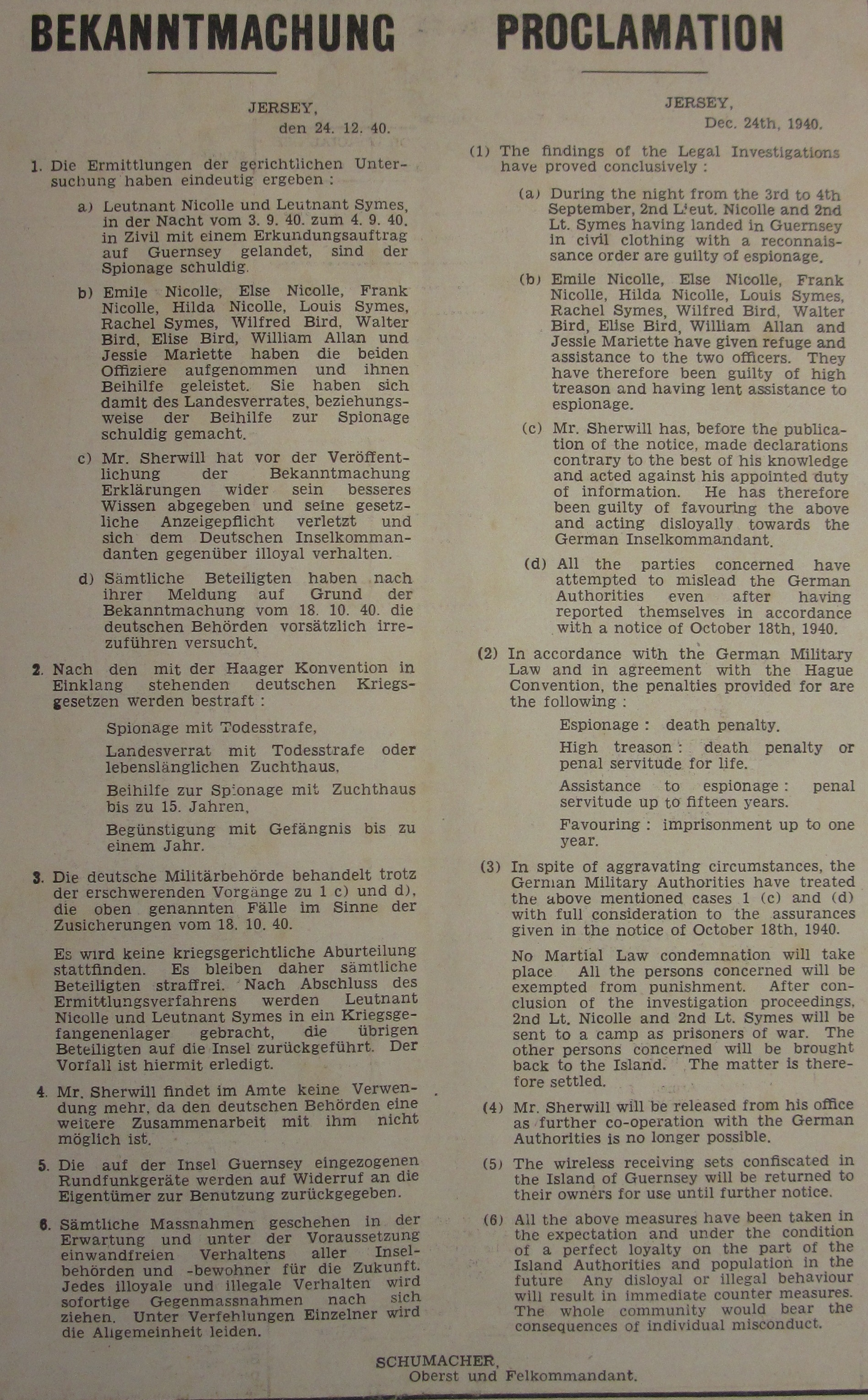
German proclamation of measures against Nicolle, Symes, Sherwill, and others following the raid

The raid was ultimately a failure as none of the objectives were achieved by the British. No casualties were inflicted upon the Germans, no prisoners were taken, and the only damage inflicted was a cut telephone line. Additionally, the quality of the planning and conduct of the operation has been called into question. Much of the equipment used was either not serviceable—faulty compasses, and motor launches that broke down—or inadequate for the job and launches that were unable to come all the way into the beach due to their draught. Also some of the tasks that had been assigned were impractical or had not been rehearsed—the wire intended for use as a road block was too heavy to carry from the beach—and intelligence relating to German dispositions upon the island was at best outdated or completely wrong. The commandos also found they were burdened with equipment that was not of use, including steel helmets, gaiters and an excess of ammunition. Largely this was the result of the haste with which the operation had been conceived and then put together, but it was also indicative of the embryonic status of the raiding and commandos concept.

On the political side, the raid was also a disaster. Churchill was said to have been furious regarding the "comical" way in which the operation was undertaken, and it has been alleged that for some months the whole Commando concept was "in jeopardy" with authorities considering their disbandment, although this did not eventuate. As a concept, the Commandos went on to perform with considerable success later in the war. Indeed, it has been argued by authors such as Durnford-Slater and Parker that the Commandos' future success in operations such as "Overlord" was in part due to the early failures such as "Ambassador" as many lessons were learned that proved vital in the planning and conduct of future Commando operations. According to Richard Strappini, the government's embarrassment of the operation resulted in a lack of the individual acts of bravery being recognised.

Nevertheless, there were widespread changes. The independent companies were in turn disbanded and their personnel used to raise the first 12 commando units. Much work went into the training and planning side of raiding also, and for the next eight months the commandos did little except train. To this end formalised training schemes and schools were established and Churchill sought to invigorate the concept by replacing General Bourne, who had previously been the Director of Combined Operations, with Admiral Sir Roger Keyes.

== Notes ==
Footnotes

Citations
