= Independent company (British Army) =

Units of the English (later British) Army

Independent Companies
- Active: 1940
- Allegiance: United Kingdom
- Branch: Territorial Army
- Type: Light infantry
- Role: Coastal raiding
- Engagements: Norwegian Campaign

Commanders
- Notable commanders: Colin Gubbins

An independent company was originally a unit raised by the English Army, subsequently the British Army, during the 17th and 18th centuries for garrison duties in Britain and the overseas colonies. The units were not part of larger battalions or regiments, although they may have originally been detached from them, and the units would remain permanently assigned to the garrison.

In the 20th century, the name was used for a temporary expeditionary formation of the British Army during the Second World War. Initially, there were ten independent companies, which were raised from volunteers from Territorial Army divisions in April 1940. They were intended for guerrilla-style operations in the Allied campaign in Norway. The companies were disbanded after returning to Britain at the end of the campaign but No. 11 Company was formed from volunteers from the first ten Independent Companies on 14 June 1940 and took part in the first British commando raid, Operation Collar.

After the Second World War, the concept of the independent company was maintained in the airborne forces with the formation of a pair of company-sized units operating independently within larger formations.

== Origins ==
Early in 1940, the British Army had been making plans for a campaign in Norway, ostensibly to support Finland in the Winter War against the Soviet Union, which then had a non-aggression pact with Germany. When the Finns capitulated on 12 March 1940, the troops that were assigned to the operation were instead sent to France. Nevertheless, contingency planning continued. That included MI(R), a department of the War Office responsible for irregular operations, which was asked to plan for raids on the Norwegian coast. The department's head, Colonel J.C.F Holland, summoned Lieutenant Colonel Colin Gubbins, who led MI(R)'s mission in Paris, to prepare and train the troops.

On 9 April, the Germans launched Operation Weserübung by occupying Oslo and Narvik and several other ports in Norway, which took the allies by surprise. On 13 April, Holland submitted MI(R)'s first proposals to the War Office. He intended to break up the Lovat Scouts to form the raiding parties. However, the Scouts' commanding officer, Lieutenant Colonel Leslie Melville, objected and instead Holland proposed to form the Independent Companies.

== Companies ==
Ten companies were formed from volunteers from Territorial Army divisions that were still stationed in Great Britain:

- No. 1 Independent Company formed from 52nd (Lowland) Infantry Division
- No. 2 Independent Company formed from 53rd (Welsh) Infantry Division
- No. 3 Independent Company formed from 54th (East Anglian) Infantry Division
- No. 4 Independent Company formed from 55th (West Lancashire) Motor Division
- No. 5 Independent Company formed from 1st (London) Division
- No. 6 Independent Company formed from 9th (Highland) Infantry Division
- No. 7 Independent Company formed from 15th (Scottish) Infantry Division
- No. 8 Independent Company formed from 18th (East Anglian) Infantry Division
- No. 9 Independent Company formed from 38th (Welsh) Infantry Division
- No. 10 Independent Company formed from 66th Infantry Division

The establishment of each company was 21 officers and 268 other ranks, organised as three platoons, each of three sections. Some personnel from the Royal Engineers and Royal Signals were attached to each company headquarters. As the companies were intended to be mobile in rough terrain and to operate independently for several days, they were lightly equipped. Each company's only heavy weapons were Bren light machine guns, a single Boys anti-tank rifle and some two-inch mortars in a support section. The companies therefore were unsuitable for holding fixed defences or mounting rearguard actions.

Gubbins realised that the soldiers and junior officers of the newly-raised companies were untrained in mountain and irregular warfare. He therefore requested for 20 selected officers of the Indian Army, with experience in the North-West Frontier to be attached to the independent companies. The selected officers flew from Karachi to Britain aboard the Imperial Airways flying boat Cathay.

== Norwegian Campaign ==
Formal approval for the establishment of the independent companies was given only on 20 April, but No. 1 Independent Company had first embarked for Norway on 27 April.

On 2 May, Gubbins was given command of "Scissorsforce", consisting of Nos. 1, 3, 4, and 5 Independent Companies, and ordered to prevent the Germans occupying Bodø, Mo and Mosjøen. Part of the force (Nos. 4 and 5 Independent Companies) arrived at Mosjøen on 8 May. Early on 10 May, they successfully ambushed the leading Germans advancing on Mosjøen from the south but were harassed by Luftwaffe aircraft during the long daylight hours and were outmatched by the main body of German Gebirgsjäger (mountain troops). Exhausted, they were withdrawn by a Norwegian coaster to Bodø on 11 May.

On 10 May also, 300 Gebirgsjäger with two mountain guns disembarked from the commandeered coaster Nordnorge at Hemnesberget, roughly midway between Mosjøen and Mo. A platoon of No. 1 Independent Company and some Norwegian reservists defending the town were outnumbered and forced to escape by boat after a stiff resistance. No. 1 Independent Company and some Norwegian troops attacked the next day but failed to dislodge the Germans, who had been reinforced and resupplied by seaplanes.

Gubbins's force was then placed under the command of 24th (Guards) Brigade at Bodø. The destroyer that carried the brigade's commander, Brigadier William Fraser, was put out of action by the Luftwaffe, and Gubbins assumed command of the brigade. Nos. 1 and 3 Independent Companies of the former "Scissorsforce", reinforced by No. 2 Independent Company, which had recently landed at Bodø, thereafter generally fought in rearguard actions while they were attached to the brigade's infantry units in several actions in Nordland until all British troops were withdrawn from Bodø in the early hours of 1 June.

== Aftermath ==
The ten independent companies were disbanded after the Norwegian campaign. While most of their men were returned to their parent units and formations, calls were being made throughout the army for men to join the new commando units. Those men from the independent companies who volunteered were formed on 14 June into No. 11 Independent Company, with an establishment of 25 officers and 350 other ranks. The company took part in Operation Collar, a raid on the Pas de Calais on 24 June. They also participated in Operation Ambassador in conjunction with No. 3 Commando, in which it was planned that the company would attack an airfield on the German-occupied Channel Island of Guernsey while the Commando secured the landing beach and created a diversion.

After a postponement, the raid commenced on 14/15 July 1940, but faulty compasses on their launches meant that only one boatload from the company actually landed, and even then it was at Little Sark, on the wrong island, where there were no Germans. No. 11 Independent Company was disbanded shortly afterwards and its remaining personnel were incorporated into the new commando units. Gubbins returned to MI(R) and eventually became the director of the Special Operations Executive. Lieutenant Colonel Hugh Stockwell, who had commanded No. 2 Independent Company in Norway, set up the commando training centre at Lochailort before he enjoyed a distinguished record as a brigade and division commander.

== Post-war ==
Although the independent company concept was largely abandoned, a pair of company-sized units were formed after the end of the Second World War to undertake various specialist tasks. Both units, although primarily trained as airborne forces, were exclusively drawn from specific elements of the British Army.

=== No. 1 (Guards) Independent Parachute Company ===
No. 1 (Guards) Independent Parachute Company was formed in 1948 as the remaining element of 1st (Guards) Parachute Battalion. The company served as part of 16 Parachute Brigade, which was the British Army's sole remaining post-war airborne formation. Manned exclusively by soldiers from the Household Cavalry and Brigade of Guards, the company was quickly tasked as 16 Parachute Brigade's pathfinder unit and saw extensive service on operations until it was disbanded in 1975. Both the role and the history of the company were perpetuated by the formation of separate platoons. In 1985, a new Pathfinder Platoon was established as part of the Parachute Regiment within 5 Airborne Brigade, and in the late 1990s, a platoon within B Company of 3rd Battalion, Parachute Regiment was designated as 6 (Guards) Platoon, manned exclusively by men recruited from the Guards Division and Household Cavalry.

=== Gurkha Independent Parachute Company ===
In 1963, a new company-sized unit of the Brigade of Gurkhas, the Gurkha Independent Parachute Company, was formed to serve as part of 17th Gurkha Division, the formation operating in Malaysia. The new company was formed from volunteers from the infantry regiments and corps units of the Brigade of Gurkhas, and was primarily tasked with airfield seizure, but during its time in Malaysia, it operated in a variety of roles from conventional infantry to special reconnaissance. When the British Army left Malaysia and the Brigade of Gurkhas was deployed to Hong Kong in 1971, the company was disbanded.

== See also ==
- British Army Independent Companies in South Carolina
- Independent companies (Australian)
- Independent Highland Companies
- Norwegian Independent Company 1
- Special Service Brigade

== Sources ==
- Adams, Jack (1989). The Doomed Expedition: The Campaign in Norway, 1940. Pen & Sword Military. ISBN 9780850520361.
- Durnford-Slater, John (2002) [1953]. Commando: Memoirs of a Fighting Commando in World War Two. London: Greenhill Books. ISBN 1-85367-479-6.
- Moreman, Timothy Robert (2006). British Commandos 1940–46. Osprey Publishing. ISBN 1-84176-986-X.
- Peterson, Lawrence (2020). Operation Colossus: The First British Airborne Raid of World War II. Greenhill Books. ISBN 978-1784383787.
- Wilkinson, Peter; Astley, Joan Bright (2010). Gubbins and SOE. Barnsley: Pen & Sword Military. ISBN 978-1-84884-421-6.
