= 2nd Special Service Brigade =

2nd Special Service 2nd Commando Brigade
- Active: 1943–1946
- Allegiance: United Kingdom
- Branch: British Army; Royal Navy
- Type: Commando
- Role: Coastal raiding Assault infantry Special operations
- Part of: Combined Operations
- Engagements: Second World War

Commanders
- Notable commanders: Ronnie Tod

Insignia
- Combined Operations Tactical recognition flash

The 2nd Special Service Brigade was formed in late 1943 in the Middle East and saw service in Italy, the Adriatic, the landings at Anzio and took part in operations in Yugoslavia. On 6 December 1944 the Brigade was renamed 2nd Commando Brigade, removing the title Special Service and its association with the Schutzstaffel.

== Italian Campaign ==
The brigade as a formation, was not involved in Operation Husky, the Allied invasion of Sicily, but 40 RM Commando was involved in the assault landings as Army Troops. In Operation Shingle, the assault at Anzio, No. 9 (Army) Commando and No. 43 (Royal Marine) Commando were the only units involved. The whole brigade was involved in the final offensive of the Italian Campaign.

In 1945 the brigade was involved in the Lake Comacchio battle, Operation Roast, where Corporal Thomas Peck Hunter of 43 Commando was posthumously awarded the Victoria Cross for conspicuous Gallantry in single-handedly clearing a farmstead housing three Spandau machine guns after charging across 200 metres of open ground firing his Bren gun from the hip, then moving to an exposed position to draw fire away from his comrades by engaging further Spandaus entrenched on the far side of the canal. After Operation Roast the brigade was involved in the follow-up actions until the German surrender.

The brigade remained in the area on security duties until it was disbanded in 1946

== Formation ==
- Brigadier Ronnie Tod
  - No. 2 Commando
  - No. 9 Commando
  - No 40 Royal Marine Commando
  - No 43 Royal Marine Commando

By the Battle of Monte Cassino the order was:

- Brigadier T. B. L. Churchill
  - No. 9 Commando
  - No. 10 (Inter Allied) Commando
  - No 40 Royal Marine Commando
  - No 43 Royal Marine Commando

== Battle honours ==
The following Battle honours were awarded to British Commandos during the Second World War.

- Adriatic
- Alethangyaw
- Aller
- Anzio
- Argenta Gap
- Burma 1943–45
- Crete
- Dieppe
- Dives Crossing
- Djebel Choucha
- Flushing
- Greece 1944–45
- Italy 1943–45
- Kangaw
- Landing at Porto San Venere
- Landing in Sicily
- Leese
- Litani
- Madagascar
- Middle East 1941, 1942, 1944
- Monte Ornito
- Myebon
- Normandy Landing
- North Africa 1941–43
- North-West Europe 1942, 1944–1945
- Norway 1941
- Pursuit to Messina
- Rhine
- St. Nazaire
- Salerno
- Sedjenane 1
- Sicily 1943
- Steamroller Farm
- Syria 1941
- Termoli
- Vaagso
- Valli di Comacchio
- Westkapelle

== See also ==
- 1st Special Service Brigade
- 3rd Special Service Brigade
- 4th Special Service Brigade
- British Commandos
