= Operation Roast =

1945 military operation

- Part of the Spring 1945 offensive in Italy
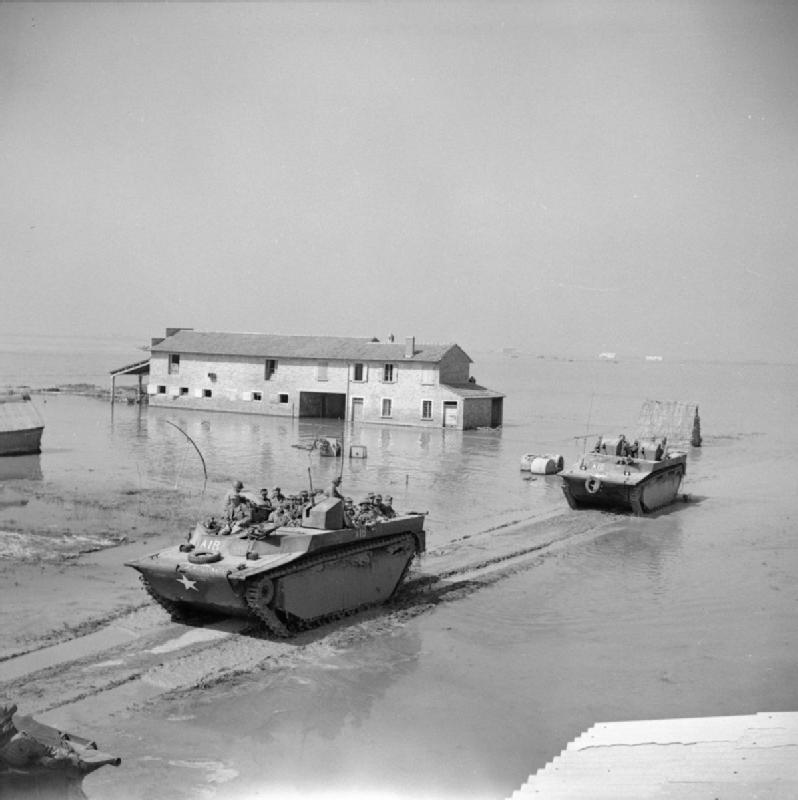
- Buffalo amphibians transport German prisoners through a flooded landscape south of Lake Comacchio.
Date	1–2 April 1945
Location	Comacchio, Northern Italy
Result	British victory

Belligerents
United Kingdom	Germany

Commanders and leaders
(United Kingdom) Ronnie Tod	(Nazi Germany) Ralph von Heygendorff

Units involved
(United Kingdom) 2nd Commando Brigade	(Nazi Germany) 162nd Turkoman Division (Elements)

Strength
2,300 men	1,200 men

Casualties and losses
180 casualties	946 prisoners

Operation Roast was a military operation undertaken by British Commandos, at Comacchio lagoon in north-east Italy, during the Spring 1945 offensive in Italy, part of the Italian Campaign, during the final stages of Second World War.

== Background ==
This was the first major action in the Allied 15th Army Group's big spring offensive to push the German Army back to and across the River Po and out of Italy. The breakthrough on the British Eighth Army's front was to be made through the Argenta Gap, crossing the Rivers Senio and Santerno towards the Po at Ferrara and releasing armour to swing left and race across country to meet the advancing U.S. Fifth Army completing the encirclement of the German divisions defending Bologna.

On 1 April 1945 the whole of 2nd Commando Brigade was engaged in the operation. The brigade comprised No. 2, No. 9, No. 40 Royal Marine Commando and No. 43 (RM) Commando under the command of Brigadier Ronnie Tod.

The Comacchio lagoon is a vast area of shallow brackish water stretching from the River Reno, in the south, to over the town of Comacchio, in the north, and past Argenta in the west. This lagoon (much smaller today due to land reclamation in the 1980s) is separated from the Adriatic Sea, to the east, by a narrow strip of land called a spit no more than 2 ½ kilometres wide with three canals linking the two bodies of water.

The Germans had approximately 1,200 men entrenched there. The Commandos were to clear the spit, securing the flank of the Eighth Army, and thus foster the idea the main offensive would be along the coast and not though the Argenta Gap.

No. 40 Commando (RM) conducted a feint attack to the south, crossing the River Reno and clearing and holding its north bank. No. 40 (RM) was supported by the 28th Garibaldi Brigade (Partisans), Royal Artillery, and the armour of the North Irish Horse. No. 43 Commando (RM) was to attack up a tongue of land to the extreme east, which forms the south bank of the Reno estuary, and when secured, cross the mouth of the Reno and turn back south west and clear the Reno's north bank moving towards one flank of No. 40 (RM). No. 2 and No. 9 Commando were to cross the lagoon from the southwest, to points around the middle of the spit. No.2 was to land above the Bellocchio Canal and thereafter head south and capture the two bridges across it and prevent German reinforcements crossing. No. 9 Commando were to land south of the canal then head south along the lagoon's shore and down the centre of the Spit to clear all positions towards the new line held by No. 40 (RM).

== Operation ==
The operation started on the evening of 1 April with engagement to start shortly after midnight. The lagoon crossing (marked in advance though not too successfully by Combined Operations Pilotage Party 2 and M Squadron, Special Boat Service), took far longer than planned due to the exceptionally low water level and exceptionally muddy lagoon bottom, which was as deep as chest high. The Commandos struggled through the muddy waste all night, manhandling their boats, and eventually reached the Spit at first light, over 4 hours behind schedule. Exhausted and covered in glutinous slime they pressed home their attacks. Nos. 2, 40 and 43 Commandos all made their objectives relatively as expected although the Germans succeeded in blowing-up one bridge before it was captured by No.2 Commando. No. 9 Commando initially made good progress until No. 5 and No. 6 Troops (especially 5 Troop), became seriously pinned down across a killing ground while attempting to capture the enemy position 'Leviticus', (all physical references were given biblical names in this operation). 1 and 2 Troops made good progress down the centre of the Spit and when advised of the situation of 5 and 6 Troops, bypassed Leviticus in order to turn about. They laid smoke, and conducted a bayonet charge, from the southeast. The German position was overrun despite the smoke clearing too quickly exposing the Commandos during the last 150 metres. Routed German defenders who had fled north, fell into the waiting Bren guns of 6 Troop. The bayonet charge was accompanied by 1 Troop's piper playing 'The Road to the Isles'.

No. 2 Commando captured 115 German prisoners and No. 9 Commando captured 232. No. 9 Commando lost 9 men killed and a further 39 wounded, of which 8 dead and 27 wounded came from No. 5 Troop, over half their number. The operation carried the frontline forward seven miles.

That evening No. 9 and No. 43 Commandos moved up to the bridges on the Bellocchio Canal, held by No.2 Commando. The following day, 3 April, Royal Engineers made serviceable the blown bridge and the Commandos moved over the canal, supported by tanks of the North Irish Horse. No. 2 Commando advanced north on the lagoon side, the western flank, while No.43 Commando moved along the eastern flank, the Adriatic side. No. 9 Commando was placed in reserve, with the intention the commando would execute an attack on Port Garibaldi after the next canal, the Valetta Canal, had been captured.

The north bank of the Valetta was found to be very heavily defended, requiring a full-scale attack, which was later conducted by the 24th Guards Brigade. The respective Commandos cleared all positions up to the Valetta Canal. During this, on the eastern flank, Corporal Thomas Hunter, of No. 43 Commando (RM), earned a posthumous Victoria Cross for conspicuous Gallantry. Hunter single-handedly cleared a farmstead housing three German MG 42s, after charging across 200 metres of open ground firing his Bren gun from the hip. Hunter then moved to an exposed position to draw fire away from his comrades, by engaging more MG 42 positions that were entrenched on the far side of the canal. Anders Lassen, a Danish major (temporary rank) of the SBS, was also awarded a posthumous Victoria Cross for his actions during Operation Roast on 8 April 1945 at Lake Comacchio.

== Aftermath ==
The 2nd Commando Brigade had succeeded in taking and clearing the entire spit, securing the eastern flank of the Eighth Army. In the course of the operation 946 prisoners were taken. It was later discovered that German losses were so heavy that they equated to the complete loss of three infantry battalions, two troops of artillery, and a company of machine gunners. Twenty field guns and a number of mortars and rocket launchers were also captured. Lieutenant-General Sir Richard McCreery, commanding the British Eighth Army, sent a message to Brigadier Tod proclaiming: "you have captured or destroyed the whole enemy garrison south of Port Garibaldi."

== See also ==
- Anders Lassen
- Gothic Line
- Italian Campaign (World War II)
