= Ronnie Tod =

British army officer (1905–1975)

- Born: 3 November 1905
- Died: 5 April 1975 (aged 69)
- Military career
- Allegiance: United Kingdom
- Branch: British Army
- Service years: 1925–1948
- Rank: Brigadier
- Service number: 32187
- Unit: Argyll and Sutherland Highlanders
- Commands: No. 9 Commando; 2nd Special Service Brigade
- Conflicts: Second World War; Operation Collar; Operation Ambassador; Operation Shingle; Spring 1945 offensive in Italy
- Awards: Commander of the Order of the British Empire; Distinguished Service Order & Bar

Brigadier Ronald John Frederick Tod CBE, DSO* (3 November 1905 – 5 April 1975) was a British Army officer who was instrumental in the development of the British Commandos during the Second World War.

== Early life and career ==
Tod was born on 3 November 1905. On graduation from Royal Military College, Sandhurst he was commissioned into the Argyll and Sutherland Highlanders as a second lieutenant on 29 January 1925. On 14 December 1932 (now a lieutenant) he was seconded for service with the Colonial Office, joining 4th Battalion, Nigeria Regiment, Royal West African Frontier Force. He was promoted captain on 6 June 1935, and took command of one of the battalion's companies. His secondment ended on 1 August 1938, and he returned to the UK, taking up regimental duties with 1st Battalion, Argyll & Sutherland Highlanders in early 1939.

== Second World War ==
In March 1940, following the outbreak of the Second World War, Tod volunteered to join the Independent Companies being raised for the Norwegian campaign. He was promoted to acting major on 2 April and became Officer Commanding No. 6 Independent Company on 25 April. He held that post until June when he was tasked with raising No. 11 Independent Company. (Note: No. 11 Independent Company was raised on 14 June from volunteers for commando service and members from the recently disbanded No. 9 Independent Company) As commander of this company, he led them on two "commando" raids shortly afterwards, one to Boulogne in France known as Operation Collar, and Operation Ambassador, which was a raid on the German occupied Guernsey. These were the first two such raids carried out by British commandos during the war. Just before the second of these raids he was confirmed as a temporary major on 2 July 1940.

Later, on 20 January 1942 Tod was promoted to acting lieutenant-colonel, his majority was made substantive on 29 January, and his acting rank was made temporary on 20 April. Later in the year he took command of No. 9 Commando. In late 1943 No. 9 Commando was detailed to take part in the Italian Campaign. Tod was later commended for his leadership during a raid across the river Garigliano on 29/30 December 1943 and during Operation Shingle, the Allied amphibious attack on Anzio on 22 January 1944. In the follow-up to the landings, the commando was ordered to take two hills to the north of Monte Ornito on the night of 23/24 February 1944. For his leadership during the attack, Tod was awarded the Distinguished Service Order on 29 June 1944.

The recommendation for the award describes the events of the night. The commando left its start lines at 19:30, and at about 21:30 came under heavy mortar and machine gun fire. Tod undertook a personal reconnaissance, and the ensuing attack captured a German pill box and 23 men. The commando resumed its journey towards its objective, but immediately came under heavy artillery and mortar fire which continued to build in intensity as they approached the main objective, "Point 803". As Tod gave orders for the main attack to begin, four out of five troop leaders, the intelligence officer, and the regimental sergeant major were all killed or wounded by the shelling. Tod retained control, ordering the leading troop to make the attack, supported by two other troops, while the remaining two troops were to take up covering positions to the south, where they would hopefully be out of the majority of the shelling. At this point, Tod himself was wounded in both arms and both legs, but still managed to order his adjutant forward to take command of the attack. Tod then lost consciousness for about ten minutes, but after coming round, began to oversee the evacuation of the wounded. The troops detailed to attack the objective managed to attain it, but were taking heavy casualties, so Tod ordered a retreat to defensive positions on the southern slope of Mount Ornito. Tod was among the last group to fall back, and had to be supported by the adjutant as they made their way back. He remained in command until 10:30 the following morning when his brigade commander ordered him to seek medical attention. According to the recommendation he "undoubtedly saved a critical situation and had a very steadying influence on his unit". Another officer, George Davy, later described how that morning Tod was far more concerned about the injuries to his RSM than he was by his own wounds.

Just under a month later, on 19 March 1944, the commando was ordered to carry out a diversionary attack on a dry valley in the Campo di Carne area, and for his leadership on this occasion Tod was awarded a Bar to his DSO on 20 July 1944. Again the recommendation for the award describes events. The commando's attack began at 02:00, they entered the valley and began to clear it, but it soon became apparent that the defending force was considerably larger than anticipated. Later intelligence showed that they had been facing a whole German battalion. Realising that further progress along the valley would be impossible, Tod ordered his men to take up defensive positions. They held these until the following evening, despite being under fire from three teams, and one particularly strong counterattack by the Germans. Tod was painfully wounded in the early afternoon, but continued to lead from the front. During the German counterattack, German grenades were exploding in his command position. With nightfall, the commando withdrew, bringing in all their wounded. The recommendation especially mentions Tod's "complete disregard for his own personal safety", and his "outstanding display of coolness, courage and leadership at a time when such qualities were most urgently required."

Tod then served in the Greek islands with Foxforce in the summer of 1944, when 9 Commando was made part of 2nd Special Service Brigade under the command of Land Forces Adriatic, led by George Davy. Davy ordered the commando to Kythera, ready for a move to the Peloponnese in anticipation of the German withdrawal from Greece. Here, British forces were being sucked into the emerging Greek Civil War, and often found themselves between opposing communist and anti-communist Greek forces. They managed to defuse many of these potential conflicts, saving many lives in the process. Finally they were ordered to take two islands off Piraeus in order to provide security for Royal Navy minesweepers operating in the area in preparation for the arrival of larger British force under Ronald Scobie. Orders that they were not to enter Athens itself did not reach them, and Tod ensured that the airfield and various strategic points in Athens were under British control prior to Scobie's arrival. Tod was awarded the freedom of the city by Archbishop Damaskinos of Athens, and Davy credited him as "one of the two British officers who kept Greece on the free team of the Iron Curtain". Tod was then promoted to acting colonel, and appointed brigadier in command of the 2nd Special Service Brigade on 18 October 1944. With them he returned to Italy to lead them in the Spring 1945 offensive and until the end of the war. For this, and in particular the capture of Comacchio, he was appointed Commander of the Order of the British Empire on 20 September 1945.

== Retirement ==
On 7 August 1948 Tod retired with the rank of honorary brigadier. He remained in the reserve of officers until 3 November 1955. He died on 5 April 1975.

== Notes ==
Footnotes

Citations
