= No. 2 Commando =

- Active: 1940–1946
- Country: United Kingdom
- Branch: British Army
- Type: Commando
- Role: Coastal raiding force Assault Infantry
- Size: Battalion
- Part of: Combined Operations
- Engagements: Second World War: St Nazaire Raid; Salerno landings; Operation Devon; Battle of Lake Comacchio; Operation Mercerised

Commanders
- Notable commanders: Lieutenant Colonel Augustus Charles Newman VC OBE TD; Lieutenant Colonel Jack Churchill DSO* MC*; Lieutenant Colonel Francis West Fynn MC

Insignia
- Combined Operations Shoulder Patch

No. 2 Commando was a battalion-sized British Commando unit of the British Army during the Second World War. The first No.2 Commando was formed on 22 June 1940 for a parachuting role at Cambrai Barracks, Perham Down, near Tidworth, Hants. The unit at the time consisted of four troops: 'A', 'B', 'C' and 'D'. Eventually 11 troops were raised. On 21 November, it was re-designated as the 11th Special Air Service (SAS) Battalion and eventually re-designated 1st Parachute Battalion. After their re-designation as the 11th SAS Battalion, a second No. 2 Commando was formed. This No. 2 Commando was the leading commando unit in the St Nazaire Raid and suffered heavy casualties. Those who made it back from St Nazaire rejoined the few who had not gone on the raid, and the commando was reinforced by the first intake of volunteers from the new Commando Basic Training Centre at Achnacarry. No. 2 Commando then went on to serve in the Mediterranean, Sicily, Yugoslavia, and Albania, before being disbanded in 1946.

== Background ==
The commandos were formed in 1940, by the order of Winston Churchill the British Prime Minister. He called for specially trained troops that would "develop a reign of terror down the enemy coast". At first they were a small force of volunteers who carried out small raids against enemy occupied territory, but by 1943 their role had changed into lightly equipped assault Infantry which specialised in spearheading amphibious landings.

The man initially selected as the overall commander of the force was Admiral Sir Roger Keyes himself a veteran of the landings at Galipoli and the Zeebrugge raid in the First World War. Keyes resigned in October 1941 and was replaced by Admiral Louis Mountbatten.

By the autumn of 1940 more than 2,000 men had volunteered for commando training, and what became known as the Special Service Brigade was formed into 12 units called commandos. Each commando would number around 450 men commanded by a lieutenant colonel. They were subdivided into troops of 75 men and further divided into 15-man sections. Commandos were all volunteers seconded from other British Army regiments and retained their own cap badges, with the exception of No 2 Commando who adopted the fighting knife as their cap badge, and remained on their regimental roll for pay purposes. Initially commando training was done on a unit basis with selected officers and nco's attending STC Lochailort for specialist training, returning to their units to pass on the skills learnt. From February 1942 the then STC at Achnacarry which was being used as a Holding wing for Lochailort, was renamed the Commando Depot ( later redesignated as the Commando Basic Training Centre) and became the centre for all Commando training. Initially the volunteers went through a six-week intensive commando course at Achnacarry, in the Scottish Highlands. Training concentrated on fitness, speed marches, weapons training, map reading, climbing, small boat operations and demolitions both by day and by night.

By 1943 the commandos had moved away from small raiding operations and had been formed into brigades of assault infantry to spearhead future Allied landing operations. Three units were left un-brigaded to carry out smaller-scale raids. In 1943 the commando formation was also standardised, into a small headquarters, five fighting Troops, a Heavy Weapons troop, and a signals platoon. The fighting Troops consisted of 65 men of all ranks divided into two 30-man sections which, in turn, were divided into three ten man sub-sections. The Heavy Weapons Troop was made up of 3 inch Mortar and Vickers machine gun teams.

== Operational history ==
The first No 2 Commando, under the command of Lieutenant Colonel Jackson, did not carry out any operations before being turned over to parachute duties - it was subsequently taken prisoner of war in Operation Compass. After the formation of the 11th SAS Battalion a new No. 2 Commando was formed, under the command of Lieutenant Colonel Augustus Charles Newman, from a new batch of volunteers. The first action that men from No. 2 Commando were involved in was two troops supporting No. 3 Commando in the Vaagso raid in December 1941. The next action involving men of No. 2 Commando was Operation Musketoon in September 1942. This was a raid against the Glomfjord hydroelectric power plant in Norway. The raid, commanded by Captain Graeme Black, MC, landed by submarine and succeeded in blowing up pipelines, turbines and tunnels, effectively destroying the generating station; the associated aluminium plant was shut down permanently. One commando was killed in the raid; another seven were captured while trying to escape the area and were taken to Colditz Castle. From there they were taken to Sachsenhausen concentration camp and executed, the first victims of Adolf Hitler's Commando Order. The three remaining commandos managed to escape to Sweden, eventually returning to No. 2 Commando.

=== St Nazaire raid ===
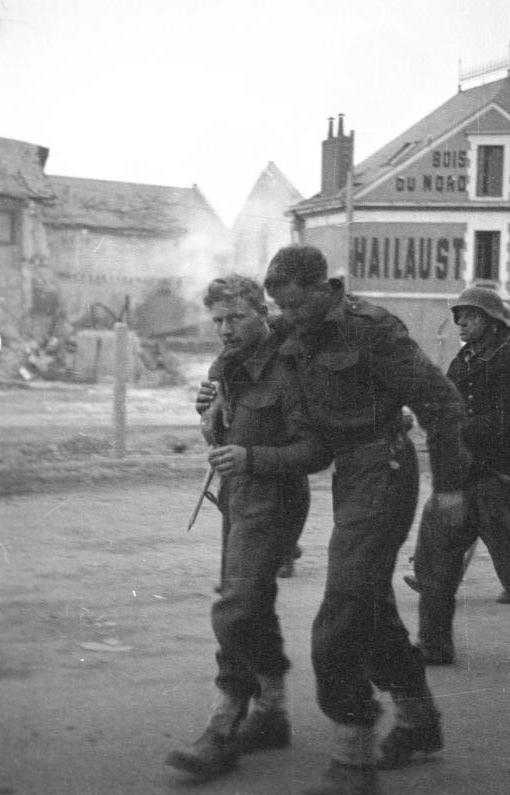
Commandos captured after the St Nazaire Raid.

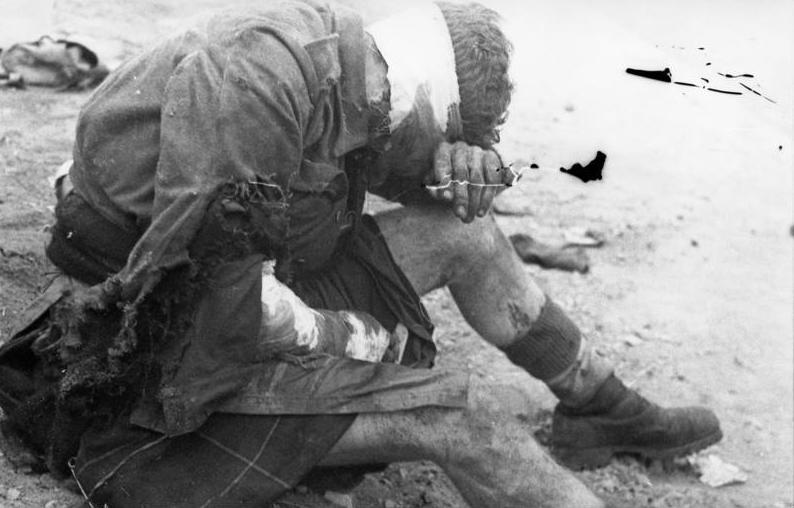
A wounded Highlander POW of Captain Roy Detachment after the St Nazaire Raid.

The St Nazaire Raid (Operation Chariot) was a seaborne attack on the heavily defended docks of St. Nazaire in occupied France on the night of 28 March 1942. The raid has since been called "The greatest raid of all". This was a combined operation undertaken by Royal Navy and Commando units. The main commando force was provided by No. 2 Commando with supporting demolition parties from other commando units. The intention of the raid was to destroy the dry dock which would force any large German warship in need of repairs, such as the Tirpitz, to return to home waters rather than seek safe haven along the Atlantic coast. Of the 600 men who left the port of Falmouth, Cornwall, England, on the raid only 225 would return.

The main commando force was 100 men from No.2 Commando. In addition to demolition tasks, they were to assault the harbour gun positions and provide covering fire for the demolition parties. Demolition Parties from No.2 Commando were supported by those drawn from No. 1, No. 3, No. 4, No. 5, No. 9 and No. 12 Commando. The raid was considered a success even with 25% of the force killed and most of the rest captured. Commando Commanding Officer Lieutenant Colonel Newman and his surviving troops were captured trying to escape the town into open country, when they ran out of ammunition. For his part in the raid Newman was awarded the Victoria Cross. A posthumous Victoria Cross was awarded after the war to Sergeant Thomas Durrant of No. 1 Commando for his part in the raid, upon recommendation by Newman.

=== Mediterranean theatre ===
With the capture of Lieutenant Colonel Newman at St Nazaire the commando unit received a new commanding officer, Lieutenant Colonel Jack Churchill, in April 1942. The commando was sent to the Mediterranean Theatre as part of 2nd Special Service Brigade and in July 1943 landed at Catania during the Allied invasion of Sicily. No. 2 Commando had a quiet time in the Sicily campaign and their only noteworthy action was landing in advance of the British Eighth Army at Scaletta about 15 miles (24 km) south of Messina on 15 August. Here they engaged the German rearguard and then on 16 August were involved in house to house fighting in Scaletta itself.

=== Salerno ===
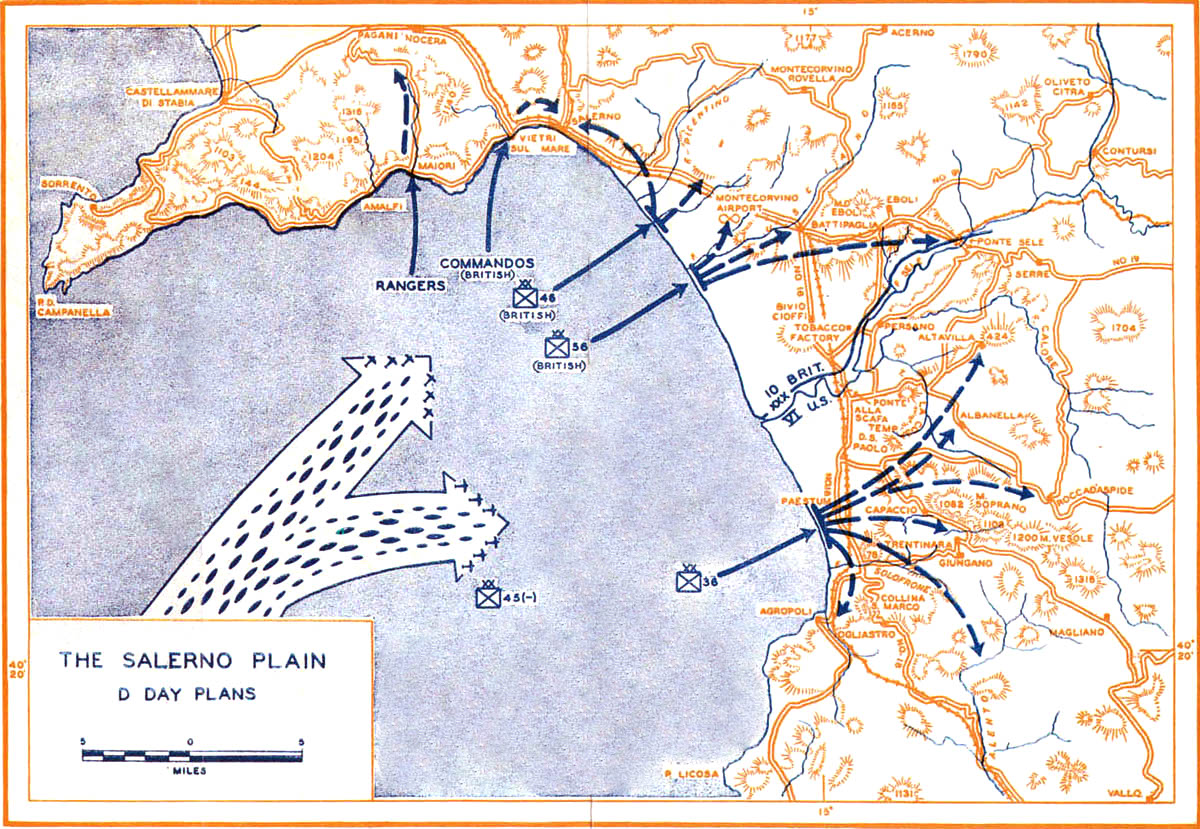
Salerno D-Day plan.

After Sicily was secured, the Allied invasion of Italy followed, beginning 3 September 1943. No. 2 Commando landed at Vietri sul Mare at 03:30 hours, their initial target was a German gun battery. After the commandos scaled the cliffs they discovered the battery was undefended; they moved towards Vietri itself, and the town was secured two hours later. Establishing their headquarters there, they then opened Marina beach for further landings.

No. 2 Commando was next ordered to capture a German observation post outside of the town of La Molina which controlled a pass leading down to the Salerno beach-head. No. 2 and No. 41 (Royal Marine) Commandos, infiltrated the town and captured the post, taking 42 prisoners including a mortar squad. On 11 September the commandos made contact with the U.S. Army Rangers who had landed to their west. On 13 September the commando defended the village of Dragone against the attacking German paratroopers and panzergrenadiers. The battle cost the commando 28 dead and 51 wounded. After a day's rest following the battle the commando moved to Mercatello, about three miles east of Salerno. Together with No. 41 (RM) Commando, they were tasked by Brigade to "sweep the area and clean out the German forces". Having completed the requested "sweep", the commando returned, bringing with them 150 captured Germans.

Both commandos were then ordered back to occupy the area known as the "pimple". Over the next days the commando losses grew and included the then-Duke of Wellington. Finally relieved on 18 September they were withdrawn to Sicily. During the Salerno operations No. 2 and No. 41 (RM) Commandos had 367 killed, wounded or missing out of the 738 who had made the landing.

=== Yugoslavia ===
A depleted No. 2 Commando landed on the Yugoslavian island of Vis 16 January 1944; almost half the commando, consisting of replacements and training staff, remained in Italy. They would remain in the area for the next six months and carried out a number of operations including raids on German garrisons, attacking shipping, making assaults on fixed positions and even helping in the construction of an airfield. Between 26 January and 4 February the commando attacked the German garrison near Milna on the island of Hvar four times. On 19 March the 110 men from No. 2 Commando attacked the village of Grohote killing six and capturing 102 Germans with the loss of one man. By May 1944 No. 2 Commando had been joined on the island of Vis by No. 40 (Royal Marine) Commando, No. 43 (Royal Marine) Commando, some men from the Highland Light Infantry and a Royal Artillery detachment. On 2 June Lieutenant Colonel Jack Churchill, in command of both Royal Marine commandos and a group of Yugoslav Partisans in an assault on German fortifications, was captured after having been knocked unconscious. He was replaced as commanding officer by Lieutenant Colonel Francis West Fynn. After the commando marched past Marshal Josip Broz Tito at an airfield they had helped construct on 23 June they returned to Italy.

=== Albania ===
On their return from Yugoslavia the commando were based near Monopoli in Italy; they recruited new men and carried out parachute training. On the night 28/29 July 250 men from No. 2 Commando landed at Spilje in Albania; their objective was a German position near the village of Himare. After withdrawing they estimated that 100 Germans had been killed; the commando lost 29 dead and 61 wounded. On 22 September No. 2 Commando raided Albania again; their objective this time was to capture the port town of Sarande. The Commando landed on a beach 6 miles (9.7 km) north of Sarande and soon came under artillery fire. Believing the German garrison to consist of 200 men they discovered that the true German strength was 2000 men. Requested reinforcements from No. 40 (Royal Marine) Commando arrived 24 September. Sarande was captured by the combined force on 9 October. With the capture of the town, the German garrison on Corfu was cut off and surrendered to the commandos in November.

=== Comacchio ===
On their return to Italy No. 2 Commando and the rest of 2 Commando Brigade was gathered together for Operation Roast the battle at Comacchio lagoon. Their task was to capture a spit of land which extended from Lake Comacchio to the Adriatic Sea, with possible further exploitation northwards. No. 2 Commando started the attack at 19:00 hours 1 April 1945 by boat across Comacchio lagoon; they reached the opposite shore at 05:00 hours 2 April and approached the Germans from the rear and started their attack. All the Brigade objectives were achieved, with all the German forces south of Porto Garibaldi captured or destroyed. Fighting continued until mid April when No. 2 Commando were withdrawn having lost 23 men in the operation. The German forces in Italy surrendered on 2 May 1945.

== Legacy ==
After the Second World War all the British Army Commandos were disbanded and the commando role was taken over by the Royal Marines. However the present day Parachute Regiment, Special Air Service, and Special Boat Service can all trace their origins to the commandos.

== Battle honours ==
The following Battle honours were awarded to the British Commandos during the Second World War.

- Adriatic
- Alethangyaw
- Aller
- Anzio
- Argenta Gap
- Burma 1943–45
- Crete
- Dieppe
- Dives Crossing
- Djebel Choucha
- Flushing
- Greece 1944–45
- Italy 1943–45
- Kangaw
- Landing at Porto San Venere
- Landing in Sicily
- Leese
- Litani
- Madagascar
- Middle East 1941, 1942, 1944
- Monte Ornito
- Myebon
- Normandy Landing
- North Africa 1941–43
- North-West Europe 1942, 1944–1945
- Norway 1941
- Pursuit to Messina
- Rhine
- St. Nazaire
- Salerno
- Sedjenane 1
- Sicily 1943
- Steamroller Farm
- Syria 1941
- Termoli
- Vaagso
- Valli di Comacchio
- Westkapelle
