= Operation Archery =

WWII British Combined Operations raid on Norway

- Part of World War II
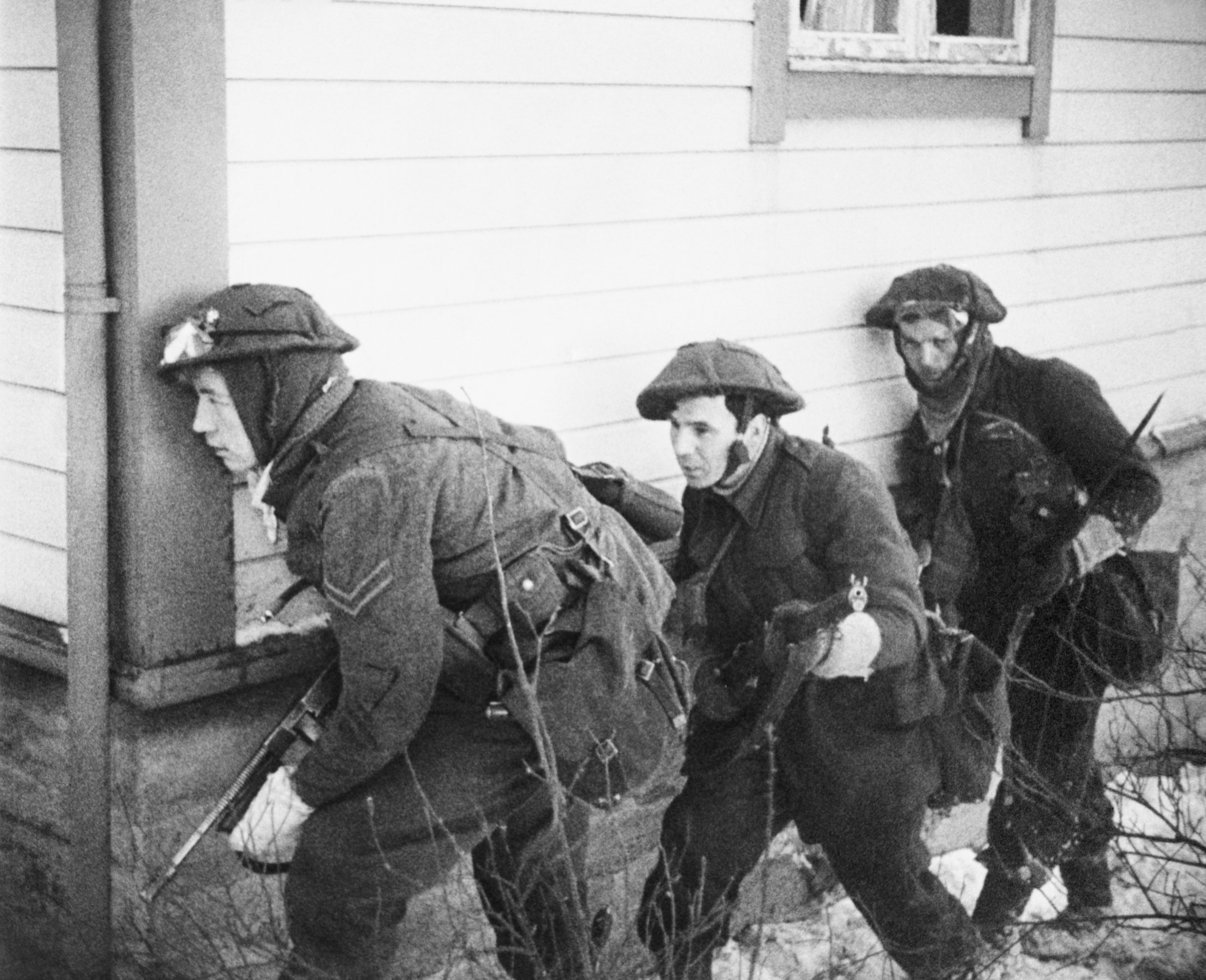
- Commandos in action during the raid
Date	27 December 1941
Location	Vågsøy, Norway 61°58′9.48″N 05°04′59.52″E
Result	Allied victory

Belligerents
United Kingdom; Norway	Germany

Commanders and leaders
John Durnford-Slater; Jack Churchill; Martin Linge †	Kurt Woytasch

Strength
1 cruiser; 4 destroyers; unknown number of aircraft; 570 men	coastal artillery; unknown number of ships; 150 infantry; 50 sailors; 1 tank; 100 labourers

Casualties and losses
22 killed; 57 wounded; 1 cruiser lightly damaged; 8 aircraft lost	120 killed; 98 captured; 10 ships sunk
- 1 civilian killed
- Vågsøy, Norway

Operation Archery, also known as the Måløy Raid, was a British Combined Operations raid during World War II against German positions on the island of Vågsøy, Norway, on 27 December 1941.

British Commandos of No. 3 Commando, two troops of No. 2 Commando, a medical detachment of No. 4 Commando, a demolition party from 101 Troop (canoe) of No. 6 Commando, and a dozen Norwegians from Norwegian Independent Company 1 conducted the raid. The Royal Navy, led by the light cruiser HMS Kenya, with the destroyers HMS Onslow, Oribi, Offa and Chiddingfold, provided fire support. The submarine HMS Tuna was in support as the force navigational check. Prince Charles and Prince Leopold transported the troops. Also in support were Royal Air Force bombers and fighter-bombers.

== Objectives ==
Central to the operation was the destruction of fish-oil production and stores which the Germans used in the manufacture of high explosives. Another intention was to cause the Germans to maintain and increase forces in Norway, which would reduce forces deployed on the Eastern Front, thereby giving a numerical advantage to Allied forces.

The commando force of 570 troops was divided into five parties to

1. Secure the area north of the town of Måløy in Sør-Vågsøy Municipality (south Vågsøy) and engage any enemy reinforcements
2. Subdue and secure Måløy town
3. Eliminate the enemy on Måløy Island which dominated the town
4. Eliminate the enemy strongpoint at Holvik west of Måløy
5. Provide a floating reserve offshore

== Raid ==
The dawn landing was preceded by a very effective naval bombardment and objectives were achieved, except in Måløy. German opposition in the town was much stiffer than expected as, unknown to the British, a Gebirgsjäger (mountain troops) unit of experienced troops from the Eastern Front was there on leave. The defenders' experience in sniping and street fighting caused the operation to develop into a bitter house-to-house battle. The British commander, John Durnford-Slater, called on the floating reserve and troops from Vågsøy Island. Several local citizens assisted the commandos by acting as porters for ammunition, grenades and other explosives and in carrying away the wounded.

At around 14:00, the commandos started their withdrawal having destroyed four factories, the fish-oil stores, ammunition and fuel stores, the telephone exchange and various military installations, leaving much of the town in flames. The naval assault force of one cruiser and four destroyers had sunk 10 vessels, some found in the act of being scuttled to prevent capture. Technical difficulties had prevented the German coastal artillery from being fully effective, with one of their three 130 mm guns scoring one hit on the cruiser.

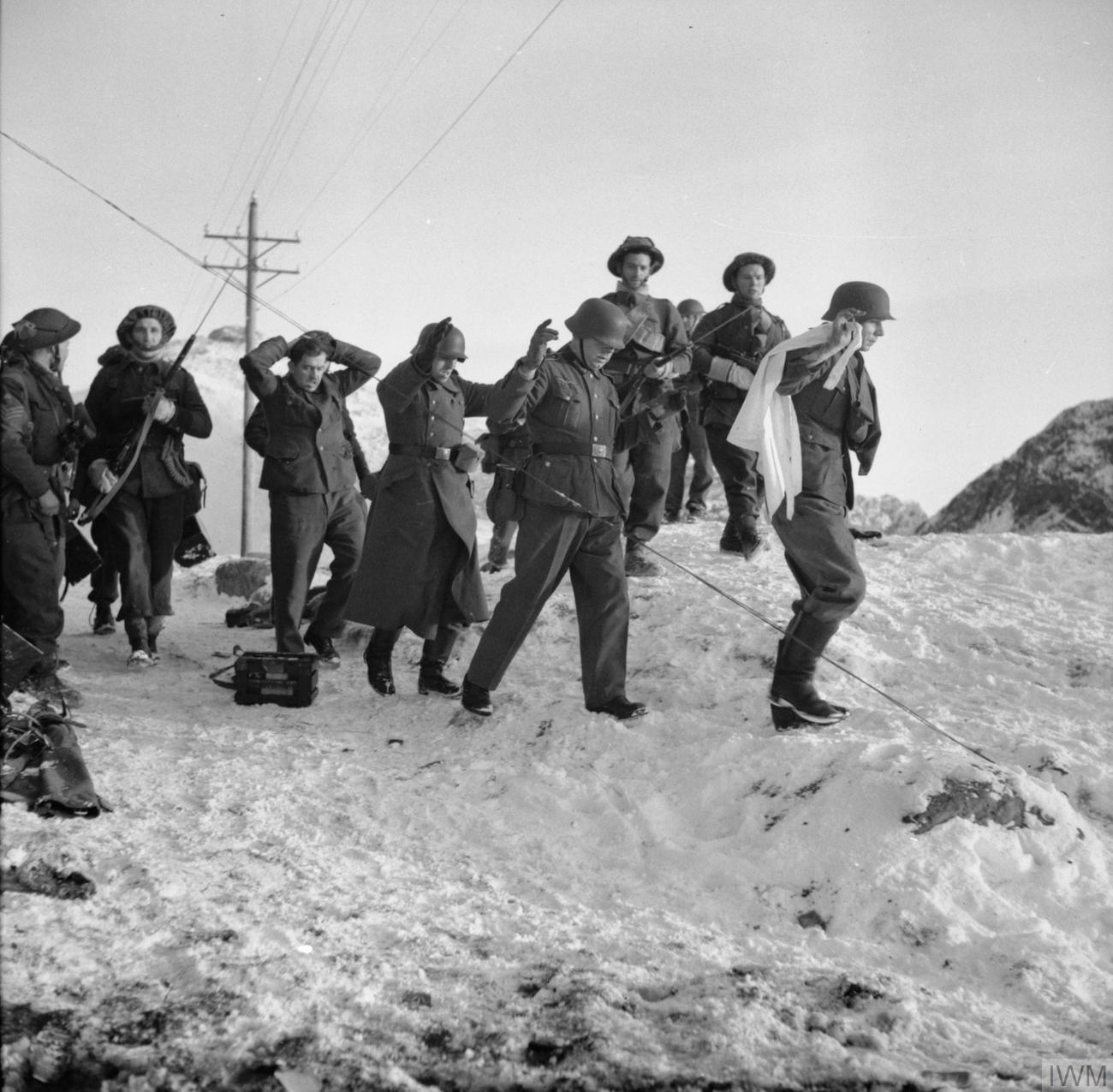
Commandos with POWs

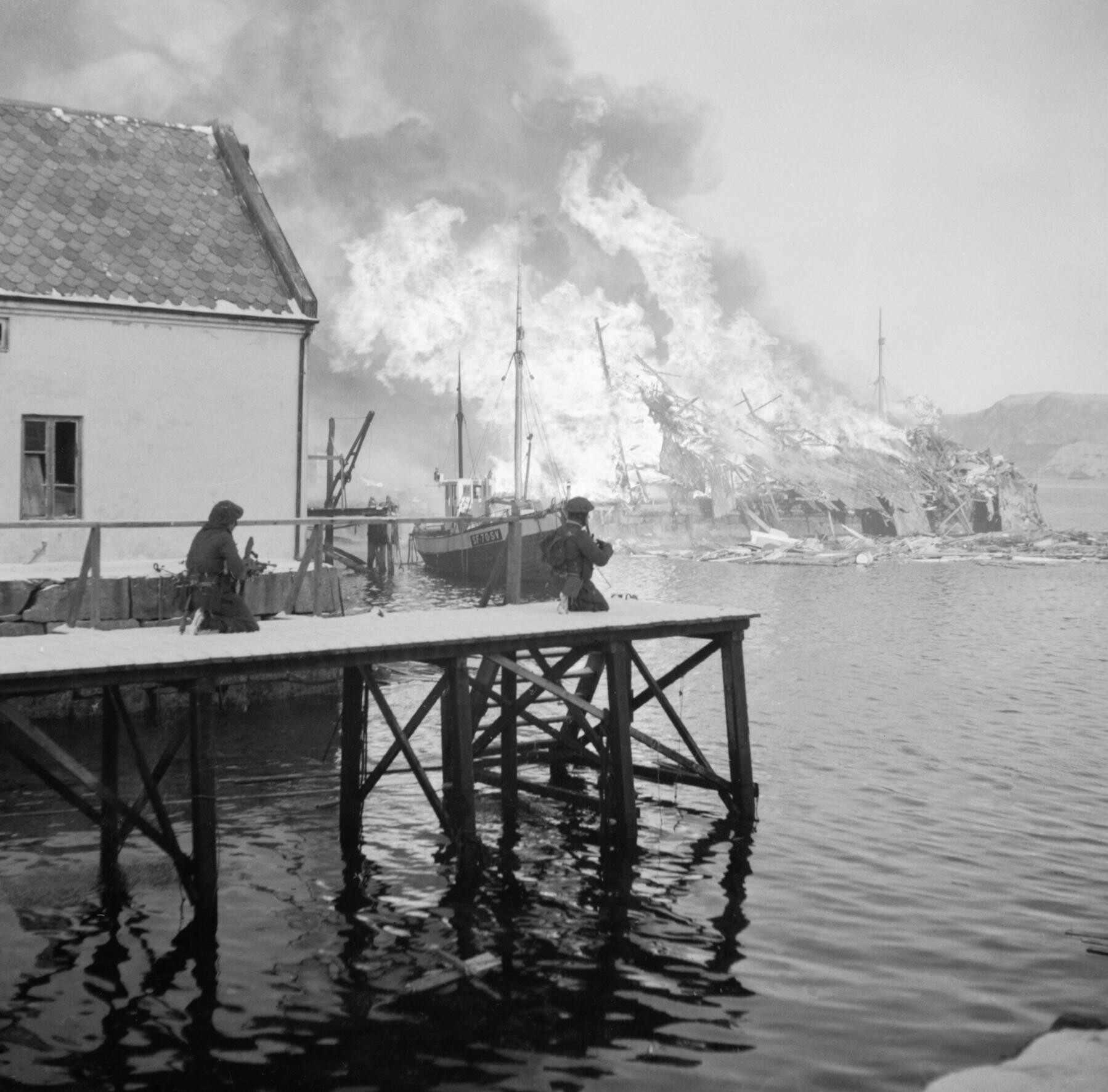
British troops watch an oil factory burn

== Aftermath ==
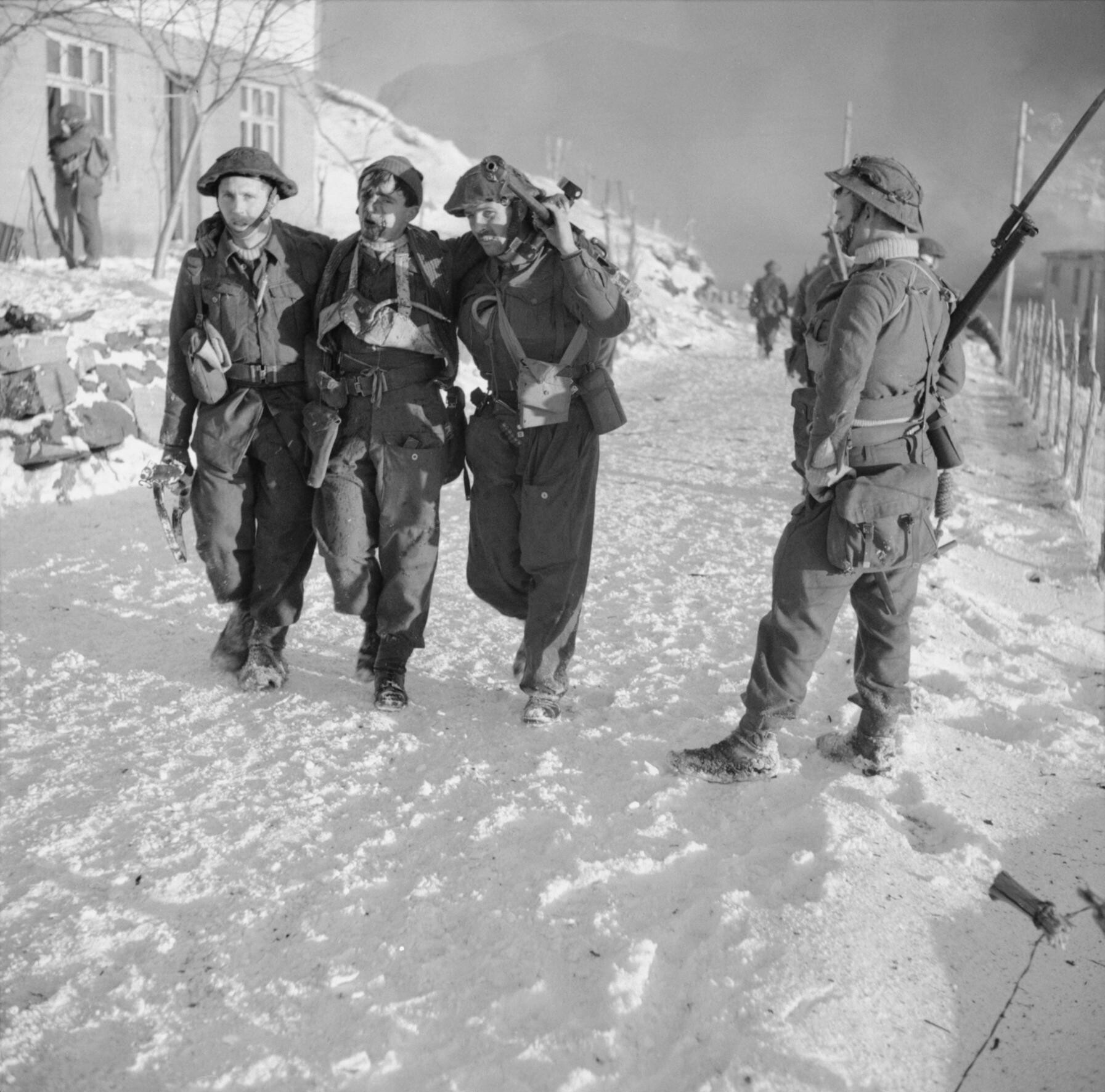
Wounded British officer in Norway

No Royal Navy ships were lost but the navy suffered four men killed and four wounded. The Commandos sustained 17 killed and 53 wounded. The commander of the Norwegian Independent Company 1, Captain Martin Linge, was killed in an attack on the local German headquarters and eight Royal Air Force aircraft were shot down. (A Norwegian civilian was hit by shrapnel during the raid, and died from the resulting injuries the following night). The commandos accounted for at least 120 defenders killed and returned with 98 prisoners and a complete copy of the German Naval Code. Several Quislings and over 70 loyal Norwegians (Jøssing) were also brought back. In conjunction with this raid, Operation Anklet was mounted by No. 12 Commando on the Lofoten Islands as a diversion. The raid was enough to persuade Adolf Hitler to divert 30,000 troops to Norway and to build more coastal and inland defences.
