= Operation Collar (commando raid) =

1940 British raid on Pas-de-Calais department during the German invasion of France

- Part of Second World War, the North West Europe Campaign
- Map of France the Pas-de-Calais highlighted in red
Date	24/25 June 1940
Location	Neufchâtel-Hardelot; Stella Plage; Berck; Le Touquet
Result	Inconclusive

Belligerents
United Kingdom	Germany

Commanders and leaders
Major Ronnie Tod	Unknown

Strength
115 officers and other ranks	Unknown

Casualties and losses
One wounded	Two dead

Operation Collar was the first commando raid conducted by the British forces during the Second World War. The location selected for the raid was the Pas-de-Calais department on the French coast. The British Commandos had not long been formed and were not yet trained and the operation was given to No. 11 Independent Company under the command of Major Ronnie Tod.

The raid's objective was the reconnaissance of four locations and the capture of prisoners. Over the night of 24/25 June 1940, 115 men of No. 11 Independent Company carried out the operation but they failed to gather any intelligence or damage German equipment; their only success was in killing two German sentries.

== Background ==
After the British Expeditionary Force had been evacuated from Dunkirk in 1940, Prime Minister Winston Churchill called for a force to be assembled and equipped to inflict casualties on the Germans and bolster British morale. Churchill told the joint Chiefs of Staff to propose measures for an offensive against German-occupied Europe, and stated: "They must be prepared with specially trained troops of the hunter class who can develop a reign of terror down the enemy coast."

One staff officer, Lieutenant-Colonel Dudley Clarke, had already submitted such a proposal to General Sir John Dill, the Chief of the Imperial General Staff. Dill, aware of Churchill's intentions, approved Clarke's proposal. The Commandos came under the operational control of the Combined Operations Headquarters. The man initially selected as the commander was Admiral Sir Roger Keyes, a veteran of the Gallipoli Campaign and the Zeebrugge Raid in the First World War.

In 1940, the call went out for volunteers from among the serving Army soldiers within certain formations still in Britain, and men of the disbanding divisional Independent Companies originally raised from Territorial Army divisions who had seen service in the Norwegian Campaign. (Note: The first 10 independent companies were raised from volunteers in second line Territorial Army divisions in April 1940. They were intended for guerrilla style operations in Norway following the German invasion. Each of the 10 companies initially consisted of 21 officers and 268 other ranks.) By the autumn of 1940 more than 2,000 men had volunteered for commando training.

Under pressure from Winston Churchill to start raiding operations, Combined Operation Headquarters devised Operation Collar. The objective of Collar was to be a reconnaissance of the French coast and to capture prisoners. The raid was to take place just three weeks after Operation Dynamo, the evacuation of the British Expeditionary Force from Dunkirk, and the French had just signed the Second Armistice at Compiègne with Germany on 22 June 1940. The new British Commandos were not yet adequately trained and most units were still short of troops. An independent company of those which were being absorbed into the commandos was selected. The unit chosen was No. 11 Independent Company, under the command of Major Ronnie Tod of the Argyll and Sutherland Highlanders. No. 11 Company had been raised after the other Independent Companies on 14 June 1940. They were formed by asking for volunteers from the men already serving in the other companies and had an establishment of 25 officers and 350 other ranks.

== Mission ==
Having been selected to carry out the first commando raid on occupied France, No. 11 Independent Company was moved from its base in Scotland to the south coast British port of Southampton. On arrival it conducted a number of exercises against a local infantry battalion on the River Hamble. During the exercise the men discovered the boats they had been supplied with were not good enough to transport them across the English Channel. Having no other transport of their own, the Royal Air Force (RAF) was approached for the use of four of its air sea rescue boats based at Dover, Ramsgate and Newhaven.

The raid would be carried out by 115 officers and other ranks, who were divided into four groups. Each group would be landed on one of the target beaches at Neufchâtel-Hardelot, Stella Plage, Berck and Le Touquet. They were to spend no more than 80 minutes ashore before returning to their boats. The RAF boats were not equipped for a mission like this and lacked exact navigation equipment and the compasses were known to be unreliable. Crossing the channel they also came to the notice of patrolling RAF aircraft who, not being aware of the mission, came in close to investigate. At around 02:00 hours on 24 June 1940, the boats reached France and put their men ashore.

The group that landed at Le Touquet had the Merlimont Plage Hotel as an objective. Intelligence had suggested that the Germans were using the hotel as a barracks. When the group reached the hotel they discovered it was empty and the doors and windows boarded up. Unable to find another target, they returned to the beach, only to discover their boat had put back out to sea. During the wait, two German sentries stumbled on the group and were quietly bayonetted. Another German patrol approached across the sand dunes and the group was forced to swim out to the boat, leaving its weapons behind.

The group that landed at Hardelot penetrated several hundred yards inland and returned to its boat without meeting any Germans. The men that landed at Berck discovered a seaplane anchorage but it was too heavily defended for them to risk an attack. The final group landed at Stella Plage under the command of Tod. It encountered a German patrol and in the short exchange of fire that followed, one man was slightly wounded.

== Aftermath ==
After the raiders returned to England, the Ministry of Information issued a communique:

"Naval and military raiders, in cooperation with the RAF, carried out successful reconnaissances of the enemy coastline: landings were effected at a number of points and contacts made with German troops. Casualties were inflicted on the enemy, but no British casualties occurred, and much useful information was obtained".

Collar met with mixed success: two German sentries were killed, and the commandos' only casualty was Lieutenant-Colonel Dudley Clarke, along as an observer, who received a slight wound at Stella Plage. Despite the limited success of the first commando operation, within a year Adolf Hitler when talking about the commandos referred to them as "terror and sabotage troops" who he said "acted outside of the Geneva convention". The German propaganda machine called them "murderous thugs and cut throats" who killed soldiers and civilians indiscriminately, preferring to murder their enemies rather than take prisoners.

== Bibliography ==
- Chappell, Mike (1996). Army Commandos 1940–1945. Osprey Publishing. ISBN 1-85532-579-9.
- Haining, Peter (2004). Where the eagle landed: the mystery of the German invasion of Britain, 1940. Robson. ISBN 1-86105-750-4.
- Haskew, Michael E (2007). Encyclopaedia of Elite Forces in the Second World War. Pen and Sword. ISBN 978-1-84415-577-4.
- Moreman, Timothy Robert (2006). British Commandos 1940–46. Osprey Publishing. ISBN 1-84176-986-X.
- Rankin, Nicholas (2009). A Genius for Deception: How Cunning Helped the British Win Two World Wars. Oxford University Press. ISBN 978-0-19-538704-9.
