= Cassibile =

Cassibile may refer to:

- Cassibile (village), a village and frazione of the comune of Syracuse, Sicily
  - Armistice of Cassibile, armistice between Italy and the Allies of World War II
- Cassibile (river), a river of the province of Syracuse, in Sicily
- Cassibile, archaeological site (Bronze-Iron Ages)
