= Giuseppe Di Giacomo =

Italian philosopher (born 1945)

Giuseppe Di Giacomo (born 1 January 1945 in Avola, Italy) is an Italian philosopher and essayist.

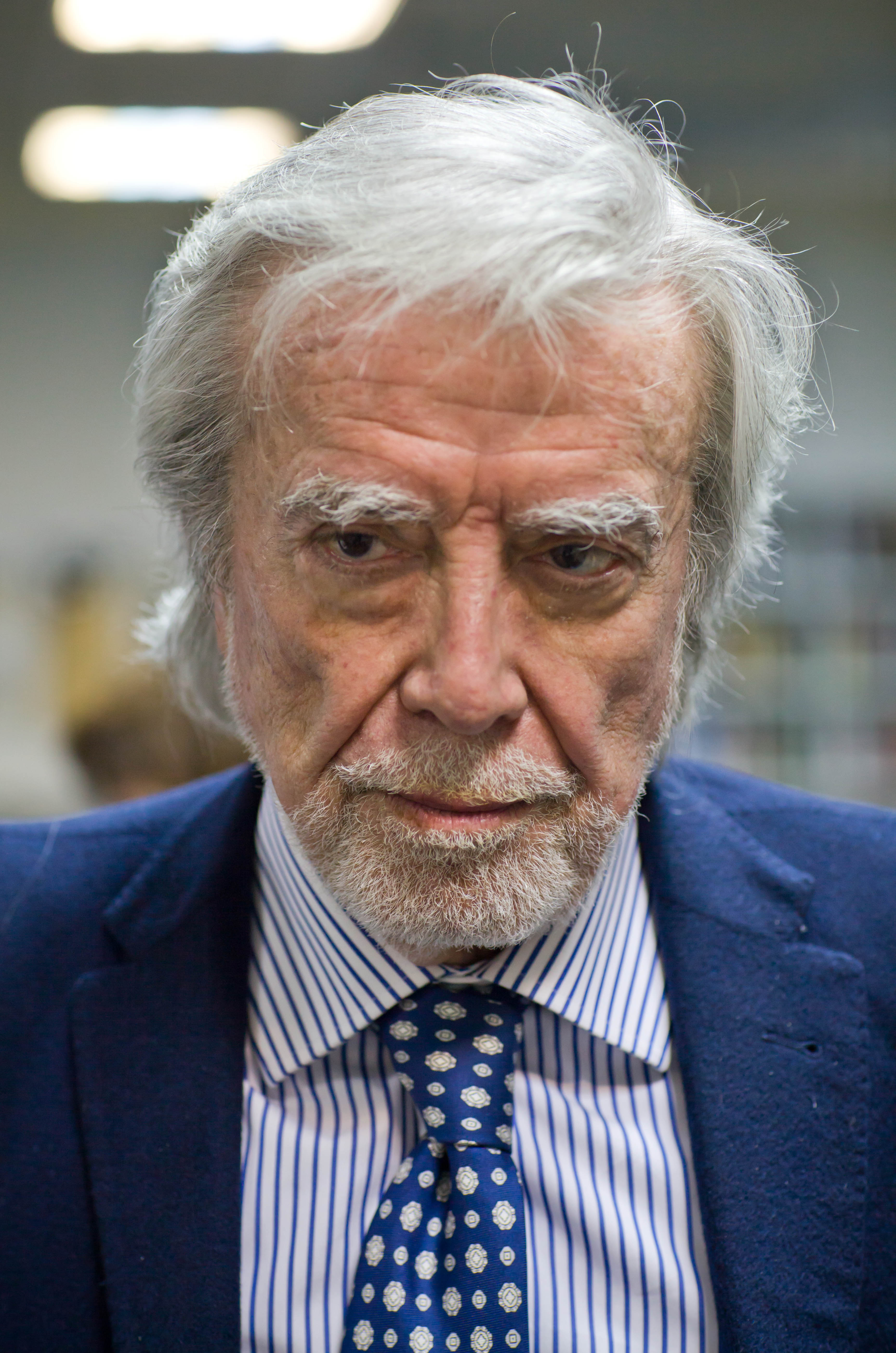
Giuseppe Di Giacomo, 2019

Author of about a hundred scientific publications on the relationship between aesthetics and literature, as well as on the relationship between aesthetics and the visual arts, with an emphasis on modern and contemporary culture, and on topics such as the image, representation, the art/life nexus, memory and the notion of testimony.

== Biography ==
Before undertaking his university career, immediately after graduating in Philosophy (with professor Emilio Garroni), Di Giacomo taught in senior high schools and, even before that, while still a university student, he was a substitute teacher for several months in various junior high schools. In 1976, he was awarded a contract to teach Epistemology at the Faculty of Natural, mathematical and physical sciences of the University of Parma, and obtained a permanent position in the same university two years later. On 28 February 1987 he became a researcher at Sapienza University of Rome, where, starting from 19 October 1993, he became Associate Professor and, from 1 November 2001, Full Professor of Aesthetics. Since November 2012, he has been the Director of MLAC (Museo Laboratorio di Arte Contemporanea/Laboratory Museum of Contemporary Art), Sapienza University. He is a member of the Teaching Staff of the Ph.D. in Philosophy of the same university, where he also served, for six years, as President of the master's degree of the former Faculty of Philosophy. He has coordinated national research projects (Progetti PRIN) and has taken part in international research projects. Over the last decade, he has coordinated university researches (Ricerche di Ateneo) involving more than thirty scholars from different study areas and focussing on aesthetic-philosophical and literary-artistic topics.

He edited, with Claudio Zambianchi, the anthology Alle origini dell'opera d'arte contemporanea (Roma-Bari, Laterza, 2008; 4th ed. 2012)

He is a founding member of SIE (Società Italiana di Estetica/Italian Society of Aesthetics).

He is the editor of the book series Figure dell'estetica of the publishing house Alboversorio (Milan).

He is a member of the scientific board of the following journals

- Paradigmi
- Studi di estetica
- Rivista di estetica
- Estetica. Studi e ricerche
- Comprendre. Revista catalana de filosofia

Di Giacomo is also a member of the scientific board of Aesthetica Preprint, a book series of the Centro Internazionale Studi di Estetica (International Centre for the Study of Aesthetics).

== Thought ==
Di Giacomo maintains that, in order to tackle the issue of the image today, it is necessary to refuse both an interpretation of the image as a mere mirror of things and its interpretation as an exclusively self-referential system of signs. Based on his reading of Wittgenstein, he draws the conclusion that logical representation entails something that manifests itself and, while doing so, remains ‘other’, distinct from the visibility of the representation itself. Thus, in presenting itself, the image manifests the other of the visible, of the representable: that other which reveals itself in the visible, by hiding from it. And this is precisely how the image becomes an icon of the invisible.

However, starting from Adorno's reflection, the image tends to lose its figurative character but, at the same time, it continues to exist; the image is, indeed, both a thing and a non-thing: a paradoxical “real unreality”. This ensues from the attempt to divide the double-edged nature of the image into its constituent elements: on the one hand, a readymade in which the representational dimension melts into a purely presentational dimension, and, on the other hand, a solely mental image endowed with a weak material support.

Today, the images of the new media are images of images and, in this sense, they are not even proper images but simulations, “simulacra”. It is no coincidence that digital images, as reproductions, have a low value as images, because they tend to acquire the aspect of something, thus losing that connection between transparency and opacity which characterises authentic images. Hence, indeed, the question whether new media are able to create real images. More particularly, it is in the kind of art that Adorno defines as “modern” that we find an overcoming of the epiphanic dimension that distinguishes the icon, where the visible is the place of manifestation of the invisible as Absolute. As we have become aware of the impossibility to exhaust the whole of reality and, at the same time, to manifest the Absolute, what emerges now is a conception of the image as something that can be interrogated as a testimony of what does not allow itself to be translated into an image: to testify is indeed to tell what cannot be told completely. In this sense, testimony coincides not with memory, as consistent with what happened, but with the immemorial, which refers to something we can neither remember nor forget completely, that is something that is neither totally speakable nor totally unspeakable.

In short, a witness only speaks starting from the impossibility to speak. That the image is equivalent to testimony means, then, that the attempt to say the unsayable is an infinite task, and this is why the question of the image forms an integral part of the ethical question. This entails that in the image there is no completeness and, consequently, neither redemption nor reconciliation with the real. From this point of view, to consider the image as testimony is tantamount to seeing it as the place of a perpetually unresolved tension between memory and oblivion, thus as the expression of the imperative of sense in a context, such as the contemporary one, in which both world and art seem to be increasingly abandoned to non-sense.

== Books ==
- Dalla logica all'estetica. Un saggio intorno a Wittgenstein, Parma, Pratiche, 1989
- Icona e arte astratta. La questione dell'immagine tra presentazione e rappresentazione, Palermo, Centro internazionale studi di estetica, 1999
- Estetica e letteratura. Il grande romanzo tra Ottocento e Novecento, Roma-Bari, Laterza, 1999 (4ª ed. 2010; trad. in lingua spagnola a cura di D. Malquori, Estética y literatura, Universidad de Valencia, Servicio de Publicaciones, 2014)
- Introduzione a Paul Klee, Roma-Bari, Laterza, 2003
- Narrazione e testimonianza. Quattro scrittori italiani del Novecento, Milano, Mimesis, 2012
- "Malevic. Pittura e filosofia dall'Astrattismo al Minimalismo", Carocci, Roma, 2014
- Fuori dagli schemi. Estetica e arti figurative dal Novecento a oggi, Laterza, Roma-Bari, 2015
- "Arte e modernità. Una guida filosofica", Carocci, Roma, 2016
- "Una pittura filosofica. Antoni Tàpies e l'informale", Mimesis, Milano, 2016
- "F. Nietzsche. L'eterno ritorno", commentario a cura di Giuseppe Di Giacomo, Alboversorio, Milano, 2016

== Papers ==
- Form, appearance, testimony: reflections on Adorno's Aesthetics, in G. Matteucci, S. Marino (a cura di), Theodor W. Adorno: Truth and Dialectical Experience / Verità ed esperienza dialettica, “Discipline filosofiche”, XXVI, 2, Quodlibet, Macerata, 2016, pp. 79–97
- Antoni Tàpies e Bill Viola: un'arte che sopravvive alla mercificazione, in G. Di Giacomo, L. Marchet-ti (a cura di), Contemporaneo. Arti visive, musica, architettura, “Rivista di Estetica”, 61, 2016, pp. 49–64
- Composizione, costruzione, icona nella concezione artistica di Pavel Florenskij, in D. Guastini, A. Ardovino (a cura di), I percorsi dell'immaginazione. Studi in onore di Pietro Montani, Pellegrini Editore, Cosenza, 2016 pp. 325–334
- Nietzsche e l’eterno ritorno, Commentario a F. Nietzsche, L’eterno ritorno, Alboversorio, Milano
- Prefazione a A. Lanzetta, Opaco mediterraneo. Modernità informale, Libria, Foggia, 2016, pp. 7–9
- Reflexions filosòfiques sobre la festa. Entre temporalitat i eternitat, in “La festa”, Col-loquis de Vic, Societat Catalana de Filosofia, XX, Vic, 2016, pp. 51–66
- The Myth. Aesthetic surgery clearly demonstrates what Greek myth has already taught us: beauty stems from horror, in P. Gandola, P. Persichetti (a cura di), Art of Blade. A book about surgery and huma-nity, T.A.M. Books, 2015, pp. 17–29
- La guerra i l'art, in La guerra, Col-loquis de Vic, Societat Catalana de Filosofia, XIX, 2015, pp. 11–26
- Arte e vita nella Recherche di Marcel Proust, in G. Di Giacomo (a cura di), Tra arte e vita. Percorsi fra testi, immagini, suoni, Mimesis, Milano, 2015, pp. 111–138.
- Lettura dell’Amleto, in G. Di Giacomo, L. Talarico (a cura di), Filosofia e teatro. Amleto e Macbeth, «Paradigmi», 1, 2015, pp. 21–36.
- Lettura del Macbeth, in G. Di Giacomo, L. Talarico (a cura di), Filosofia e teatro. Amleto e Macbeth, «Paradigmi», 1, 2015, pp. 111–125.
- Arte, linguaggio e rappresentazione nella riflessione filosofica di Wittgenstein in Comprendre. Re-vista Catalana de Filosofia, 16,2, 2014, pp. 29–50.
- Icona e immagine, in G. Bordi, J. Carlettini, M.L. Fobelli, M.R. Menna, P. Pogliani (a cura di), L'officina dello sguardo. Scritti in onore di Maria Andaloro, Gangemi, Roma, 2014, pp. 33–37.
- El poder i les seves representacions, in L'estat, Col•loquis de Vic., vol. XVIII, 2014, pp. 27–49.
- Dalla modernità alla contemporaneità: l’opera al di là dell’oggetto, in G. Di Giacomo, L. Marchetti (a cura di), Tra il sensibile e le arti. Trent’anni di estetica, «Studi di Estetica», 1-2/2014, pp. 57–84.
- Entre la paraula i el silenci: la filosofia com a recerca de la veritat, prefaci an Antoni Bosch-Veciana, "Imatge-Mirada-Paraula", Barcelona, Facultat de Filosofia, URL, 2013
- L’immagine artistica tra realtà e possibilità, tra “visibile” e “visivo”, in P. D’Angelo, E. Franzini, G. Lombardo, S. Tedesco (a cura di), Costellazioni estetiche. Dalla storia alla neoestetica. Studi in onore di Luigi Russo, Guerini e Associati, Milano, 2013, pp. 121–134.
- La questione dell'aura tra Benjamin e Adorno, in «Rivista di Estetica», 52 (2013), pp. 235–256
- Antonio Pizzuto: tra letteratura e filosofia, in "La vera novità ha nome Pizzuto", a cura di Domenica Perrone (a cura di), Bonanno Editore, Catania, 2012, pp. 37–48
- Bellezza e chirurgia estetica, in «Studi di Estetica», 46 (2012), pp. 65–94
- Il paradosso dell'apparenza nel teatro di Jean Genet, in «Comprendre. Revista Catalana de Filoso-fia», 2 (2012) 14, pp. 41–57
- La qüestió de la imatge a partir del debat sobre la icona, in «Col•loquis de Vic», 16 (2012), pp. 71– 89
- 2012 L'opera di Kafka come narrazione infinita, in Antonio Valentini, "Il silenzio delle Sirene. Mito e letteratura in Kafka", Mimesis, Milano, 2012, pp. IX-XXIV
- Lo statuto paradossale del museo tra globalizzazione e apertura all'alterità, in «Studi di Estetica», 45 (2012), "Il Museo oggi", a cura di G. Di Giacomo e A. Valentini, pp. 7–26
- Memoria e testimonianza tra estetica ed etica, in Volti della memoria, a cura di G. Di Giacomo (a cura di), Mimesis, Milano, 2012, pp. 445–481
- Arte e mondo. A proposito di alcune riflessioni di Georges Didi-Huberman su Bertolt Brecht, in D. Guastini, A. Campo, D. Cecchi (a cura di), Alla fine delle cose. Contributi a una storia critica delle immagini, La Casa Usher, Firenze, 2011, pp. 200–204.
- Intervista sulla bellezza, in Scuderi N. (a cura di), A me la mela. Dialoghi su bellezza, chirurgia plastica e medicina estetica, Franco Angeli, Milano, 2011, pp. 128–136
- La produzione artistica contemporanea attraverso la riflessione di Benjamin e Adorno, in “Studi di Estetica”, n. 43, 2011, pp. 5–20
- La relaciò entre imatge i temporalitat en la reflexiò de Warburg, Benjamin i Adorno, in I. Ro-virò Alemany (a cura di), Estètica catalana, estètica europea. Estudis d’estètica: entre la tradiciò i l’actualitat, Barcelona, 2011, pp. 9–27
- La idea d'Europa entre la cosciència de l'ocàs i l'obertura a l'altre, in Europa, in J. Monserrat, I. Roviró, B. Torres (a cura di), Societat Catalana de Filosofia, Barcelona, 2011, pp. 71–78 [Atti del convegno, Col•loquis de Vic, XV, Vic, 2010]
- Arte e realtà nella produzione artistica del Novecento, in G. Di Giacomo, L. Marchetti (a cura di), L’oggetto nella pratica artistica, «Paradigmi», 2 (2010), Franco Angelini, Milano, 2010, pp. 87–104
- Il percorso di Gualtiero Savelli: dall'astrattismo di Malevič e Mondrian all'astrazione geometrica, in G. Di Giacomo (a cura di), Astrazione e astrazioni. In occasione di una mostra di Gualtiero Savelli, AlboVersorio, Milano, 2010, pp. 11–19
- La bellezza. Promessa di Immortalità?, in “Medic. Metodologia Didattica e Innovazione Clinica”, vol. 18, 1-3, dicembre 2010, pp. 48–51
- Ripensare l'aura nella modernità, in L. Russo (a cura di), Dopo l'Estetica, Aesthetica Supplementa, Palermo, 2010, pp. 75–89
- Modernità e arte, in J. Monserrat Molas, I. Roviró Alemany (a cura di), La Modernitat, Societat Catalana de Filosofia, Barcellona, 2009, pp. 113–134 [Atti del convegno, Col•loquis de Vic, XIII, Vic, 2008]
- Il male oggi. Produzioni artistiche e riflessioni estetiche, in P. D'Oriano, D. Rocchi (a cura di), Il male e l'essere, Mimesis, Milano, 2009, pp. 247–261
- Arte e moda nella riflessione estetica di Adorno, in P. Romani, Percorsi teoretici. Scritti in onore e in memoria di P.M. Toesca, Diabasis, Reggio Emilia, 2009, pp. 213–225
- Forma e riflessione nel romanzo moderno, in M. Fusillo (a cura di), Philosophie du roman, Revue Internationale de Philosophie, 63, Meyer, Bruxelles, 2009, pp. 137–151
- Il silenzio, il vuoto e la fine della rappresentazione, in G. Di Giacomo, R. Colombo (a cura di), Beckett ultimo atto, Albo Versorio, Milano, 2009, pp. 13–26
- Immagine, icona, opera d'arte, in F. Desideri, G. Matteucci, J.M. Schaeffer (a cura di), Il fatto estetico. Tra emozione e cognizione, ETS, Pisa, 2009, pp. 163–179
- La questione del rapporto arte-forma nella riflessione di Prinzhorn sulle "Produzioni plasti-che" dei malati mentali, Prefazione a F. Bassan, Al di là della psichiatria e dell'estetica. Stu-dio su Hans Prinzhorn, Lithos, Roma, 2009, pp. XI-XVIII
- La questione dell'immagine nella riflessione estetica del Novecento, in G. Di Giacomo (a cura di), Ripensare le immagini, Mimesis, Milano, 2009, pp. 367–390
- Le Mal aujourd'hui. Productions artistiques et rèflexions esthètiques, in «La règle du jeu», 39 (2009), pp. 153–171
- Adorno: arte ed estetica dopo Auschwitz, in M. Failla (a cura di), Dialettica negativa: categorie e contesti, Manifesto libri, Roma, 2008, pp. 195–207
- C'è ancora spazio per l'aura nella scultura contemporanea? A proposito di Luigi Mainolfi, in P. De Luca (a cura di), Intorno all'immagine, Mimesis, Milano, 2008, pp. 135–149
- Postfazione, in G. Di Giacomo, C. Zambianchi (a cura di), Alle origini dell'opera d'arte con-temporanea, Laterza, Roma-Bari, 2008, pp. 203–222
- Armando Ferrari ed Emilio Garroni: un incontro, in F. Romano, M. Romanini, S. Tauriello (a cura di), La metafora nella relazione analitica, Mimesis, Milano, 2007, pp. 21–41
- Dal cosmo al caos: la pittura di Paola Romano, in Paola Romano, Catalogo della Mostra, Print Company, Roma, 2007, pp. 5–7
- Ironia e romanzo, in P. F. Pieri (a cura di), Perché si ride. Umorismo, comicità, ironia, Moretti & Vitali, Bergamo, 2007, pp. 133–152
- La connessione arte-moda nella riflessione estetica del Novecento, in «Almanacco Odradek», 2 (2007), pp. 174–177
- Arte, storia dell'arte e beni culturali, in D. Goldoni, M. Rispoli, R. Troncon (a cura di), Estetica e management nei beni e nelle produzioni culturali, Il Brennero - Der Brenner, Bolzano - Trento - Vienna, 2006, pp. 53–60
- Da Nietzsche a Benjamin: riflessioni sulla metropoli e dialettica del risveglio, in R. Colombo (a cura di), «Fictions. Studi sulla narratività», 5 (2006), pp. 31–39
- Il "Tintoretto" di Sartre, tra presentazione e rappresentazione, in G. Farina (a cura di),«Bollettino Studi sartriani. Gruppo ricerca Sartre», 2 (2006), pp. 213–224
- Pietro M. Toesca: il rovesciamento della prospettiva, ovvero il doppio sguardo, in «Eupo-lis», 42 (2006), pp. 40–52
- Sul corpo. Riflessioni filosofiche e psicoanalitiche, in «Eupolis», 41 (2006), pp. 9–20
- Vedere e vedere-come: le "Osservazioni sulla filosofia della psicologia" di Ludwig Wittgenstein, in S. Borutti, L. Perissinotto (a cura di), Il terreno del linguaggio. Testimonianze e saggi sulla filosofia di Wittgenstein, Carocci, Roma, 2006, pp. 125–134
- La poesia dopo Auschwitz, in «Eupolis», 38 (2005), pp. 36–46
- Sul rapporto arte-vita a partire dalla "Teoria estetica" di Adorno, in «Idee», 58 (2005), pp. 93–112
- Visione, forma e contenuto in Arnheim e Wittgenstein, in L. Pizzo Russo (a cura di), Rudolf Arnheim. Arte e percezione visiva, Aesthetica Supplementa, Palermo, 2005, pp. 195–212
- Arte e rappresentazione nella "Teoria estetica" di Adorno, in «Cultura tedesca», 26 (2004), pp. 103–121
- Le idee estetiche di Stendhal, in M. Colesanti, H. de Jacquelot, L. Norci Cagiano, A. M. Scaiola (a cura di), Arrigo Beyle "Romano" (1831-1841), Edizioni di Storia e Letteratura, Roma, 2004, pp. 113–135
- Rappresentazione e memoria in Aby Warburg, in C. Cieri Via, P. Montani (a cura di), Lo sguardo di Giano. Aby Warburg fra tempo e memoria, Nino Aragno Editore, Torino, 2004, pp. 79–112
- Il problema della rappresentazione in Gombrich e Goodman, in «Studi di estetica», 27 (2003), pp. 79–112
- Il tema della bellezza nel romanzo moderno, in F. Sisinni (a cura di), Riflessioni sulla bellezza, De Luca, Roma, 2003, pp. 99–117
- Le nozioni di famiglia, classe, individuo nella riflessione estetica di Morpurgo-Tagliabue, in L. Russo (a cura di), Guido Morpurgo-Tagliabue e l'estetica del Settecento, Aesthetica Preprint, Palermo, 2003, pp. 75–84
- Sguardo, simbolo, mito. Viaggio in un museo immaginario, in G. Baruchello, Cosa guardano le statue, Danilo Montinari Editore, Ravenna, 2003, pp. 5–22
- Comprensione e rappresentazione in Wittgenstein, in «Il cannocchiale», 3 (2001), pp. 197–224
- Sulla rappresentazione, in U. Cao, S. Catucci (a cura di), Spazi e maschere dell'architettura e della metropoli, Meltemi, Roma, 2001, pp. 139–147
- Eros come narrazione nella "Ricerca del tempo perduto" di Marcel Proust, in «Almanacchi nuovi», 2 (1998), pp. 55–76
- Il Secondo Concilio di Nicea e il problema dell'immagine, in L. Russo (a cura di), Nicea e la civiltà dell'immagine, Aesthetica Preprint, Palermo, 1998, pp. 71–86
- Jean Genet e il paradosso dell'immagine, in P. Montani (a cura di), Senso e storia dell'estetica. Studi offerti an Emilio Garroni in occasione del suo settantesimo compleanno, Pratiche, Parma, 1995, pp. 831–853
- Etica ed estetica nella filosofia del giovane Lukács, Introduzione a G. Lukács, Teoria del romanzo, Pratiche, Parma, 1994, pp. 7–41
- Realtà e Finzione in "Dissonanzen-Quartett" di Emilio Garroni, in «La ragione possibile», 5 (1992), pp. 264–268
- Il comportamento cognitivo dell'uomo nell'epistemologia evoluzionistica di Popper, in «Terzo Mondo», 27 (1986), pp. 48–71
- L'epistemologia di Mach fra positivismo e costruttivismo, in «Lineamenti», 6 (1984), pp. 57–76
- Senso e significato nella filosofia del linguaggio di Wittgenstein, in A. Gargani (a cura di), Il Circolo di Vienna, Longo, Ravenna, 1984, pp. 131–156
- La nozione di «uso» e la funzione della filosofia in Wittgenstein, in A. Gargani (a cura di), L. Wittgenstein e la cultura contemporanea, Longo, Ravenna, 1983, pp. 117–127
- Implicazioni e aspetti epistemologici della sociobiologia, in M. Ingrosso, S. Manghi, V. Parisi (a cura di), Sociologia possible, Franco Angeli, Milano, 1982, pp. 69–82
- Natura e cultura: il rapporto tra "strutture" genetiche e "processi" di apprendimento nel comportamento animale e umano, in AA. VV. (a cura di), L'osservazione del comportamento sociale, Regione Piemonte, Torino, 1982, pp. 37–54

== Papers on line ==
- Art and Perspicuous Vision in Wittgenstein's Philosophical Reflection, in «Aisthesis - Rivista di estetica online»,2013, ISSN 2035-8466, https://web.archive.org/web/20150118192844/http://www.fupress.net/index.php/aisthesis/article/view/12844/12163
- L'immagine-tempo da Warburg a Benjamin e Adorno, in «Aisthesis - Rivista di estetica online», 2010, ISSN 2035-8466, http://www.aisthesisonline.it/wp-content/uploads/2011/01/06di-giacomo-def.pdf

== Curatorship ==
- G. Di Giacomo, L. Marchetti (a cura di), Contemporaneo. Arti visive, musica, architettura, «Rivista di Estetica», 2016
- G. Di Giacomo (a cura di), Tra arte e vita. Percorsi fra testi, immagini, suoni, Mimesis, Milano, 2015
- G. Di Giacomo, L. Talarico (a cura di), Filosofia e teatro. Amleto e Macbeth, «Paradigmi», 1, 2015
- G. Di Giacomo, L. Marchetti (a cura di), Tra il sensibile e le arti. Trent’anni di estetica, «Studi di Estetica», 1-2/2014
- G. Di Giacomo, L. Marchetti (a cura di), Aura, «Rivista di Estetica», 52 (2013)
- G. Di Giacomo, A. Valentini (a cura di), Il museo oggi, «Studi di Estetica», 45 (2012)
- G. Di Giacomo (a cura di), Volti della memoria, Mimesis, Milano, 2012
- G. Di Giacomo (a cura di), Astrazione e astrazioni. In occasione di una mostra di Gualtiero Savelli, Alboversorio, Milano, 2010
- G. Di Giacomo, L. Marchetti (a cura di), L'oggetto nella pratica artistica, "Paradigmi", 2 (2010), Franco Angeli, Milano, 2010
- G. Di Giacomo (a cura di), Ripensare le immagini, Mimesis, Milano, 2009
- G. Di Giacomo, R. Colombo (a cura di), Beckett ultimo atto, Albo Versorio, Milano, 2009
- G. Di Giacomo, C. Zambianchi (a cura di), Alle origini dell'opera d'arte contemporanea, Laterza, Roma-Bari, 2008
