= Necropolis of Cassibile =

Burial site near Syracuse, Sicily, Italy

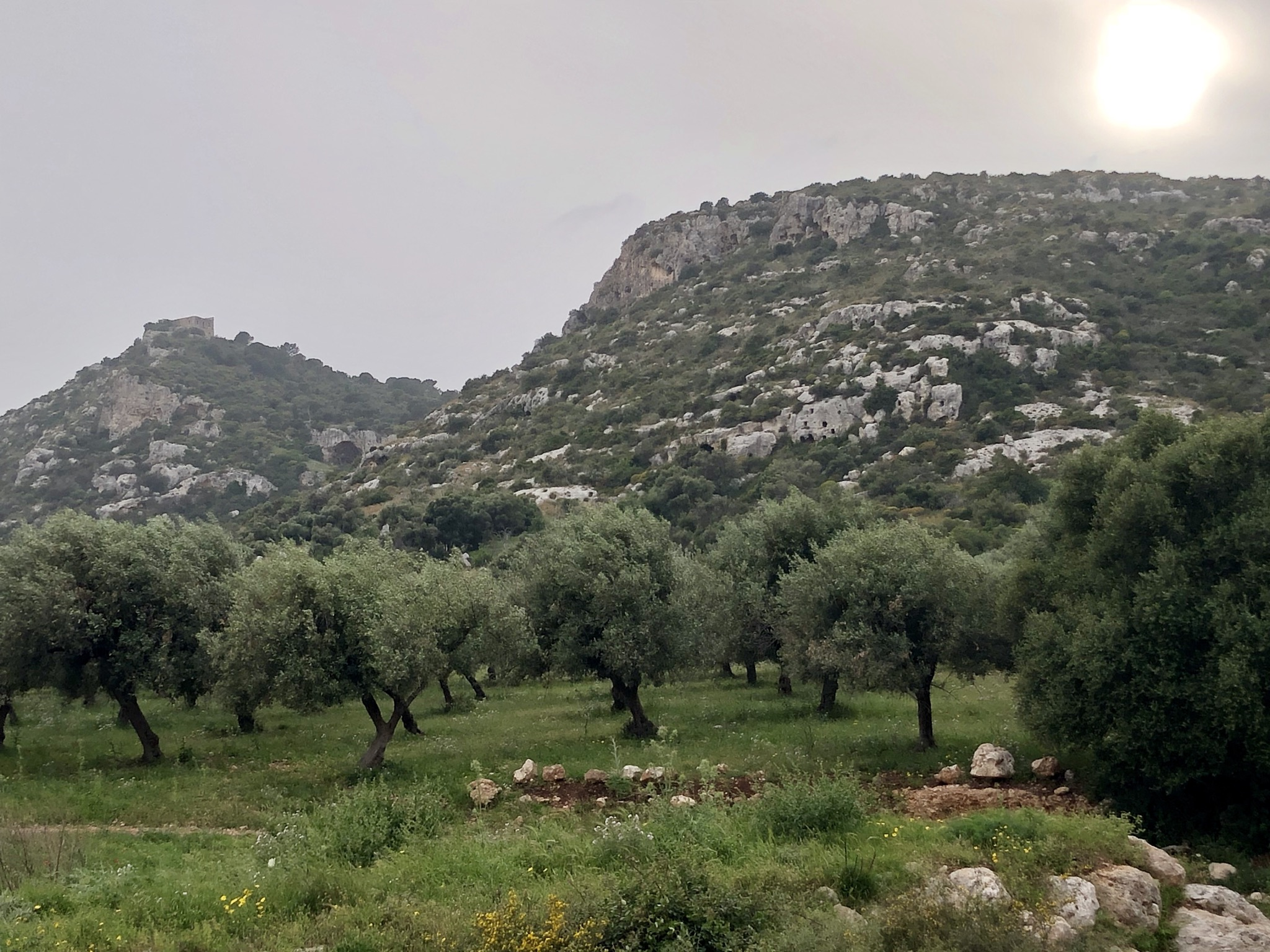
- The necropolis seen from afar
- Interactive map of Necropolis of Cassibile
- Cultures: Sican, Sicels, Byzantine
- Location: Avola, Noto
- Region: Syracuse

The Necropolis of Cassibile is a large archaeological site in the Province of Syracuse, Sicily, located near the towns of Avola and Cassibile. The site contains a very large graves system situated inside several ravines; the largest of them is called "Cavagrande" (transl. "Large Ravine"). About 2,000 graves carved out of the rock have been found; they are dated from the 11th to the 9th century BC. This necropolis gives the name to a precise period of the Sicels' civilization.

== Description ==
Avola comprises the nucleus of a large archaeological site, which borders the nature reserve of Riserva naturale orientata Cavagrande del Cassibile. Cavagrande is the largest canyon in the area. There are other caves to the north, which terminate near the village of Cassibile. The most archaeologically interesting, the Cava Sant'Anna, contains the entire Necropolis of Cassibile, the second largest tomb complexes of the Sicul civilization after the Necropolis of Pantalica.

In the necropolis, there are around 2,000 tombs in artificial caves, which date to between 800 and 1000 BC. The site has divulged numerous archaeological finds, like human remains and pottery. Most of these finds are kept in the Museo archeologico regionale Paolo Orsi. Other more isolated tomb complexes were made later. In the additions, archaeologists have hypothesized that there was a large Sicul settlement (often identified with an ancient city called Hybla) formed after the overpopulation of Pantalica around 1100 BC. Of that settlement only a small Greek Doric temple remains.

The finds at the site reflected the civilization's refinement, likely due to their contact with the Phoenicians and proximity to the sea. The necropolis was reused in the Byzantine era, and many of the tombs were put to other uses, like arcosoliums. The pyramidal hill in front of the necropolis, called the "Cugno Mola", has been identified as a fortification, which Thucydides mentions in his account of the Peloponnesian War. He describes a military fort established at the mouth of the river Cassibile by the Syracusans to watch over the fleeing Athenians. The Syracusans prevented the Athenians from entering the valley, where they sought refuge from the Sicels, who were evidently allied with the Syracusans.

== Gallery ==
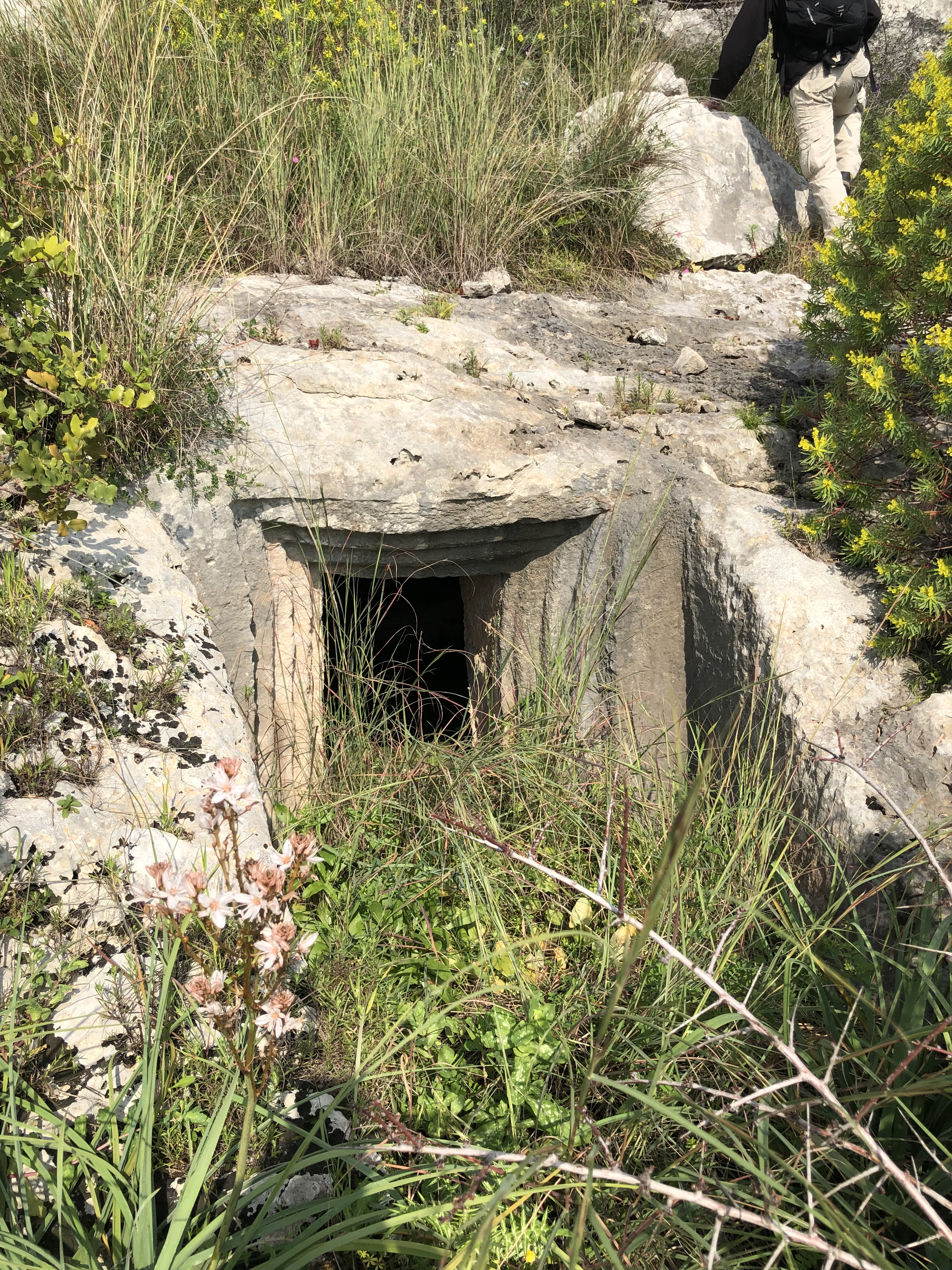

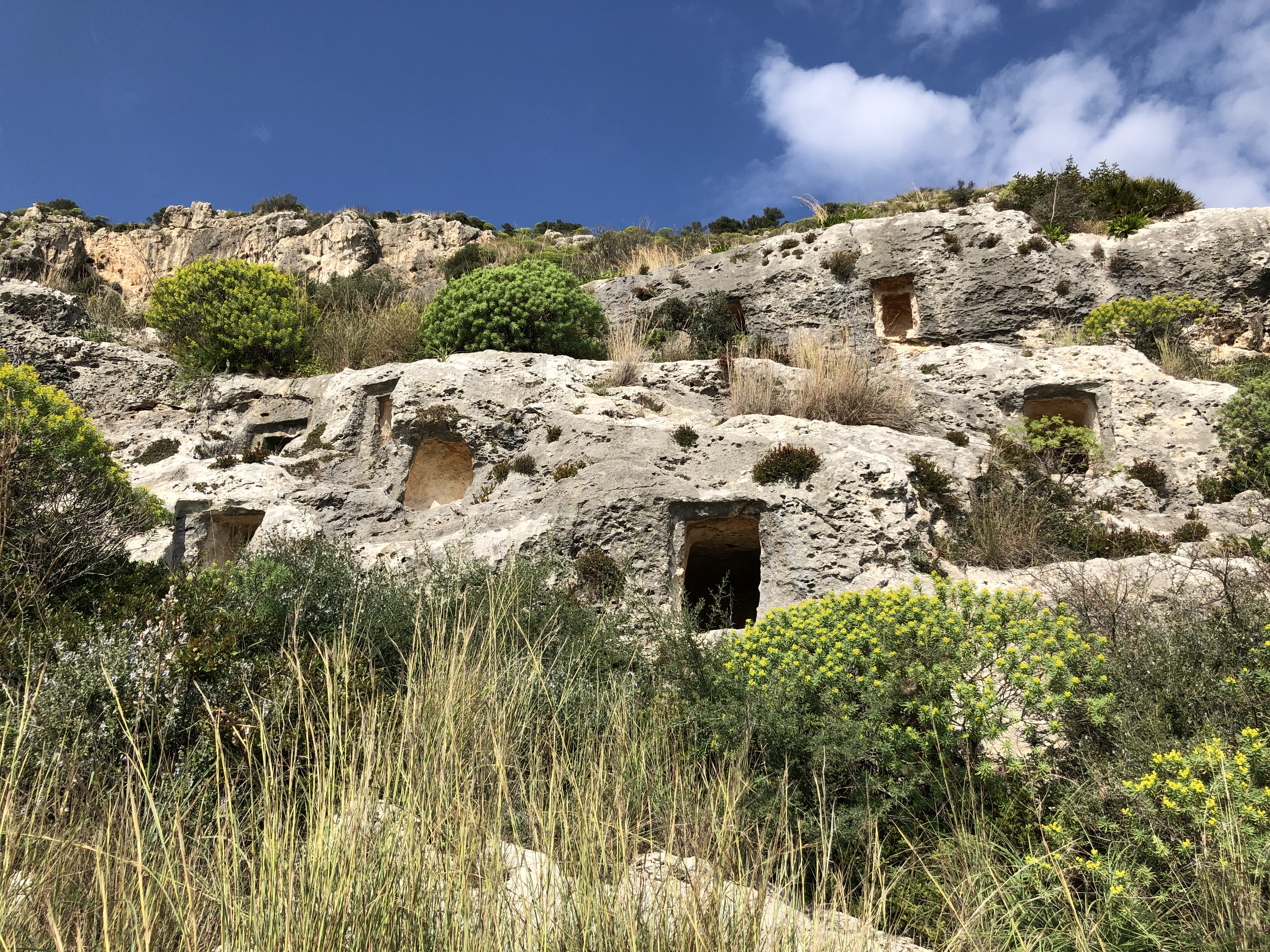

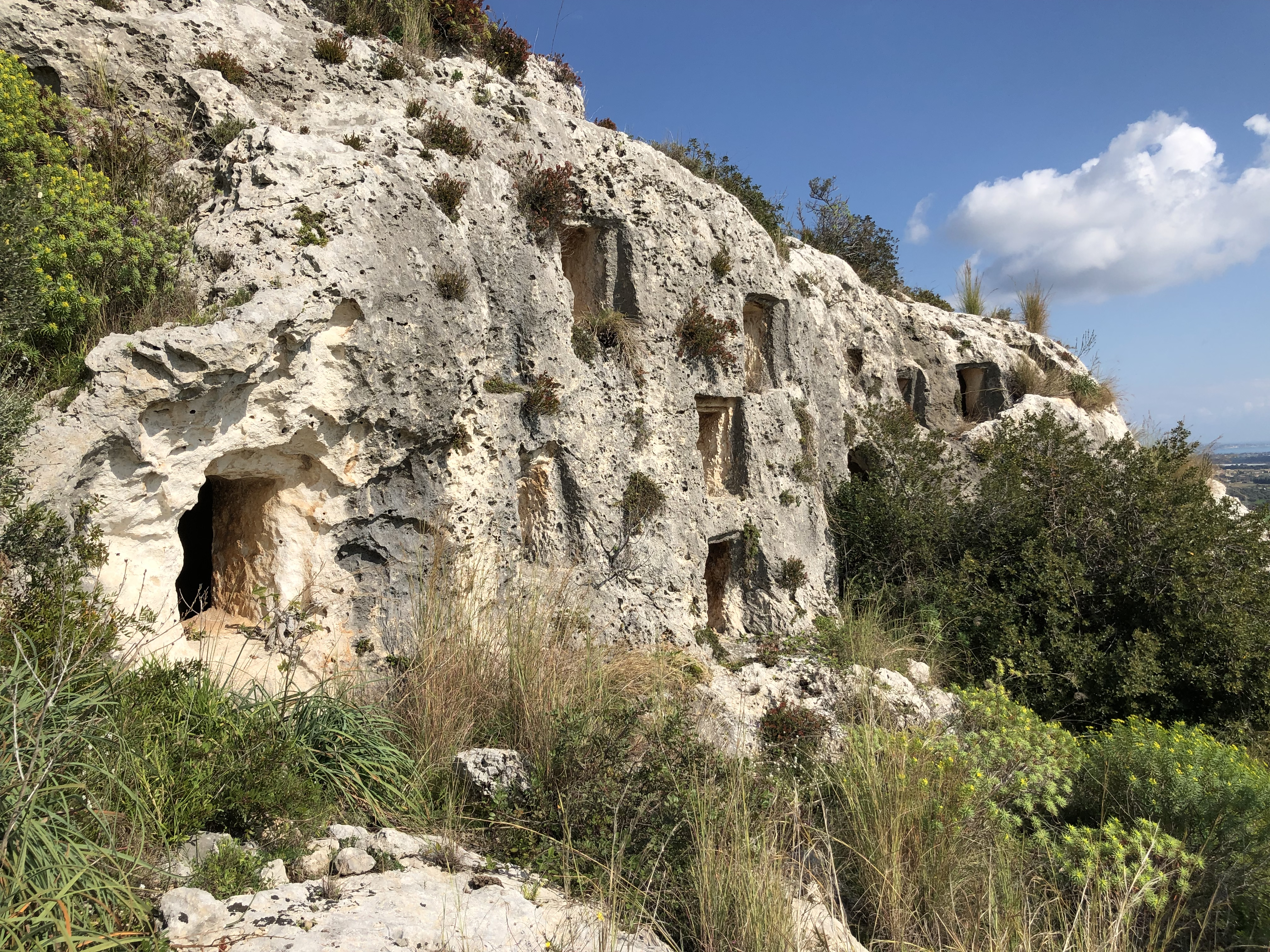

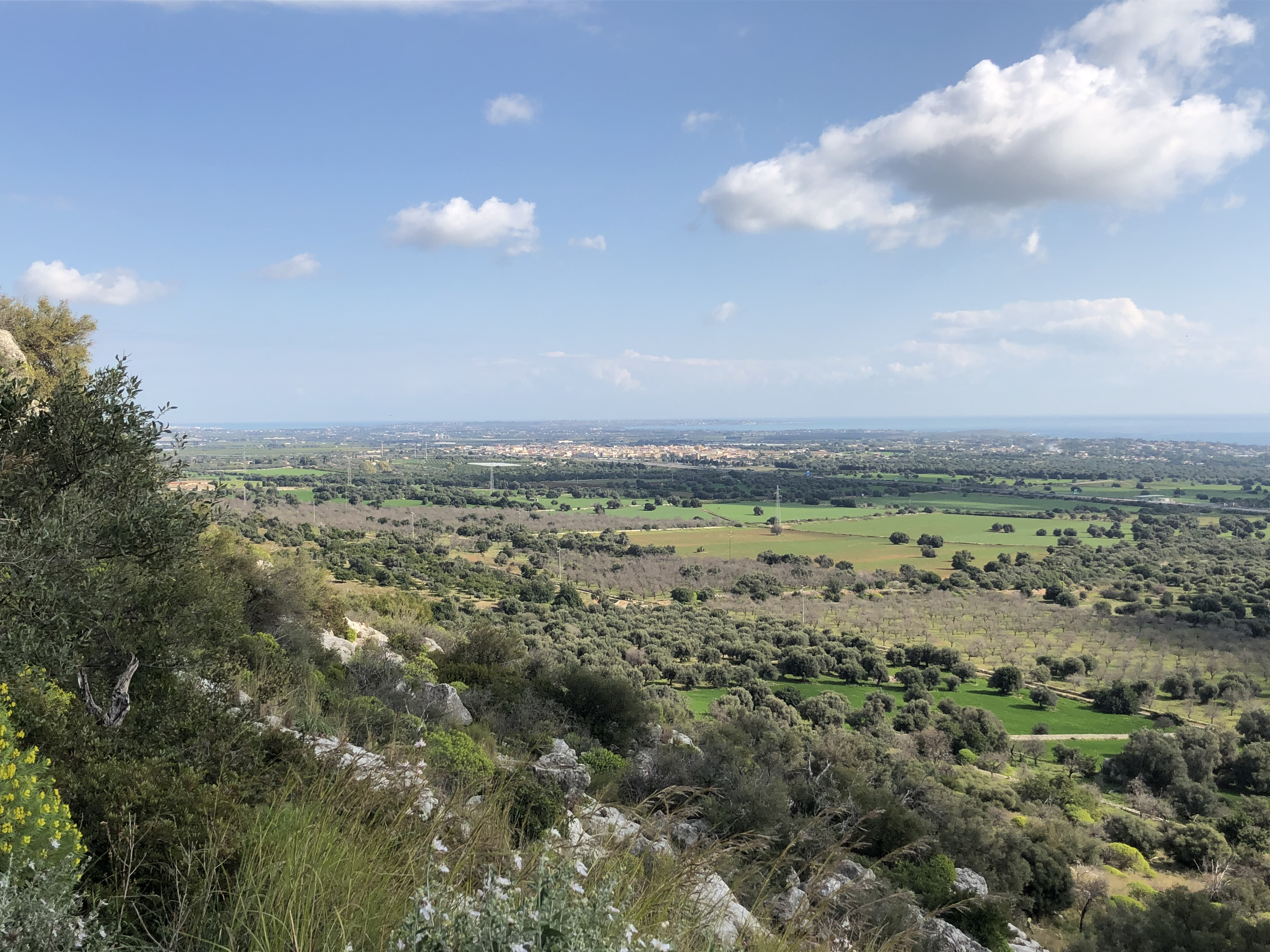
