= Cassibile (village) =

- Frazione
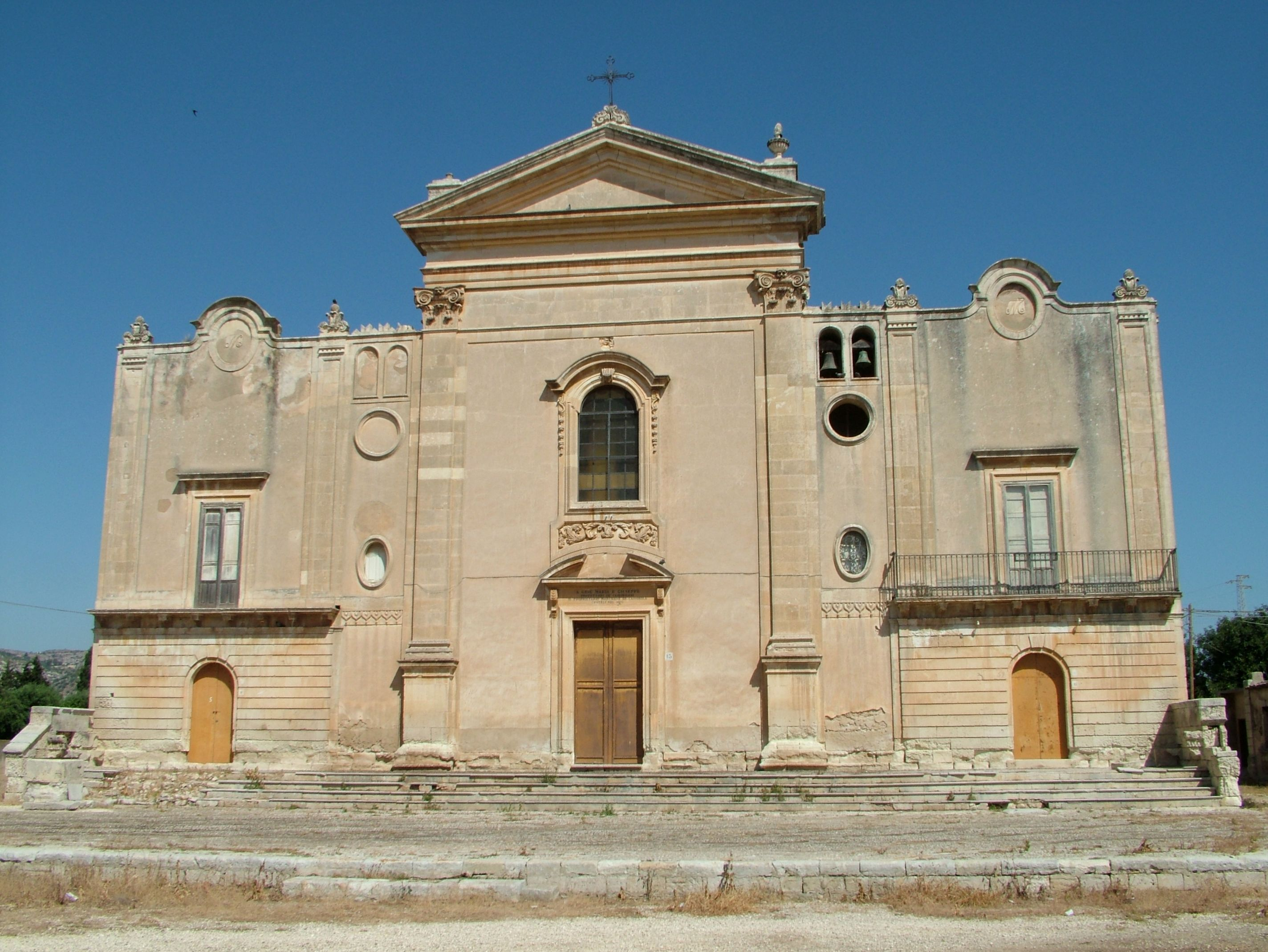
- Village church

- Location of Cassibile in Italy
- Coordinates: 36°58′35″N 15°11′51″E
- Country: Italy
- Region: Sicily
- Province: Syracuse
- Comune: Syracuse
- Elevation: 53 m (174 ft)

Population (2006)
  - Total: 5,800
- Demonym: Cassibilesi
- Time zone: UTC+1 (CET)
  - Summer (DST): UTC+2 (CEST)
- Postal code: 96010
- Dialing code: 0931

Cassibile (Sicilian: Cassìbbili) is an Italian village and civil parish (frazione) of the city and municipality (comune) of Syracuse (Siracusa), in Sicily. As of 2006 its population was of 5,800.

== History ==
The Necropolis of Cassibile, spread over the hills on either side of the Cassibile river, consists of hundreds of rock-cut chamber tombs dating to the Late Bronze and Iron Ages (about 1000–700 BC).

In 1797 the Bourbons conceded the territory, together with the title of Marquis, to Silvestro Loffredo. In 1850, he started the construction of the rural village, which was completed by his son Gaetano, who in 1870 built the church of the Holy Family.

During the Second World War, the village became famous as the location of the Armistice between Italy and Allies (also known as the Armistice of Cassibile), signed on September 3 and publicly declared on September 8, 1943.

== Geography ==
Cassibile is located 18 km (11 mi) south of Syracuse and close to the village of Fontane Bianche, by the Mediterranean Sea, built as the sea resort of Cassibile in the 1960s. It is 12 km (7.5 mi) from Avola and 21 km (13 mi) from Noto.

The Cassibile River flows a few kilometres west of the village and includes a nature reserve along its course.

== Transport ==
The A18, a partially built motorway that links Messina and Gela through Catania, Syracuse and Ragusa, serves the locality. Cassibile also contains a minor railway station on the Syracuse-Gela-Canicattì line (to Agrigento and Caltanissetta), a few kilometres away from the Syracuse main station.
