= Peter Young (historian) =

British Army officer

Brigadier Peter Young DSO MC**
- Born: 28 July 1915; Kensington, London, England
- Died: 13 September 1988 (aged 73); Tewkesbury, Gloucestershire, England
- Military career
- Allegiance: United Kingdom
- Branch: British Army
- Service years: 1937–1959
- Rank: Brigadier
- Service number: 77254
- Unit: Bedfordshire and Hertfordshire Regiment
- Commands: 3 Commando; 3 Commando Brigade; 9th Regiment, Arab Legion
- Conflicts: Second World War: Battle of France; Operation Ambassador; Operation Claymore; Operation Archery; Operation Jubilee; Operation Husky; Operation Devon; Operation Overlord
- Awards: Distinguished Service Order; Military Cross & Two Bars; Mentioned in Despatches; Order of Al Istiqlal (Jordan)
- Other work: Historian

Brigadier Peter Young, DSO, MC & Two Bars (28 July 1915 – 13 September 1988) was a British Army officer who, during the Second World War, served with distinction with the British Commandos.

Subsequently, he commanded a regiment of the Arab Legion, then returned to England in staff appointments. In 1959 he retired from the army as a brigadier and became head of Military History at the Royal Military Academy Sandhurst.

In 1968, following the publication of Young’s Edgehill 1642, he founded The Sealed Knot, a Civil War historical re-enactment society. He also went on to become a well-known military historian and author.

== Early life ==
Born in London to Dallas Hales Wilkie Young and his wife, Irene Barbara Lushington Mellor, Young attended Monmouth School and subsequently read for a degree in Modern History at Trinity College, Oxford.

Having joined the Territorial Army (TA) while at Oxford, Young was commissioned as a second lieutenant in 1938 but this was converted (and backdated to 1937) to a permanent commission in the Bedfordshire and Hertfordshire Regiment in January 1939.

== Second World War ==
Assigned to the 2nd Battalion, Bedfordshire and Hertfordshire Regiment, Young went to France with the battalion in late 1939, shortly after the outbreak of the Second World War, as part of the British Expeditionary Force (BEF). The battalion formed part of the 10th Infantry Brigade, commanded by Brigadier Evelyn Barker, part of the 4th Infantry Division. Following the Battle of France in May 1940, the battalion was evacuated from Dunkirk in late May, during which Young was wounded. After he recovered from his wounds Young volunteered to join the Commandos and on being accepted joined 3 Commando in time to take part in the second commando operation of the war–Operation Ambassador–in July 1940. Promoted to lieutenant in August 1940, Young was to serve in the commandos for the rest of the war. Following Operation Ambassador and the subsequent operations, Operation Claymore and Operation Archery, Young was awarded the Military Cross (MC).

Promoted to captain, Young spent some time on the staff of Combined Operations Headquarters before returning to 3 Commando as second in command with the temporary rank of major. In this role he took part in Operation Jubilee, the Dieppe Raid, in August 1942 for which he was awarded the Distinguished Service Order (DSO). Still with 3 Commando, Young participated in Operation Husky, the Allied invasion of Sicily, where 3 Commando were one of the first units to land. For his part in this operation Young was awarded his first bar to the MC. After Sicily, Young became Officer Commanding 3 Commando and led them during the Allied invasion of Italy. Young and 3 Commando were withdrawn to England in October 1943 but the intervening period was enough for Young to be awarded a second bar to his MC. In June 1944 Young took part in the Normandy landings, still with 3 Commando but following the Normandy campaign he was promoted to temporary lieutenant-colonel and posted to the Far East as second-in-command of the 3rd Commando Brigade, a post he held until the end of the war although he did for a while become the officer commanding the brigade.

== Post-war ==
Under the complicated British army system of substantive, acting, temporary, brevet and war substantive ranks, Young ended the Second World War as a substantive lieutenant but also with the war substantive rank of lieutenant-colonel and the acting rank of brigadier. It was not until August 1945 that he was promoted to the substantive rank of captain. After attending the Staff College at Camberley and a subsequent staff appointment at GHQ Middle East Land Forces, in 1953 Young returned to the Bedfordshire and Hertfordshire Regiment as a company commander with the substantive rank of major. Peacetime duties, however, were not to his liking so he was seconded to the Arab Legion as OC of its 9th Regiment, a post he held until 1956 and subsequently recognised by the award of the Jordanian Order of Al Istiqlal. Promoted to lieutenant-colonel in 1956 he returned to England in staff appointments before retiring from the army in 1959 with the honorary rank of brigadier.

== Later life ==
Upon leaving the army, Young became Head of Military History at the Royal Military Academy Sandhurst between 1959 and 1969 before he retired to concentrate on a writing career. His first two books, both autobiographies, Bedouin Command and Storm from the Sea had been published while he was still in the army but his lifelong interest in history and with the position at Sandhurst he began to write history books particularly on the English Civil Wars and the Napoleonic Wars. In 1968 he founded the Sealed Knot, a re-enactment society dedicated to the English Civil Wars. His writing career continued until his death and he also worked as a historical and military consultant on a number of TV series. He was elected as a Fellow of Society of Antiquaries of London, the Royal Historical Society and the Royal Geographical Society.

Young died at Twyning Manor, Twyning, near Tewkesbury, Gloucestershire, on 13 September 1988.

== Personal life ==
Young was married in 1950 to Joan Duckworth (1916–1991; the daughter of Ellis Heys Sanderson Duckworth). The marriage was childless.

== Selected publications ==
- Bedouin Command (memoirs, 1959), with foreword by John Bagot Glubb
- Storm from the Sea (memoirs, 1968)
- Edgehill 1642: the Campaign and the Battle (1968)
- Oliver Cromwell (Batsford, 1962) "Makers of Britain" series
- Marston Moor, 1644: The Campaign and the Battle (Roundwood Press, 1970) ISBN 9780900093074
- The English Civil War: A Military History of Three Civil Wars 1642-1651 (Eyre Methuen, 1974), co-authored with Richard Holmes
- Naseby 1645: the Campaign and the Battle (Cornerstone, 1985)
- Decisive Battles of the Second World War: an Anthology (ed.) (Arthur Barker, 1969)
- D-Day (Bison Books, 1981)

== Bibliography ==
- Durnford-Slater, John (2002) [1953]. Commando: Memoirs of a Fighting Commando in World War Two. London: Greenhill Books. ISBN 978-1-85367-479-2.
- Twiston Davies, David, ed. (2003). The Daily Telegraph Book of Military Obituaries. Bounty Books. ISBN 978-0-7537-1529-1.
- Michelli, Alison (2007). Commando to Captain-General: The Life of Brigadier Peter Young. Pen and Sword Books. ISBN 978-1844156511.
