= Santa Venera, Avola =

Church in Avola, Italy

Coordinates: 36.90800°N 15.13587°E

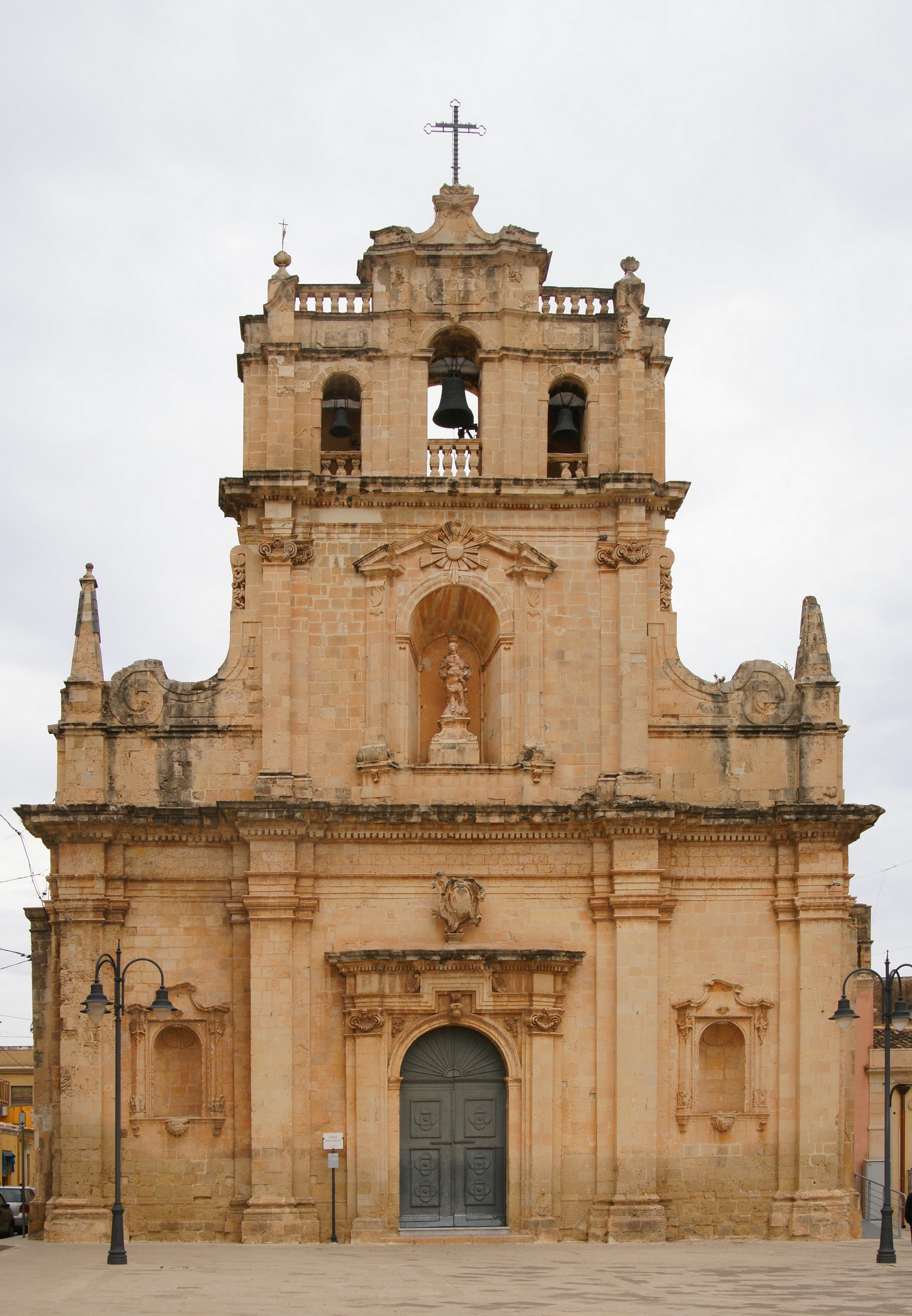
Facade of Santa Venera

Santa Venera is a Baroque style church located on Piazza Teatro in the town of Avola, province of Siracusa, region of Sicily, Italy.

== History and description ==
Construction of a church at the site took place from 1713-1715 using designs attributed to Michelangelo Alessi. The dome collapsed in the earthquake of 1848, and was not reconstructed until 1962 by the engineer Pietro Lojacono. The decorated three story facade, flanked by volutes and obelisks, houses a statue of Saint Venera, patron of Avola, above the central portal.

The interior has three naves. The main altar was completed in 1840 and has an oval canvas depicting Santa Venera preaching painted by Costantino Carasi. In a chapel at the end of the right aisle is a painted icon of the patron saint (1863) sculpted by Raffaele Abbate, and decorated with a silver and gold dress. The church also houses altarpieces depicting Saints Crispino and Crispiniano (patron saints of shoemakers), a Saint Marta, and a Holy Family with St Vincent Ferrer. The organ in the church dates to 1901.
