= San Giovanni Battista, Avola =

Church building in Avola, Italy

Coordinates: 37.0°N 14.9°E

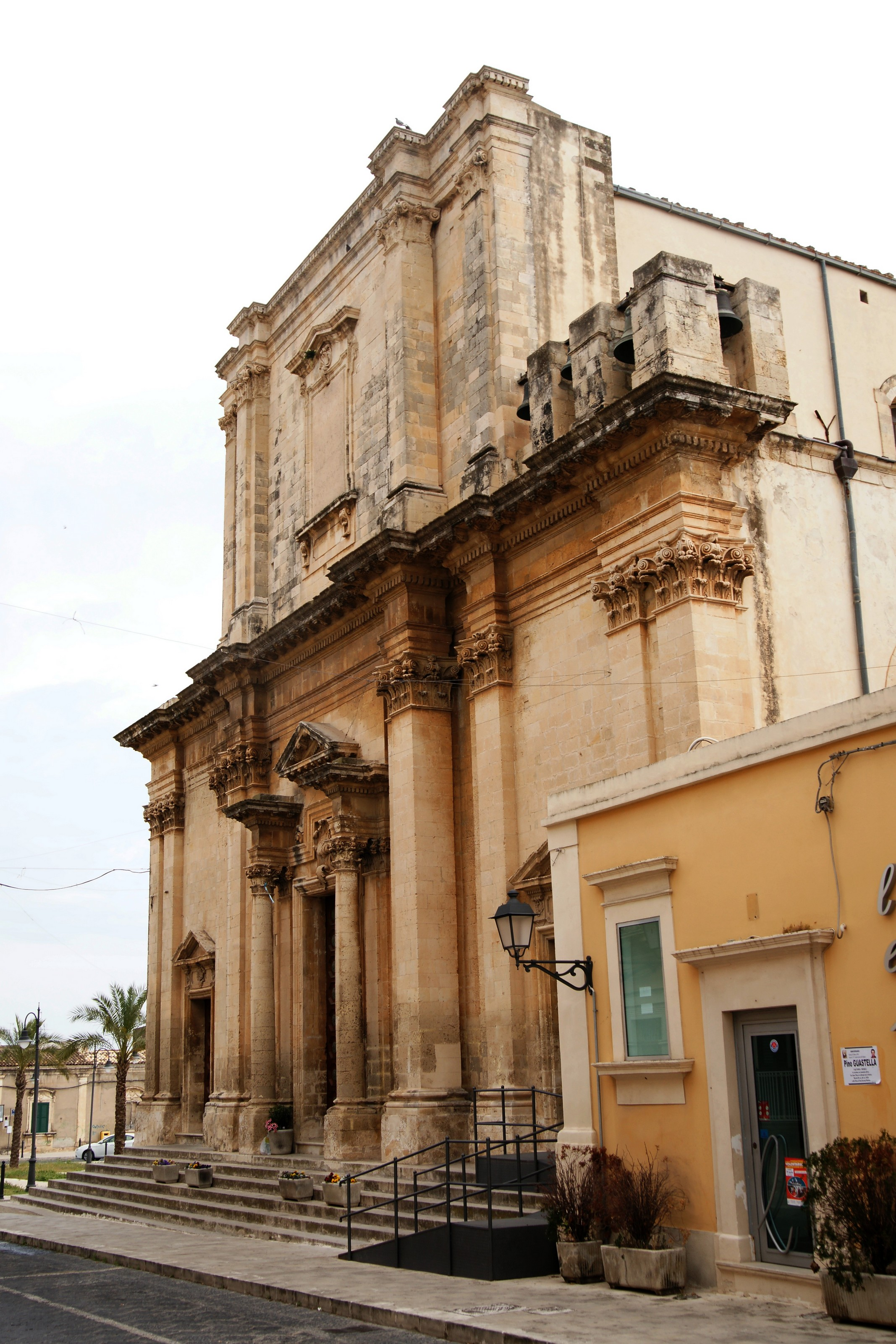
Incomplete facade of San Giovanni Battista

San Giovanni Battista is a Baroque style church located on Piazza Trieste, where it intersects with Corso Vittorio Emanuele, in the town of Avola, province of Siracusa, region of Sicily, Italy.

== History and description ==
Construction of a church at the site took place from 1700 to 1744. It was refurbished in 1772 and reconsecrated in 1852. The facade remains unfinished. The interior has Neoclassical pilasters. The central nave is frescoed with scenes of the life of the titular saint, John the Baptist, by Gregorio Scalia. He also painted altarpieces in the lateral aisles. The main altarpiece is an 18th-century depicting the Baptism of Christ. There are also five canvases with the history of St Corrado. The wooden icon of the same saint was sculpted by Raffaele Abbate in 1874. The organ was built in 1866 by Sebastiano Calcerano Platania from Acireale.
