= Cassibile (river) =

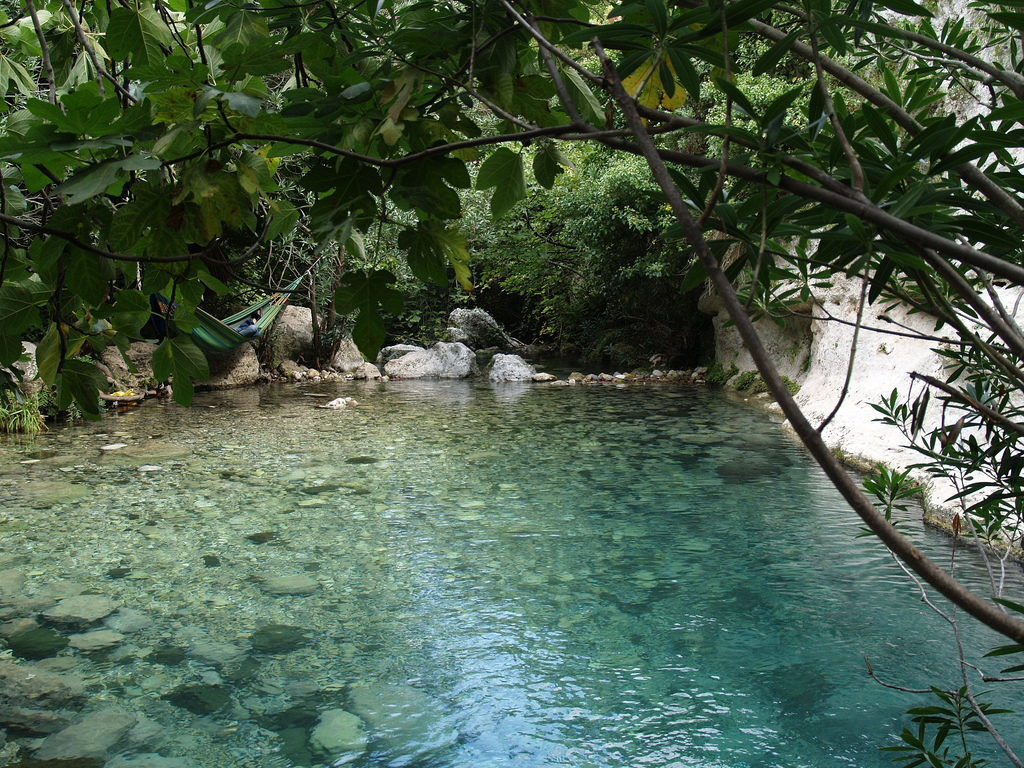
- Cavagrande del Cassibile

Location
- Country: Italy

Physical characteristics
- Source
  - location: Hyblaean Mountains
- Mouth: Ionian Sea
  - coordinates: 36.9478°N 15.19°E
- Length: 30 km (19 mi)

The Cassibile (Ancient Greek: Κακύπαρις, romanized: Kakyparis, Latin: Cacyparis) is a 30 km long river located in south-eastern Sicily. The river rises from the Serra Porcari, near Palazzolo Acreide, in the Hyblaean Mountains which forms the main part of the mountainous Sicilian southeast. It flows into the Ionian Sea between Capo Negro and Punta del Cane, 23 km south of Syracuse. The river has created a series of canyons and near Avola Antica several waterfalls and small lakes can be accessed by the ancient Scala Cruci staircase.

The river is mentioned by Thucydides during the retreat of the Athenians from Syracuse; From whom we learn that it was the first river they met with in proceeding along the coast road towards Helorus, and had a course of some length, so as to afford a passage up its valley into the interior.

== Nature reserve ==
The area of the canyons and lakes of the Cassibile were declared a Protected Area in 1990 by the regional government of Sicily when they created the Riserva naturale orientata Cavagrande del Cassibile.

== See also ==
- Cassibile (village)
