= Santissima Annunziata, Avola =

Church in Avola, Italy

Coordinates: 36.91059°N 15.13293°E

Santissima Annunziata is a Baroque style church located on Via Daniele Marin #51 in the town of Avola, province of Siracusa, region of Sicily, Italy.

== History and description ==
A church at the site was attached to the Benedictine monastery founded in 1532. The present church was begun in 1753 with an undulating facade, and attributed to Rosario Gagliardi and Vincenzo Sinatra. From 1768 onward the local architect Giuseppe Alessi designed the choir and altars. In 1777, the interior was decorated with stucco by Serafino Perollo, including allegorical statues depicting the cardinal virtues. The ceiling was painted with a Glory of Saint Benedict and Scholastica, an allegory of faith and charity.
