= Cavagrande del Cassibile =

Protected area in Italy

- Riserva naturale Cavagrande del Cassibile
- IUCN category IV (habitat/species management area)
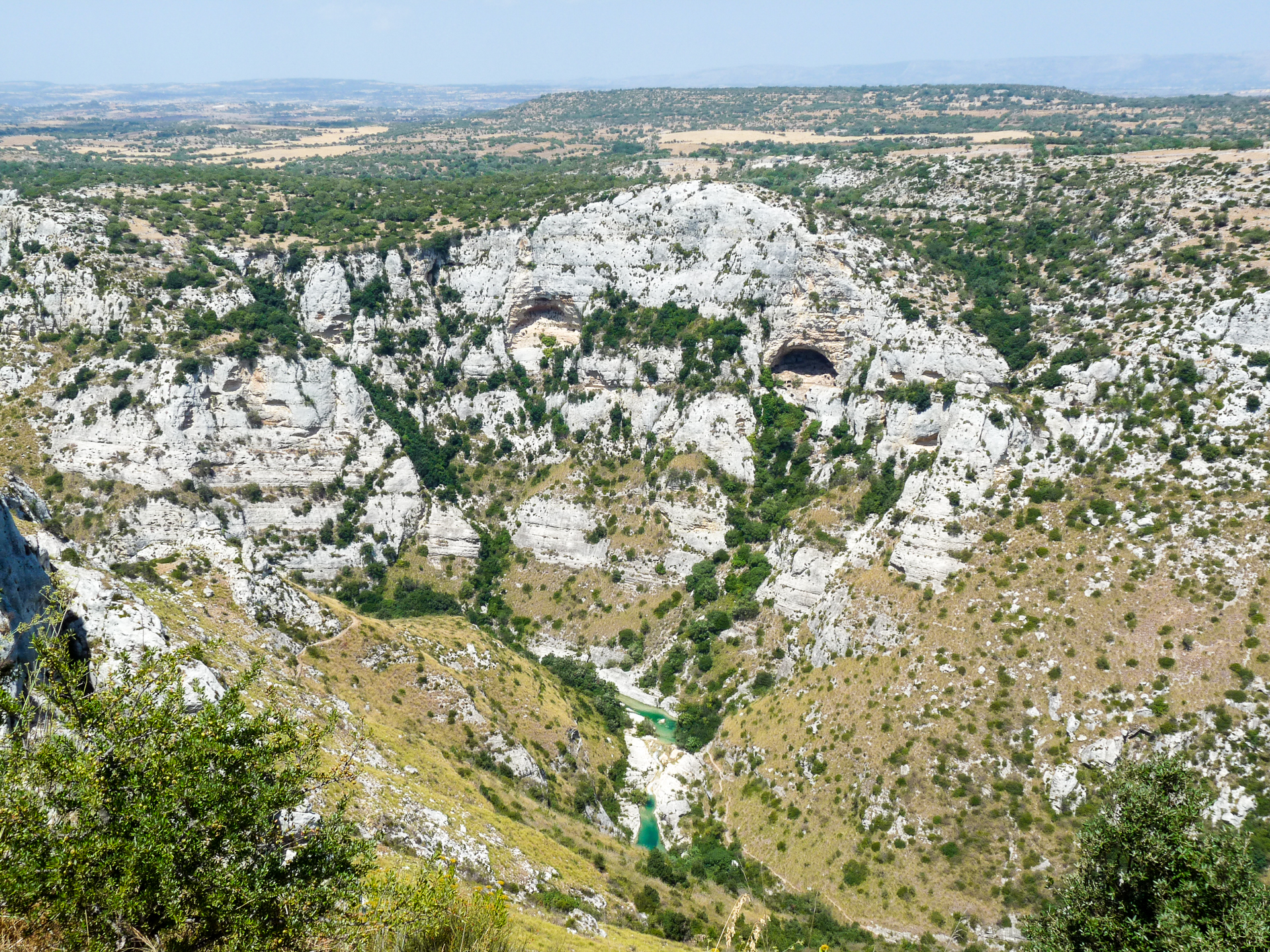
- Interactive map of Cavagrande del Cassibile
- Location: Avola, Noto, Syracuse, Province of Syracuse, Italy
- Coordinates: 36°57′5.54″N 15°11′13.03″E
- Area: 2,700 ha (6,672 acres)
- Established: 1990
- Governing body: Regione Siciliana
- Website: www.cavagrandedelcassibile.it

Cavagrande del Cassibile is a nature reserve near the towns of Avola, Noto, and Syracuse in the Province of Syracuse, Sicily, Italy.

It was established in 1990 and it extends for 2,700 ha (6,672 acres).

The reserve also contains the Necropolis of Cassibile.
