= Fontane Bianche =

- Frazione
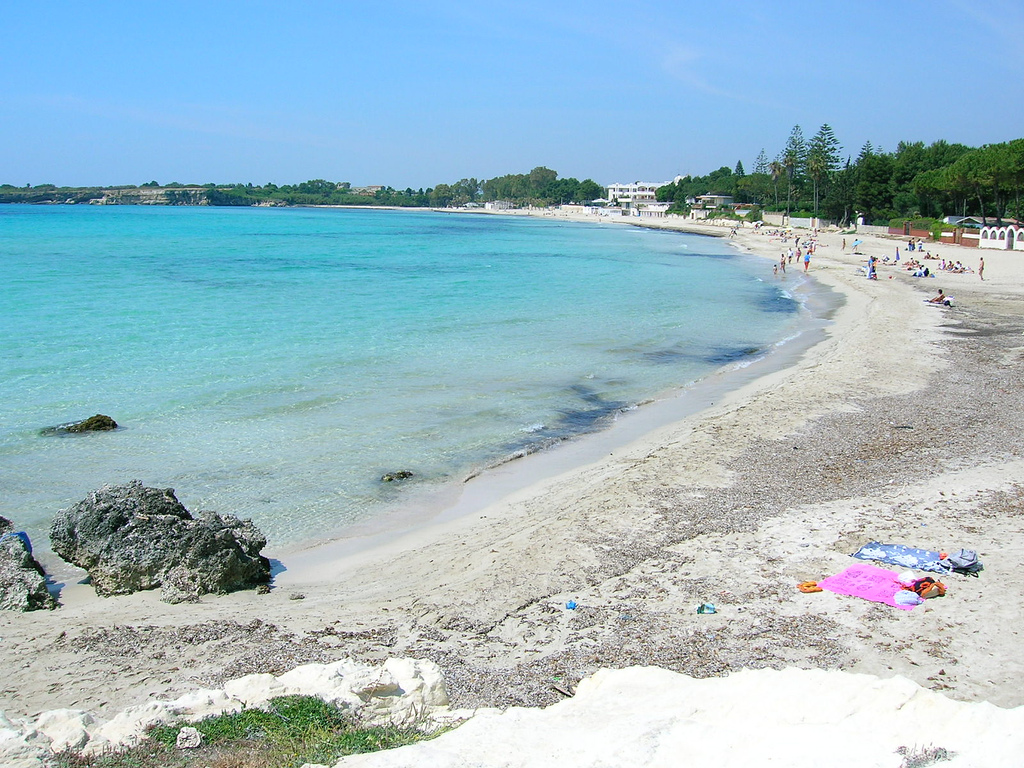
- Beach of Fontane Bianche

- Location of Fontane Bianche in Italy
- Coordinates: 36°57′54.004″N 15°12′53.622″E
- Country: Italy
- Region: Sicily
- Province: Syracuse (SR)
- Comune: Syracuse
- Elevation: 2 m (6.6 ft)

Population (2011)
  - Total: 889
- Time zone: UTC+1 (CET)
  - Summer (DST): UTC+2 (CEST)
- Postal code: 96100

Fontane Bianche is a southern Italian hamlet (frazione) of Syracuse in Sicily.

Fontane Bianche is located by the Ionian Sea coast of the island of Sicily and is 12 kilometres (7.5 mi) from Syracuse.

It has a population of 889.
