= Avola =

Avola À(v)ula (Sicilian)
- Comune
- Città di Avola
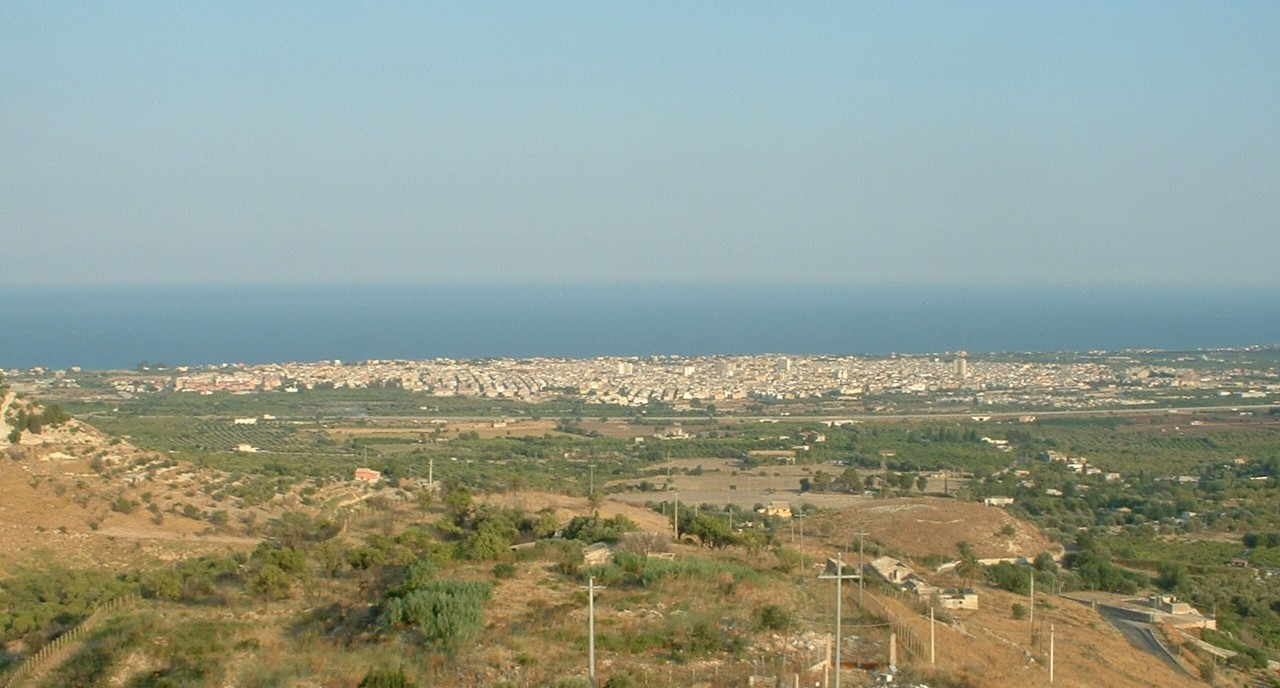
- Panoramic view

- Coat of arms

- Location within Italy Location within Sicily
- Coordinates: 36°55′N 15°08′E
- Country: Italy
- Region: Sicily
- Province: Syracuse (SR)
- Frazioni: Marina di Avola, Lido di Avola, Avola Antica

Government
  - Mayor: Rossana Cannata (Brothers of Italy)

Area
  - Total: 74.27 km^{2} (28.68 sq mi)
- Elevation: 40 m (130 ft)

Population (30 November 2017)
  - Total: 31,407
  - Density: 422.9/km^{2} (1,095/sq mi)
- Demonym: Avolesi
- Time zone: UTC+1 (CET)
  - Summer (DST): UTC+2 (CEST)
- Postal code: 96012
- Dialing code: 0931
- Patron saint: Santa Venera
- Saint day: Last Sunday in July
- Website: www.comune.avola.sr.it

Avola (Italian: [ˈaːvola]; Sicilian: Àvula/Àula, becoming Ràvula/Ràula if preceded by vowel; Latin: Abola) is a city and comune in the province of Syracuse, Sicily (southern Italy).

== History ==
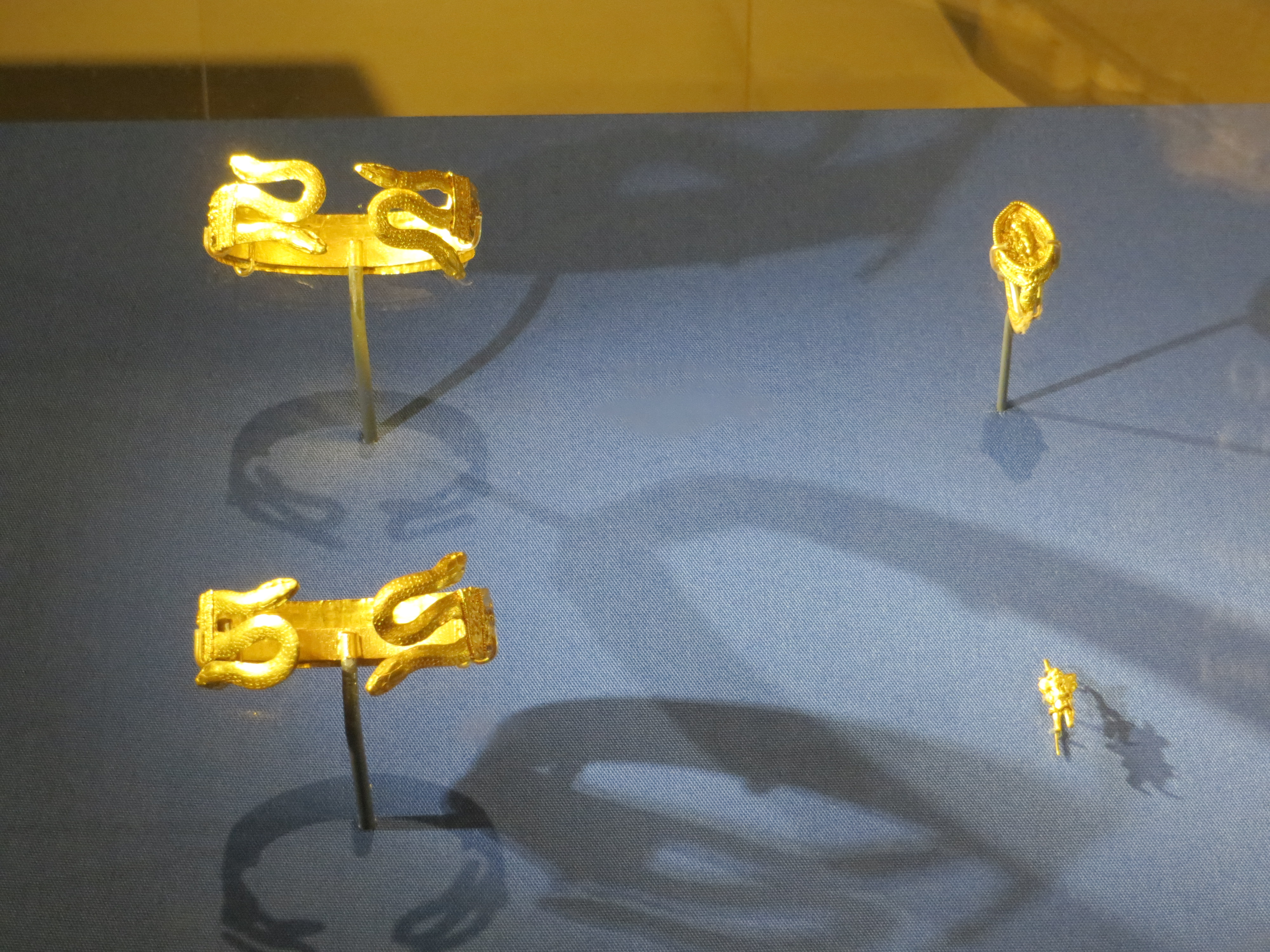
Part of the Ancient Greek Avola Hoard on display in the British Museum.

The foundation of the city in an area previously inhabited by the Sicani and invaded by the Sicels in the 13th-12th centuries BC, is perhaps connected to the city of Hybla Major. Hybla was the name of a pre-Greek divinity, later identified with the Greek Aphrodite. The Greeks colonized there in the 8th century. An important hoard of Ancient Greek gold jewellery and over 300 coins was found in the vicinity of Avola in 1914. Estimated to date between 370 and 300 BC, the extant items of ornate jewellery are now housed in the British Museum and comprise a pair of bracelets with double snake-heads, a finger-ring and an ear-ring with the figure of Eros.

When the Romans conquered Sicily in 227 BC, the city of Syracuse maintained some autonomy in the control of the area, which lasted until the Second Punic War (212 BC). Hybla disappeared in the early Middle Ages, and the territory started to be repopulated during the Islamic domination of Sicily (9th-11th centuries). However, the village near what is now Avola appeared only during the Norman or Hohenstaufen rule (12th-13th centuries).

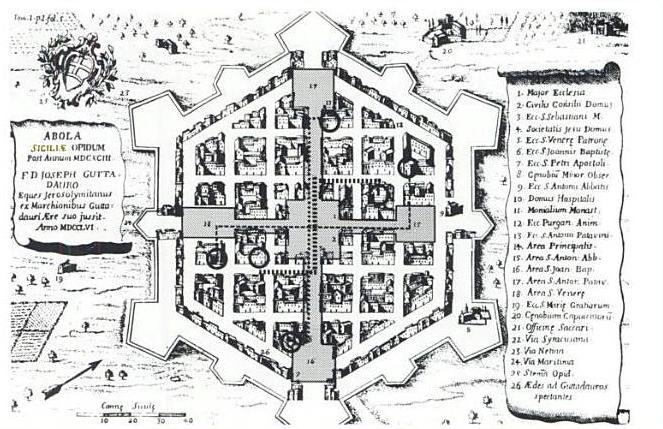
1756 print showing the layout of Avola.

The town became the feudal domain of the Pignatelli family. Like much of south-eastern Sicily, Avola was destroyed by an earthquake in 1693, and was refounded in a new location of the coast, under the design of friar architect Angelo Italia, having a geometric and regular plan. The town of Grammichele, also destroyed by the earthquake, was also relocated and rebuilt along a hexagonal layout.

Along the main road that goes to Syracuse is situated a megalithic monument, so-called "pseudo-dolmen" because of natural origin but adapted, in the prehistory, to experimental architectural elaboration.

=== World War II ===
During World War II, Avola was the place of one of the first Allied landings in Axis-held Europe during the Allied invasion of Sicily. The town, defended by Major Umberto Fontemaggi's 374th Coastal Battalion (part of the 206th Coastal Division), was attacked by three battalions of the 151st Infantry Brigade (part of the British 8th Army led by General Montgomery) and captured after several hours of fighting on 10 July 1943. General Montgomery's plan was to send a three-brigade front between Avola and Cassibile in the Gulf of Nito. It was to be led by Miles Dempsey's British 13th Corps. The plan was that as soon as Dempsey's forces had succeeded in establishing a beachhead they were to push northwards along the coast as quickly as possible, with the goal being to link up with other British forces in the effort to capture the Sicilian coastal towns of Syracuse, Augusta, Catania and airfields around the River Simeto. During the fighting in and around Avola between Montgomery's British soldiers and the Italian garrison there was an incident in which around seventy-five American paratroopers landed outside of the town, far away from where the British were already engaged in combat. The American GIs were over fifty miles away from their intended landing zone and decided to improvise, which in this case meant attempting to take the town by force on their own. They immediately became bogged down in a massive firefight and realized they had "bit off more than they could chew". In the course of the firefight the American GIs became pinned down in a square. At this point Major-General Sidney Kirkman's British 50th division "came to the rescue" by using a Bren carrier and blasted away the Italian forces who had pinned the Americans down. The Americans realized however that their ordeal would not be over until they could properly identify themselves so that the British wouldn't mistake them for Germans or Italians. They put their helmets on the end of sticks and waved them above the firing line while yelling that they were American. One British soldier exclaimed "What the bloody 'ell are you Yanks doing 'ere?" This incident led to the British and Americans making sure that in future operations their forces all used the same password so that they could more easily indentify one another in combat.

=== Modern times ===
On December 3, 1968, during the time period known as the Hot Autumn, Avola was the scene of an infamous massacre, when police opened fire on demonstrating day-labourers demanding the renewal of their contract. Two were killed and many wounded. This scene was depicted in the film Il Grande Sogno.

== Cuisine ==
The Nero d'Avola, a typical red wine of Sicily, is named after the city of Avola, where the first grafting of the vine was made, but its grapes may grow and the wine be produced in other regions of the island too.

The denomination Avola's Almond includes three different types of almond: Pizzuta, Fascionello and Romana or Corrente d'Avola. These three kinds of almond come from Avola's area. Blooming in winter, these almonds can only grow either in sea areas or on little hills, where frost rarely happens. Since Avola belongs to one of the sunniest towns in Sicily, this makes it one of the main production areas for almond.

Pizzuta and Fascionello are mainly used in the making of "Confetti", white sugared almonds, "Granita", ice slush, almond milk and other pastries, while Romana is only used for pastries and other bakery products.

== Tourism ==
Avola is famous for its numerous wide beaches with fine golden sand and clean, shining sea. In its hilly territory there is one of the largest canyon in Europe: Cavagrande del Cassibile oriented nature reserve, where it is possible to visit small lakes.

== Sights ==
- Chiesa Madre San Sebastiano, formerly San Nicoló
- Santa Venera
- San Giovanni Battista
- Santa Maria di Gesú
- Sant'Antonio Abate
- Santissima Annunziata and Badia (abbey)
- Santa Croce o dei Cappuccini
- Teatro Garibaldi
- Palazzo di Cittá
- Vecchio Mercato
- Torretta dell’Orologio
- Eremo di Avola Antica: ruins
- Museo Palmento e Frantoio Midolo
- Villa romana e il Dolmen
- Rotonda in bay
