= John Godwin (Royal Navy officer) =

Royal Navy officer

- Born: 13 December 1919; Buenos Aires, Argentina
- Died: 2 February 1945 (aged 25); Sachsenhausen concentration camp, Oranienburg, Nazi Germany
- Military career
- Allegiance: United Kingdom
- Branch: Royal Navy
- Rank: Temporary Lieutenant RNVR
- Unit: No. 14 (Arctic) Commando
- Awards: World War II: Commando actions; Commando actions in Norway; Operation Checkmate (POW); Nazi concentration camps; Sachsenhausen concentration camp (executed)

Temporary Lieutenant John Godwin, RNVR (13 December 1919 – 2 February 1945) was a British naval officer. Born and brought up in Argentina, he took part in a raid named Operation Checkmate on Axis shipping near Haugesund, north of Stavanger, Norway. His party managed to sink a minesweeper and a number of steamers using limpet mines, but he was eventually captured with the rest of his party, a commando sergeant, two naval Petty Officers and three seamen. Initially, they were held in Grini concentration camp. This was the same camp where, in January 1943, the Germans executed five commando survivors of Operation Freshman. However, Godwin and his comrades were not executed at Grini, but instead sent to Sachsenhausen concentration camp, where, contrary to the Geneva Convention, they were forced to march 30 miles a day on cobbles wearing in army boots.

On 2 February 1945, they were led to execution, in accordance with Hitler's Commando Order of 1942. Godwin managed to wrestle the pistol of the firing party commander from his belt and shoot him dead before being himself shot. No superior officer witnessed this act so a decoration could not be awarded. However, his bravery was mentioned in dispatches (posthumously). The citation, in The London Gazette, 9 October 1945, read: "For great gallantry and inspiring example whilst a prisoner of war in German hands in Norway and afterwards at Sachsenhausen, near Oranienburg, Germany, 1942–1945".

== Sources ==
- Volunteers from Argentina who gave their lives in WWII. Memorial
- CWGC entry
- M. R. D. Foot & J. M. Langley 1979 MI9 – Escape and Evasion 1939–1945, London, Book Club Associates, London, 1979 pp. 154, 155 ISBN 0-316-28840-3
- Reilly, Joanne (1997). "Appendix: Belsen Testimonies". Belsen in History and Memory. Routledge. pp. 216–217. ISBN 0-7146-4767-5.
- Gilbert, Sir Martin (2004). The Second World War: A Complete History. MacMillan. pp. 637. ISBN 0-8050-7623-9.
