= Operation Sunstar =

1941 British Commando raid on Houlgate, Normandy

Operation Sunstar was a Second World War raid on Houlgate in Normandy, France over the night of 22/23 November 1941.

British Commandos of No. 9 Commando took part in the raid. Their objective was the Batterie de Tournebride on the Butte de Houlgate. Ninety men of No. 9 Commando travelled across the English Channel on HMS Prince Leopold and landed at the bottom of the Vaches Noires. The ship also transported four Assault Landing Craft, which were used for the landing, while four Motor Gun Boats provided cover.

The operation encountered several difficulties. At first there was no sign of any Germans, but soon the area was illuminated by flares and searchlights. Trucks were seen approaching, so the raiders still on the beach swam out after exchanging torch signals with the cover party. The LCA gunners withheld their fire in order not to reveal their position. During this time another raider party called at a farmhouse, and was informed that the arrival of a two-man German bicycle patrol was imminent. The raiders set a rope across the road to dismount the Germans, but no sooner had they done this than a Junkers Ju 87 dive-bomber attacked the waiting LCAs.

Private J. Davidson, a Bren gunner on one of the LCAs, now discovered that his LCA was half full of water and had only one engine operative. Even so, as the dive-bomber made a second strafing attack, Davidson managed to put two bursts into the aeroplane.

The Commandos did not succeed in destroying the battery or taking any prisoners but they did obtain documents and other information.
