= Operation Partridge =

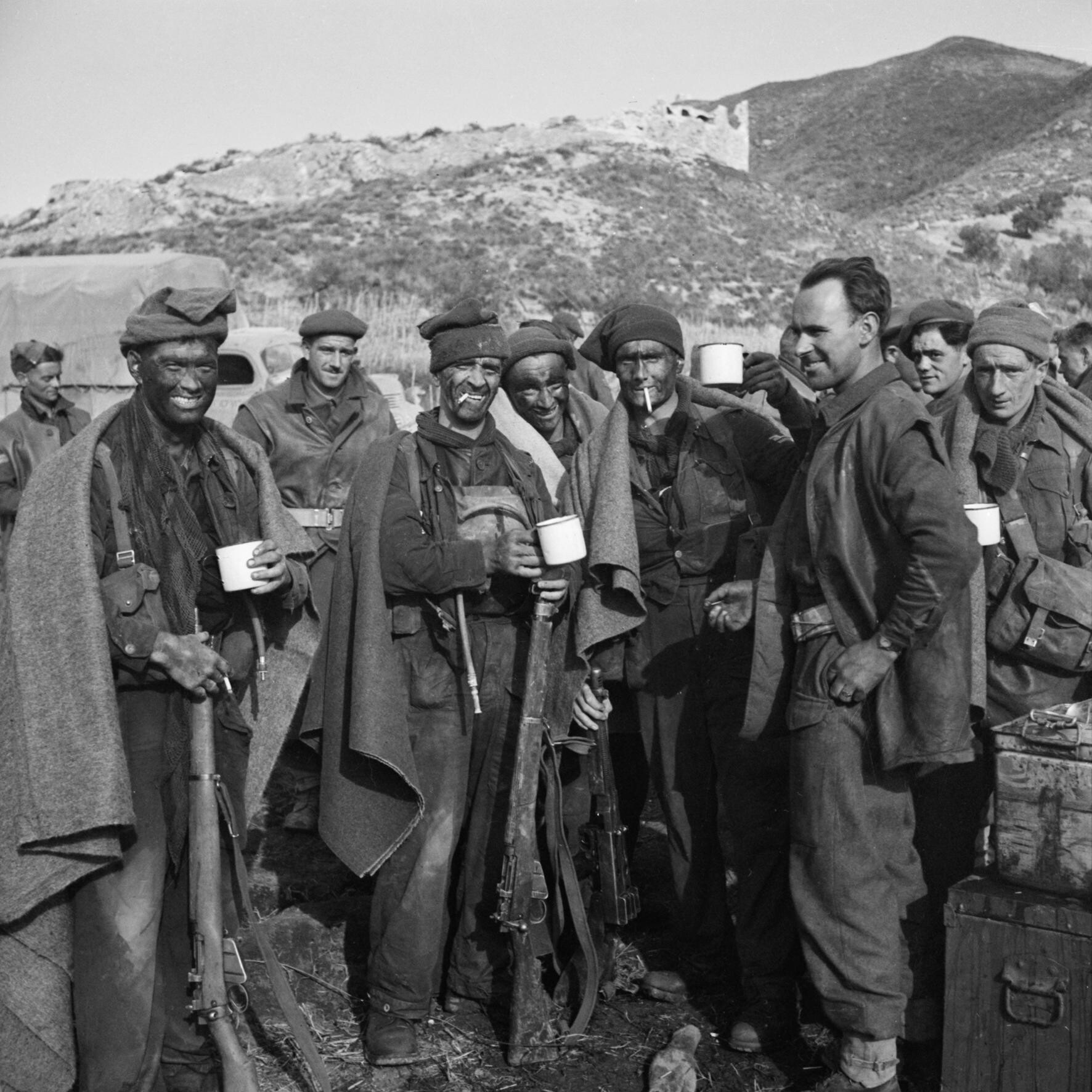
No. 9 Commando following Operation Partridge

Operation Partridge was a British Commando raid during the Second World War. It was carried out during the Italian Campaign by No. 9 Commando as a diversionary raid behind the German lines, to cover the withdrawal of the X Corps in preparation for its proposed assault across the Garigliano river.

No. 9 Commando were landed on the north shore of the estuary by the Royal Navy during the night of 29/30 December 1943. They were 95 minutes late and 1,000 yards (910 m) away from their correct landing beach. The commando attacked several German positions before withdrawing across the river in DUKWs, apart from No.4 and No.6 troops who had to cross 2,700 yards (2,500 m) upriver by using ropes and swimming. The operation cost the commando nine killed but they did capture 29 prisoners.
