= No. 9 Commando =

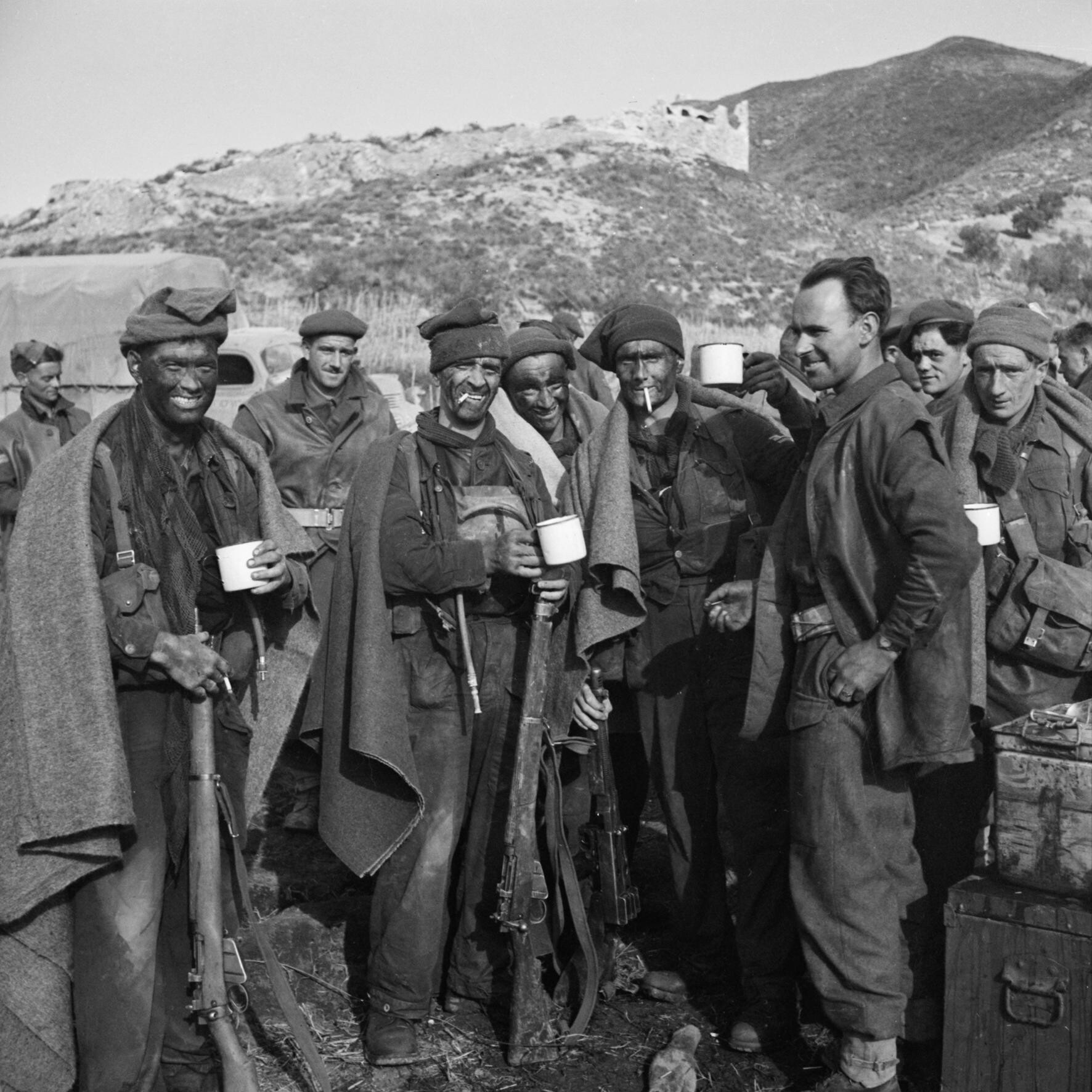
- Men from No. 9 Commando the morning after Operation Partridge near the Garigliano river, 30 December 1943.
- Active: 1940–46
- Country: United Kingdom
- Branch: British Army
- Type: Commando
- Role: Special forces
- Size: 500 men all ranks
- Part of: 2nd Special Service Brigade
- Engagements: Second World War: Operation Sunstar; Italy; Operation Partridge; Operation Shingle; Greece; Yugoslavia; Aegean; Operation Darlington 11; Operation Gradient I

Commanders
- Notable commanders: Ronnie Tod

Insignia
- Combined Operations Shoulder Patch

No. 9 Commando was a battalion-sized British Commando unit raised by the British Army during the Second World War. It took part in raids across the English Channel and in the Mediterranean, ending the war in Italy as part of the 2nd Special Service Brigade. Like all Army commando units it was disbanded in 1946.

== Background ==
The commandos were formed in 1940, by the order of Winston Churchill, the British Prime Minister. He called for specially trained troops that would "develop a reign of terror down the enemy coast". At first it was a small force of volunteers who carried out small raids against enemy occupied territory, but by 1943 the unit's role had changed into lightly equipped assault Infantry which specialised in spearheading amphibious landings.

The man initially selected as the overall commander of the force was Admiral Sir Roger Keyes; himself a veteran of the landings at Galipoli and the Zeebrugge raid in the First World War. Keyes resigned in October 1941 and was replaced by Admiral Louis Mountbatten.

By the autumn of 1940, more than 2,000 men had volunteered for commando training, and what became known as the Special Service Brigade was formed into 12 units called commandos. Each commando would number around 450 men, who were commanded by a lieutenant colonel. They were sub-divided into troops of 75 men and further divided into 15-man sections. Commandos were all volunteers seconded from other British Army regiments; they retained their own cap badges and remained on their regimental roll for pay. All volunteers went through the six-week intensive commando course at Achnacarry. The course in the Scottish Highlands, concentrated on fitness, speed marches, weapons training, map reading, climbing, small boat operations and demolitions, both by day and by night.

By 1943 the commandos had moved away from small raiding operations and had been formed into brigades of assault infantry to spearhead future Allied landing operations. Three units were left un-brigaded to carry out smaller-scale raids.

== History ==
The men of No. 9 Commando were originally from No. 6 and No. 7 Independent Companies. They had been amalgamated in the autumn of 1940 in the 2nd Special Service Battalion, under the command of Lieutenant Colonel J.M. Saegert. After the general reorganisation of the commando units, they were re-designated No. 9 Commando and based in Criccieth in Wales.

No. 9 Commando undertook its first raid, Operation Sunstar, on the night of 22/23 November 1941 on the French coast at Houlgate. The raid was a success; the men landed and evacuated without any loss. After this raid, leadership of the commando was taken over by Lieutenant Colonel Ronnie Tod.

The next operation that men from No. 9 were involved in was the St. Nazaire Raid in March 1942. The main landing force was provided by No. 2 Commando but most of the other commando units supplied demolition parties to assist in disabling the port facilities.

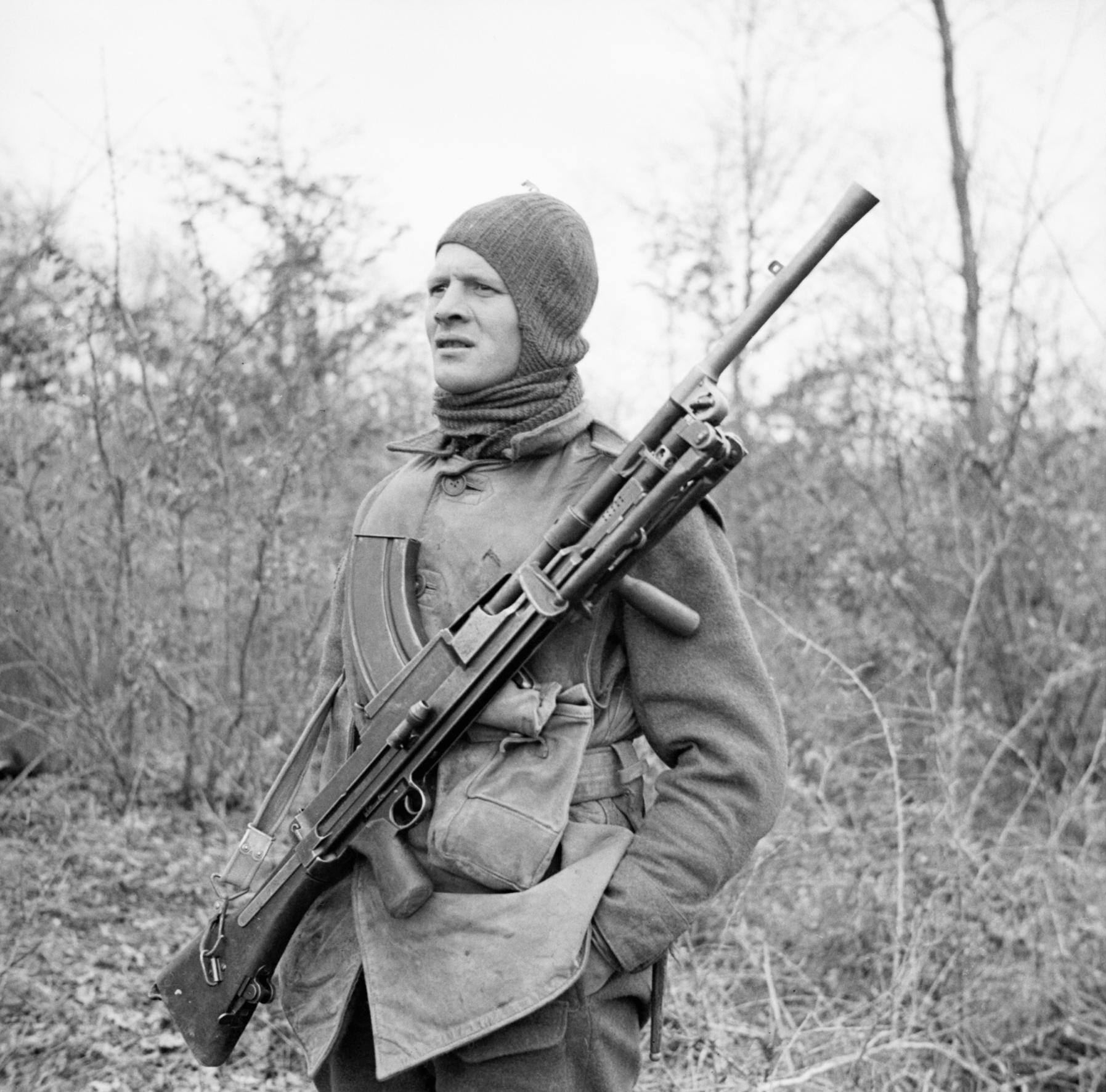
A member of No. 9 Commando at Anzio, 5 March 1944

The men were then used to reinforce the Gibraltar garrison during Operation Torch, the landings in French North Africa. They remained in Gibraltar until November 1943 when they carried out raids on the islands of Tremiti and Pianosa.

During the Allied invasion of Italy, as part of the 2nd Special Service Brigade the men were involved in Operation Partridge in December 1943 in the area of the Garigliano River. This was followed by Operation Shingle, the Anzio landings and fighting at Monte Ornito before being withdrawn to Naples in March 1944.

In 1944, No. 9 Commando were involved in Operation Darlington 11 in May and Operation Gradient I in August. The latter mission saw the No. 9 blowing up a bridge in the Northern Adriatic. They then operated in Greece before returning to Italy and taking part Operation Roast, the crossing of Commachio Lagoon and the battle of the Argenta Gap in April 1945. The Second World War in Europe ended in May 1945 and in 1946 all the Army Commando units were disbanded.

== Battle honours ==
The following battle honours were awarded to the British Commando units during the Second World War.

- Adriatic
- Alethangyaw
- Aller
- Anzio
- Argenta Gap
- Burma 1943–45
- Crete
- Dieppe
- Dives Crossing
- Djebel Choucha
- Flushing
- Greece 1944–45
- Italy 1943–45
- Kangaw
- Landing at Porto San Venere
- Landing in Sicily
- Leese
- Litani
- Madagascar
- Middle East 1941, 1942, 1944
- Monte Ornito
- Myebon
- Normandy Landing
- North Africa 1941–43
- North-West Europe 1942, 1944–1945
- Norway 1941
- Pursuit to Messina
- Rhine
- St. Nazaire
- Salerno
- Sedjenane 1
- Sicily 1943
- Steamroller Farm
- Syria 1941
- Termoli
- Vaagso
- Valli di Comacchio
- Westkapelle

== Recognition ==
Operation Gradient I became a well-known example of military demolition that is studied and taught today in the Royal Navy Commandos. The Commando Comics issue "Strike Swift - Strike Sure" is based around the exploits of the No. 9 Commandos.
