= Operation Checkmate (commando raid) =

Raid on shipping at Haugesund, Norway in April 1943

- Part of Raids and Commando Actions in Norway during World War II
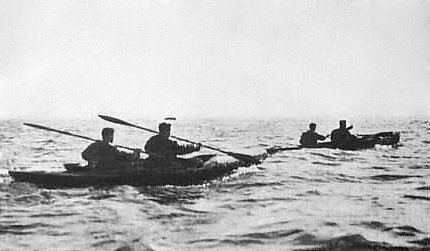
- Cockles (photograph taken during Operation Frankton)
| Date | 28 April – 15 May 1943 |
| Location | Haugesund, Norway 59°26′47″N 05°17′54″E |
| Result | British victory |

Belligerents
| United Kingdom | Nazi Germany |

Commanders and leaders
| Lieutenant John Godwin RNVR | |

Units involved
| No. 14 (Arctic) Commando | |

Strength
| Seven men | |

Casualties and losses
| 7 (POW); 6 executed 1 died of Typhus | One minesweeper sunk |
- Haugesund, a city and municipality in Rogaland county, Norway

Operation Checkmate was the codename for a raid on shipping at Haugesund, Norway in April 1943 during the Second World War by British Commandos. The raiding party consisted of seven men of No. 14 (Arctic) Commando who managed to sink one ship using limpet mines. While waiting in hiding for the transport back to the United Kingdom they were captured on 14 and 15 May 1943 and eventually taken to Sachsenhausen and Belsen concentration camps where six of them were executed, victims of the Commando Order. The seventh man died of typhus.

== Background ==
Operation Checkmate was the last of twelve commando raids on the Norwegian coast during the Second World War. The raiding party assembled for the operation was composed of one officer and six other ranks from No. 14 (Arctic) Commando (Lieutenant Colonel E. A. M. Wedderburn). The commando had been formed in late 1942, to conduct operations inside the Arctic circle, following the request of the Chief of Combined Operations Headquarters Louis Mountbatten to meet the demand for further raids in Norway. No. 14 (Arctic) Commando was composed of No. 1 (Boating) Troop which had an establishment of nine officers and 18 other ranks who specialized in small boat operations and No. 2 Troop which had an establishment of six officers and 22 other ranks who specialized in cross-country skiing and mountain climbing.

The commando was intended for attacks on the Kriegsmarine and Luftwaffe bases in Norway, from which the Germans were attacking the Allied Arctic Convoys. For Operation Checkmate the men selected for the raid came from No. 1 (Boating) Troop. The raid commander was Lieutenant John Godwin, Royal Navy Volunteer Reserve, who was originally from Buenos Aires, Argentina. The rest of the raiding party comprised one British Army sergeant—Victor John Cox, on attachment from No. 12 Commando; two Royal Navy petty officers—Alfred John Roe and Harold Hiscock; and three Royal Navy able seaman—Neville Arthur Burgess, Keith Mayor and Andrew Anthony West. Their mission was to attack shipping in Oslo and Kopervik in the Haugesund by entering the harbours by canoe and attaching limpet mines to ships' hulls.

== Mission ==
The commandos of the raiding force were transported across the North Sea by Motor Torpedo Boat. On arrival in Norwegian waters they set up their patrol base on the island of Vestre Bokn, before the Motor Torpedo Boat left them and returned to the United Kingdom. The raiding party were left with a small fishing coble and their canoes. It was always intended that the Motor Torpedo Boat would return at a later date and transport them back to the United Kingdom.

The commandos had been issued with two canoes with which to carry out their mission. Lieutenant Godwin and Able Seaman Burgess made one crew and the other was Able Seamen Mayor and West. Their plan was for the coble, under the cover of darkness, to move within striking distance of their targets and then use the canoes to get in closer and plant their limpet mines. They only managed to sink one German ship, a minesweeper, M 5207. However, a captured German document when translated quotes "a number of German steamers were sunk in Oslo and Kopervik". This report covers the ship sunk during this operation and the ones that the Oslogjengen (the Oslo gang), sank in Oslo. The two canoes then returned to the location where the coble had been. It had been moved by the three remaining soldiers, with the assistance of Norwegian civilians, to a safer location further inland in an attempt to get it fixed but it had to be left by the crew.The two canoes then moved westward, towards the Urter islands, where they waited for their MTB pickup. The party was eventually captured on 14 May 1943 after an extensive search by the German Army, police and Norwegian civilians. The day after, the four men on Urter were also captured. They were held at the Grini concentration camp and interrogated, before they were handed over to the Sicherheitsdienst (SD) and transported to Sachsenhausen concentration camp in Germany.

== Aftermath ==
Sachsenhausen Concentration Camp memorial plaque for British and Commonwealth forces

All involved in Operation Checkmate were captured in uniform and should have been treated as prisoners of war. However, in 1942 Adolf Hitler had issued the Commando Order that stipulated that all captured commandos, no matter if they were in uniform or not, were to be executed shortly after interrogation.

While at Sachsenhausen concentration camp, the men from Operation Checkmate were forced into breaking in German Army boots by marching 30 miles (48 km) a day over cobblestones. Five of the team excluding Mayor and Roe were executed on 2 February 1945. Mayor and Roe were transferred to Belsen concentration camp, where Mayor was executed on 7 April 1945 and Roe died of Typhus. Godwin was posthumously Mentioned in Despatches on 9 November 1945, "For great gallantry and inspiring example whilst a prisoner of war in German hands in Norway and afterwards at Sachsenhausen, near Oranienburg, Germany, 1942-1945." He is commemorated on the Portsmouth Naval Memorial, one of the memorials for those of the naval service with no known grave. Mayor was posthumously Mentioned on 22 April 1947, "for great fortitude and resolution while in the hands of the Germans, from the time of his capture in 1943 to the time of his death at Belsen in April 1945" and is commemorated on the Plymouth Naval Memorial. Cox is commemorated on the Brookwood Memorial. Roe is also commemorated on the Portsmouth Naval Memorial, Hiscock on the Lowestoft Naval Memorial, Burgess on the Chatham Naval Memorial, and West also on the Plymouth Naval Memorial.

== See also ==
- Operation Framptom
