= Andrew Croft =

Colonel Noel Andrew Cotton Croft, DSO, OBE (30 November 1906 – 26 June 1998) was a member of the Special Operations Executive in World War II, with operations in Norway and Corsica, as well as military attaché to Sweden. He was also an Arctic explorer, holding the longest self-supporting dog-sledge journey in the Guinness Book of Records for 60 years (across Greenland), and Commandant of the Cadet Corps of the Metropolitan Police Service.

== Early life ==
Noel Andrew Croft was born on 30 November 1906, St Andrews Day, in Stevenage in Hertfordshire where his father, Robert, was the local vicar. After two prep schools, he attended Lancing College, before becoming one of the founding pupils at Stowe School, and then going up to Christ Church, Oxford in 1925.

== Career as an explorer ==
Croft participated in several Arctic expeditions.

In 1934, along with Lieutenant A.S.T. Godfrey Lieutenant Arthur Godfrey of the Royal Engineers and Martin Lindsay, Croft participated in the 1934 British Trans-Greenland Expedition which mapped the Crown Prince Frederick Range as the expedition photographer and dog-handler. To do so, he learned to speak Danish and Greenlandic and learned to be an expert dog-driver.

He served as the second-in-command of the Oxford University Arctic Expedition, 1935–36, under A. R. Glen, a glaciologist. The expedition, under the auspices of the Oxford University Exploration Club, was a fourteen-month-long scientific survey of North-East Land.

He was a recipient of the Polar Medal in 1942 and of the Royal Geographical Society's Back Award in 1947.

== War service and army career ==
During World War II Croft served with the British Army in Finland, Norway, and Sweden before returning to active service with No. 14 (Arctic) Commando. He served with a Special Forces unit behind enemy lines in Tunisia, and was then given an independent command in the Special Operations Executive (SOE) to operate small motor boats out of Calvi in Northern Corsica. Covert missions were carried out to the Italian and French coasts, where secret agents and equipment were landed and picked up. In 1944, he was parachuted into Southern France to organise the French Resistance there. He was awarded the Distinguished Service Order (DSO) on 15 March 1945. Following the end of the war he was granted a regular commission on 21 May 1949, backdated to his original commissioning.

== Later life ==
On 24 July 1952, he married Rosalind Madden, the widow of an Irish Guards officer.

He stepped down with his leader, Eric Shipton, from the 1953 Everest Expedition which summitted the mountain that year.

In the 1950s he was appointed as the commandant of the Army Apprentice School, Harrogate.

In 1960, Croft became the first Commandant of the Metropolitan Police's Hendon Police Cadet College, and was appointed Officer of the Order of the British Empire (OBE) in the 1970 New Year Honours for his successful development of the Corps of Cadets. In 1968, he served as a member of the organising committee for an Arctic exploration expedition led by Wally Herbert. A member of the expedition, Allan Gill, suffered a serious lower back injury requiring his evacuation.

== Publications ==
- Polar Exploration: Epics of the Twentieth Century
- A Talent for Adventure. The Self-Publishing Association, 1991
