= Timberforce =

Timberforce was the name given to units of No. 12 Commando and No. 14 (Arctic) Commando formed in the British Army at various times between 1943 and 1944 for raids and reconnaissance of the Norwegian coastline.

A detachment of 32 all ranks from No. 47 (Royal Marine) Commando under Capt. K R Isherwood formed Timberforce from 4 October 1943 to 24 March 1944. It was tasked to defend the Shetland Islands as necessary, participate in clandestine Shetland bus operations and observe Norwegian coast.
