= No. 14 (Arctic) Commando =

- Active: 1942–1943
- Country: (United Kingdom)
- Allegiance: United Kingdom
- Branch: British Army
- Type: Commando
- Role: Coastal raiding force
- Size: around 60 men
- Part of: Combined Operations
- Engagements: Second World War

Insignia
- Combined Operations Shoulder Patch

No. 14 (Arctic) Commando sometimes also called the Special Commando Boating Group, was a 60-man Commando unit of the British Army during the Second World War. The commando was formed in 1942 for service in the Arctic and was disbanded in 1943.

== Background ==
The commandos were formed in 1940, by the order of Winston Churchill the British Prime Minister. He called for specially trained troops that would "develop a reign of terror down the enemy coast". At first they were a small force of volunteers who carried out small raids against enemy occupied territory, but by 1943 their role had changed into lightly equipped assault Infantry which specialised in spearheading amphibious landings.

The man initially selected as the overall commander of the force was Admiral Sir Roger Keyes himself a veteran of the landings at Galipoli and the Zeebrugge raid in the First World War. Keyes resigned in October 1941 and was replaced by Admiral Louis Mountbatten.

By the autumn of 1940 more than 2,000 men had volunteered for commando training, and what became known as the Special Service Brigade was formed into 12 units called commandos. Each commando would number around 450 men commanded by a lieutenant colonel. They were sub divided into troops of 75 men and further divided into 15-man sections. Commandos were all volunteers seconded from other British Army regiments and retained their own cap badges and remained on their regimental roll for pay. All volunteers went through the six-week intensive commando course at Achnacarry. The course in the Scottish Highlands concentrated on fitness, speed marches, weapons training, map reading, climbing, small boat operations and demolitions both by day and by night.

By 1943 the commandos had moved away from small raiding operations and had been formed into brigades of assault infantry to spearhead future Allied landing operations. Three units were left un-brigaded to carry out smaller-scale raids, No. 12 Commando, No. 62 Commando and No. 14 (Arctic) Commando.

== History ==
No. 14 (Arctic) Commando was formed in late 1942, for action in the Arctic especially against Kriegsmarine and Luftwaffe bases in Norway used to attack Arctic Convoys. No. 14 Commando was formed at the request of the Chief of Combined Operation Louis Mountbatten to meet the demand for further raids in Norway. Under the command of Lieutenant Colonel E.A.M Wedderburn No. 14 Commando comprised two troops. No. 1 (Boating) Troop of nine officers and 18 men who specialized in small boat operations and No. 2 Troop of six officers and 22 men who specialized in cross-country skiing.

The Commando contained British, Canadians and Norwegians and included polar explorers including Sir Peter Scott, David Haig-Thomas, Andrew Croft, August Courtauld and some men from the Royal Navy Volunteer Reserve. They specialised in using canoes and kayaks for limpet mine attacks in Arctic waters. At times it supplied men for the ad hoc formations Northforce and Timberforce. In 1943, No. 5 (Norwegian) Troop, No. 10 (Inter-Allied), No. 12 and No. 14 (Arctic) Commandos raided the Norwegian coast from their base in Lerwick in the Shetland Islands. In April seven men of No. 14 (Arctic) Commando took part in Operation Checkmate a raid on German shipping near Haugesund. They managed to sink one minesweeper using limpet mines, but were captured and eventually taken to Sachsenhausen and Belsen Concentration Camps where they were executed. No. 14 (Arctic) Commando was disbanded late 1943 to supply reinforcements to other commando formations.

== Legacy ==
All the army commandos were disbanded after the Second World War and the commando role was taken over by the Royal Marines. However the present day Parachute Regiment, Special Air Service and Special Boat Service can all trace their origins to the commandos.

== Battle honours ==
The following Battle honours were awarded to the British Commandos during the Second World War.

- Adriatic
- Alethangyaw
- Aller
- Anzio
- Argenta Gap
- Burma 1943–45
- Crete
- Dieppe
- Dives Crossing
- Djebel Choucha
- Flushing
- Greece 1944–45
- Italy 1943–45
- Kangaw
- Landing at Porto San Venere
- Landing in Sicily
- Leese
- Litani
- Madagascar
- Middle East 1941, 1942, 1944
- Monte Ornito
- Myebon
- Normandy Landing
- North Africa 1941–43
- North-West Europe 1942, 1944–1945
- Norway 1941
- Pursuit to Messina
- Rhine
- St. Nazaire
- Salerno
- Sedjenane 1
- Sicily 1943
- Steamroller Farm
- Syria 1941
- Termoli
- Vaagso
- Valli di Comacchio
- Westkapelle
