= Commandos (United Kingdom) =

British special operations force during World War II

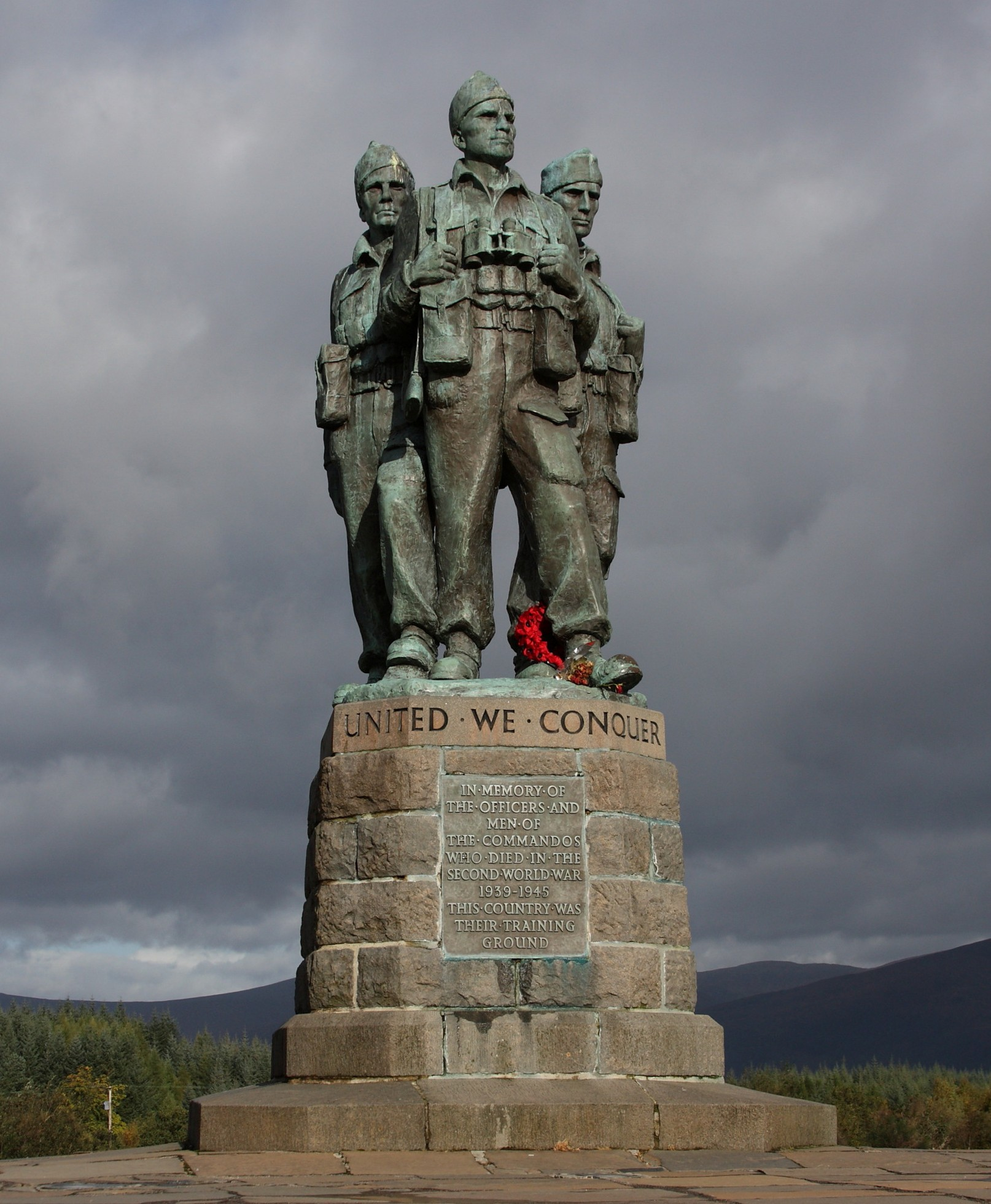
- The Commando Memorial
- Active: 1940–1946
- Country: United Kingdom
- Branch: British Army; Royal Navy; Royal Air Force
- Type: Commando
- Role: Coastal raiding Special operations Light infantry
- Part of: Combined Operations
- Engagements: Second World War

Commanders
- Notable commanders: Robert Laycock; John Durnford-Slater; Lord Lovat; Ronnie Tod

Insignia
- Combined Operations Tactical recognition flash

The Commandos, also known as the British Commandos, were formed during the Second World War in June 1940, following a request from Winston Churchill, for special forces that could carry out raids against German-occupied Europe. Initially drawn from within the British Army from soldiers who volunteered for the Special Service Brigade, the Commandos' ranks were eventually filled by members of all branches of the British Armed Forces and a number of foreign volunteers from German-occupied countries. By the end of the war 25,000 men had passed through the Commando course at Achnacarry. This total includes not only the British volunteers, but volunteers from Greece, France, Belgium, Netherlands, Canada, Norway and Poland. The United States Army Rangers and US Marine Corps Raiders were modelled on the Commandos.

Reaching a wartime strength of over 30 units and four assault brigades, the Commandos served in all theatres of war from the Arctic Circle to Europe and from the Mediterranean and Middle East to South-East Asia. Their operations ranged from small groups of men landing from the sea or by parachute, to a brigade of assault troops spearheading the Allied invasions of Europe and Asia.

After the war most Commando units were disbanded, leaving only the 3 Commando Brigade of the Royal Marines, which is now known as the UK Commando Force. The modern Royal Marine Commandos, Parachute Regiment, Special Air Service, British Army Commandos and the Special Boat Service trace their origins to the Commandos. The Second World War Commando legacy also extends to mainland Europe and the United States: the French Commandos Marine; Dutch Korps Commandotroepen; Belgian Special Operations Regiment; the Greek 1st Raider–Paratrooper Brigade; the United States Army Rangers and Green Berets were influenced by the wartime Commandos.

== Formation ==
The British Commandos were a formation of the British Armed Forces organised for special service in June 1940. After the events leading to the British Expeditionary Force's (BEF) evacuation from Dunkirk, the disastrous Battle of France, Winston Churchill, the British Prime Minister, called for a force to be assembled and equipped to inflict casualties on the Germans and bolster British morale. Churchill told the joint chiefs of staff to propose measures for an offensive against German-occupied Europe. He stated in a minute to General Hastings Ismay on 6 June 1940: "Enterprises must be prepared, with specially-trained troops of the hunter class, who can develop a reign of terror down these coasts, first of all on the "butcher and bolt" policy..." The Chief of the Imperial General Staff at that time was General John Dill and his Military Assistant was Lieutenant-Colonel Dudley Clarke. Clarke discussed the matter with Dill at the War Office and prepared a paper for him that proposed the formation of a new force based on the tactics of Boer commandos, 'hit sharp and quick – then run to fight another day'; they became 'The Commandos' from then onwards. Dill, aware of Churchill's intentions, approved Clarke's proposal. The first commando raid, Operation Collar, was conducted on the night of 24/25 June 1940.

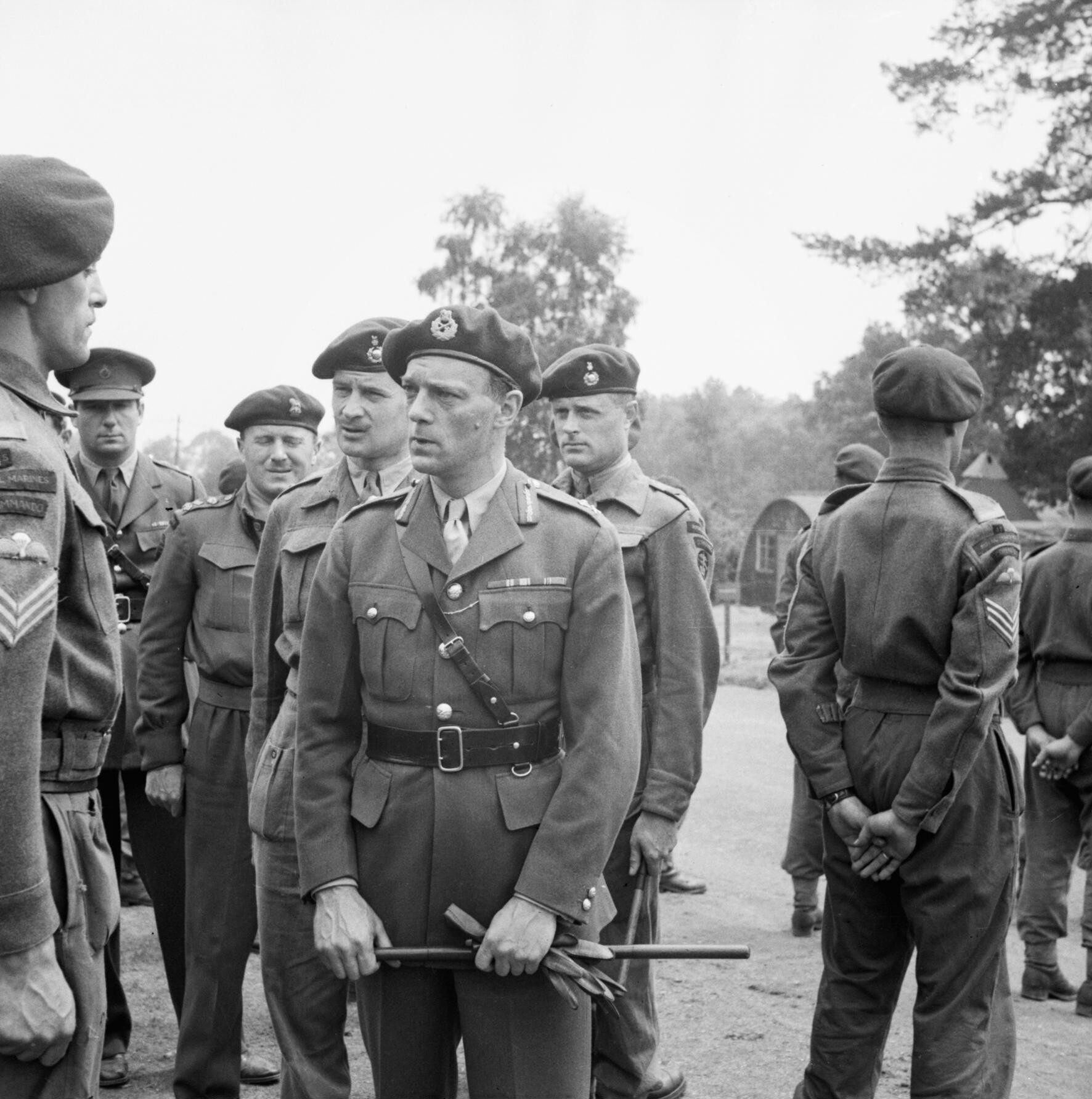
Major-General Robert Laycock, inspecting Royal Marines Commandos shortly before the Normandy landings, 1944.

The request for volunteers for special service was initially restricted to serving Army soldiers within certain formations still in Britain, and from men of the disbanding divisional Independent Companies originally raised from Territorial Army (TA) divisions who had served in the Norwegian campaign. (Note: The 10 independent companies were raised from volunteers in 2nd Line Territorial Army divisions in April 1940. They were intended for guerrilla style operations in Norway following Operation Weserübung, the German invasion of Denmark and Norway. Each of the 10 companies initially consisted of 21 officers and 268 soldiers.)

By the autumn of 1940 more than 2,000 men had volunteered and in November 1940 these new units were organised into a Special Service Brigade consisting of four battalions under the command of Brigadier Joseph Charles Haydon. The Special Service Brigade was quickly expanded to 12 units which became known as Commandos. Each Commando had a lieutenant-colonel as the commanding officer and numbered around 450 men (divided into 75-man troops that were further divided into 15-man sections). Technically these men were only on secondment to the Commandos; they retained their own regimental cap badges and remained on the regimental roll for pay. The Commando force came under the operational control of the Combined Operations Headquarters. The man initially selected as the commander of Combined Operations was Admiral Roger Keyes, a veteran of the Gallipoli campaign and the Zeebrugge Raid in the First World War. Keyes resigned in October 1941 and was replaced by Vice Admiral Lord Louis Mountbatten. Major-General Robert Laycock was the last Commander of Combined Operations; he took over from Mountbatten in October 1943.

== Organisation ==
=== Commando units ===
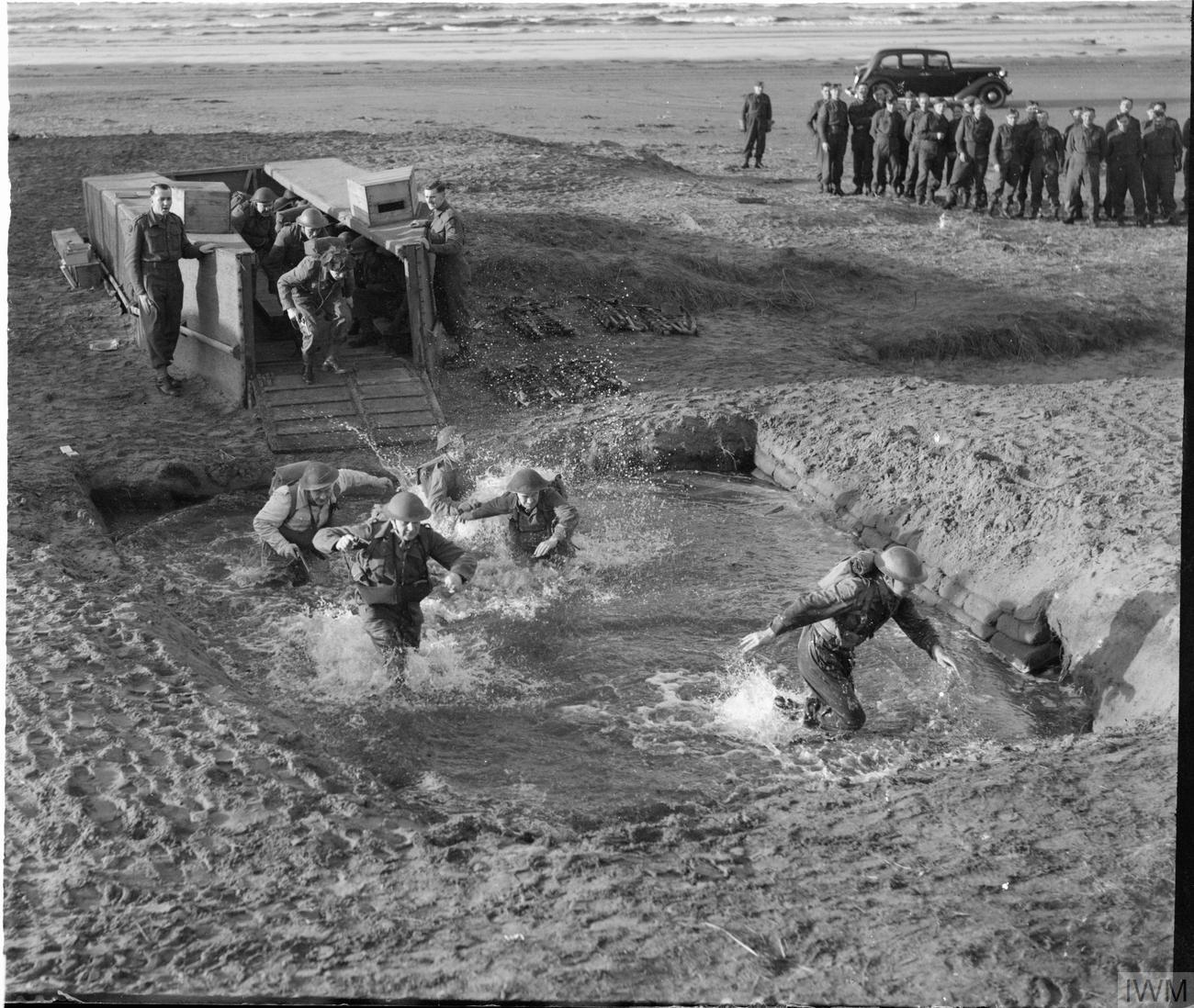
Commandos simulate an amphibious landing by disembarking from a dummy landing craft into a shallow pit filled with water.

The Commando units formed in the United Kingdom were: No. 1, No. 2, No. 3, No. 4, No. 5, No. 6, No. 7, No. 8 (Guards), No. 9, No. 10 (Inter-Allied), No. 11 (Scottish), No. 12, No. 14 (Arctic), No. 30, and No. 62 Commando. At the same time four Commando units were formed in the Middle East: No. 50, No. 51, No. 52, and the Middle East Commando. The No. 10 (Inter-Allied) Commando was formed from volunteers from the occupied territories and enemy aliens. It was the largest Commando unit formed, and contained troops from France, Belgium, Poland, Norway, the Netherlands, and No. 3 (X) Troop. The No. 3 (X) Troop consisted of enemy aliens; it was also known as the English, Jewish, or British troop and was officially renamed the Miscellaneous Troop in 1944. Most of the troop had German, Austrian, or Eastern European backgrounds, while others were political or religious refugees from Nazi Germany.

Some Commandos were designated for different tasks from the start. No. 2 Commando was always intended to be a parachute unit. In June 1940 they began parachute training and were re-designated the 11th Special Air Service (SAS) Battalion, which eventually became the 1st Parachute Battalion. After their re-designation a new No. 2 Commando was formed. Other Commandos were grouped together in a larger formation known as Layforce and sent to the Middle East. The Special Air Service and the Special Boat Squadron were formed from the survivors of Layforce. The men of No. 14 (Arctic) Commando were specially trained for operations in the Arctic Circle and specialised in using small boats and canoes to attack shipping. The joint service unit No. 30 Commando was formed for intelligence gathering. Its members were trained in the recognition of enemy documents, search techniques, safe cracking, prisoner handling, photography, and escape techniques. No. 62 Commando or the Small Scale Raiding Force was a small 55–man unit under the operational control of the Special Operations Executive (SOE). They carried out raids planned by SOE such as Operation Postmaster on the Spanish island of Fernando Po off the coast of West Africa.

In February 1941 the Commandos were reorganized in accordance with a new war establishment. Each Commando unit now consisted of a Headquarters and six troops (instead of the previous 10). Each troop would comprise three officers and 62 other ranks; this number was set so each troop would fit into two Assault Landing Craft. The new formation also meant that two complete Commando units could be carried in the 'Glen' type landing ship and one unit in the 'Dutch' type landing ship. The motor transport issued to each commando consisted of one car for the commanding officer, 12 motorcycles (six with sidecars), two 15 hundredweight (cwt) trucks, and one 3-ton truck. These vehicles were only provided for administration and training and were not intended to accompany the men on operations.

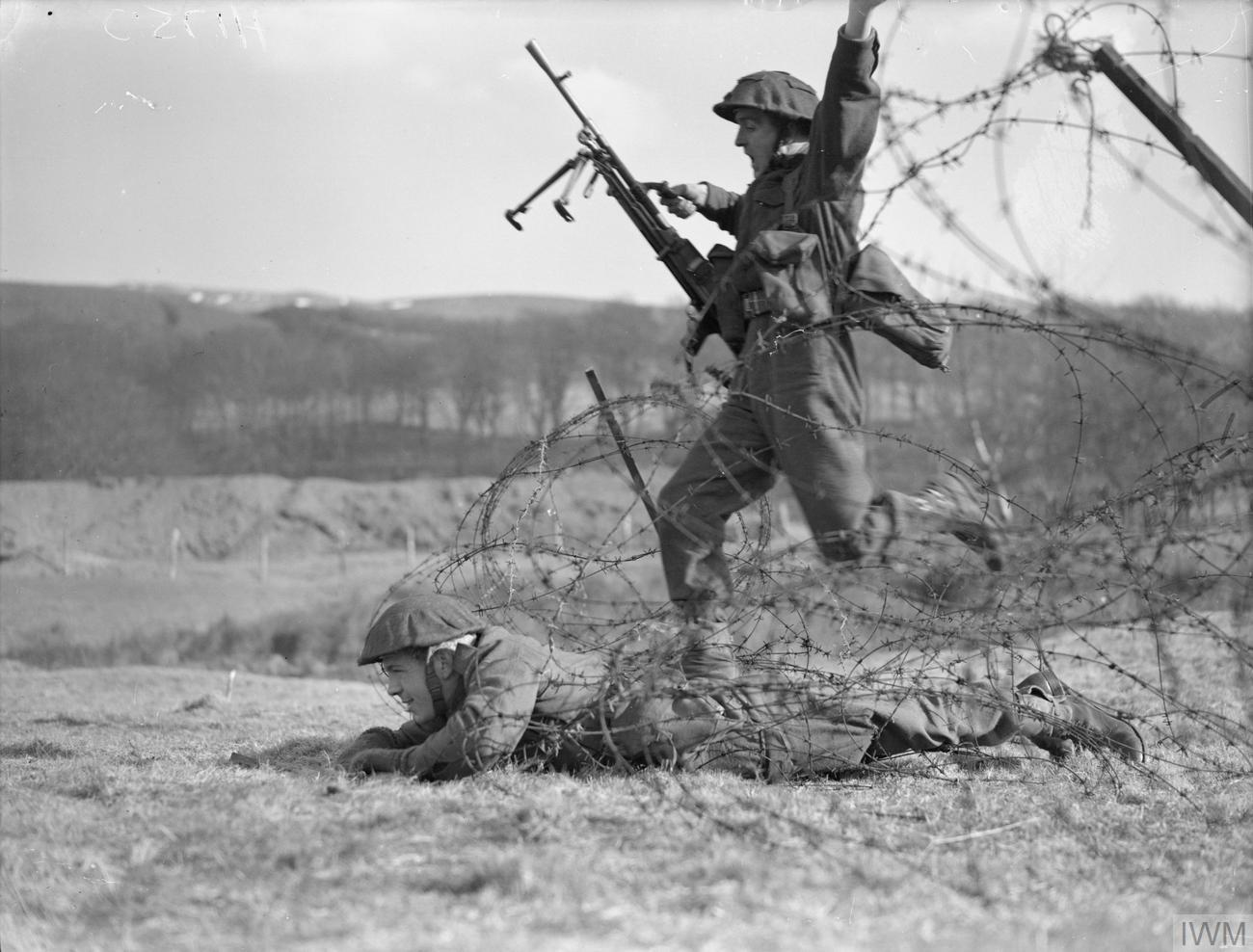
Commandos demonstrate a technique for crossing barbed wire during training in Scotland, 28 February 1942.

In February 1942 the Royal Marines were tasked to organise Commando units of their own. In total nine Commando units were formed by the Royal Marines: No. 40, No. 41, No. 42, No. 43, No. 44, No. 45, No. 46, No. 47 and the last, No. 48, which was not formed until 1944. In 1943 two other Commando units were formed. The first was the Royal Naval Commandos, who were established to carry out tasks associated with establishing, maintaining, and controlling beachheads during amphibious operations. The other was the Royal Air Force Commandos, who would accompany an invasion force either to make enemy airfields serviceable, or to make new airstrips operational and contribute to their defence.

=== 1943 reorganization ===
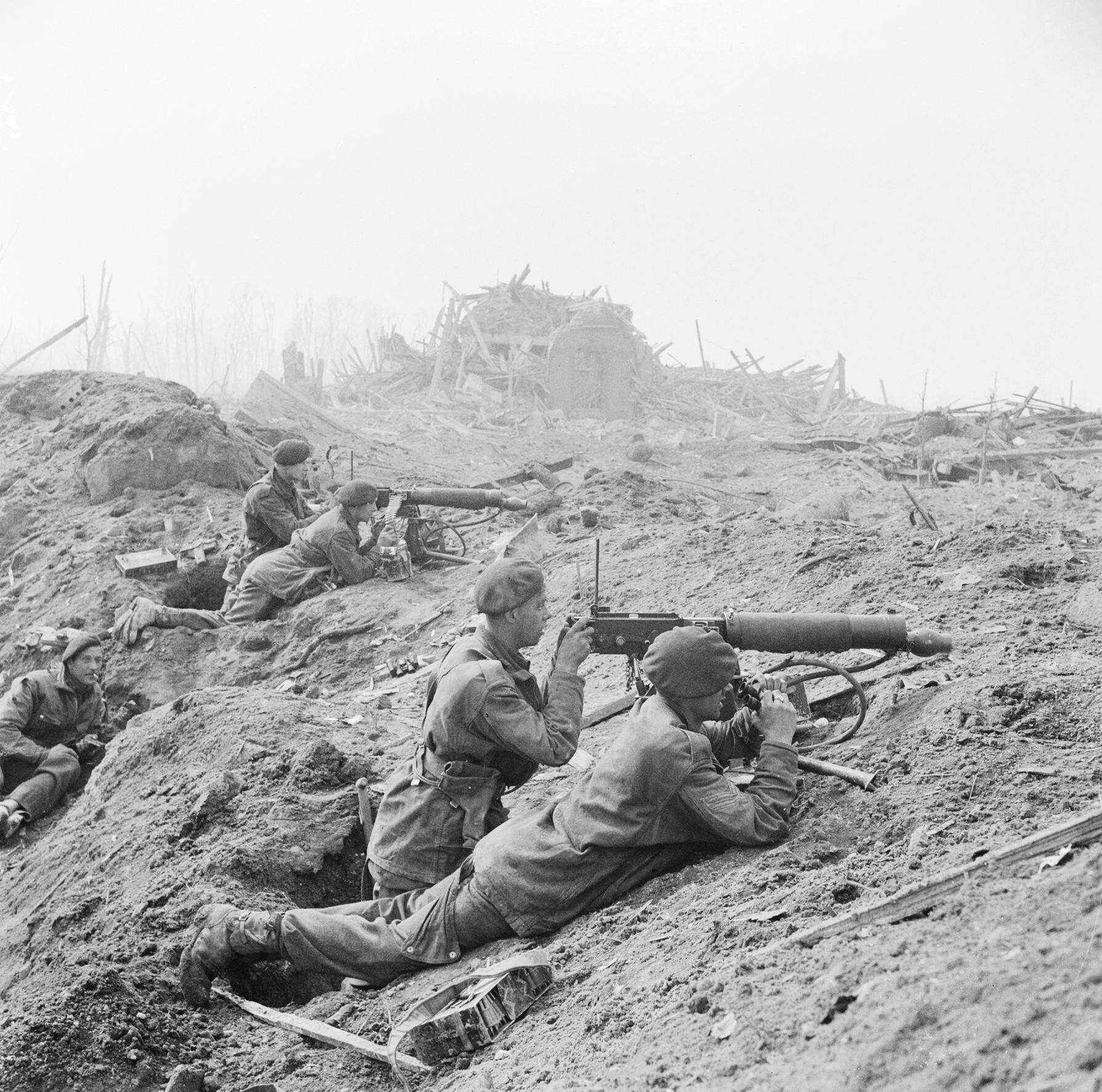
Two Vickers machine guns of a heavy weapons troop in the outskirts of Wesel, 1945

In 1943, the formation of the Commando unit was changed. Each Commando now consisted of a small headquarters group, five fighting troops, a heavy weapons troop, and a signals platoon. The fighting troops consisted of 65 men of all ranks divided into two 30–man sections which were subdivided into three 10–man subsections. The heavy weapons troop was made up of 3-inch mortar and Vickers machine gun teams. The Commandos were provided with the motor transport needed to accompany them on operations. Their transport now consisted of the commanding officer's car, 15 motorcycles (six with side cars), ten 15 cwt trucks, and three 3-ton trucks. The heavy weapons troop had seven Jeeps and trailers and one Jeep for each of the fighting troops and the headquarters. This gave them enough vehicles of their own to accommodate two fighting troops, the heavy weapons troop, and the Commando Headquarters.

By now the Commandos started to move away from smaller raiding operations. They were formed into four brigades to spearhead future Allied landing operations. The previous Special Service Brigade Headquarters was replaced by Headquarters Special Services Group under command of Major-General Robert Sturges. Of the remaining 20 Commando units, 17 were used in the formation of the four Special Service brigades. The three remaining Commandos (Nos. 12, 14, and 62) were left out of the brigade structure to concentrate on smaller scale raids. The increased tempo of operations, together with a shortage of volunteers and the need to provide replacements for casualties, forced their disbandment by the end of 1943. The small scale raiding role was then given to the two French troops of No. 10 (Inter-Allied) Commando.

From 1944 the Operational Holding Commando Headquarters was formed. It was responsible for two sub-units: the Army and Royal Marines Holding Commando Wings. Both units had an establishment of five troops and a heavy weapons troop of fully trained commandos. The men in these troops were to provide individual or complete troop replacements for the Commando units in the field. In December 1944, the four Special Service brigades were re-designated as Commando brigades.

== Training ==
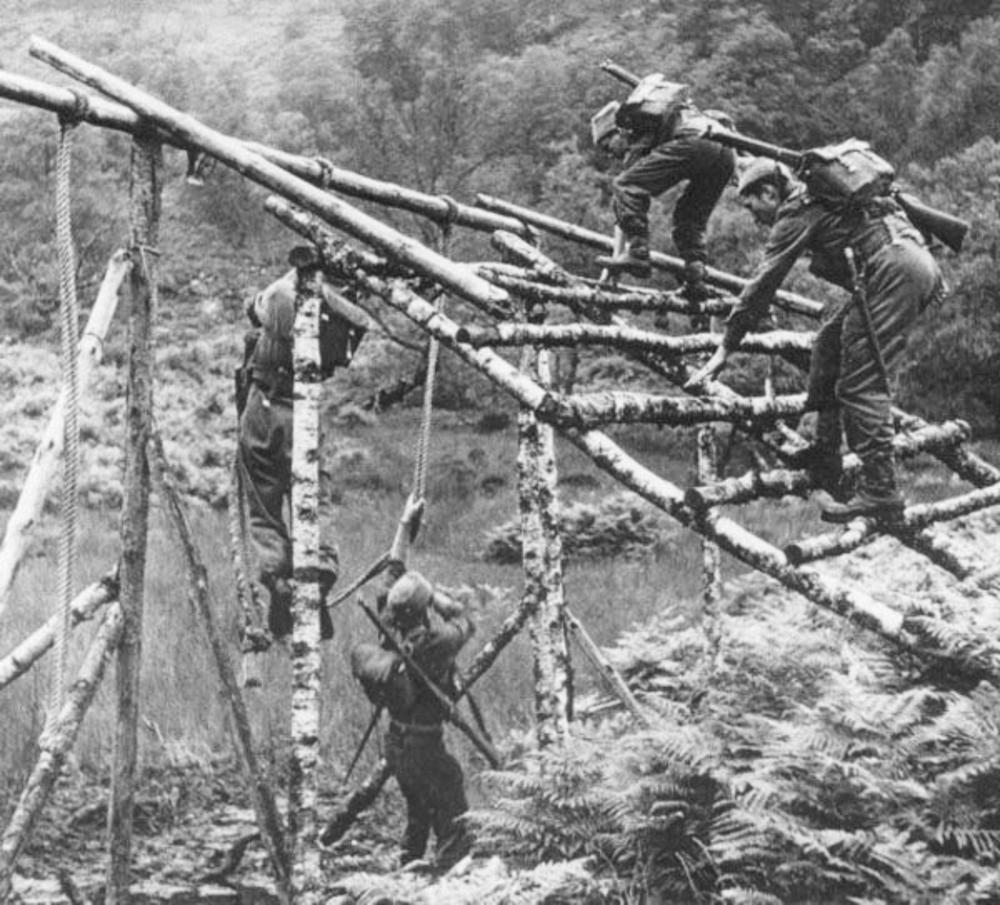
Negotiating an assault course obstacle

When the Commando units were originally formed in 1940, training was the responsibility of the unit commanding officers. Training was hampered by the general shortage of equipment throughout the British Army at this time, as most arms and equipment had been left behind at Dunkirk. In December 1940 a Middle East Commando depot was formed with the responsibility of training and supplying reinforcements for the Commando units in that theatre. In February 1942 the Commando training depot at Achnacarry in the Scottish Highlands was established by Brigadier Charles Haydon under the command of Lieutenant-Colonel Charles Vaughan, the Commando depot was responsible for training complete units and individual replacements. The training regime was for the time innovative and physically demanding, and far in advance of normal British Army training. The depot staff were all hand picked, with the ability to outperform any of the volunteers. Training and assessment started immediately on arrival, with the volunteers having to complete an 8-mile (13 km) march with all their equipment from the Spean Bridge railway station to the commando depot. When they arrived they were met by Vaughan, who stressed the physical demands of the course and that any man who failed to live up to the requirements would be 'returned to unit' (RTU).

Exercises were conducted using live ammunition and explosives to make training as realistic as possible. Physical fitness was a prerequisite, with cross country runs and boxing matches to improve fitness. Speed and endurance marches were conducted up and down the nearby mountain ranges and over assault courses that included a zip-line over Loch Arkaig, all while carrying arms and full equipment. Training continued by day and night with river crossings, mountain climbing, weapons training, unarmed combat, map reading, and small boat operations on the syllabus. Living conditions were primitive in the camp, with trainees housed either under canvas in tents or in Nissen huts and they were responsible for cooking their own meals. Correct military protocols were enforced: Officers were saluted and uniforms had to be clean, with brasses and boots shining on parade. At the end of each course the final exercise was a simulated night beach landing using live ammunition.

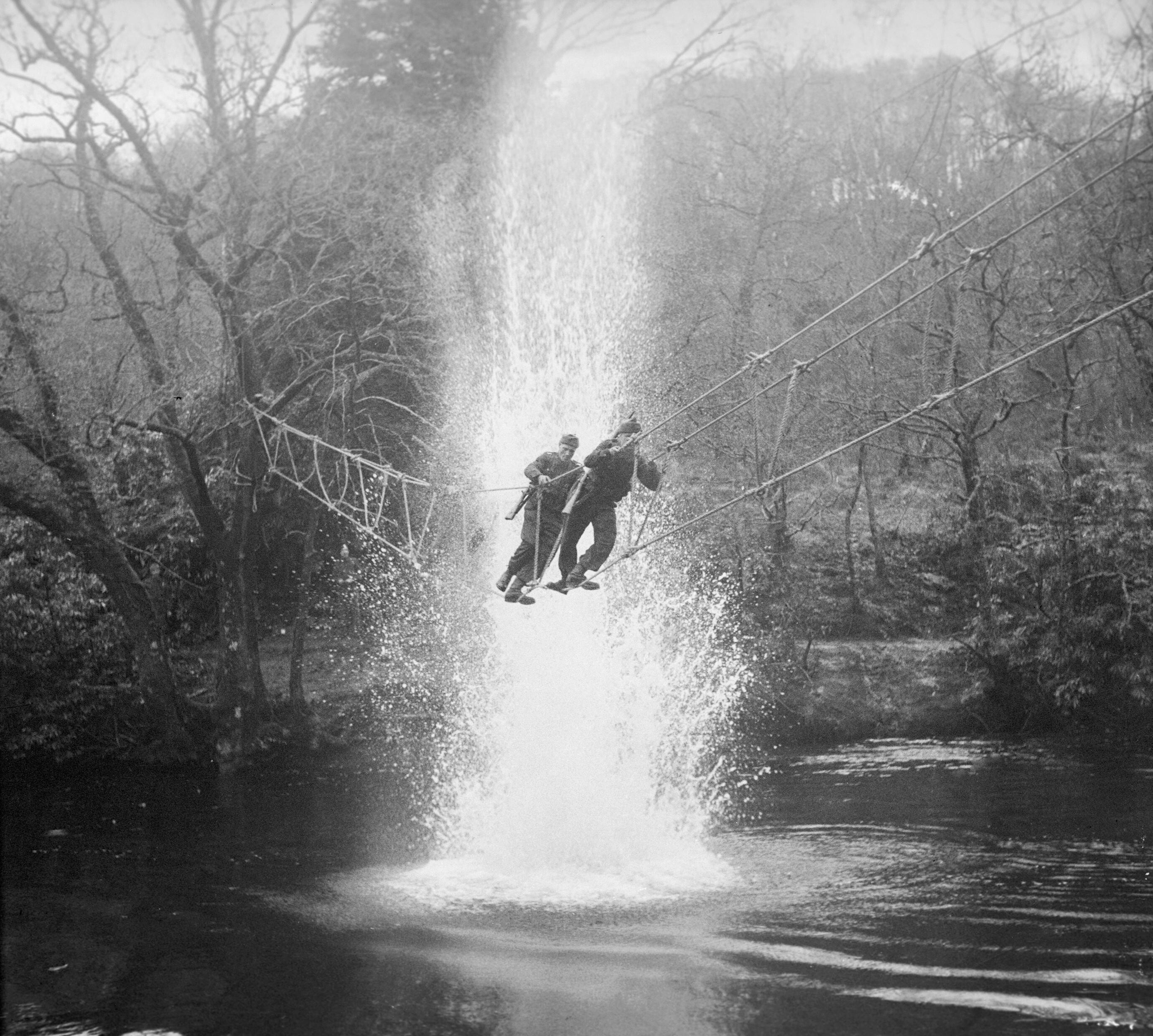
Crossing a river on a toggle rope bridge under simulated artillery fire

Another smaller Commando depot, known as the Commando Mountain and Snow Warfare training camp, was established at Braemar. This camp was run by two famous mountaineers: the depot commander Squadron Leader Frank Smythe and chief instructor Major John Hunt. The depot provided training for operations in Arctic conditions, with instruction in climbing snow-covered mountains, cliff climbing, and small boat and canoe handling. Training was conducted in how to live, fight, and move on foot or on skis in snowy conditions.

A major change in the training programme occurred in 1943. From that point on training concentrated more on the assault infantry role and less on raiding operations. Training now included how to call for fire support from artillery and naval gunfire, and how to obtain tactical air support from the Allied air forces. More emphasis was put on joint training, with two or more Commando units working together in brigades. By the end of the war 25,000 men had passed through the Commando course at Achnacarry. This total includes not only the British volunteers, but volunteers from Belgium, France, Netherlands, Norway, Poland, and the United States Army Rangers, which were modelled on the Commandos.

=== Weapons and equipment ===
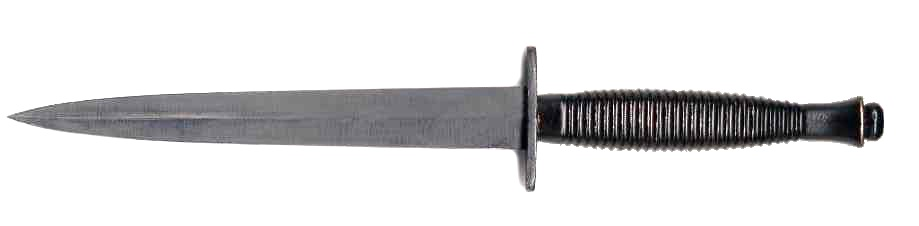
Fairbairn–Sykes fighting knife

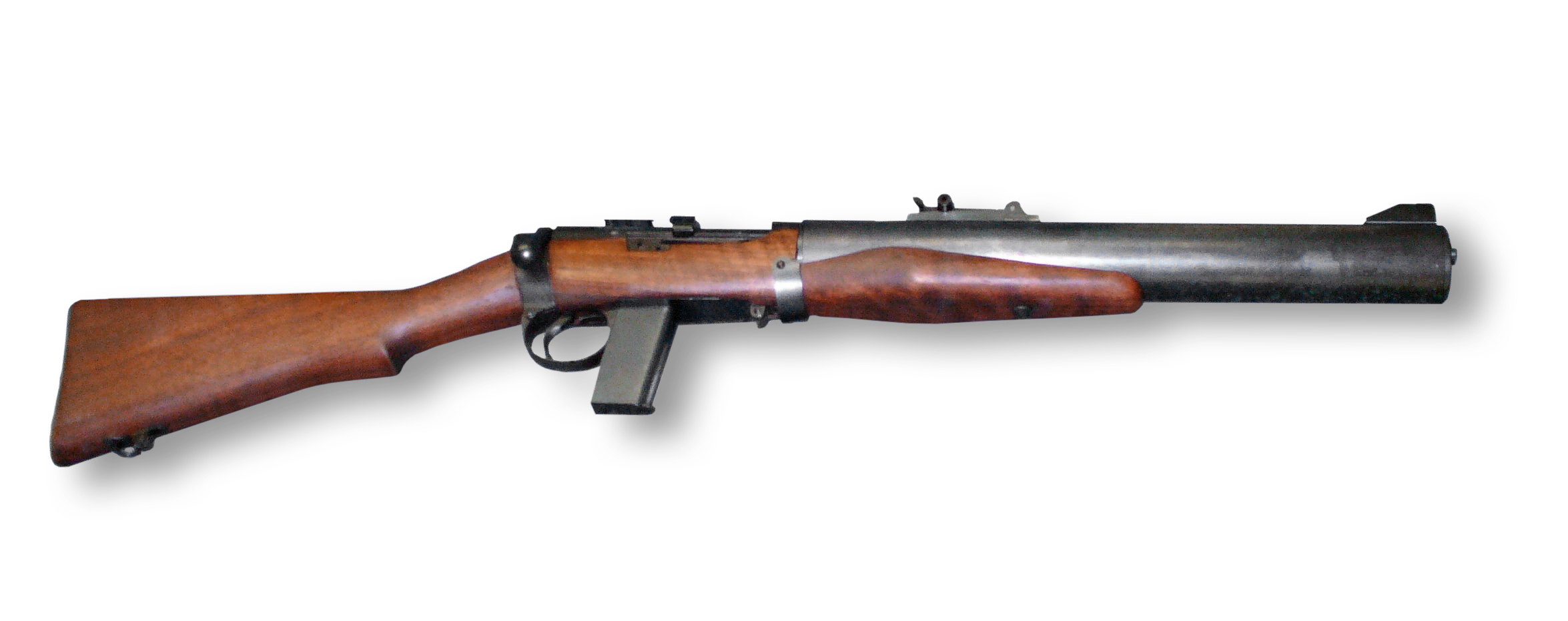
De Lisle carbine

As a raiding force, the Commandos were not issued the heavy weapons of a normal infantry battalion. The weapons used were the standard British Army small arms of the time; most riflemen carried the Lee–Enfield rifle and section fire support was provided by the Bren light machine gun. The Thompson was the submachine gun of choice, but later in the war the Commandos also used the cheaper and lighter Sten gun. Commando sections were equipped with a higher number of Bren and Thompson guns than a normal British infantry section. The Webley Revolver was initially used as the standard sidearm, but it was eventually replaced by the Colt 45 pistol, which used the same ammunition as the Thompson submachine gun.

Another pistol was the Browning Hi-Power chambered in 9 mm Parabellum by the Canadian manufacturer John Inglis and Company. One weapon specifically designed for the Commandos was the De Lisle carbine. Modelled on the Lee–Enfield rifle and fitted with a silencer, it used the same .45 cartridge as the Thompson and was designed to eliminate sentries during Commando raids. Some were used and proved successful on operations, but the nature of the Commando role had changed before they were put into full production, and the order for their purchase was cancelled. The Fairbairn–Sykes fighting knife was designed especially for Commandos' use in hand-to-hand combat, replacing the BC-41 knuckleduster/dagger, although a whole range of clubs and knives were used in the field. Some of the heavier and crew–served weapons used included the Boys anti-tank rifle and the two-inch mortar for indirect fire support. After 1943, the Projector, Infantry, Anti Tank, known as the PIAT, replaced the now obsolete Boys anti-tank rifle. With the formation of the heavy weapons troops, Commandos were issued the 3-inch mortar and the Vickers machine gun. The issue of the medium Vickers machine gun to Commando units set them apart from typical British Army infantry divisions, who tended to only employ the weapon in specialist machine gun battalions.

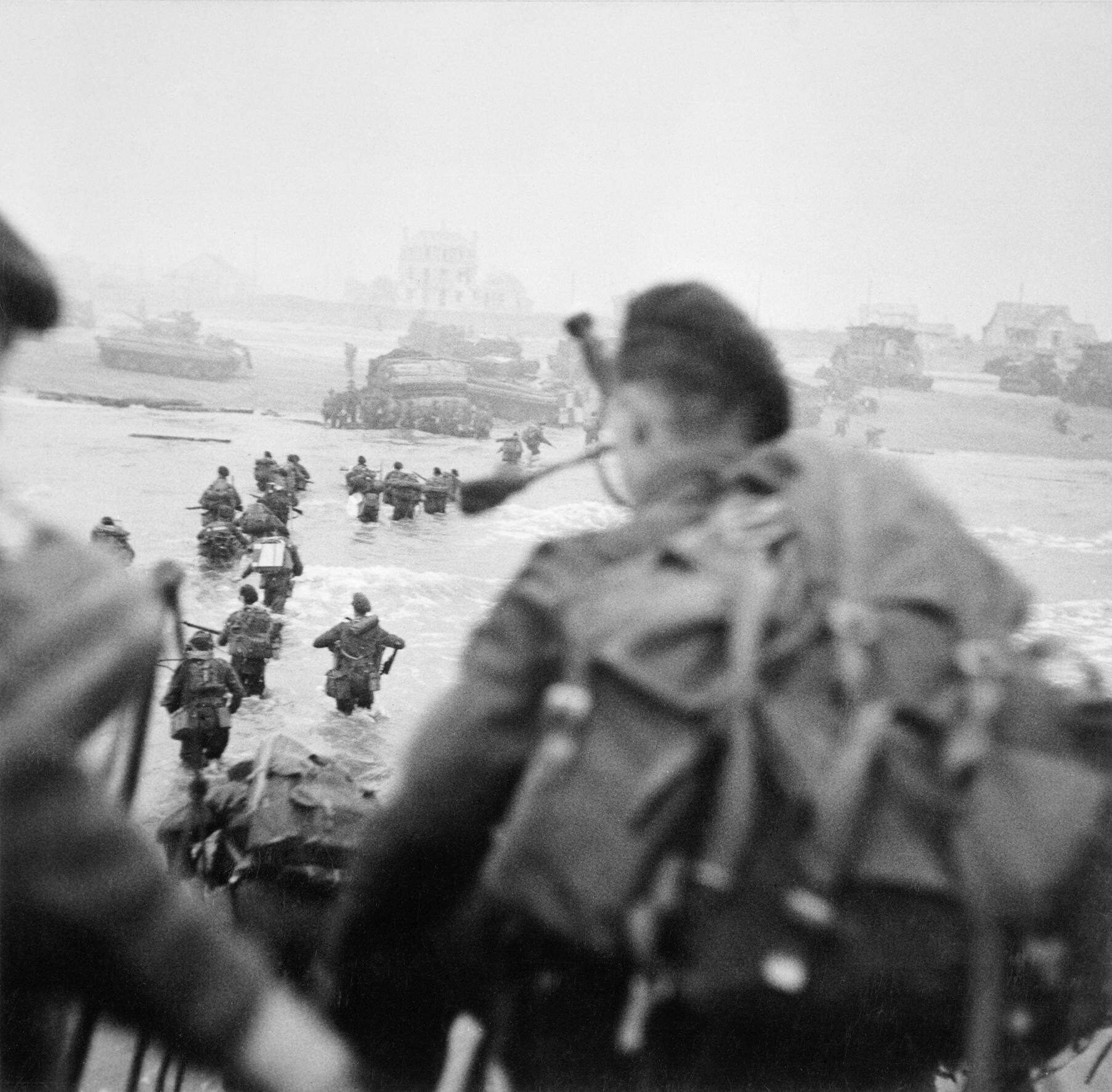
Commandos wearing the green beret and carrying the Bergan rucksack during the Normandy landings

Initially the Commandos were indistinguishable from the rest of the British Army and volunteers retained their own regimental head-dress and insignia. No. 2 Commando adopted Scottish head-dress for all ranks and No. 11 (Scottish) Commando wore the Tam O'Shanter with a black hackle. The official head-dress of the Middle East Commandos was a bush hat with their own knuckleduster cap badge. This badge was modelled on their issue fighting knife (the Mark I trench knife) which had a knuckleduster for a handle. In 1942 the green Commando beret and the Combined Operations tactical recognition flash were adopted.

As the men were equipped for raiding operations and only lightly armed, they did not carry anti-gas protective equipment or large packs, and the standard British steel helmet was replaced by a woollen cap comforter. Instead of heavy ammunition boots they wore lightweight rubber soled gym shoes that allowed them to move silently. All ranks carried a toggle rope, several of which could be linked together to form longer ropes for scaling cliffs or other obstacles. During boat operations an inflatable lifebelt was worn for safety. The Commandos were the first unit to adopt the Bergan rucksack to carry heavy loads of ammunition, explosives, and other demolition equipment. A battle jerkin was produced to wear over battledress and the airborne forces' camouflaged Denison smock became standard issue for Commando forces later in the war.

== Operations ==
The very first Commando raid – Operation Collar on 23 June 1940 – was not actually carried out by a Commando unit, but by one of their predecessors: No.11 Independent Company. The mission, led by Major Ronnie Tod, was an offensive reconnaissance carried out on the French coast south of Boulogne-sur-Mer and Le Touquet. The operation was a limited success; at least two German soldiers were killed whilst the only British injury was a flesh wound suffered by Lieutenant-Colonel Dudley Clarke, who had accompanied the raiders as an observer. A second and similarly inconsequential raid, Operation Ambassador, was made on the German-occupied island of Guernsey on the night of 14 July 1940 by men from H Troop of No. 3 Commando and No. 11 Independent Company. One unit landed on the wrong island and another group disembarked from its launch into water so deep that it came over their heads. Intelligence had indicated that there was a large German barracks on the island but the Commandos found only empty buildings. When they returned to the beach heavy seas had forced their launch offshore, and they were forced to swim out to sea to be picked up.

The size of the raiding force depended on the objective. The smallest raid was conducted by two men from No. 6 Commando in Operation J V. The largest was the 10,500 man Operation Jubilee. Most of the raids were scheduled to only last overnight although some, like Operation Gauntlet, were conducted over a number of days. In north west Europe 57 raids were made between 1940 and 1944. Of these 36 were against targets in France. There were 12 raids against Norway, seven raids in the Channel Islands, and single raids were made in Belgium and the Netherlands. The success of the raids varied; Operation Chariot, the raid against dock installations at St Nazaire, has been hailed as the greatest raid of all time, but others, like Operation Aquatint, resulted in the capture or death of all involved. The smaller raids ended in mid-1944 on the orders of Major-General Robert Laycock, who suggested that they were no longer as effective and only resulted in the Germans strengthening their beach defences, something that could be extremely detrimental to Allied plans.

=== Norway ===
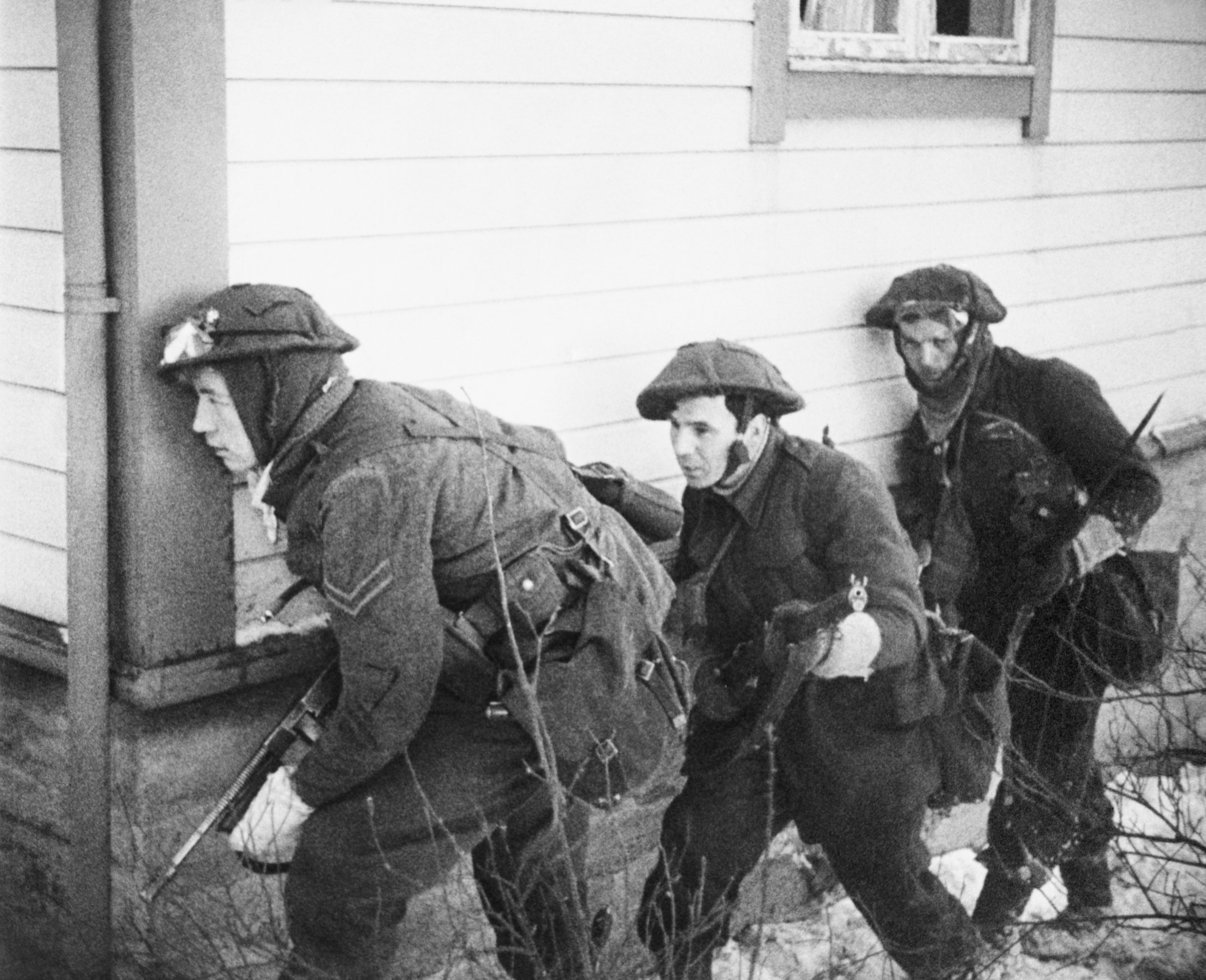
Commandos during Operation Archery – the man on the left is armed with a Thompson submachine gun

The first Commando raid in Norway, Operation Claymore, was conducted in March 1941 by men of Nos. 3 and 4 Commandos. This was the first large scale raid from the United Kingdom during the war. Their objective was the undefended Norwegian Lofoten Islands. They successfully destroyed the fish-oil factories, petrol dumps, and 11 ships, while capturing 216 Germans, encryption equipment, and codebooks.

In December 1941 there were two raids. The first was Operation Anklet, a raid on the Lofoten Islands by No. 12 Commando on 26 December. The German garrison was in the midst of their Christmas celebrations and was easily overcome; the Commandos re-embarked after two days. Operation Archery was a larger raid at Vågsøy Island. This raid involved men from Nos. 2, 3, 4 and 6 Commandos, a Royal Navy flotilla, and limited air support. The raid caused significant damage to factories, warehouses, and the German garrison, and sank eight ships. After this the Germans increased the garrison in Norway by an extra 30,000 troops, upgraded coastal and inland defences, and sent a number of capital ships to the area.

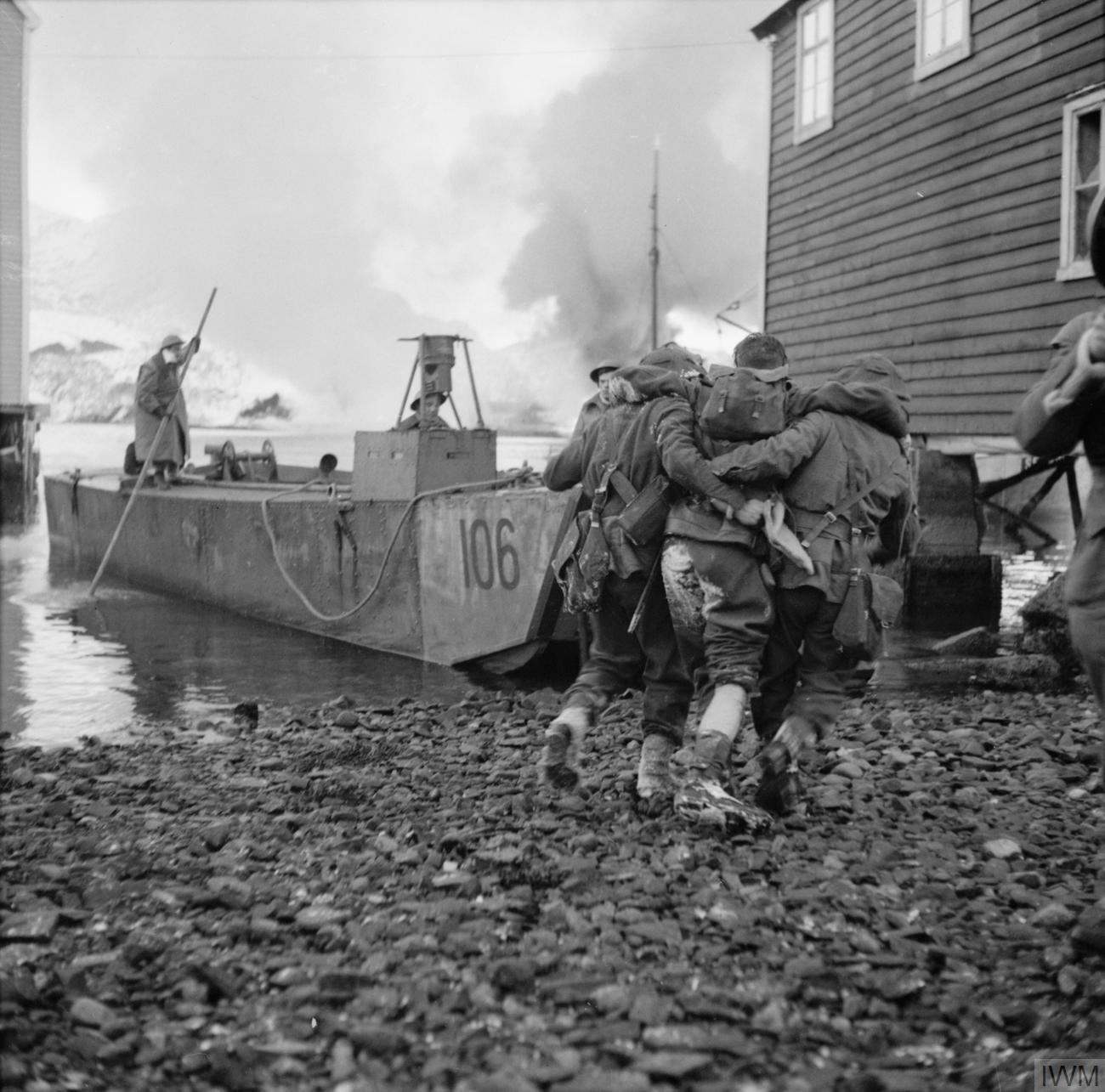
A wounded Commando being helped towards a Landing Craft Assault (LCA) during Operation Archery

In September 1942 men from No. 2 Commando took part in Operation Musketoon, a raid against the Glomfjord hydroelectric power plant. The Commandos were landed by submarine and succeeded in blowing up some pipelines, turbines, and tunnels. This effectively destroyed the generating station and the aluminium plant was shut down permanently. One Commando was killed in the raid and another seven were captured while trying to escape. They spent a short time at Colditz Castle before being transferred to Sachsenhausen concentration camp. Shortly after their arrival at Sachsenhausen they were executed. They were the first victims of the secret Commando Order, which mandated the execution of all captured Commandos. The three remaining Commandos managed to reach Sweden and were eventually returned to No. 2 Commando.

In 1943, the Norwegian Troop of No. 10 (Inter-Allied), No. 12, and No. 14 (Arctic) Commandos assisted the Royal Navy in carrying out anti-shipping raids in Norwegian coastal waters. The Commandos provided extra firepower for the navy Motor Torpedo Boats when they were at sea and acted as a guard force when they were at anchor in the Norwegian fjords. In April 1943, seven men of No. 14 (Arctic) Commando took part in a raid on German shipping near Haugesund code named Operation Checkmate. They managed to sink several ships using limpet mines, but were captured and eventually taken to Sachsenhausen and Bergen-Belsen concentration camps, where they were executed.

Elements of No. 12 Commando and No. 14 Commando were formed into 'Northforce' at various times in 1943 and 1944 for raids and reconnaissance of the Norwegian coastline.

The Germans responded to the numerous raids directed at Norway by increasing the number of troops stationed there. By 1944 the garrison had risen to 370,000 men. In comparison, a British infantry division in 1944 had an establishment of 18,347 men.

=== Channel Islands ===
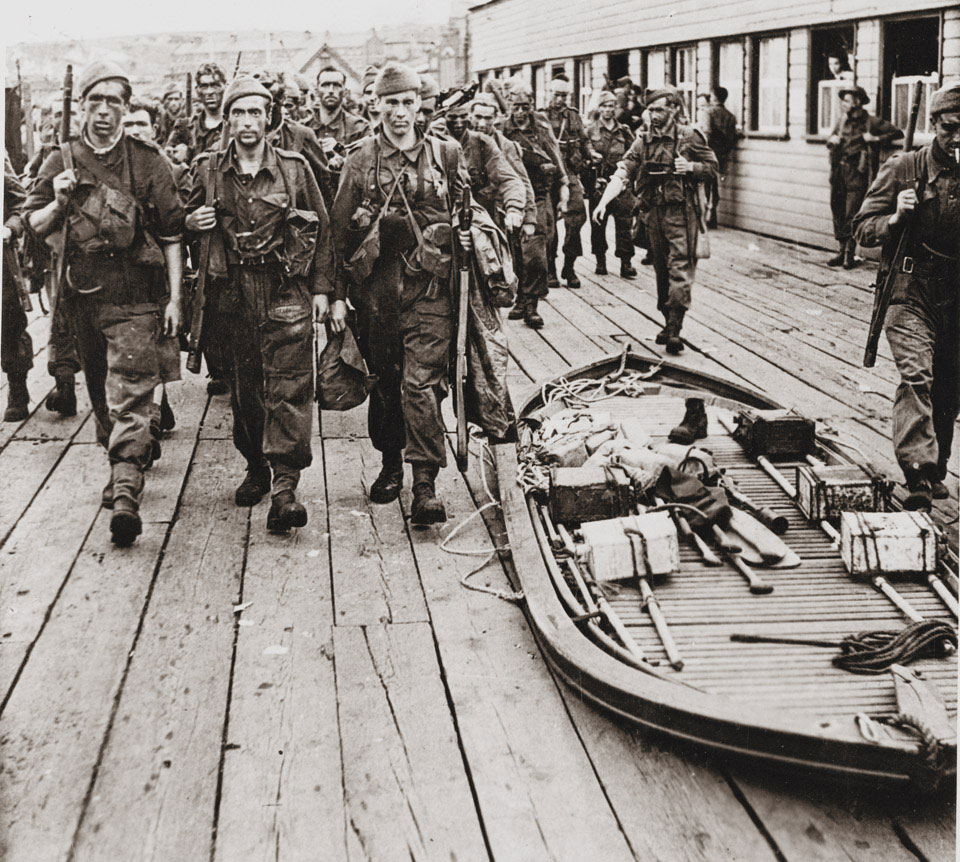
Commandos marching past a collapsed Goatley boat, which was used in smaller raids to transfer from motor boats to the shore

Seven Commando missions were carried out on the Channel Islands. Operation Ambassador, which focused on Guernsey, was the first and largest of these, employing 140 men from No. 3 Commando and No. 11 Independent Company in a night raid on 14 July 1940. Later raids were much smaller; only 12 men of No. 62 Commando took part in Operation Dryad in September 1942, when they captured seven prisoners and located several German codebooks. Operation Branford, a reconnaissance mission that aimed to identify a suitable gun position to support future raids on Alderney, followed only days later. In October of that year 12 men from No.s 12 and 62 Commandos took part in Operation Basalt, a raid on Sark that saw four Germans killed and one taken prisoner.

All the other Channel Islands raids were less successful. In January 1943, Operation Huckabuck, a raid on Herm, was a failure. After three attempts to scale the islands cliffs the Commandos finally reached the top, but there were no signs of any German occupation troops or of the island's population. The next raids were Operations Hardtack 28 and Hardtack 7 in December 1943. The Hardtack 28 raid on Jersey ended in failure when two men were killed and one wounded after they walked into a minefield. The exploding mines alerted the German garrison and the Commandos had to abandon the operation. In Hardtack 7 the Commandos had returned to Sark, but had to abandon the operation and return to England when they were unable to scale the island's cliffs.

=== Mediterranean ===
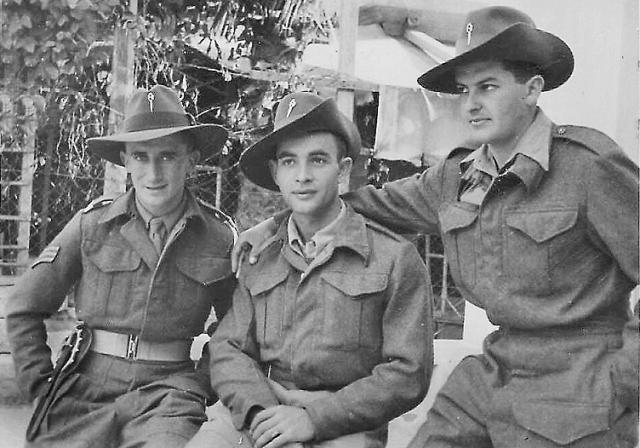
Men from No. 51 Commando wearing bush hats with the Middle East knuckleduster type Commando cap badge, modelled on the Mark I trench knife on the sergeant's belt

During 1941, the Middle East Commandos and Layforce were tasked to carry out a campaign of harassment and dislocation against enemy forces in the Mediterranean. At the time that Layforce was raised, the British had the ascendency in the theatre, as they had largely defeated the Italians. It was felt that the Commandos could be employed in the capture of the island of Rhodes. However, the arrival of the Afrika Korps in Cyrenaica and the invasion of Yugoslavia and Greece greatly changed the strategic outlook. By the time Layforce arrived in Egypt in March the situation had become dire. The deployment of forces to Greece meant that the Commandos became the only troops in general reserve. As the strategic situation worsened, it became increasingly difficult to employ them in the manner intended, as they were called upon as reinforcements to the rest of the army.

In May 1941 the majority of Layforce were sent as reinforcements to the Battle of Crete. Almost as soon as they landed it was decided that they could not be employed in an offensive role and would instead be used to cover the withdrawal route towards the south. They were ill-equipped for this type of operation, as they were lacking in indirect fire support weapons such as mortars or artillery; they were armed mainly with rifles and a few Bren light machine guns. By 31 May the evacuation was drawing to a close and the commandos, running low on ammunition, rations, and water, fell back towards Sphakia. In the end, the vast majority of the commandos were left behind on the island, becoming prisoners of war. About 600 of the 800 commandos that had been sent to Crete were listed as killed, missing, or wounded; only 179 commandos managed to get off the island. In April 1941 men from No. 7 Commando took part in the Bardia raid, but by late July 1941 Layforce had been severely reduced in strength. Reinforcements were unlikely given the circumstances. The operational difficulties that had been exposed during the Bardia raid, combined with the inability of the high command to fully embrace the Commando concept, had largely served to make the force ineffective. The decision was made to disband Layforce.

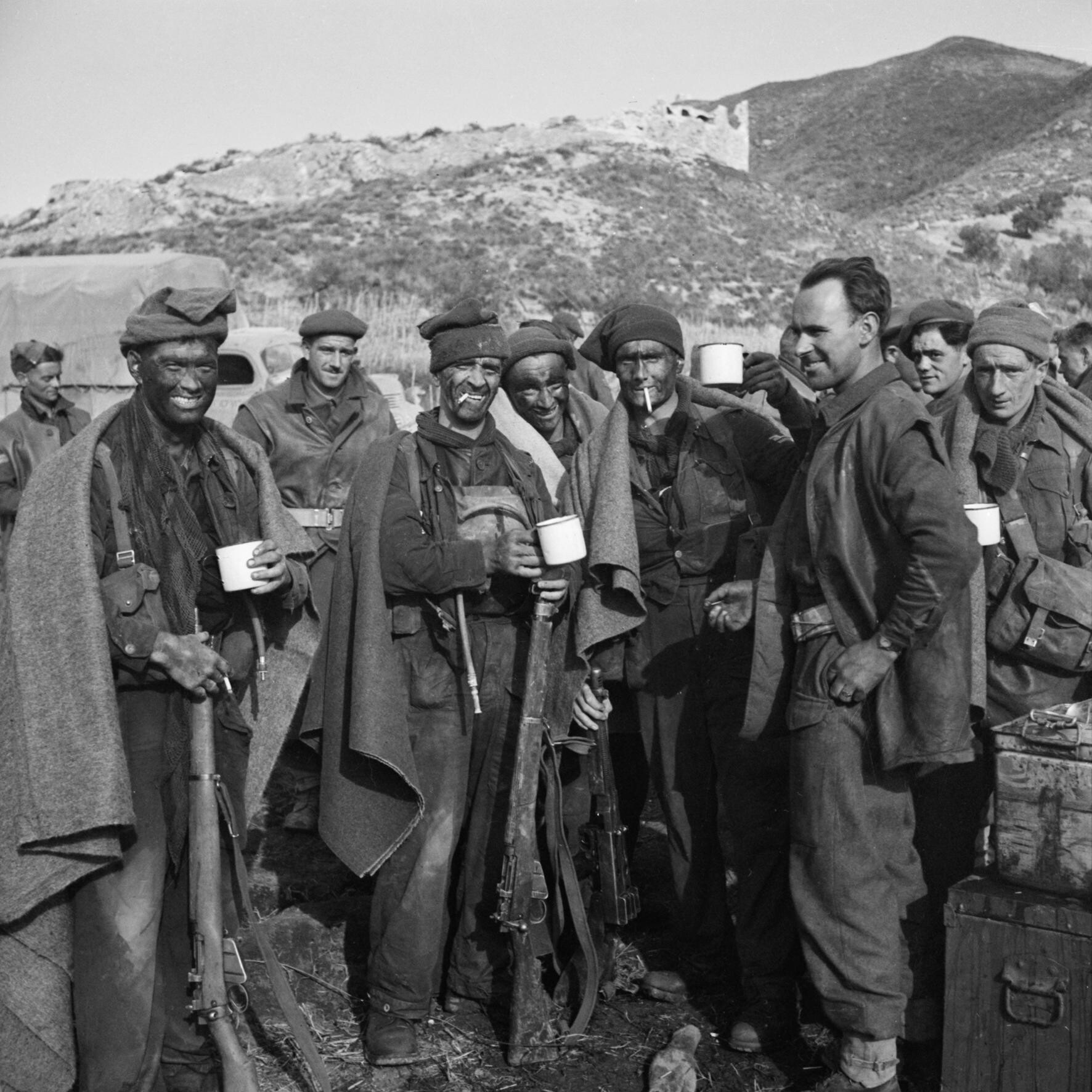
Men from No. 9 Commando the morning after Operation Partridge near the Garigliano river, 30 December 1943

In November 1942, No. 1 and No. 6 Commandos formed part of the spearhead for Allied landings in Algeria as part of Operation Torch. Tensions were high between the British and the Vichy French at this time because of a number of clashes like the Attack on Mers-el-Kébir. As a result, the decision was made for the Commandos to be equipped with American weapons and uniforms in an effort to placate the defenders. The Tunisia Campaign followed the Torch landings. No. 1 and No. 6 Commandos were involved in the first battle of Sedjenane between February and March 1943. Both Commando units remained in theatre until April, when the decision was made to withdraw them from the fighting in North Africa. Lacking the administrative support and reinforcements of regular infantry units, the strength of the two units had fallen and they were no longer considered effective.

In May 1943 a Special Service Brigade comprising No. 2, No. 3, No. 40 (RM), and No. 41 (RM) Commandos was sent to the Mediterranean to take part in the Allied invasion of Sicily. The two Royal Marines Commandos were the first into action, landing ahead of the main force. The 2nd Special Service Brigade serving in the Italian campaign was joined in November 1943 by the Belgian and Polish Troops of No. 10 (Inter-Allied) Commando. The Polish troop captured a German-occupied village on its own when the 2/6th Battalion Queen's Regiment failed to reach a rendezvous on time. On 2 April 1945 the whole of the now named 2nd Commando Brigade were engaged in Operation Roast at Comacchio lagoon in north east Italy. This was the first major action of the big spring offensive to push the Germans back across the River Po and out of Italy. After a fierce three-day battle the Commandos succeeded in clearing the spit separating the lagoon from the Adriatic and secured the flank of the 8th Army. This fostered the idea that the main offensive would be along the coast and not though the Argenta Gap. Major Anders Lassen (Special Air Service) and Corporal Thomas Peck Hunter No. 43 (Royal Marine) Commando were each awarded a posthumous Victoria Cross for their actions during Operation Roast.

=== France ===
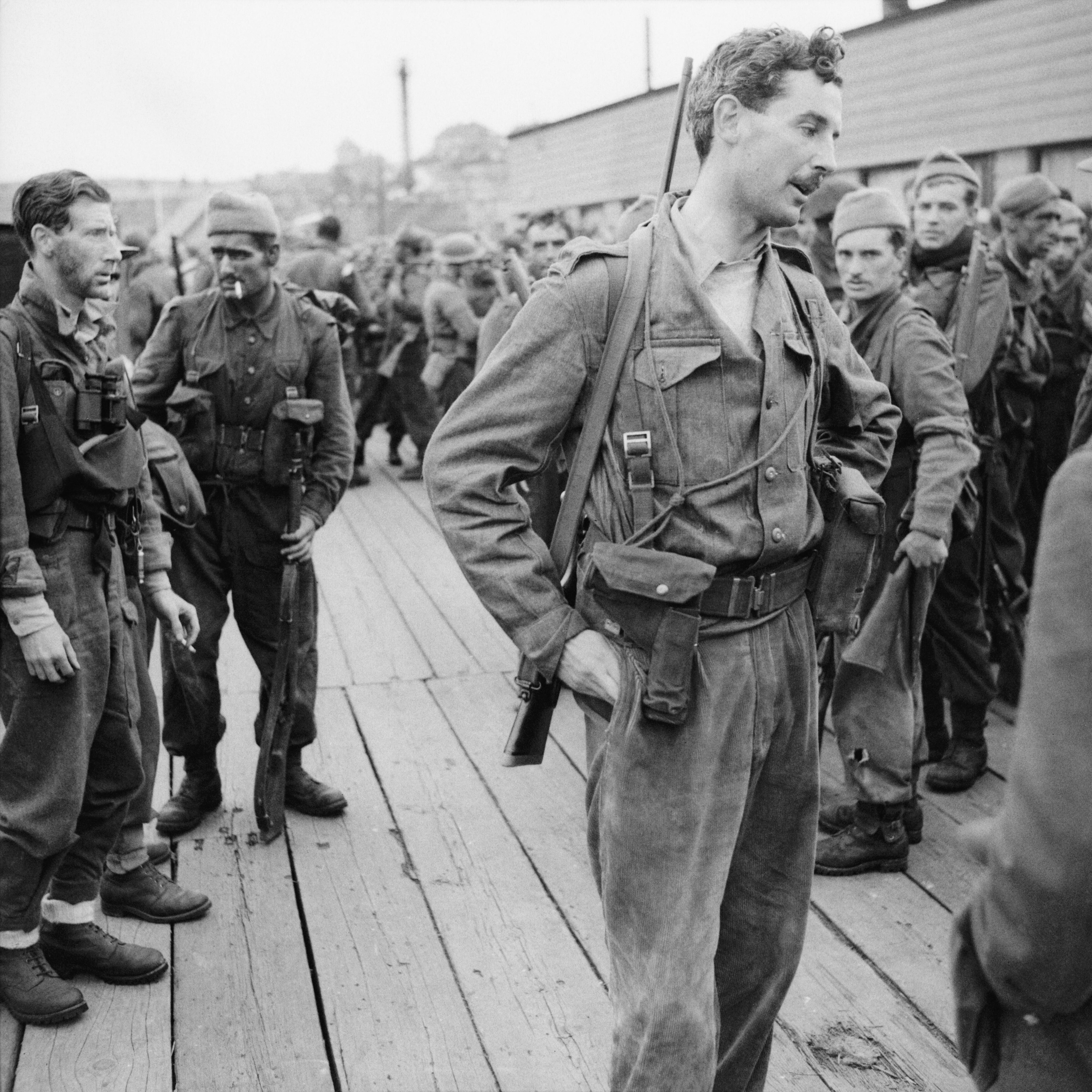
Lord Lovat and men from No. 4 Commando after the Dieppe raid

36 Commando raids were targeted against France between 1940 and 1944, mostly small affairs involving between 10 and 25 men. Some of the larger raids involved one or more commando units. In March 1942, No. 2 Commando plus demolition experts from seven other Commando units took part in Operation Chariot, also known as the St. Nazaire Raid. The destroyer HMS Campbeltown, accompanied by 18 smaller ships, sailed into St. Nazaire where Campbeltown was rammed directly into the Normandie dock gates. The Commandos engaged the German forces and destroyed the dock facilities. Eight hours later, delayed-action fuses set off the explosives in the Campbeltown, which wrecked the dock gates and killed some 360 Germans and French. A total of 611 soldiers and sailors took part in Chariot; 169 were killed and 200 (most wounded) taken prisoner. Only 242 men returned. Of the 241 Commandos who took part 64 were killed or missing and 109 captured. Lieutenant-Colonel Augustus Charles Newman and Sergeant Thomas Durrant of the Commandos, plus three members of the Royal Navy, were awarded the Victoria Cross. Eighty others received decorations for gallantry.

On 19 August 1942 a major landing took place at the French coastal town of Dieppe. The main force was provided by the 2nd Canadian Infantry Division, supported by No. 3 and No. 4 Commandos. The mission of No. 3 Commando was to neutralize a German coastal battery near Berneval-le-Grand that was in a position to fire upon the landing at Dieppe. The landing craft carrying No. 3 Commando ran into a German coastal convoy. Only a handful of commandos, under the second in command Major Peter Young, landed and scaled the barbed wire laced cliffs. Eventually 18 Commandos reached the perimeter of the battery via Berneval and engaged the target with small arms fire. Although unable to destroy the guns, they prevented the Germans from firing effectively on the main assault by harassing their gun crews with sniper fire. In a subsidiary operation No. 4 Commando landed in force along with the French Troop No. 10 (Inter-Allied) Commando and 50 United States Army Rangers and destroyed the artillery battery at Varengeville. Most of No. 4 Commando safely returned to England. Captain Patrick Porteous of No. 4 Commando was awarded the Victoria Cross for his actions during the raid.

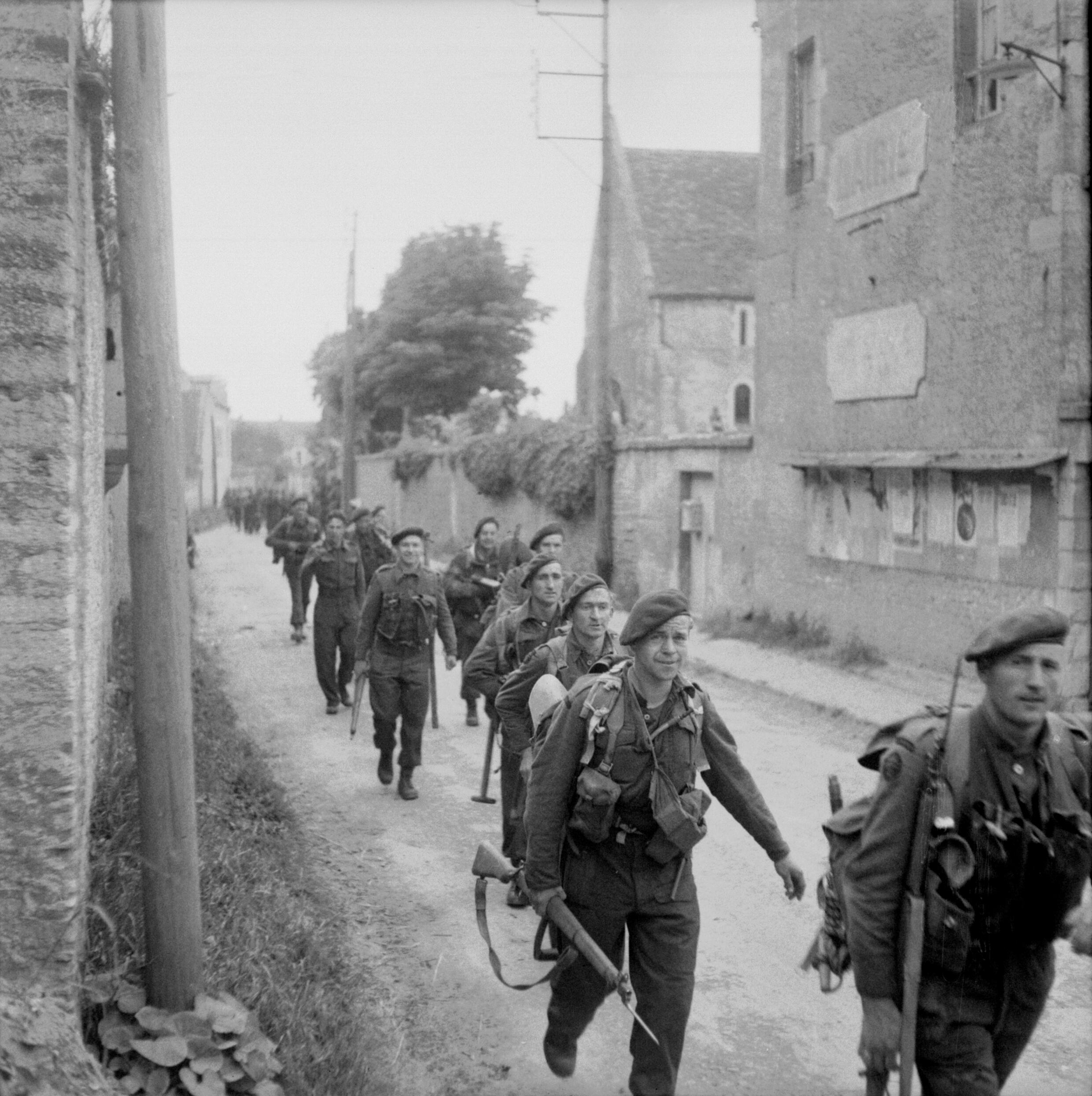
Royal Marines Commandos on their way to relieve the 6th Airborne Division at Pegasus Bridge, 6 June 1944

During the Normandy landings of 6 June 1944 two Special Service Brigades were deployed. The 1st Special Service Brigade landed behind the British 3rd Infantry Division on Sword Beach. Their main objective was to fight through to the 6th Airborne Division that had landed overnight and was holding the northern flank and the bridges over the Orne River. The Commandos cleared the town of Ouistreham and headed for the bridges, about 10 miles (16 km) away. Arriving at the Pegasus Bridge, the Commandos fought on the left flank of the Orne bridgehead until they were ordered to withdraw. The brigade remained in Normandy for ten weeks, sustaining 1,000 casualties, including the brigade commander, Brigadier Lord Lovat. The all Royal Marines 4th Special Service Brigade was also involved in the Normandy landings. No. 48 Commando landed on the left flank of Juno Beach and No. 41 Commando landed on the right flank of Sword Beach and then assaulted Lion-sur-Mer. No. 48 Commando landed in front of the St. Aubin-sur-Mer strong point and lost forty percent of its men. The last 4th Brigade unit ashore was No. 47 Commando, which landed on Gold Beach near the town of Asnells. Five of the Landing Craft Assault carrying them ashore were sunk by mines and beach obstacles, which resulted in the loss of 76 of their 420 men. These losses delayed their advance to their primary objective, the port of Port-en-Bessin, which they captured the following day.

=== Netherlands ===
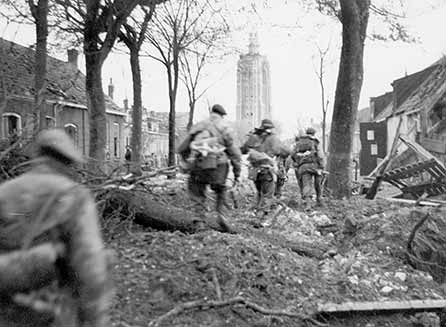
No. 41 (Royal Marine) Commando advance through Westkapelle towards the lighthouse

The Battle of the Scheldt started 1 November 1944, with 4th Special Service Brigade assigned to carry out a seaborne assault on the island of Walcheren. The plan was for the island to be attacked from two directions, with the Commandos coming by sea and the Canadian 2nd Division and the 52nd (Lowland) Division attacking across the causeway. No. 4 Commando landed at Flushing and No. 41 and 48 at Westkapelle. No. 47 Commando was held in reserve and landed after No.s 41 and 48. They were to advance past No. 48 Commando and attempt to link up with No. 4 Commando in the south. On the first day No. 41 captured an artillery observation tower at Westkapelle and cleared the rest of the town. They then moved along the coast and dealt with the coastal defence installations.

No. 48 Commando quickly captured a radar station and then advanced on a gun battery south of Westkapelle, which was captured before nightfall. On 2 November No. 47 Commando advanced through No. 48 Commando to attack a gun battery at Zoutelande. The attack failed, with the unit suffering heavy casualties, including all the rifle troop commanders. The next day No. 47, supported by No. 48 Commando, again attacked the Zoutelande gun battery. This time they managed to continue the advance and link up with No. 4 Commando. The capture of these batteries allowed the navy to start sweeping the channel into Antwerp for mines. On 5 November, No. 41 Commando captured the gun battery north east of Domburg; this left only one battery still under German control. The brigade regrouped and concentrated its assault on the last position. Just before the attack began on 9 November, the 4,000 men in the battery surrendered. This was quickly followed by the surrender of the rest of the island's garrison.

=== Germany ===
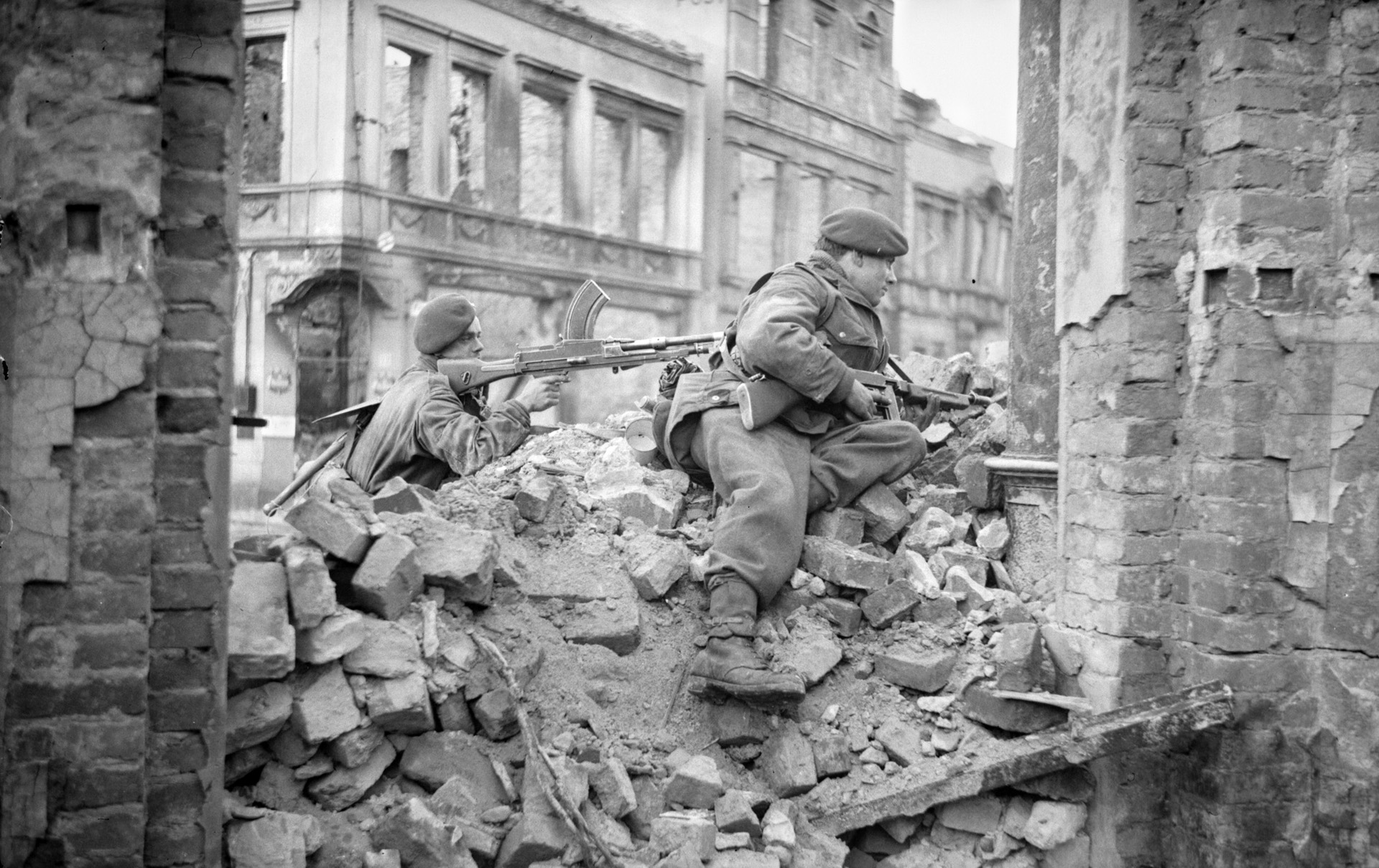
Men of the 1st Commando Brigade in Osnabrück, 4 April 1945

In January 1945 the 1st Commando Brigade were involved in Operation Blackcock, where Lance Corporal Henry Harden of the Royal Army Medical Corps, attached to No. 45 (Royal Marine) Commando was awarded the Victoria Cross.

The 1st Commando Brigade next took part in Operation Plunder, the crossing of the Rhine River in March 1945. After a heavy artillery bombardment on the evening of 23 March 1945, the brigade carried out the initial assault under cover of darkness with the 15th (Scottish) Division and the 51st (Highland) Division. The Germans had moved most of their reserve troops to the Ludendorff Bridge at Remagen, which had just been captured by the U.S. 9th Armored Division. The Commandos crossed the Rhine at a point 2 miles (3.2 km) west of Wesel. Their crossing was unopposed and the brigade headed to the outskirts of Wesel. Here they waited until a raid of 200 bombers of the Royal Air Force finished their attack, during which over 1,000 tons of bombs were dropped. Moving into the city just after midnight, the Commandos met resistance from defenders organised around an anti-aircraft division. It was not until 25 March that all resistance ended and the brigade declared the city taken.

=== Burma ===
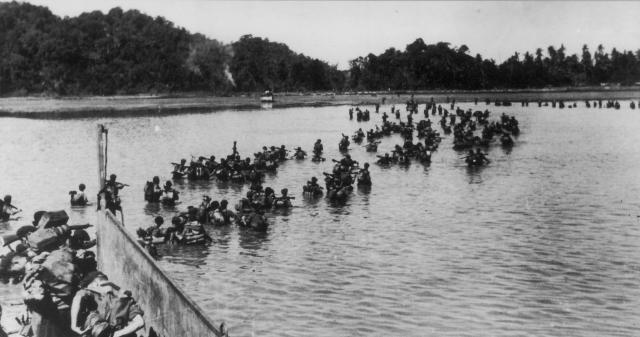
3rd Commando Brigade coming ashore from landing craft during the Burma Campaign

During the Burma Campaign in 1944–1945, the 3rd Commando Brigade participated in several coastal landings of the Southern Front offensive. These landings culminated in the battle of Hill 170 at Kangaw. Here Lieutenant George Knowland of No. 1 Commando was awarded a posthumous Victoria Cross. The Commandos' victory in the 36-hour battle for Hill 170 cut off the escape of the 54th Japanese Division. Further amphibious landings by the 25th Indian Infantry Division and the overland advance of the 82nd (West Africa) Division made the Japanese position in the Arakan untenable. A general withdrawal was ordered to avoid the complete destruction of the Twenty-Eighth Japanese Army. The Commando brigade was then withdrawn to India in preparation for Operation Zipper, the planned invasion of Malaya. The Zipper landings were not needed due to the Japanese surrender so the brigade was sent to Hong Kong for policing duties instead.

== Legacy ==
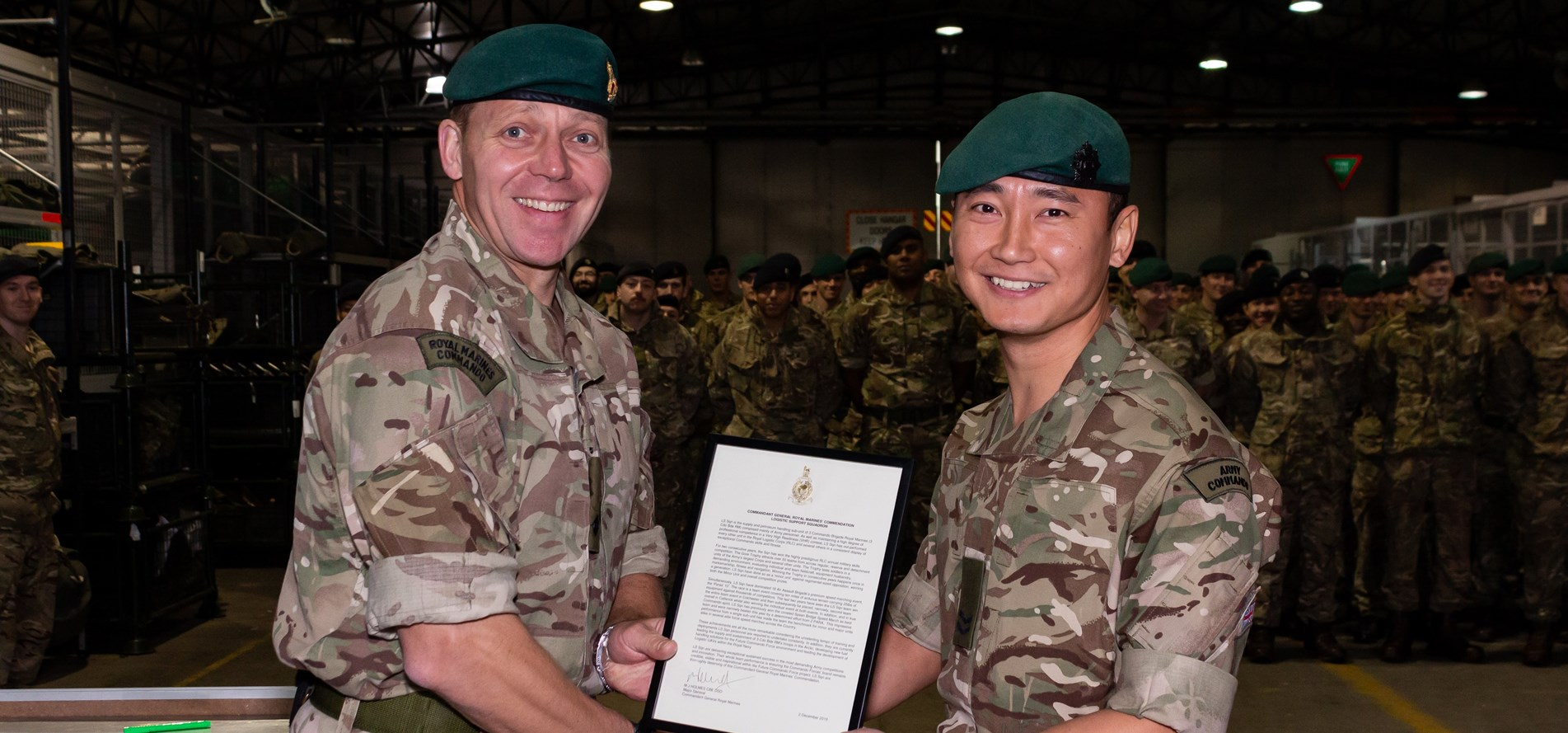
A Royal Marines Commando and an Army Commando (right) in 2019.

At the end of the Second World War, all the British Army, Royal Navy, Royal Air Force, and some Royal Marines Commandos were disbanded. This left only three Royal Marines Commandos and one brigade (with supporting Army elements). As of 2010, the British Commando force is 3 Commando Brigade, which consists of both Royal Marines and British Army components, as well as commando-trained personnel from the Royal Navy and Royal Air Force. Other units of the British armed forces, which can trace their origins to the British Commandos of the Second World War, are the Parachute Regiment, the Ranger Regiment, the Special Air Service, and the Special Boat Service.

Of the Western nations represented in No. 10 (Inter-Allied) Commando, only Norway did not develop a post-war commando force. The French troops were the predecessors of the Commandos Marine. The Dutch Troops were the predecessors of the Korps Commandotroepen and the Belgian Troops were the predecessors of the Immediate Reaction Cell. The 1st Battalion of the United States Army Rangers were also influenced by the British Commandos. Their first volunteers were from troops stationed in Northern Ireland, who were sent to train at the Commando depot at Achnacarry. Subsequent Ranger battalions were formed and trained independent of British influence.

The men serving with the Commandos were awarded 479 decorations during the war. This includes eight Victoria Crosses awarded to all ranks. Officers were awarded 37 Distinguished Service Orders with nine bars for a second award and 162 Military Crosses with 13 bars. Other ranks were awarded 32 Distinguished Conduct Medals and 218 Military Medals. In 1952 the Commando Memorial was unveiled by the Queen Mother. It is now a Category A listed monument in Scotland, dedicated to the men of the original British Commando Forces raised during Second World War. Situated around a mile from Spean Bridge village, it overlooks the training areas of the Commando Training Depot established in 1942 at Achnacarry Castle.

== Battle honours ==
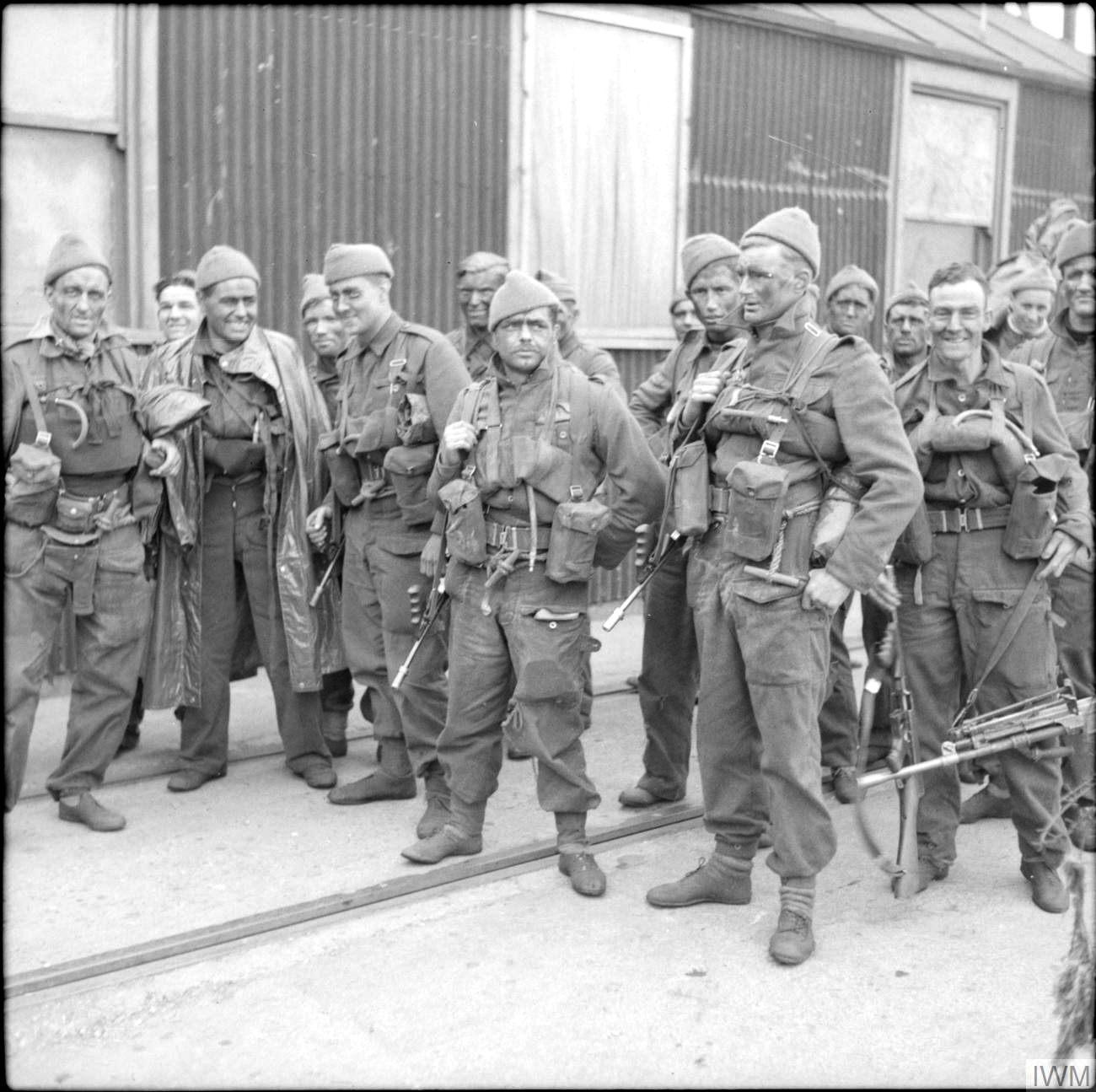
Commandos after a raid in France, 1942

In the British Army battle honours are awarded to regiments that have seen active service in a significant engagement or campaign, generally (although not always) one with a victorious outcome. The following battle honours were awarded to the British Commandos during the Second World War.

- Adriatic
- Alethangyaw
- Aller
- Anzio
- Argenta Gap
- Burma 1943–1945
- Crete
- Dieppe
- Dives Crossing
- Djebel Choucha
- Flushing
- Greece 1944–1945
- Italy 1943–1945
- Kangow
- Landing at Porto San Venere
- Landing in Sicily
- Leese
- Litani
- Madagascar
- Middle East 1941, 1942, 1944
- Monte Ornito
- Myebon
- Normandy Landings
- North Africa 1941–1943
- North-West Europe 1942, 1944, 1945
- Norway 1941
- Pursuit to Messina
- Rhine
- St. Nazaire
- Salerno
- Sedjenane 1
- Sicily 1943
- Steamroller Farm
- Syria 1941
- Termoli
- Vaagso
- Valli di Comacchio
- Westkapelle

== Bibliography ==
- Binney, Marcus (2006). Secret War Heroes. London: Hodder and Stoughton. ISBN 978-0-340-82910-3.
- Bishop, Chris (2002). The Encyclopedia of Weapons of WWII. New York: Sterling Publishing Company, Inc. ISBN 1-58663-762-2.
- Brayley, Martin; Chappell, Mike (2001). British Army 1939–45 (1): North-West Europe. Oxford: Osprey Publishing. ISBN 1-84176-052-8.
- Chappell, Mike (1996). Army Commandos 1940–1945. London: Osprey Publishing. ISBN 1-85532-579-9.
- Churchill, Winston (1949). The Second World War, Vol II, Their Finest Hour. Cassell & Co Ltd.
- Coop, Terry (2006). Cinderella Army: The Canadians in Northwest Europe, 1944–1945. Toronto: University of Toronto Press. ISBN 0-8020-3925-1.
- Dunning, James (2003). The Fighting Fourth: No. 4 Commando at War 1940–45. Stroud, England: Sutton. ISBN 978-0-7509-3095-6.
- Forty, George (1998). British Army handbook, 1939–1945. Stroud: Sutton. ISBN 978-0-7509-3190-8.
- Griffin, P.D (2006). Encyclopedia of Modern British Army Regiments. Stroud: Sutton Publishing. ISBN 0-7509-3929-X.
- Haskew, Michael E (2007). Encyclopaedia of Elite Forces in the Second World War. Barnsley: Pen and Sword. ISBN 978-1-84415-577-4.
- Jones, Tim (2006). SAS Zero Hour: The Secret Origins of the Special Air Service. London: Greenhill Books. ISBN 1-85367-669-1.
- Joslen, H. F. (2003) [1960]. Orders of Battle: Second World War, 1939–1945. Uckfield, East Sussex: Naval and Military Press. ISBN 978-1-84342-474-1.
- Laffin, John (1999). Raiders: Great Exploits of the Second World War. Stroud: Sutton. ISBN 0-7509-1525-0.
- Macksey, Kenneth (1990). Commando: Hit-and-run Combat in World War II. Chelsea: Scarborough House. ISBN 0-8128-2973-5.
- Macksey, Kenneth; Woodhouse, William (1991). The Penguin Encyclopedia of Modern Warfare: 1850 to the Present Day. London; New York: Viking. ISBN 0-670-82698-7.
- Mcdonald, Charles Brown (2005). The Last Offensive: The European Theater of Operations. Washington: University Press of the Pacific. ISBN 1-4102-2072-9.
- Messenger, Charles (1985). The Commandos: 1940–1946. London: Kimber. ISBN 0-7183-0553-1.
- Messenger, Charles (1991). The Last Prussian: A Biography of Field Marshal Gerd von Rundstedt, 1875–1953. London; Washington: Brassey's. ISBN 0-08-036707-0.
- Messenger, Charles (2004). The D Day Atlas. London: Thames & Hudson. ISBN 978-0-500-25123-2.
- Moreman, Timothy Robert (2006). British Commandos 1940–46. London: Osprey Publishing. ISBN 1-84176-986-X.
- Morgan, Mike (2000). Daggers Drawn: Second World War Heroes of the SAS and SBS. Stroud: Sutton. ISBN 0-7509-2509-4.
- Owen, James (2012). Commando. London: Little, Brown. ISBN 978-1-4087-0302-1.
- Parker, John (2000). Commandos: The Inside Story of Britain's Most Elite Fighting Force. London: Headline. ISBN 978-0-7472-7008-9.
- Rottman, Gordon L (1987). US Army Rangers & LRRP Units 1942–87. London: Osprey Publishing. ISBN 0-85045-795-5.
- Saunders, Hilary St. George (1971). The Green Beret: The Commandos at War. London: Four Square Books. ISBN 0-450-01007-4.
- Saunders, Paul (2005). The British Channel Islands Under German Occupation, 1940–1945. Jersey: Jersey Heritage Trust. ISBN 0-9538858-3-6.
- Shortt, James; McBride, Angus (1981). The Special Air Service. London: Osprey Publishing. ISBN 0-85045-396-8.
- van der Bijl, Nick (2006). No. 10 Inter-Allied Commando 1942–45. Oxford: Osprey Publishing. ISBN 1-84176-999-1.
- van der Bijl, Nick; Hannon, Paul (1995). The Royal Marines 1939–93. Oxford: Osprey. ISBN 978-1-85532-388-9.
- Zuehlke, Mark (2005). Juno Beach: Canada's D-Day Victory – June 6, 1944. Vancouver, B.C.: Douglas & McIntyre. ISBN 1-55365-091-3.
