= No. 4 Commando =

British Army Commando unit

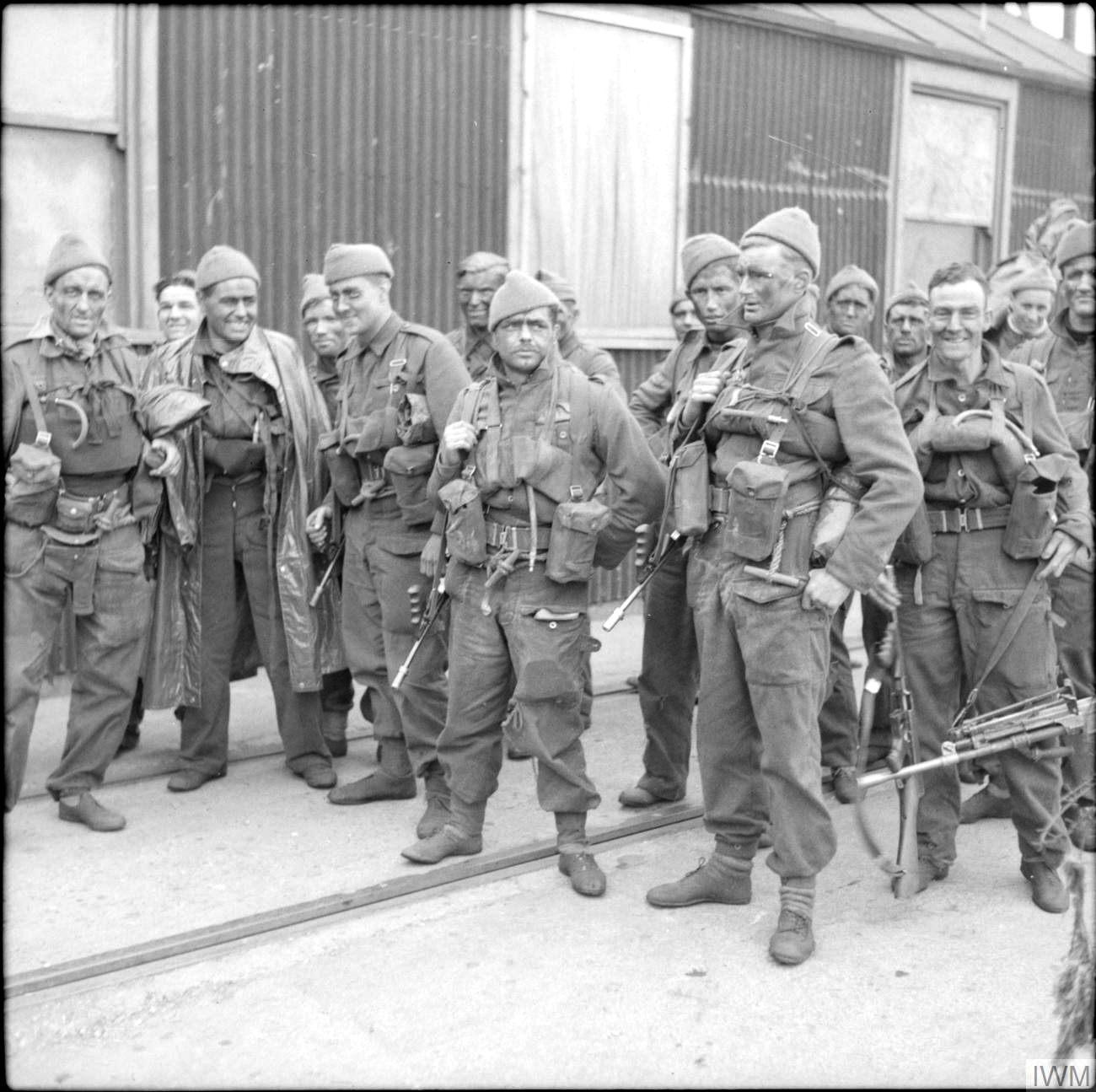
- No. 4 Commando after a raid on France, April 1942.
- Active: 1940–1946
- Country: United Kingdom
- Allegiance: British Army
- Branch: Special Services Group
- Type: Commando
- Role: Amphibious warfare Close-quarters combat Coastal raiding Cold-weather warfare Direct action Forward observer Raiding; Reconnaissance; Urban warfare
- Size: 500 all ranks
- Part of: 1st Special Service Brigade; 4th Special Service Brigade
- Nickname: Cavalry Commando
- Engagements: Second World War; Operation Claymore; Operation Abercrombie; Dieppe raid Normandy landings Battle of the Scheldt

Commanders
- Notable commanders: Lord Lovat

Insignia
- Combined Operations tactical recognition flash

No. 4 Commando was a battalion-sized Commando unit of the British Army during the Second World War formed in 1940. Although it was intended to conduct small-scale raids and harass enemy garrisons along the coast of German-occupied France, the unit was mainly employed as a highly trained infantry assault unit.

The unit's first operation was the successful raid on the Lofoten Islands on 4 March 1941. However, their next two planned operations were both cancelled and it was not until 22 April 1942 that No. 4 Commando took part in another raid on the French coastal town of Hardelot. On 22 August 1942, No. 4 Commando was one of three Commando units selected for the Dieppe raid. Under the command of Lord Lovat, the unit landed on the right flank of the main landings and successfully silenced a German gun battery. This was the only complete success of the operation, which was eventually aborted, after less than 10 hours, following heavy Allied losses.

As part of the 1st Special Service Brigade, No. 4 Commando took part in the Normandy landings in June 1944. Landing on Sword Beach 30 minutes before the rest of the brigade, their first objectives were to capture a German strong point and gun battery in Ouistreham. After the unit neutralised these positions they rejoined the brigade, reinforcing the 6th Airborne Division at the Orne bridges. Before the invasion, the brigade had been informed that they would stay in France for only a few days. No. 4 Commando remained there for a further 82 days, protecting the beachhead's left flank. During that period, the unit endured over 50% casualties. Finally withdrawn to Britain in September 1944, they were reassigned to the 4th Special Service Brigade for the assault on Walcheren island. At the end of the war No. 4 Commando became part of the British Army of the Rhine, but together with all of the British Army's Commando units was disbanded in 1946.

== Background ==
The British Commandos were organised for special service in June 1940. After the Dunkirk evacuation, the prime minister of the United Kingdom, Winston Churchill, called for a force to be assembled and equipped to inflict casualties on the Germans and bolster British morale. Churchill told the joint Chiefs of Staff to propose measures for an offensive against German-occupied Europe, and stated, "they must be prepared with specially trained troops of the hunter class who can develop a reign of terror down the enemy coast." One staff officer, Lieutenant Colonel Dudley Clarke, had already submitted such a proposal to General Sir John Dill, the Chief of the Imperial General Staff (CIGS). Dill, aware of Churchill's intentions, approved Clarke's proposal and on 23 June 1940, the first commando raid took place.

The request for volunteers for special service was initially restricted to serving Army soldiers within certain formations still in Britain, and from men of the disbanding divisional Independent Companies originally raised from Territorial Army (TA) divisions who had served in the Norwegian Campaign. (Note: The 10 independent companies were raised from volunteers in second line Territorial Army divisions in April 1940. They were intended for guerrilla style operations in Norway following the German invasion. Each of the 10 companies initially consisted of 21 officers and 268 other ranks.)

By November 1940, more than 2,000 men had volunteered and were organised into four battalions in a Special Service Brigade, under the command of Brigadier J. C. Haydon. The Brigade quickly expanded to 12 battalions, which were renamed commandos. Each commando had a lieutenant colonel as the commanding officer (CO) and numbered around 450 men (divided into 75 man troops that were further divided into 15 man sections). Technically these men were only on secondment to the commandos; they retained their regimental cap badges and remained on the regimental roll for pay. The new force of commandos came under the operational control of the Combined Operations Headquarters.

== Formation ==
No. 4 Commando was formed in Weymouth on 21 July 1940, when the first intake of 500 volunteers arrived. The unique nature of the commandos immediately became apparent when every man was held responsible for finding his own quarters. As commandos were expected to be fighting troops, they had no administrative personnel, such as clerks and cooks for example. To assist them with living 'off camp', with no cook house all ranks were given a daily allowance and a ration card, the allowance being 67 pence for officers and of 34 pence for other ranks. This arrangement meant that commandos lived on civilian rations, while the rest of the armed forces had the more plentiful military scale of rations.

Lieutenant Colonel C.P.D Legard, 5RIDG and the Regimental Sergeant Major W. Morris held their first parade on 22 July 1940, at Weymouth Pavilion. The volunteers were informed of the intended role for the commandos and that training would be "tough and demanding and any who could not measure up to the standard required would be returned to their parent unit without any leave of appeal".

Training started immediately and concentrated on physical fitness, weapons training, movement across country including cliff climbing, obstacle crossing and raiding operations. Weapons training was limited by the lack of anything other than the personal weapons (rifles and pistols) that each man had brought with him. Machine guns or anything heavier were not available at the time. In August 1940, some officers and non-commissioned officers (NCO) were sent to Achnacarry in the Scottish Highlands on a commando course. These men were then responsible for teaching the rest of the unit.

No. 4 Commando remained at Weymouth until 13 October 1940, when it boarded trains for Scotland. Arriving on the River Clyde at 06:00 the next day, they were sent on board HMS Glengyle, an Infantry landing ship. Glengyle sailed on 18 October for Inveraray, to conduct training for the first time with Assault Landing Craft. The move to Scotland became permanent and No. 4 Commando were based at Ayr.

While all this was going on, a decision was made to concentrate the commandos and Independent Companies into five large 1,000 man battalions, each of two companies. No. 4 Commando was renamed the No. 1 Company of the 3rd Special Service Battalion, under the command of Lieutenant Colonel Dudley Lister. No. 2 Company was formed by the re-designation of No. 7 Commando. This new formation proved to be too large and unwieldy in practice. Within three months, the Special Service Battalions were disbanded and the original commando units reformed but on a smaller scale with six troops instead of the original ten. Each troop would comprise three officers and 62 other ranks; this number was set so each troop would fit into two Assault Landing Craft. The new formation also meant that two complete Commando units could be carried in the 'Glen' type landing ship and one unit in the 'Dutch' type landing ship.

== Operational history ==
=== Lofoten Islands ===
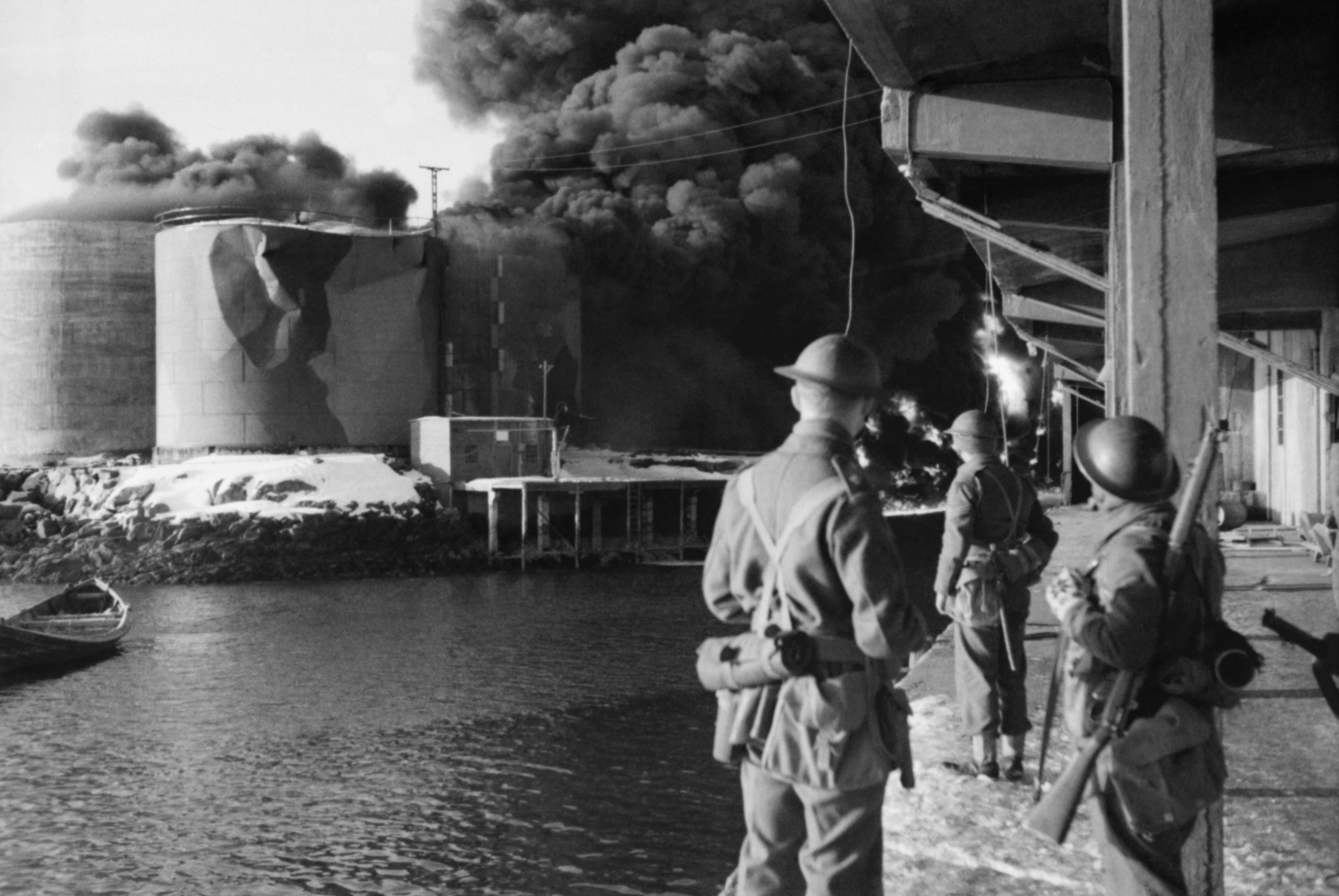
Commandos watching the fish oil tanks burn.

On 20 February 1941, No. 4 Commando were informed they would be going to Troon in Scotland for an exercise. The next day the unit boarded HMS Queen Emma, but on 22 February 1941, after they anchored at Scapa Flow, their real objective was divulged. Together with No. 3 Commando they were to conduct Operation Claymore, a raid on the Lofoten Islands. Claymore's main objective was to stop the manufacture of fish oil and its exportation to Germany, where it was used in making explosives.

Extra training commenced on board ship, including how the men were to get to their boat stations to disembark. Each troop also rehearsed its own part in the mission. Lectures were given in escape and evasion and troop commanders and NCO's were given small silk maps of Norway to help with any escape attempt. Another item of escape equipment issued was a pair of trouser fly buttons that, when placed one on top of the other, became a small compass.

Claymore took place on 4 March 1941. The Germans were caught unprepared and the landings were unopposed. Within an hour No. 4 Commando had taken all its objectives. The raid was a success: 11 fish oil factories and storage tanks were destroyed, 10 ships sunk, 225 prisoners taken with an unknown number of German sailors killed on the sunken ships. An added bonus were the 315 Norwegian volunteers brought back to join the Free Norwegian Forces.

=== Operation Puma ===
After returning from Norway, training started for Operation Puma, the occupation of the Canary Islands. The operation was planned following intelligence that Spain was going to join the war on the side of the Axis forces. The intention was to prevent Germany using the islands as a U-boat base. The force assembled included five commando units, an army brigade, two Royal Marine brigades and supporting arms. Training for Operation Puma culminated in landing exercises in the Hebrides from the Landing Ship, Infantry HMS Royal Scotsman. The operation was renamed Operation Pilgrim and after a number of delays was put on hold by the Chiefs-of-Staff. On 13 September a token force including a troop from No. 4 Commando was dispatched to West Africa. The troop was based in Sierra Leone and Nigeria until returning to Britain in February 1942, after the cancellation of the operation. While this was happening a new second in command (2IC) was appointed, Major Charles Vaughan, and a Captain Lord Lovat joined the unit as the training officer. Lovat had been attached to the Lofoten raid as an observer and had applied for a posting to the commandos.

=== Operation Bludgeon ===
In February 1942, A, B and C Troops were dispatched to the Outer Hebrides under the command of Captain Lord Lovat for extra training. Returning to Troon in March, they were immediately sent to Dartmouth, Devon where they embarked on HMS Prins Albert. Once on board they were informed about Operation Bludgeon and started mission training. The objective of this raid was a large building that was a short distance inland from the Dutch coast, and that was used by senior German officers. For the duration of the operation B Troop were issued with flamethrowers to set the building on fire. After several days training, the commandos moved around the coast and anchored in the Thames waiting for the order to go. The operation was eventually cancelled, due to the increased German E-Boat activity in the area of the landing.

=== St Nazaire ===
The St Nazaire raid had the objective of destroying the Normandie dry dock, which would prevent its use by any large German warship if that had been damaged or in need of repair. The majority of land force for the raid was supplied by No. 2 Commando, led by Lieutenant Colonel Newman. However the Special Service Brigade headquarters, used the raid to provide experience for their other units and 92 men were drawn from, No's 1, 3, 4, 5, 9 and 12 Commandos to go on the raid. The No. 4 Commando contingent was 12 other ranks commanded by Lieutenant H Pennington. They had all previously served in the Royal Engineers and left under the impression they were going on a Harbour Demolition Course. After their training at Cardiff and Southampton Docks only six of the 12 were selected to go on the raid. Three of the six including Lieutenant Pennington were killed before they were able to land, when their Motor Launch was engaged by the German coastal defence batteries. The other men who had not been selected for the raid were returned to No. 4 Commando.

=== Operation Abercrombie ===
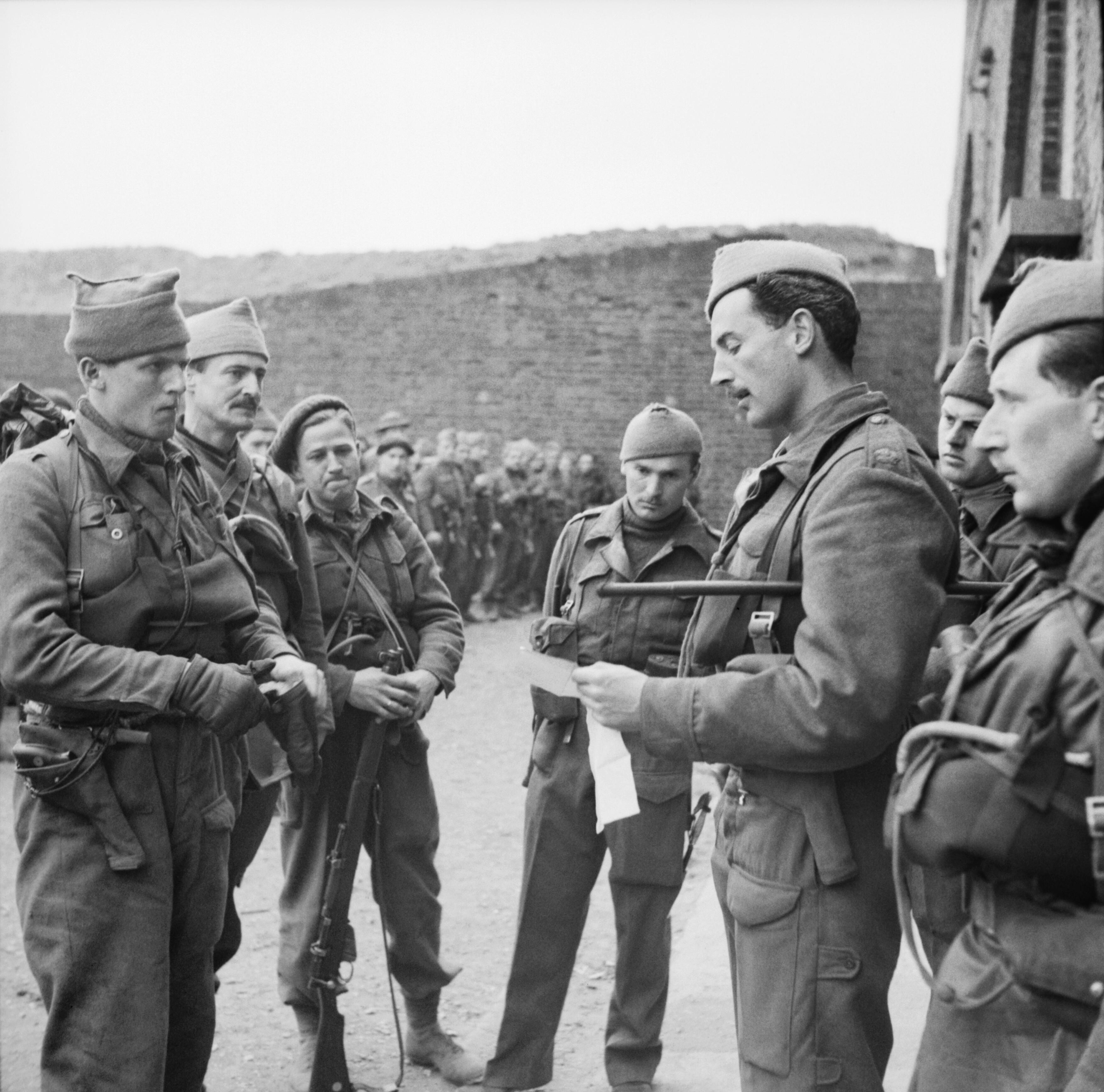
Major Lord Lovat, giving orders before setting out on Operation Abercrombie 21 April 1942.

Operation Abercrombie was a raid on the French coastal town of Hardelot. Only B and C Troops supported by detachments from the Royal Engineers and the Carleton and York Regiment of Canada participated. The raid was under the overall command of Lord Lovat, with the objective of capturing prisoners and causing as much damage as possible. For this raid they were going to try a different system to cross the channel. Instead of using Infantry Landing Ships to cross the Channel they would be taken across on Motor Gun Boats towing Assault Landing Craft (LCA). The combined force left Dover on 19 April 1942. En route, one LCA sank with the loss of two commandos who were manning a Bren gun in the bow. The raid was called off and they returned to Dover. A replacement LCA was obtained and they returned to France on 21 April. This time the crossing was uneventful and the commandos made a successful landing. However, the two commando troops were discovered cutting the barbed wire beach obstacles and German machine guns opened fire. The raiders did carry out a reconnaissance of the area but were unable to capture any prisoners. The commandos returned without loss, but one man was wounded in the leg. The smaller Canadian detachment was unable to locate the target beach and returned to Britain. After the raid there was another change in command. Lieutenant Colonel Lister left to form No. 10 (Inter-Allied) Commando and Major Vaughan became the temporary commanding officer. Vaughan left shortly afterwards to take over command of the Commando Depot at Achnacarry and was succeeded by Lord Lovat with Major Derek Mills-Roberts becoming the 2IC.

=== Dieppe Raid ===
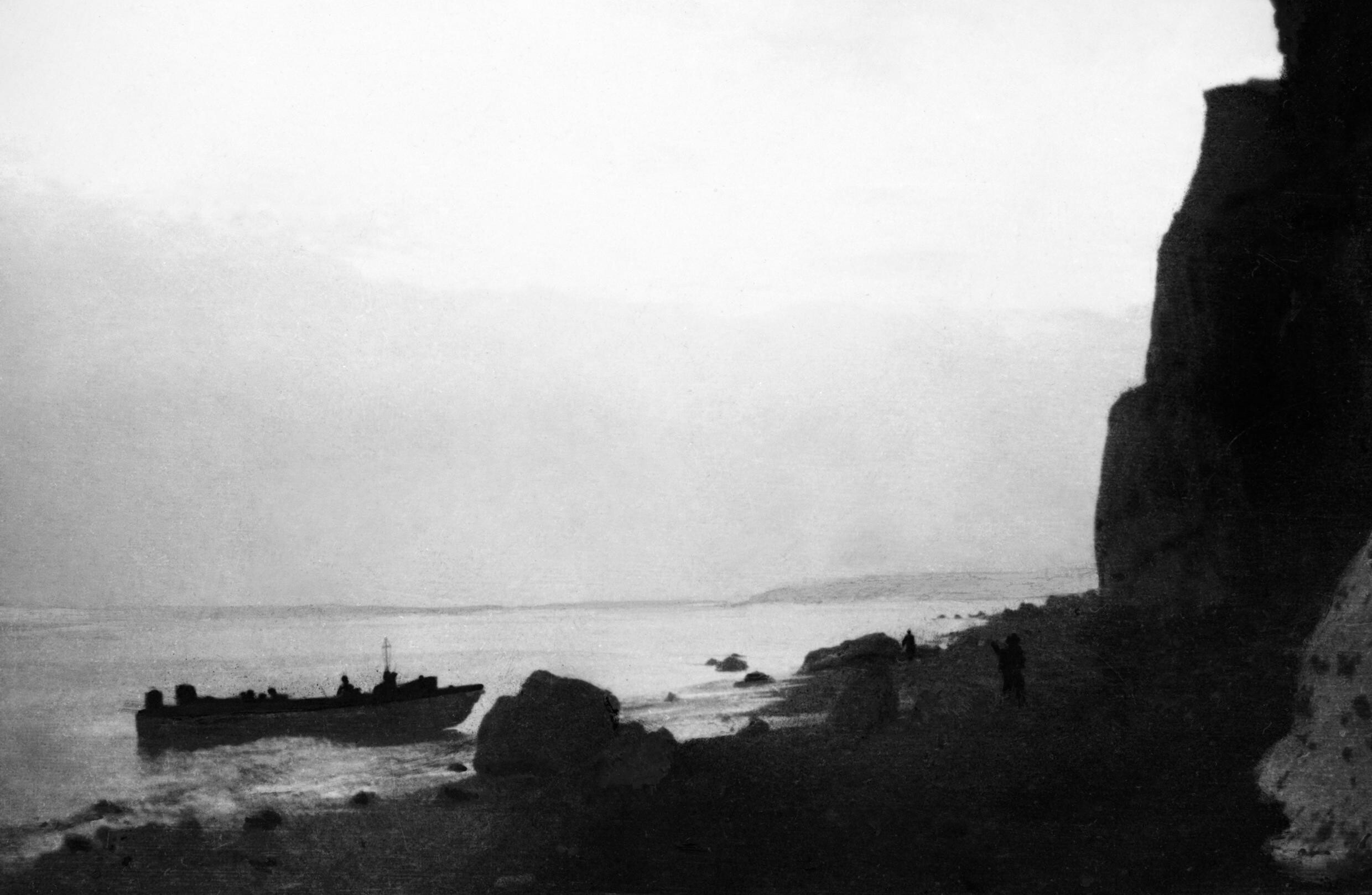
Landing craft of No 4 Commando running in to land at Orange one beach, on the right flank of the main assault at Dieppe.

Originally conceived in April 1942, "Operation Rutter" was to conduct a major division-sized raid on a German held port of Dieppe on the French channel coast and to hold it for the duration of at least two tides. They would effect the greatest amount of destruction of enemy facilities and defences before withdrawing. The original plan was approved by the Chiefs of Staff in May 1942. This plan included two parachute landings behind the artillery batteries on either side of the main landing beaches. The parachute operation was later cancelled and instead No. 3, No. 4 and the newly formed 'A' (Royal Marine) Commando were to land by sea and attack the artillery batteries and the harbour. The Dieppe Raid was a major operation planned by Admiral Lord Mountbatten and Combined Operations Headquarters. The attacking force consisted of around 6,000 troops. The Royal Navy supplied 237 ships and landing craft, and the Royal Air Force 74 squadrons of aircraft, of which 66 were fighter squadrons.

Landing on the eastern flank No. 3 Commando would assault the Goebbels artillery battery, while No. 4 Commando would be responsible for the Hess battery on the western flank. The Hess battery consisted of six 150 millimetres (5.9 in) guns in a concrete emplacement 1,100 yards (1,000 m) inland from the coastal cliffs. The emplacement was surrounded by two rows of barbed wire, and protected by several machine gun posts. A nearby anti-aircraft tower could also defend against a ground attack on the guns. The commandos were responsible for their own planning and selected two landing beaches codenamed Orange one and two. Orange One at Varengeville was overlooked by a chalk cliff but had two gullies leading to the top of the cliff. Before the war there were steps down to the beach. But these had been removed and the gullies filled with barbed wire and other obstacles. The second beach Orange Two was at Quiberville 1.5 miles (2.4 km) further west at the mouth of the River Saane. This offered access to the top of the cliffs but was covered by two machine gun pillboxes and barbed wire and it was further away from their target. Intelligence had estimated that the strength of the battery was between 120–175 men, supported by two infantry companies stationed nearby.

The plan was for four troops (A, B, C and F), headquarters and attached specialists, to be divided into two groups. (Note: Also with No. 4 Commando were, fifty United States Rangers to gain raiding experience, two Canadian signallers to communicate with the Canadian divisional headquarters and three men from Phantom Squadron to provide communications with Combined Operations Headquarters back in Britain. From No. 10 (Inter-Allied) Commando four Frenchmen were also included, to act as interpreters, obtain intelligence and try to persuade other Frenchmen to return with them to Britain.) Group one under the command of Major Mills-Roberts would land at Orange One and consisted of C Troop, a section from A Troop, the mortar detachment and some of the specialists. They would scale the cliffs and form a fire base in the woods in front of the battery to support the assault. Group two commanded by Lieutenant Colonel Lovat would land at Orange Two and take out the beach defences. B and F Troops would then advance move along the river and assault the battery from the rear. The rest of A Troop would be the reserve, positioned between the two beaches. After the attack Group two would withdraw through Group one and be picked up by the waiting LCAs on Orange One beach.

No. 4 Commando made the crossing to Dieppe on board HMS Prins Albert. The crossing was uneventful and at 04:50 just before daybreak Group one landed unopposed. Using two Bangalore torpedoes to blow a hole in the barbed wire, they managed to scale the cliffs. As they approached the battery at 05:45 it opened fire on the main landing force coming ashore at Dieppe. This was 30 minutes before Group one was expected to be in a position but Mills-Roberts responded by speeding up the advance to get their guns into action sooner. Once in position they opened fire on the battery with their mortars, Bren machine guns and sniper rifles. One of the mortar bombs landed inside the battery and exploded the stored charges, putting the guns out of action.

Group two had an opposed landing being greeted by machine gun fire from the two pillboxes guarding the beach. Leaving a section from A Troop to deal with them the rest of the Group ran the 1.5 miles (2.4 km) to the rear of the battery, bypassing German infantry positions on the way. The A Troop section having finished off the pillboxes, set out for Orange one beach, ambushing a German patrol en route. While this was happening Lovat and the other two troops, were preparing to assault the battery from different directions. The men from B Troop approached from behind the anti-aircraft tower, as they could still see some Germans moving about on it, they detached three men to deal with them. At the same time they stumbled across and captured a machine gun post. At 06:15 the assault started, F Troop discovered a group of Germans forming up to put in their own assault on the fire base. Charging into them they were dispersed without loss to the commandos. The troop continued their advance, moving between some buildings and an orchard, when they were themselves caught in the open by heavy gun fire. Two men in the lead the troop commander Captain Pettiward and Lieutenant McDonald were killed while Troop Sergeant Major Stockdale was wounded. It was during this action that the already wounded Captain Porteous, acting as the liaison officer between the two groups was awarded the Victoria Cross. (Note: The citation reads: War Office, 2 October 1942. The King has been graciously pleased to approve the award of The Victoria Cross to: — Captain (temporary Major) Patrick Anthony Porteous (73033), Royal Regiment of Artillery (Fleet, Hants.). At Dieppe on 19 August 1942, Major Porteous was detailed to act as Liaison Officer between the two detachments whose task was to assault the heavy coast defence guns. In the initial assault Major Porteous, working with the smaller of the two detachments, was shot at close range through the hand, the bullet passing through his palm and entering his upper arm. Undaunted, Major Porteous closed with his assailant, succeeded in disarming him and killed him with his own bayonet thereby saving the life of a British Sergeant on whom the German had turned his aim. In the meantime the larger detachment was held up, and the officer leading this detachment was killed and the Troop Sergeant-Major fell seriously wounded. Almost immediately afterwards the only other officer of the detachment was also killed. Major Porteous, without hesitation and in the face of a withering fire, dashed across the open ground to take over the command of this detachment. Rallying them, he led them in a charge which carried the German position at the point of the bayonet, and was severely wounded for the second time. Though shot through the thigh he continued to the final objective where he eventually collapsed from loss of blood after the last of the guns had been destroyed. Major Porteous's most gallant conduct, his brilliant leadership and tenacious devotion to a duty which was supplementary to the role originally assigned to him, was an inspiration to the whole detachment.)

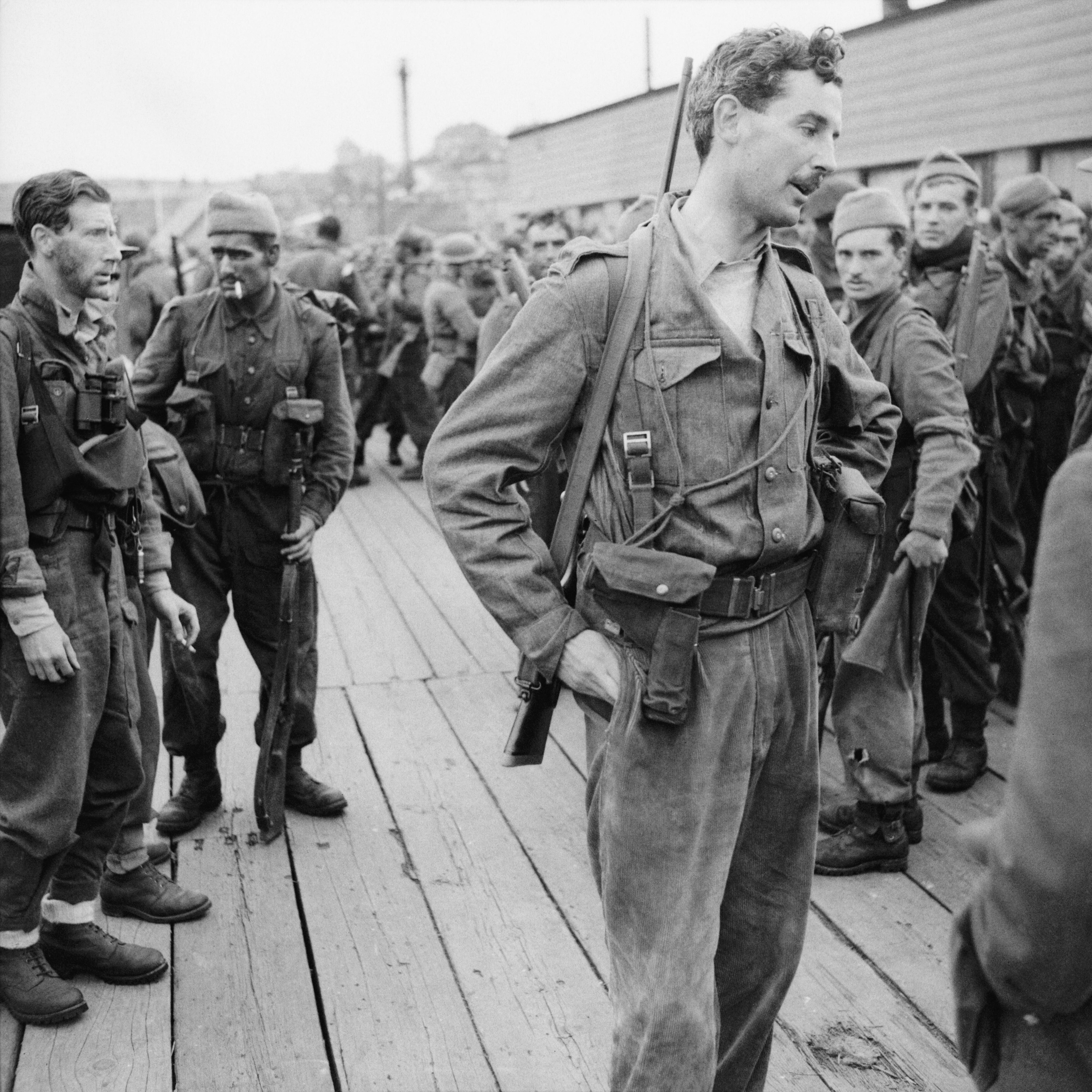
Lord Lovat and No. 4 Commando after the Dieppe raid

The two Groups were in position, when a pre arranged strafing attack by the Royal Air Force commenced, this signalled an increasing in the rate of fire from Group one. At 06:30 a very flare fired by Lovat signalled the start of the assault. Group one ceased firing and B and F Troops charged the battery with bayonets fixed. The objective for B Troop was the battery buildings, while F Troop targeted the guns. Captain Porteous now commanding F Troop was wounded again, this time in the thigh but urged his men on. He was shot for the third time and passed out just as the guns were captured. Demolition experts from F Troop destroyed the guns with pre-formed charges while B Troop searched the battery buildings for intelligence materials. Carrying their wounded with them and escorting prisoners both troops withdrew through the fire base. Still in contact with the Germans both groups of commandos made it to Orange One beach and at 08:15 were taken off by the LCAs. They crossed the channel without incident arriving at Newhaven docks at 17:45 the same day.

For their part in the raid Lovat was awarded the Distinguished Service Order and Mills-Roberts the Military Cross. The cost to the Commando was at first thought to be 23 dead but six were only severely wounded and were eventually reported to be prisoners of war. No. 4 Commandos' assault on the battery was the only successful part of the whole operation. The War Office claimed it as "a classic example of the use of well trained infantry...and a thoroughness in planning, training and execution", and in February 1943 issued an infantry training pamphlet "in order that all may benefit from the story of a stimulating achievement".

=== Between Dieppe and Normandy ===
After Dieppe the headquarters staff changed again. Lovat was promoted to brigadier and given command of the 1st Special Service Brigade. Mills-Roberts was promoted and sent to North Africa to take over command of No. 6 Commando. They were replaced by Robert Dawson as the CO and Ronald Menday as 2IC. Other changes included moving to a new base in Falmouth and the formation of a heavy weapons troop in each commando. The new troop with mortar and Vickers machine gun sections provided the heavy weapons needed for their new role as assault infantry. By now the Commandos had started to move away from smaller raiding operations. They were formed into units intended to spearhead future Allied landing operations. To assist in this they were given the organic fire support weapons, that had been absent when they were a raiding force.

In June 1943, 10 months after the Dieppe raid, No. 4 Commando started a new round of training. The program included mountain warfare training at the Commando Snow and Mountain Warfare Training Centre in Scotland. The emphasis here was on fighting and living in the mountains and instruction in how to train a partisan force. Afterwards they moved to another new base in Sussex. Instead of occupying one town, the troops spread out. A and B Troops were billeted at Seaford, C and D Troops at Newhaven and E and F Troops at Lewes. Training was now almost non stop and a number of large scale landing exercises, using the new Landing Craft Infantry took place. In February 1944, while the rest of No. 4 continued to practice day and night assault landings and live firing exercises. C Troop was sent to qualify as parachutists at the parachute training centre RAF Ringway. The ranks of No. 4 Commando swelled in April 1944 with the arrival of two French troops from No. 10 (Inter-Allied) Commando. Other new arrivals were the Lee–Enfield No. 4 rifle, which replaced the old SMLE rifles and the Vickers K machine gun, issued two per troop to provide fire support. To learn the characteristics of these new weapons, the commandos spent days on the rifle ranges learning how to handle them.

=== Normandy ===
Brigadier Lord Lovat, in command of the 1st Special Service Brigade, issued orders for the brigade's forthcoming role in the landings.

The Intention. The 6th Airborne Division and 1st Special Service Brigade would be responsible for holding the left flank of the Allied bridgehead of the invasion of Normandy.

The method. The Commando Brigade, consisting of No.s 3, 4 and 6 Army Commandos and No. 45 (Royal Marine) Commando, to land on the extreme flank of the Allied Forces on Queen beach (Sword) and cut inland to join forces with two brigades dropped inland by glider and parachute. No. 4 Commando to destroy a battery and the garrison in Ouistreham and then rejoin the Brigade. The rest of the Brigade, landing 30 minutes after No.4, to fight through enemy defences to reach and reinforce Brigades of the 6th Airborne Division, meeting astride the bridges spanning the River Orne and the Caen Canal. Glider Regiments of the Airlanding Brigade would arrive later the same evening descending in country cleared of the enemy.

On 25 May 1944, No. 4 Commando arrived in Southampton. They occupied a large marshalling area with tight security. Orders detailed their role in the invasion. "The two French troops would attack and destroy a strong point that dominated the beaches known as the Casino, followed by the five British fighting troops, supported by the heavy weapons troop, who were to push on further into the town to destroy a coastal battery." The German defenders in the area came from the 1st Battalion, 736th Infantry Regiment part of the 716th Infantry Division. They were responsible for the Casino strong point with its 7.5 centimetres (3.0 in) and 5.0 centimetres (2.0 in) guns, the coastal battery with its six 15.5 centimetres (6.1 in) guns and ten machine guns posts, stretching from the Orne canal along the seafront to Queen beach at La Breche, where the commando would be landing.

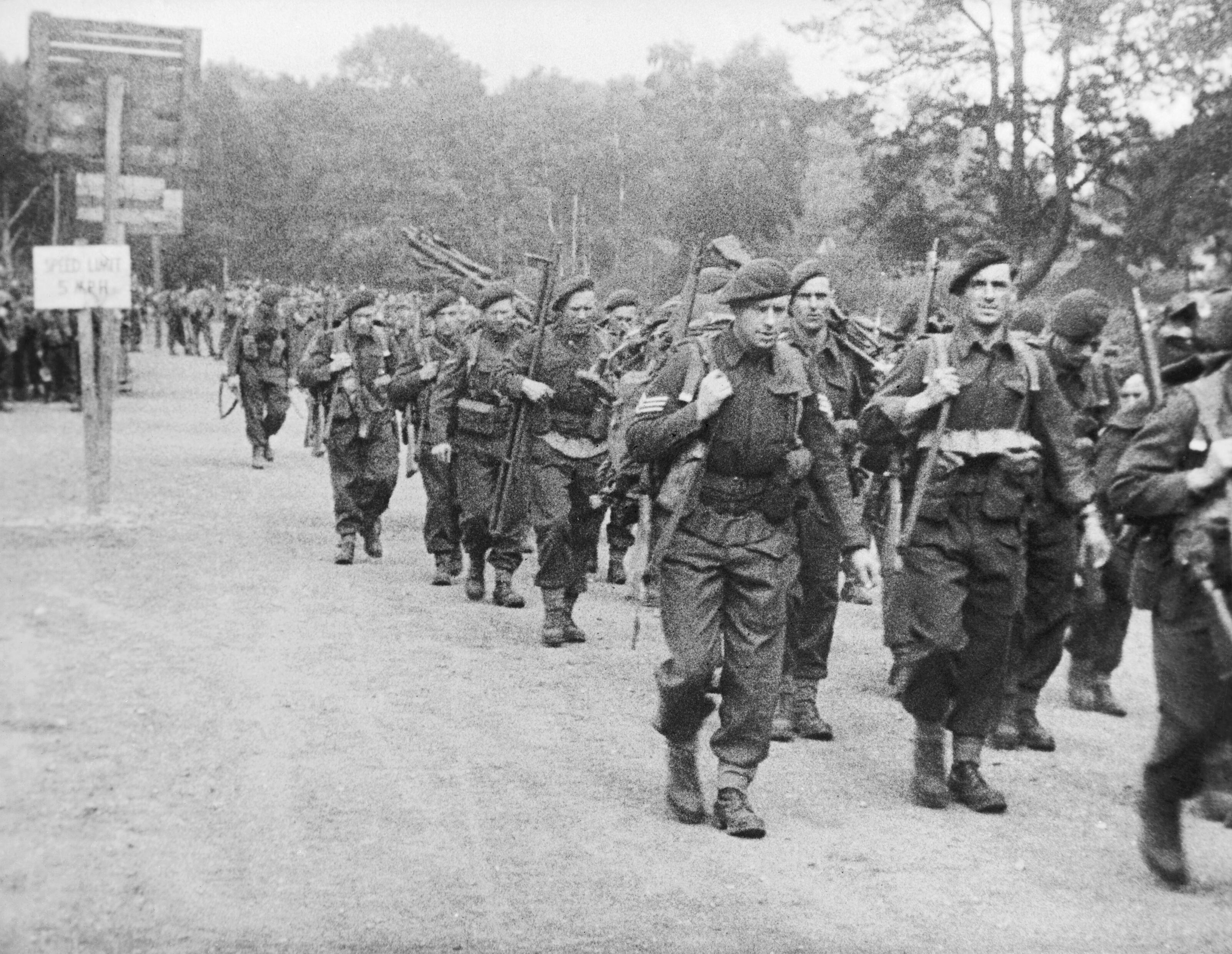
A film still showing men of No. 4 Commando, 1st Special Service Brigade, marching from their assembly camp to Southampton for embarkation to Normandy, June 1944.

The six British troops on board the Infantry Landing Ships, HMS Princess Astrid and HMS Maid of Orleans and the two French troops on LCIs 523 and 527 left the Solent on 5 June 1944. When out at sea they were informed that the invasion was going to be in Normandy and more specifically Ouistreham. For the landing each man carried a rucksack weighing 80 pounds (36 kg) containing extra ammunition, for the Brens, mortars, Vickers K guns and PIATs. This was on top of their own personal weapon and ammunition. Unusually each man chose whether to would wear a steel helmet or the Commando green beret. No. 4 Commando were in the second wave and landed behind the initial assault battalion, from the East Yorkshire Regiment, part of the 3rd Infantry Division. Captain Porteous described how their dead and wounded were "just swilling around in the water." Captain McDougal later wrote, "as we were coming ashore the assault troops were committing suicide by trying to dig in on the beach. In passing I kicked the nearest man telling him to keep going. The man was dead. So was the man next to him and a third was seriously wounded by machine gun fire." The Commandos followed their drills and cleared the beach as quickly as possible. Once clear they headed for their assembly area, which was also the commando medical post. Leaving their rucksacks behind, they set off along the Lion sur Mer road towards their objectives.

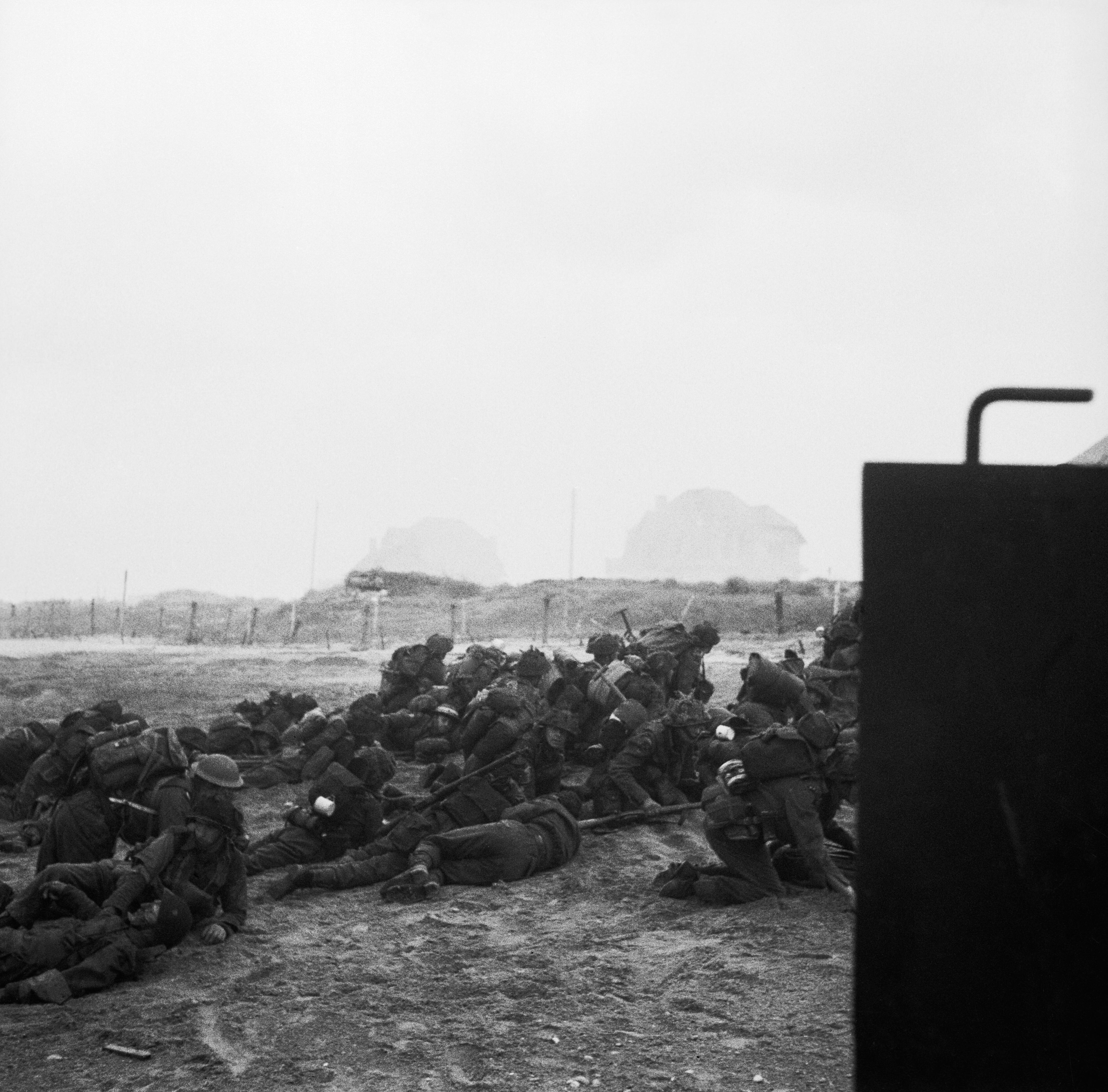
Dead and wounded infantry on Sword Beach, on the morning of 6 June 1944.

Lieutenant Colonel Dawson had decided that the two French troops should take the lead into Ouistreham, followed by the six British troops. The French were unopposed apart from some mortar rounds and machine gun fire as they neared their objective. No. 1 French Troop occupied houses at the front and sides of the Casino strong point. An assault to capture the Casino was driven back. While this was going on the other French troop, No. 8, approached the Casino from the rear. Taking up firing positions they too started to engage the strong point but their fire had almost no effect. The French commander Capitaine de frégate Philippe Kieffer was just about to order an all-out assault by both troops, when reports that British amphibious tanks were in Ouistreham reached him. Sending a guide to bring one forward, the tank arrived in front of the Casino and proceeded to destroy the German gun emplacements. Within 30 minutes of the tanks' arrival, all the strong point guns were silenced and No. 1 Troop had assaulted and captured the objective. With its capture the French Commandos were now in control of the western suburbs of Ouistreham.

The rest of No. 4 Commando was moving along the Lion sur Mer road towards their objective the gun battery. The battery was located at the extreme left of the landing beaches. The Orne canal formed its northern boundary and the Casino strong point was to the south. It was surrounded by barbed wire and had three machine gun posts. Two of the posts faced where the canal joined the sea and the third faced up the canal towards the port. To the west of the battery were the houses of the town and the port area of Ouistreham. The order of march was: C Troop to deal with any opposition en route, D Troop who were to force an entrance into the battery, A Troop to provide covering fire for the assaulting troops. In the assault E Troop would take the left hand guns, and F Troop the right. Bringing up the rear was the headquarters and the heavy weapons troop. The heavy weapons troop set up a fire base to support both the French and British attacks if needed. Progress along the road was rapid with only intermittent artillery fire slowing them down. As they advanced, a tank from the 13th/18th Royal Hussars joined them, just in time to engage German snipers who had started shooting at E and F Troops.

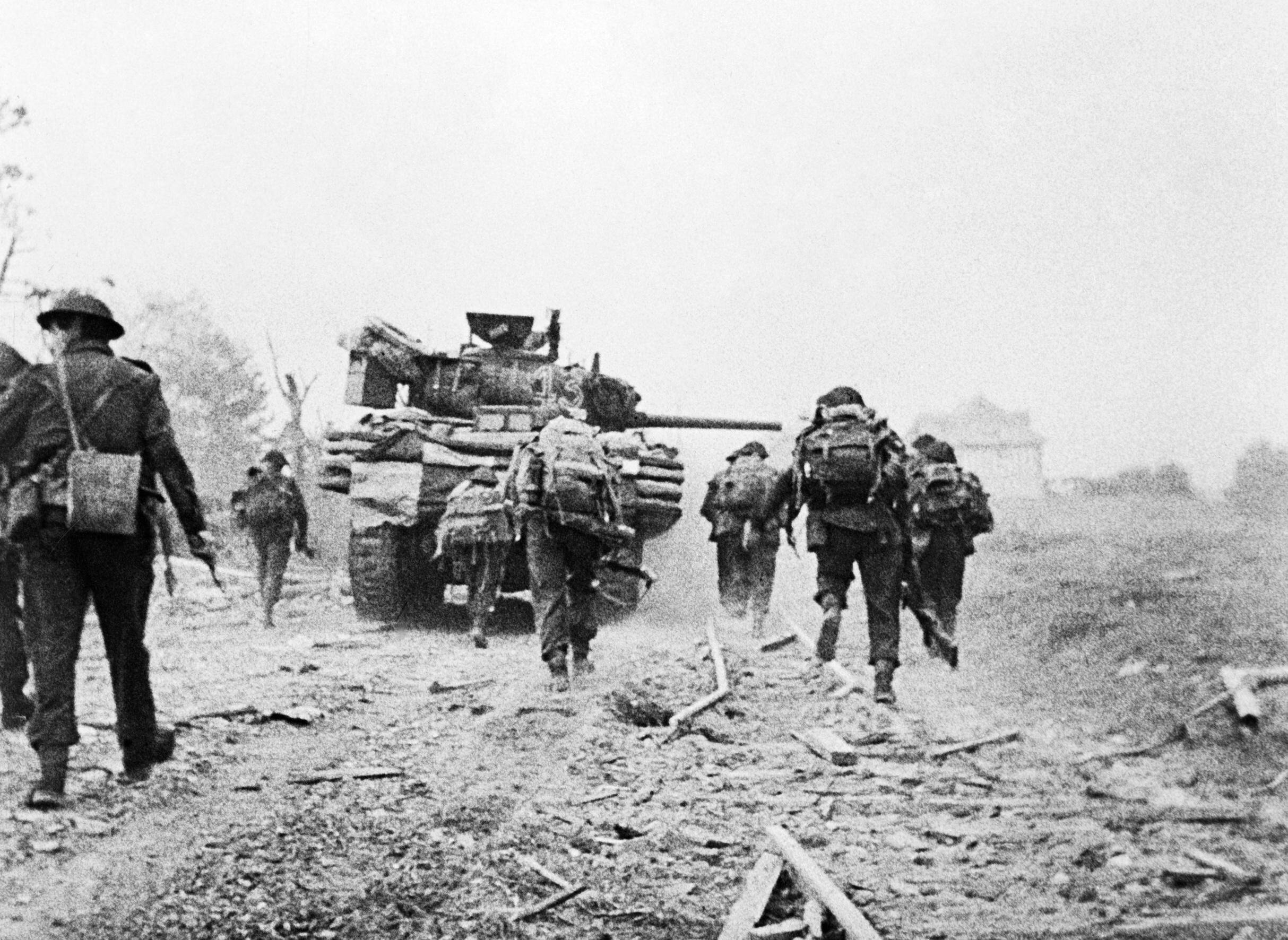
Sherman Duplex Drive tank of 'B' Squadron, 13th/18th Royal Hussars, and No. 4 Commando advancing towards Ouistreham.

As C Troop reached the forming up point for the assault it met heavy machine gun fire from the gun battery. A Troop bypassed them to occupy houses to cover the assault. The next to arrive was D Troop, which had a special ladder to cross the anti-tank ditch around the battery. Realising that the man carrying the ladder had been killed crossing the beach and the ladder left behind, they looked for another way to cross. They discovered wooden planks bridging the gap that the defenders used to access the town. D Troop crossed and captured the machine gun posts around the battery. With the machine guns taken, E and F Troops began their assault. The attack was successful but they discovered the guns were only wooden dummies made from telegraph poles. The real guns had been removed three days previously and positioned further inland.

Having captured its objectives, No. 4 Commando reformed and set out to join the rest of the brigade, about 6 miles (9.7 km) away. Lieutenant Colonel Dawson was wounded during the fighting and Major Menday temporarily took command. The march inland to the Orne bridges was uneventful and upon arrival No. 4 Commando dug in on a ridge of high ground to the east of the River Orne towards Sallenelles. Their new position was 2 miles (3.2 km) towards Sallenelles beside the Hauger château. Not long after they arrived and started digging in, the gliders of the 6th Airlanding Brigade began landing to their rear.

=== Orne bridgehead ===
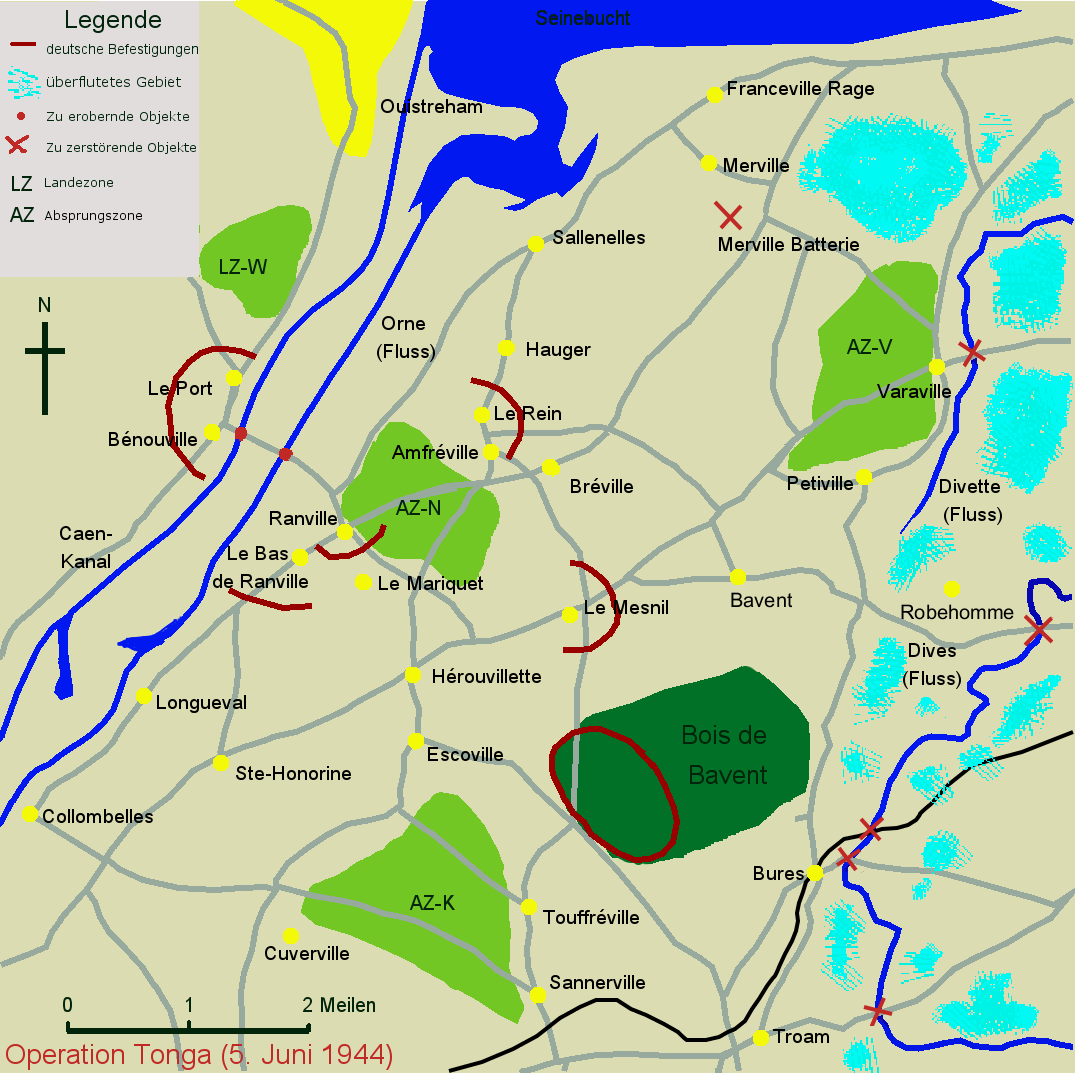
The Orne bridgehead

Expecting a Germans counterattack, protective trenches were completed by nightfall. The first night 6/7 June was uneventful and "stand to" was 04:30, but there were still no signs of a German attack. During the day there was some sniping in the morning and in the afternoon E and F Troop were subjected to a mortar barrage. By now the trenches were complete with overhead protection and arranged to give an all-round defence. In the French troops' area some activity was observed and Menday, still in command, suspected an attack from the direction of Sallenelles. Nothing come of that but in the evening of 7 June, some dive bombers strafed the brigade position. By the end of the second day there was still no signs of the expected German ground attack. That night was also uneventful but just after stand to on 8 June, German infantry were observed advancing through the woods to their front. Holding fire until the last minute, the Germans were beaten back but A Troop found themselves surrounded on three sides and forced to withdraw. That night the Germans attacked again, this time targeting C Troop, but were again driven back. Shortly thereafter a group from No. 45 (Royal Marine) Commando arrived and reported that the Germans had broken through and were on the road behind No. 4 Commando. Captain Porteous and D Troop moved down the road to deal with them. Outnumbered two to one D Troop charged, killing some and forcing the rest to withdraw.

The next morning 10 June, from 09:30 to 10;00 the No. 4 Commandos position was subjected to heavy artillery and mortar bombardment. For the two hours before this, No. 6 Commando was heavily bombed, which was followed up by a ground assault that lasted until midday. Suspecting an attack on their own position No. 4 Commando stood to. The attack did not materialise until 17:00, when massed German infantry were observed forming up in front of F Troop. At the same time an artillery Forward Observation Officer arrived from brigade, he contacted the 25 pounder guns attached to the 6th Airborne Division and requested 12 rounds of rapid fire. The rounds landed on target and another 12 were called for, breaking the German attack. The British artillery was not alone—since digging in, the Commandos had been on the receiving end of artillery and mortars which was steadily taking its toll in casualties. E Troop for example were now under the command of a section sergeant and had only 20 men left from a complement of 65.

Elsewhere the Germans were attacking A, C and the French troops. C Troop had ambushed the Germans, moving forward to attack and then fought off a second attack. The attack on the French position was supported by a tank, which they only managed to knock out with a PIAT after it had got behind them. In both these attacks the commandos were involved in hand-to-hand combat to keep the Germans from overrunning their positions. From 11 June the German pressure on the commando line lessened. They were still subject to artillery and mortar fire but there were no more infantry attempts to dislodge them. In the days since landing No. 4 Commando had taken 50 per cent casualties. Before the landings 1st Special Service brigade had been informed they would be withdrawn in a few days, after the Allies had broken out from the beachhead. Problems capturing Caen meant the commandos and airborne division had to remain to secure the left flank along the line of the Orne. They did not get relieved for 82 days, during which they not only held the left flank but on 18 August started their own break out. With No. 4 Commando leading the first village liberated was Bavent followed by Beaumont en Auge. Breuzville was entered over the night of 25/26 August and Boulleville the following day. Here they remained until 6 September when the brigade was withdrawn and sent back to Britain, for 14 days leave.

=== Walcheren ===
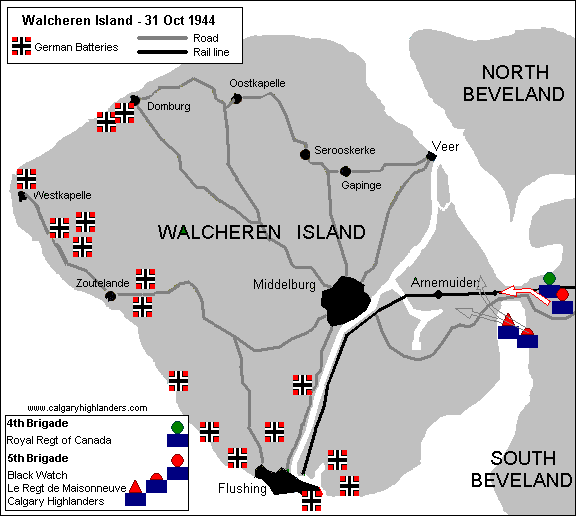
Walcheren showing the locations of the German gun batteries, the main towns and the Canadian units involved.

On their return from leave, No, 4 Commando had been made back up to full strength with casualty replacements. The commando were informed they would be joining the 4th Special Service Brigade to replace No. 46 (Royal Marine) Commando. Arriving in Belgium they discovered that the brigade was already well into training for Operation Infatuate. This was an assault landing on the island of Walcheren to open the sea route into Antwerp. The city had already been liberated but the northern bank of the Scheldt was still in German hands, enabling them to sink shipping trying to use the port. The First Canadian Army would attack across the causeway from the east. In support of them 4th Special Service Brigade would carry out an assault from the sea. The majority of the brigade would land at Westkapelle, No. 4 Commandos objective was further south at Flushing, with the 155th (South Scottish) Brigade landing behind them.

In preparation for the landing orders were issued to ensure everyone was fit and to concentrate on weapons firing and street fighting. The two French troops were still under command and just for this operation No. 4 Commando took command of a section from the Dutch Troop, No. 10 (Inter-Allied) Commando, and groups from the Special Boat Section (SBS), Royal Engineers and the Royal Artillery to call for artillery fire support. For some reason the old method of calling troops by letters of the alphabet was dropped and the troops were now numbered. The No.1 to No.4 Troops were British and No.s 5 and 6 French. The heavy weapons troop was No. 4 Troop. The final plan for the assault was for the SBS and a section from No. 1 Troop, to go first and reconnoitre a suitable landing point. Following them, the rest of No.1, No. 2 Troop and commando headquarters would secure the beachhead. They would then be joined by the remaining troops, passing through the beachhead and into the town. No.1 Troop would secure the left flank and No. 2 Troop the right.

The operation to liberate the island started at 04:45 1 November 1944, when No. 4 Commando left Breskens by LCAs for their objective the town of Flushing. On their way in and 60 minutes before they were expected to land a heavy artillery bombardment started. By 05:45 the SBS group landed beside the Oranje Molen windmill. They cleared the mines, other obstacles and dealt with the German guards without firing a shot. Then they marked the landing spot for the rest of the commando, No. 1 and No.2 Troops were the next to land. They extended the beachhead and captured machine gun posts and heavy gun emplacements. Another weapon captured was a 50 millimetres (2.0 in) anti-aircraft gun which supported the other troops when they moved into the town. The final wave landed at 06:30, but had to contend with heavy and accurate fire. One LCA carrying the heavy weapons troop was sunk containing most of their weapons and equipment. Once on the island No. 3 and No.5 Troop moved into the town held by the large numbers of Germans defending the area. No. 6 Troop captured the post office and 50 prisoners. In the afternoon No. 1 Troop was released to support No. 3 and together they advanced again before nightfall. No. 4 Commando had by then secured most of the old town and their flanks were secure.

The advance continued the next day. No. 5 Troop, unable to use the streets, advanced by mouse-holing - blowing holes in house walls with ready-made charges every man carried. No. 6 Troop had dug in and controlled the area between the old and new towns, which allowed the 155th (South Scottish) Brigade which was following up to bypass them. By that afternoon No. 4 Commando controlled the town.

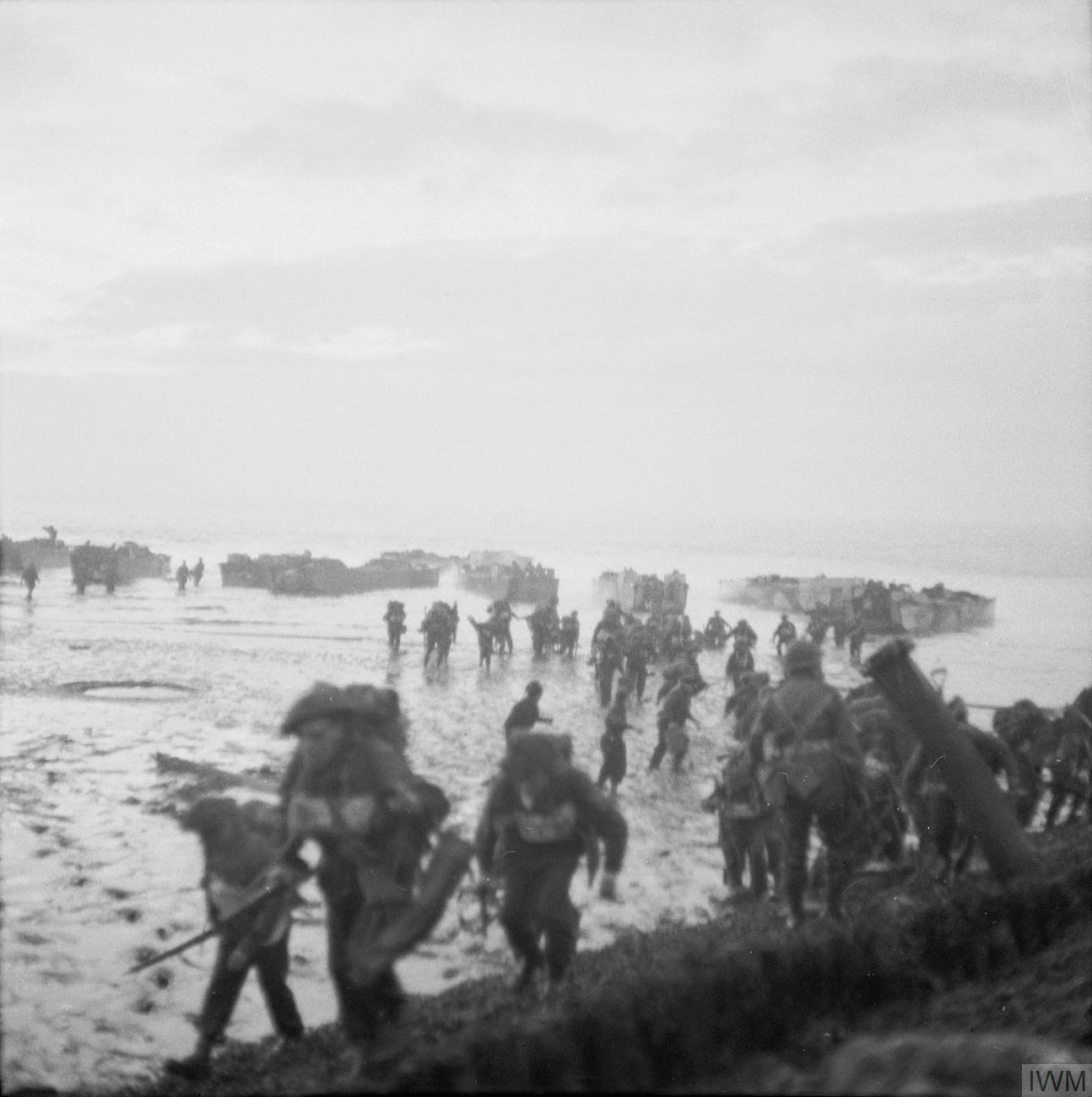
Wading ashore near Flushing

On 3 November the commandos gave control of Flushing to the 52nd (Lowland) Infantry Division and prepared to move by sea to support the rest of the brigade at Westkapelle. Before they could disembark, weather conditions deteriorated and they were forced to march around the coast to reach brigade headquarters at Zoutelande. Lack of supplies curtailed their involvement in the battle for the next two days. Supplies eventually caught up with them and on 6 November they prepared to continue. By now intelligence from Dutch residents and prisoners had revealed that the remaining Germans were holed up in the wooded area between Domburg and Vrouwenpolder.

At 04:45, 7 November No. 4 Commando were ready to start their assault, with No. 3 Troop on the left, the two French troops in the middle and No. 2 Troop on the right. The commandos moved forward, winning a number of small skirmishes, when at 08:15 three German officers appeared and offered the surrender of all the remaining German forces in the area. Lieutenant Colonel Dawson met with the German commander and a formal surrender was agreed and 900 prisoners were taken. Other Germans surrendered to some of the Royal Marine commandos at the same time. In the whole operation No. 4 Commando had suffered 13 dead, 21 wounded versus about 200 German dead and the capture of 1,200 prisoners and large amounts of weapons and equipment. The total casualties for 4th Special Service Brigade were 103 dead, 68 missing and 325 wounded.

=== Disbandment ===
No. 4 Commando remained at Walcheren until 14 November 1944, then moved to De Haan, Belgium, to rest and re-equip. They then moved to Blankenberge in Belgium where reinforcements arrived to bring them back up to full strength. They returned to Walcheren to defend the northern coastal areas. Of particular concern was the island of Schouwen-Duiveland, with an estimated garrison of 5,000 men and artillery. The objective was "to prevent enemy infiltration and sabotage". Lieutenant Colonel Dawson allocated stretches of the coast to each troop and taking the offensive to the enemy, started a programme of raids on Schouwen-Duiveland. At this stage of the war these raids were generally successful. Most patrols brought back prisoners and inflicted casualties on the German defenders. One raid was supposed to meet a party from the Dutch resistance that landed without being discovered, but was then disturbed by a German patrol who first fled rather than putting up any resistance. The commandos later learned that this Dutch resistance group had been captured by the German patrol and all its members were hanged the next morning.

In March 1945, No. 4 Commando was relieved by No. 47 (Royal Marine) Commando and moved to Middelburg and stayed at Bergen-Op-Zoom by April. While responsible for the security of the immediate area, they conducted small raids from the sea against South Holland. Germany surrendered on 8 May 1945. On the No. 4 Commando front the two French troops crossed the channel to Schouwen and Lieutenant Colonel Dawson accepted the unconditional surrender of all German forces in the region. Within days of the surrender No. 4 Commando moved to Recklinghausen in Germany as part of the occupation forces. In Recklinghausen part of their duties were to provide the guard force for a civilian internment camp. The camp housed several thousand German civilians who were not prisoners of war. Inmates included those with no identification and those known to have served in concentration camps. The two French troops returned to French control and were demobilised. Other men were posted to No.s 3 and 6 Commandos in Britain, who were preparing for a move to the Far East to continue the fight in the Burma campaign. By June 1945 the strength of No. 4 Commando had been reduced to 188 all ranks. During a visit in October 1945, Lieutenant General Robert Sturges informed them that the War Office had decided to disband all army commandos. Those not due to be demobilised would be returned to their parent regiment or corps. No. 4 Commando was formally disbanded in January 1946.

== Battle honours ==
In the British Army battle honours are awarded to regiments that have seen active service in a significant engagement or campaign, generally (although not always) one with a victorious outcome. The following battle honours were awarded to the British Commandos for service in the Second World War (** indicates where No. 4 Commando were present).

- Adriatic
- Alethangyaw
- Aller
- Anzio
- Argenta Gap
- Burma 1943–45
- Crete
- Dieppe **
- Dives Crossing **
- Djebel Choucha
- Flushing **
- Greece 1944–45
- Italy 1943–45
- Kangaw
- Landing at Porto San Venere
- Landing in Sicily
- Leese
- Litani
- Madagascar
- Middle East 1941, 1942, 1944
- Monte Ornito
- Myebon
- Normandy Landing **
- North Africa 1941–43
- North-West Europe 1942, 1944–1945 **
- Norway 1941 **
- Pursuit to Messina
- Rhine
- St. Nazaire **
- Salerno
- Sedjenane 1
- Sicily 1943
- Steamroller Farm
- Syria 1941
- Termoli
- Vaagso
- Valli di Comacchio
- Westkapelle **

== Notes ==
Footnotes

Citations
