= Operation Chopper =

Operation Chopper may refer to:

- Operation Chopper (World War II), a British Commando raid in the Second World War
- Operation Chopper (Vietnam War), a United States operation in the Vietnam War
