= Special Service Brigade =

Formation of the British Army in WWII

The Special Service Brigade was a formation of the British Army during the Second World War. It was formed in 1940, after the call for volunteers for Special Service who eventually became the British Commandos.

== Background ==
In 1940, volunteers were called for from serving British Army soldiers within certain formations still in Britain and men of the disbanding Divisional Independent Companies originally raised from Territorial Army (TA) divisions and who had seen service in the Norwegian Campaign. In November 1940 these army units were organised into a Special Service Brigade under Brigadier J. C. Haydon with five Special Service battalions. By the autumn of 1940 more than 2,000 men had volunteered for commando training, and the Special Service Brigade now consisted of 12 units which were now called commandos. Each commando would number around 450 men, commanded by a lieutenant-colonel. They were divided into troops of 75 men and further divided into 15-man sections. The Commandos were all volunteers, seconded from other British Army regiments, but they retained their own regimental cap badges and remained on their regimental roll for pay.

=== Formation ===
The Special Service Brigade consisted of five Special Service battalions, numbered one to five. These Special Service battalions were eventually renamed commandos. The No. 1 Special Service Battalion became No. 1 and No. 2 Commandos. The No. 2 Special Service Battalion became No. 9 Commando. The No. 3 Special Service Battalion became No. 4 Commando. The No. 4 Special Service Battalion became No. 3 Commando. The No. 5 Special Service Battalion became No. 5 and No. 6 Commandos.

== Commando brigades ==
In 1943 the commandos started to move away from smaller raiding operations. They had been formed into brigades of assault infantry to spearhead future Allied landing operations. Of the remaining 20 Commandos, 17 were used in the formation of the four Special Service brigades. The three remaining units No. 12, No. 14 (Arctic) and No. 62 Commandos were left to carry out smaller-scale raids. But by the end of the year these three commandos had all been disbanded, to supply replacements for the other commando units.

The formation of the brigades was:

- 1st Special Service Brigade with No. 3, No. 4, No. 6 and No.45 (RM) Commandos.
- 2nd Special Service Brigade with No. 2, No. 9, No. 40 (RM) and No. 43 (RM) Commandos.
- 3rd Special Service Brigade with No. 1, No. 5, No. 42 (RM) and No. 44 (RM) Commandos.
- 4th Special Service Brigade with No. 10 (Inter-Allied), No. 41 (RM), No. 46 (RM), No. 47 (RM) and No. 48 (RM) Commandos.

The previous Special Service Brigade Headquarters was replaced by Headquarters Special Services Group under Major-General Robert Sturges. The four brigades were destined to serve in different theatres of war. The 1st and 4th brigades were based in the United Kingdom and destined for service in North-western Europe. The 2nd Brigade was based in the Mediterranean for service in Italy and the Balkans. The 3rd Brigade was based in India for service in Burma and the Pacific.
