= No. 5 Commando =

- Active: 1940–1947
- Country: United Kingdom
- Branch: British Army
- Type: Commando
- Role: Amphibious warfare; Close-quarters combat; Coastal raiding; Direct action; Jungle warfare; Raiding; Reconnaissance
- Size: Battalion
- Part of: 3rd Commando Brigade
- Engagements: Second World War: Operation Acid Drop; Battle of Madagascar; Burma 1944–45; Battle of Maungdaw; Battle of Kangaw

Insignia
- Combined Operations Shoulder Patch

No. 5 Commando was a battalion-sized commando unit of the British Army during the Second World War.

Formed in July 1940, the unit took part in a couple of small-scale raids in France in 1941 and contributed some personnel to Operation Chariot before taking part in the landings on Madagascar in 1942. In late 1943 it was sent to India with the rest of the 3rd Special Service Brigade and subsequently took part in operations in Burma throughout 1944 and 1945.

Following the end of the war the unit undertook occupation duties in Hong Kong where they were amalgamated with No. 1 Commando on 23 March 1946 to form 1/5 Commando before eventually being disbanded in February 1947.

== Background ==
The commandos were formed in 1940, by the order of Winston Churchill the British Prime Minister. He called for specially trained troops that would "develop a reign of terror down the enemy coast". At first they were a small force of volunteers who carried out small raids against enemy-occupied territory, but by 1943 their role had changed into lightly equipped assault infantry which specialised in spearheading amphibious landings.

The man initially selected as the overall commander of the force was Admiral Sir Roger Keyes, himself a veteran of the landings at Galipoli and the Zeebrugge raid in the First World War. Keyes resigned in October 1941 and was replaced by Admiral Louis Mountbatten.

By the autumn of 1940 more than 2,000 men had volunteered for commando training, and what became known as the Special Service Brigade was formed into 12 units called commandos. Each commando would number around 450 men commanded by a lieutenant colonel. They were sub divided into troops of 75 men and further divided into 15-man sections. Commandos were all volunteers seconded from other British Army regiments and retained their own cap badges and remained on their regimental roll for pay. All volunteers went through the six-week intensive commando course at Achnacarry. The course in the Scottish Highlands concentrated on fitness, speed marches, weapons training, map reading, climbing, small boat operations and demolitions both by day and by night.

By 1943 the commandos had moved away from small raiding operations and had been formed in brigades of assault infantry to spearhead future Allied landing operations. Three units were left un-brigaded to carry out smaller-scale raids.

== No. 5 Commando ==
It was initially formed at Bridlington 23 July 1940 from volunteers for special service from units in Western Command. In October, when the commandos were reorganised into "Special Service" Battalions, No. 5 Commando was amalgamated with No. 6 Commando becoming a company-sized element in the 5th Special Service Battalion under Lieutenant Colonel Timothy Fetherstonhaugh, based at Helensburgh in Scotland. In March 1941, the battalion was broken up again into its constituent parts and No. 5 Commando was re-raised under Lieutenant Colonel William Sanguinetti on 26 February 1941, (Note: William Scurfield Swire Sanguinetti.) formerly of the Hampshire Regiment. They also moved to Barrhead and then Falmouth.

=== Early raids ===
No. 5 Commando's first operations were undertaken on the night of 30–31 August 1941, when two parties of fifteen men carried out landings near Hardelot and Merlimont in France as part of Operation Acid Drop. The objectives of the raids were to generally harass the garrison and to carry out reconnaissance and gather intelligence. In the end, however, they spent only half an hour ashore and failed to make contact with the defenders before re-embarking on their landing craft.

Later, in March 1942, No. 5 Commando provided a troop of demolition experts to take part in Operation Chariot, the raid on St. Nazaire. These men were attached to the force under Lieutenant Colonel Charles Newman, who was the commanding officer of No. 2 Commando, which provided the main assault force for the raid. Involving the ramming of a destroyer, HMS Campbeltown into the gates of the drydock at St. Nazaire in France in order to prevent it being used as a base for the Tirpitz, the raid was later described as the "greatest raid of all".

=== Madagascar ===
In early 1942, the British began an operation to seize the island of Madagascar in the Indian Ocean. Due to heavy German U-boat and aerial activity in the Mediterranean the main shipping route to India at the time was around the Cape and there were concerns following the advance of the Japanese throughout southeast Asia, that if the Japanese were able to capture the port at Antsirane and the anchorage in Diego Suarez bay then they would be able to disrupt the sea lanes of communication between Britain and the subcontinent.

Following the British attack on the French fleet at Mers-el-Kebir a pro-Vichy government had been installed on the island, and the British concern about the island being occupied by the Axis grew. As a result, on 5 May 1942, an amphibious force consisting of three infantry brigade-groups with naval and air support undertook Operation Ironclad. (Note: The 29th Brigade was independent brigade group for this operation, while the 5th Division consisted of the 13th and 17th Brigade Groups.) For this operation, No. 5 Commando, numbering some 365 men under the command of Lieutenant Colonel W. Sanguinetti, was attached to the 29th Brigade and landing ahead of the main force near Courrier and Ambarata Bays on the northern tip of the island and roughly 11 miles (18 km) to the west of Diego Suarez, they carried out a raid on a French coastal artillery battery.

It was the first major amphibious operation carried out by Allied forces in the war. At dawn on 5 May, after the transport vessels and their escorts had managed to slip through a stretch of water previously thought impassable due to the presence of reefs, the commandos embarked upon assault landing craft and proceeded to their landing beach down a channel that had been swept clear of mines by a small force of corvettes. Landing at the base of a 50 feet (15 m) cliff, which they then proceeded to scale, they achieved complete surprise over the French officers and colonial troops manning the two guns. At dawn they were counter-attacked by a platoon-sized element of French colonial troops against which the commandos carried out a bayonet charge, targeting the non-commissioned officers leading the attack and after they had been killed the remaining defenders laid down their weapons and surrendered. The commando casualties were described as being only "very light" in the brief engagement.

For the next two days, the commandos continued operations around Cap Diego as the main force, having landed at Ambararata, drove towards the port of Antsirane, attempting to take it from the rear—on the opposite headland across the channel from Cap Diego, to the south—capturing Fort Bellevue and the airfield in the process. As part of these operations the commandos marched 18 miles (29 km) from where they had landed at Courrier Bay across the isthmus that separated the Cap D'Ambre from the larger land mass to the south, and moved to Cap Diego where they carried out mopping up operations and were briefly engaged with a French Foreign Legion troop and in the battle that followed about 50 legionnaires were wounded.

On 8 May 1942, following an amphibious assault by Royal Marines which were landed from the destroyer HMS Anthony, Antsirane fell and the anchorage captured; the Vichy French forces, however, continued to resist, and having withdrawn to the south, a prolonged land campaign began, although hostilities remained at relative low-intensity level, consisting mainly of delaying tactics on the part of the French.

No. 5 Commando then went briefly to Mombassa where they carried out rehearsals for the next phase of the campaign which, for the commandos, came on 10 September 1942 when they carried out a landing at Majunga, which was another port on the western coast of the island. The plan called for a dawn landing at the docks, but after some of the landing craft broke down they were delayed and the landings took place later in the day without the cover of darkness. As the defending French colonial forces opened up on the landing craft with four machine guns, the support vessels fired on the shore in an effort to provide cover to the assaulting troops, which took a number of casualties as they stormed the quayside. Once ashore, the commandos took control of the local post office, severing communications with Tannanarive, before storming the Governor's Residence and raising the Union Jack.

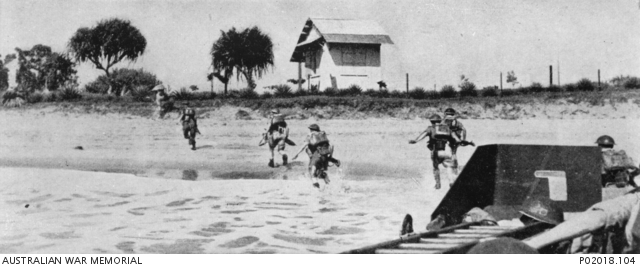
British troops landing from a Landing Craft Assault at Tamatave, 1942

Later they returned to the anchorage at Antsirane and embarked upon the destroyers HMS Arrow, Active and Blackmore. Escorted a naval force consisting of the battleship HMS Warspite, the aircraft carrier Illustrious as well as three cruisers and 14 destroyers, they took part in a landing at Tamatave, where the garrison surrendered after a heavy naval bombardment, before beginning the advance on Tannanarive, in conjunction with troops from the King's African Rifles who struck out from Majunga. On 18 September, after the French rejected a proposal for an armistice, they took part in another landing, this time at Ambalavo. In October, before the fighting ended—the French finally surrendered on 5 November 1942—the commandos embarked for the United Kingdom, arriving there in December.

Although in the end they were involved in only limited combat, the experience that the commandos gained from this proved valuable later on when they were deployed to the Far East to fight against the Japanese.

=== India and Burma ===
==== 1943–44 ====
By 1943 the commando concept had evolved from the original purpose of small-scale raiding and a re-organisation was undertaken in which the units were organised into formed brigades with administrative, transport and other support elements being inserted into the formations, which became part the divisional-sized Special Service Group headquarters under the command of Major General Robert Sturges. (Note: The Special Service Group, and the individual brigades, were later renamed to replace the title Special Service with Commando. This organisation was responsible for administering all the commando units in the United Kingdom (later Europe), Italy, and the Far East. Laffin 1999, p. 18.) As a result of this, now commanded by Lieutenant Colonel D.M Shaw, No. 5 Commando became part of the 3rd Special Service Brigade under the command of Brigadier Wilfred Nonweiler, (Note: Wilfred Ivan Nonweiler, later major general.) along with Nos. 1, 42 (Royal Marine), and 44 (Royal Marine) Commandos.

In November 1943 the brigade embarked for overseas and after a five-week voyage No. 5 Commando, as well as No. 44 (Royal Marine) Commando, arrived in Bombay, India on 19 December 1943 where they became part of Mountbatten's South East Asia Command, which had been set up earlier in the year. (Note: No. 1 and 42 (Royal Marine) Commandos were diverted en route, after their ship was bombed and they were forced to put into Alexandria while repairs were undertaken. As a result, only half the brigade took part in the initial fighting it undertook, and it was not until September 1944 that all the units were together again. Saunders 1959, p. 304.) They moved by rail from Bombay to Poona where they took up residence at Kedgaon and undertook amphibious landing practice at the Combined Training Centre that had been established at Lake Kharakvasla.

In late February 1944, after the Japanese launched a counter-offensive against the Indian 5th Infantry Division in the Arakan, both No. 5 and No. 44 (Royal Marine) Commandos were moved back to Bombay and embarking on HMS Keren they were sent to Cox's Bazar. They arrived there on 5 March, by which time the British and Indian units in Burma had managed to stop the Japanese counter-offensive and had themselves resumed offensive operations. As Indian XV Corps cleared the Maungdaw–Buthidaung road, the commandos landed behind the Japanese near Alethangaw on 11 March 1944. For a couple of weeks they carried out patrols in the Japanese rear before being recalled to Maungdaw on 23 March, where No. 5 Commando carried out a number of attacks on key terrain.

In April, after the Japanese launched Operation U-Go—the invasion of India through northern Burma and Assam—No. 5 Commando were withdrawn from Maungdaw and moved to Silchar, which was an important communications and logistics hub in southern Assam. For four months they were stationed there, carrying out long-range patrols into the surrounding hills and waiting for the Japanese to arrive. They never made it that far, having been defeated around Imphal and Kohima.

After this a brief period of leave followed before the commandos were moved to Trincomalee in Ceylon, where they joined the rest of the brigade—No. 1 and 42 (Royal Marine) Commandos.

==== 1944–45 ====
They did not remain in Trincomalee for very long, however, for in September the brigade, now renamed 3rd Commando Brigade, was moved to Ramu, near Teknaf in present-day Bangladesh, where they were joined by members of the Special Boat Squadron and began preparing for further operations. Attached to the 25th Indian Infantry Division, throughout November they undertook a number of patrols to islands in the area. In this time, No. 5 Commando was only involved in one such patrol, while the other commandos were more heavily committed, gathering intelligence and carrying out reconnaissance.

In late December 1944 XV Corps, under Lieutenant General Philip Christison, went on the offensive and on 29 December the 3rd Commando Brigade, then commanded by Brigadier Campbell Hardy, (Note: Sir Campbell Richard Hardy, later Commandant-General of the Royal Marines.) carried out an unopposed landing on the island of Akyab. Following this reconnaissance operations were undertaken around the Myebon Peninsula and on the surrounding islands. During one of these patrols, a group of commandos from No. 5 Commando had a brief contact with a Japanese force during which they killed four of them without suffering loss themselves.

On 12 January 1945, the commando brigade carried out a landing on the peninsula. Coming ashore in the second wave behind No. 42 (Royal Marine) Commando, No. 5 Commando carried the advance inland until they came under machine gun fire from a hill that had been named 'Rose' by the planning staff. The following morning, after air support was called in and tanks from the 19th Lancers were came up, No. 5 Commando launched an attack on the position. In the end the attack was successful and as a result of the defenders deciding to fight to the death, no prisoners were taken.

For the next couple of days No. 5 Commando carried out patrols throughout the peninsula as the enemy were cleared from the area, before they were withdrawn back to the beachhead for a couple of days rest. After this the brigade captured the village of Kantha as a preliminary move on Kangow, across a number of waterways on the mainland, where Christison had decided that he wanted to cut the Japanese line of withdrawal. The terrain was difficult with no roads and consisting of mangrove swamps and rice paddies that prevented tanks or artillery coming ashore initially. The whole area was dominated by a small wooded ridge known as Hill 170.

Nevertheless, on 22 January a landing took place, spearheaded by No. 1 Commando, and over the course of the next week or so they and the rest of the brigade were involved in heavy fighting around Hill 170 and the surrounding areas, before finally being relieved on 1 February 1945. During this time No. 5 Commando was placed under the operational command of the 51st Indian Brigade and took part in a number of attacks around positions known as Milford and Pinner, before participating in the final stages of No. 1 Commando's defence of Hill 170, when two troops from the commando reinforced the defenders on 31 January and then took part in beating off the final attack on the following morning. (Note: Throughout the battle the commandos suffered 45 killed and 90 wounded and it was during this fighting that Lieutenant George Knowland, from No. 1 Commando, performed the actions that resulted in him receiving the Victoria Cross posthumously. Saunders 1959, p. 314.)

After this No. 5 Commando and the rest of the 3rd Commando Brigade moved back to Akyab, before embarking for Madras where, after a brief period of leave, they moved to Lake Kharakvasla again to begin training for Operation Zipper, the invasion of Malaya. In the end this operation did not eventuate, as war ended before it could be undertaken.

=== Disbandment ===
Following the end of the war, No. 5 Commando undertook garrison duties in Hong Kong. As the demobilisation process occurred, the unit's numbers began to dwindle and it was amalgamated with No. 1 Commando. In 1946 the decision was made to disband the Army commandos and subsequently the 3rd Commando Brigade became a formation of the Royal Marines, which continues to exist today.

As a result, No. 1/5 Commando was disbanded in February 1947.

== Battle honours ==
The following Battle honours were awarded to the British Commandos during the Second World War:

- Adriatic
- Alethangyaw
- Aller
- Anzio
- Argenta Gap
- Burma 1943–45
- Crete
- Dieppe
- Dives Crossing
- Djebel Choucha
- Flushing
- Greece 1944–45
- Italy 1943–45
- Kangaw
- Landing at Porto San Venere
- Landing in Sicily
- Leese
- Litani
- Madagascar
- Middle East 1941, 1942, 1944
- Monte Ornito
- Myebon
- Normandy Landing
- North Africa 1941–43
- North-West Europe 1942, 1944–1945
- Norway 1941
- Pursuit to Messina
- Rhine
- St. Nazaire
- Salerno
- Sedjenane 1
- Sicily 1943
- Steamroller Farm
- Syria 1941
- Termoli
- Vaagso
- Valli di Comacchio
- Westkapelle

== Notes ==
Footnotes

Citations
