= No. 44 (Royal Marine) Commando =

British battalion during World War II

- Cap Badge of the Royal Marines
- Active: 1 August 1943–1946 when renumbered 40 Commando
- Country: United Kingdom
- Branch: Royal Marines
- Type: Commando
- Role: Amphibious warfare Close-quarters combat Coastal raiding Direct action Jungle warfare Raiding; Reconnaissance
- Size: One battalion
- Part of: 3rd Special Service Brigade
- Nickname: Four Four
- Motto: Per Mare Per Terram (By Sea By Land) (Latin)
- March: Quick - A Life on the Ocean Wave; Slow - Preobrajensky

Commanders
- Notable commanders: Lieutenant Colonel FC Horton

No. 44 (Royal Marine) Commando was a battalion size formation in the British Commandos, formed during the Second World War. The Commando was assigned to the 3rd Special Service Brigade and served in the Burma Campaign.

== Background ==
The British Commandos were formed in 1940, by the order of Winston Churchill the British Prime Minister. He called for specially trained troops that would "develop a reign of terror down the enemy coast". At first they were a small force of volunteers who carried out small raids against enemy occupied territory, but by 1943 their role had changed into lightly equipped assault Infantry which specialised in spearheading amphibious landings.

The man selected as the overall commander of the force was Admiral Sir Roger Keyes himself a veteran of the landings at Galipoli and the Zeebrugge raid in the First World War. Initially the Commandos were a British Army formation the first Royal Marine Commando was formed in 1942. The Royal Marine Commandos like all British Commandos went through the six-week intensive commando course at Achnacarry. The course in the Scottish Highlands concentrated on fitness, speed marches, weapons training, map reading, climbing, small boat operations and demolitions both by day and by night. No. 44 (Royal Marine) Commando was formed on 1 August 1943, under the command of Lieutenant Colonel F C Horton and consisted of seven Troops just over 400 men. Each Troop consisted of three officers and 62 men in a small headquarters and two sections. In 1943 the commando formation was also standardised, into a small headquarters, five fighting Troops, a Heavy Weapons troop and a signals platoon. The fighting Troops consisted of 65 all ranks divided into two 30 man sections which in turn were divided into three ten man sub sections. The Heavy Weapons Troop was made up of 3 inch Mortar and Vickers machine gun teams.

No.44 (Royal Marine) Commando was raised in August 1943, from the 3rd Royal Marine Battalion under command of Lieutenant Colonel F C Horton. It served in the Far East with the 3rd Special Service Brigade. It took part in the Burma Campaign and was located in the Arakan during the Japanese U-Go Offensive, before carrying out a number of raids along the Burmese coastline. During the 1944–45 third Arakan offensive it took part in the landings at Myebon and the battle of Hill 170. It was then withdrawn to India to prepare for the invasion of Malaya Operation Zipper. The war ended before the operation began and the commando was diverted to reoccupy Hong Kong.

== Operations ==
=== Second World War ===
Early Commando units were all from the British Army but by February 1942, the Royal Marines were asked to organise Commando units of their own, and 6,000 men volunteered.

In November 1943 No. 44 (Royal Marine) Commando was assigned to the 3rd Special Service Brigade and sailed for the Far East and saw action against the Japanese in the Burma Campaign. The other units in the brigade were No. 1 Commando, No. 5 Commando and No. 42 (Royal Marine) Commando. No. 44 and No.5 Commandos arrived in the theatre together as No. 1 and No. 42 were delayed in Ceylon by transportation problems. The commando spent some time at Cox's Bazar acclimatising before becoming operational. On 5 March 1944 No. 44 set up their base at Nhila on the Teknaf peninsula.

Later the same month No. 44 took part in their first operations against the Japanese. These were two missions codenamed Operation Screwdriver. Their first operation 11 March was a landing from the sea at Alethangyaw their objective was to capture the town for the rest of the brigade to pass through into the surrounding hills to engage the enemy. The landing was met in force by machine gun emplacements and sniper fire and for the next 48 hours the Commando had a series of running battles with the Japanese and carried out a reconnaissance of the surrounding hills. The mission claimed 40–50 Japanese dead for the loss of four commandos missing believed dead. Their second mission was crossing the Naf River by barge on 21 March with the objective of raiding Nahkaungdo, Lambaguna and Hinthaya. The operation, during which the unit chaplain, the Revd Harold Manger RNVR, was killed in action, was a success: following a number of small skirmishes the Japanese were forced to bring up reinforcements and the Commando was withdrawn.

=== 1945 ===
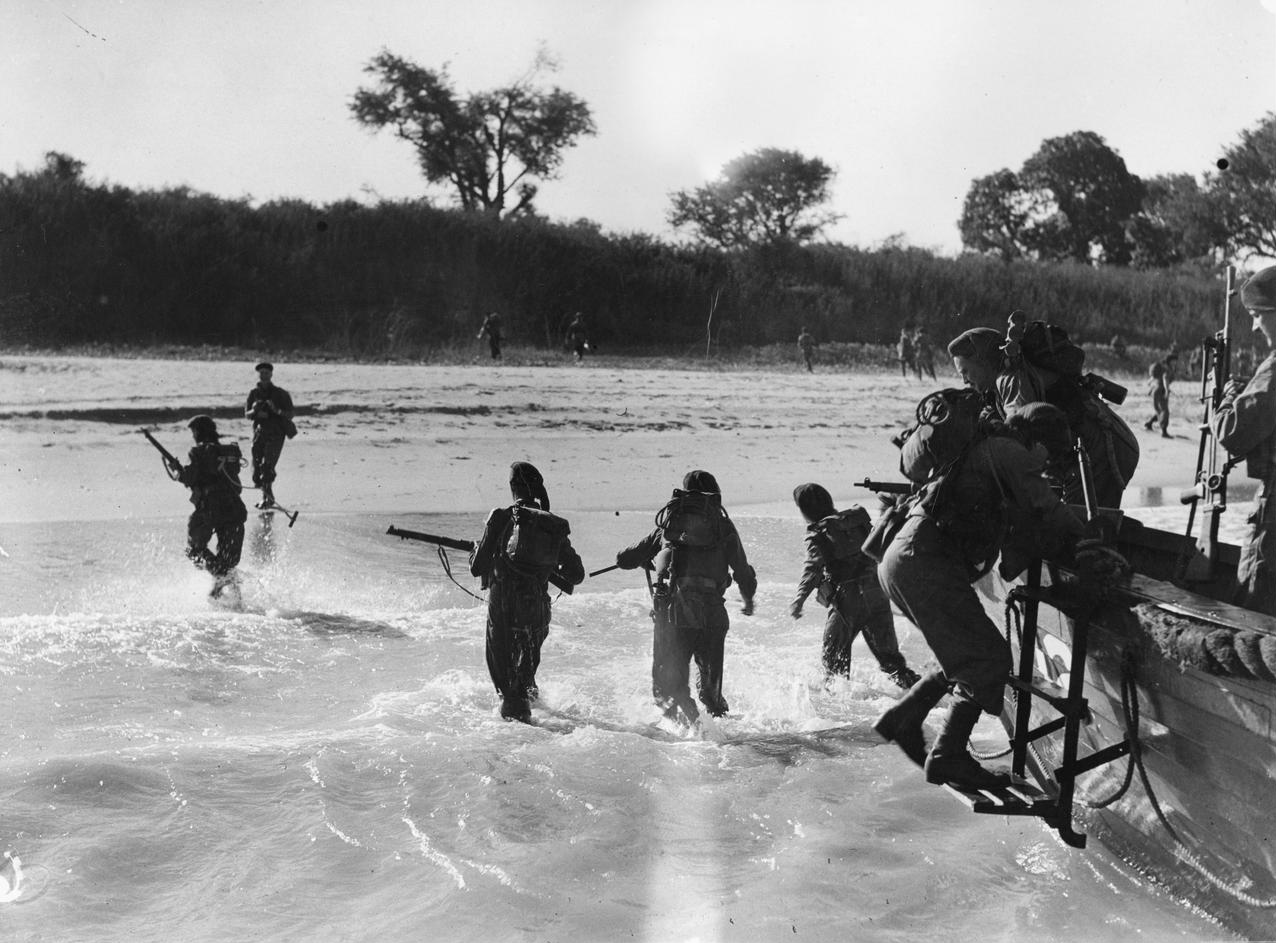
Royal Marines landing on Ramree Island

On 3 January No. 44 were involved in a full scale amphibious landing with the rest of the brigade and a tank squadron in Operation Lightning at Akyab. The landings started at 12:30 hours and were completed by 13:50 hours. When they reached the town of Akyab they discovered the Japanese had withdrawn and there was no trace on the island of the supposed garrison of three battalions. By the end of the month they were involved in the battle of Hill 170 this was one of the most intense battles of the whole Burma campaign. In March 1945 the Commando was withdrawn back to India for to prepare for Operation Zipper, the planned invasion of Malaya. The war ended before the Zipper landing could take place and No. 44 was sent to liberate Hong Kong instead.

== Legacy ==
No. 44 (Royal Marine) Commando was renumbered 40 Commando when the 2nd Commando Brigade and its commando units including the then No. 40 (Royal Marine) Commando were disbanded. After the Second World War all the British Army Commandos were disbanded and the commando role was taken over by the Royal Marines. However the present day Parachute Regiment, Special Air Service and Special Boat Service can all trace their origins to the Commandos.

== Battle honours ==
The following Battle honours were awarded to the British Commandos during the Second World War.

- Adriatic
- Alethangyaw
- Aller
- Anzio
- Argenta Gap
- Burma 1943–45
- Crete
- Dieppe
- Dives Crossing
- Djebel Choucha
- Flushing
- Greece 1944–45
- Italy 1943–45
- Kangaw
- Landing at Porto San Venere
- Landing in Sicily
- Leese
- Litani
- Madagascar
- Middle East 1941, 1942, 1944
- Monte Ornito
- Myebon
- Normandy Landing
- North Africa 1941–43
- North-West Europe 1942, 1944–1945
- Norway 1941
- Pursuit to Messina
- Rhine
- St. Nazaire
- Salerno
- Sedjenane 1
- Sicily 1943
- Steamroller Farm
- Syria 1941
- Termoli
- Vaagso
- Valli di Comacchio
- Westkapelle
