= Operation Acid Drop =

Coordinates: 50.622°N 1.601°E

Operation Acid Drop was a British Commando raid during World War II. It was the first commando raid carried out by No. 5 Commando and consisted of two simultaneous operations over the night of 30/31 August 1941. Each raid consisted of one officer and 14 men, their targets being the beaches at Neufchâtel-Hardelot and Merlimont in the Pas-de-Calais, France with the aim of carrying out reconnaissance and if possible, capturing a German soldier. It was a hit-and-run type raid with only 30 minutes ashore, but neither party encountered any Germans during the event.
