= Operation Deep Cut =

British Commandos during the Second World War

Operation Deep Cut was a raid by British Commandos during the Second World War. It was carried out by No. 1 Section of 5 Troop No. 1 Commando at Saint-Vaast-la-Hougue east of Cherbourg in September 1941.

5 Troop were split up into two sections. No 1 Section commanded by Lieutenant Scaramanga landed as planned at Saint Vaast Bay where they encountered a German bicycle patrol, which they shot up. However the Germans did manage to return fire and wounded two men.
