= George Arthur Knowland =

Recipient of the Victoria Cross (1922–1945)

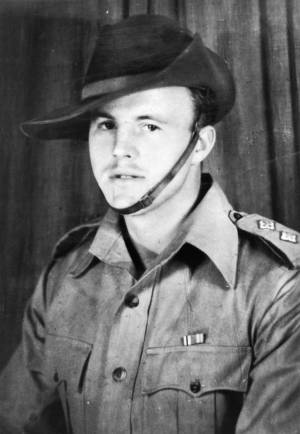
- Born: 16 August 1922; Catford, London
- Died: 31 January 1945 (aged 22); Hill 170, Arakan, Burma
- Burial place: Taukkyan War Cemetery, Burma
- Military career
- Allegiance: United Kingdom
- Branch: British Army
- Service years: 1940–1945
- Rank: Lieutenant
- Service number: 323566
- Units: Royal Norfolk Regiment; No. 1 Commando
- Conflicts: World War II: Pacific War; Burma campaign; Burma campaign 1945; Battle of Hill 170 (DOW)
- Awards: Victoria Cross

Lieutenant George Arthur Knowland VC (16 August 1922 – 31 January 1945) was an English recipient of the Victoria Cross during the Second World War, the highest and most prestigious award for gallantry in the face of the enemy that can be awarded to British and Commonwealth forces.

Knowland was born on 16 August 1922 in Catford, Kent and attended Elmwood Primary School in Croydon. He joined the Royal Norfolk Regiment of the British Army, in 1940, as a private. He later joined No.3 Commando serving with them in Sicily and Italy, before being commissioned in 1944.

At 22 years old, and a lieutenant in the Royal Norfolks but now attached to No. 1 Commando in Burma, he took part in the Battle of Hill 170 where he was to earn the VC.

On 31 January 1945 near Kangaw, Burma, Lieutenant Knowland was in command of a forward platoon of a troop which was being heavily attacked – some 300 of the enemy concentrating on his 24 men. During the attacks he moved among the men distributing ammunition and contributing with rifle fire and throwing grenades at the enemy. When the crew of one of his forward Bren light machine guns had been wounded, he rushed forward to man it himself. The enemy was only 10 yards (9.1 m) away but below the level of the trench so to fire into them he stood up. He continued to fire until the casualties had been evacuated. A replacement gun team that had been sent for were injured while moving up and he stayed with the gun until a third team arrived.

In a subsequent attack he took over a 2 inch (51 mm) mortar which he fired from the hip directly into the enemy. He returned to the trench for more ammunition and fired the mortar from out in the open. When this was used up he fired his rifle. The enemy were then very close and without time to reload his rifle, he picked up a "Tommy gun" (sub machine gun) and used it. He killed more of the enemy but received mortal wounds. Despite over 50% losses in the platoon the remainder held on. By the time they were relieved the men had held the ground for 12 hours; they prevented the enemy from advancing further on that hill.

His grave is in the Taukkyan War Cemetery, Burma.

== Bibliography ==
- Ingleton, Roy (2011). Kent VCs. Pen and Sword Books. ISBN 978-1848844094.
