= Battle of Hill 170 =

Battle of World War II

- Part of the Burma campaign of World War II
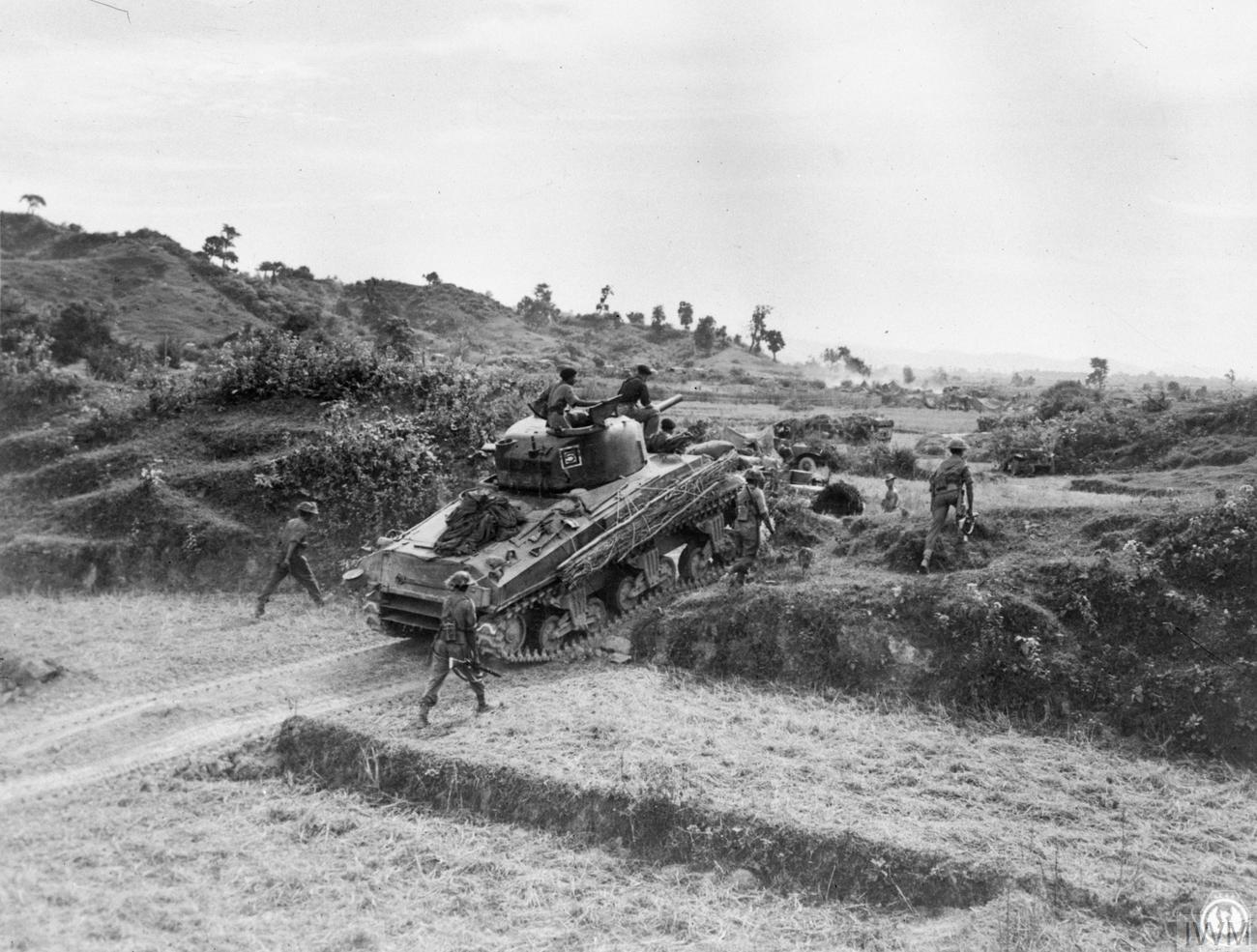
- A Sherman tank of the 19th King George's Own Lancers, getting into position to fire at Japanese lines in the Arakan hills, 22 January 1945
Date	22–31 January 1945
Location	Arakan, Burma
Result	British victory

Belligerents
British Empire	Empire of Japan

Commanders and leaders
(United Kingdom) Campbell Hardy	(Empire of Japan) Shigesaburō Miyazaki

Units involved
3 Commando Brigade	54th Division

Casualties and losses
45 dead 90 wounded	Minimum 340 dead Wounded unknown

The Battle of Hill 170 was a battle between the British 3rd Commando Brigade and the Japanese 54th Division during the Second World War. The battle was fought in January 1945, as part of the Burma Campaign.

The 3rd Commando Brigade were given the task of assaulting the Arakan Peninsula at Myebon. Here they were to take and hold the dominant features of the southern Chin Hills. If they could achieve this, they would cut off the supply and escape routes of the Japanese to Rangoon and secure the bridgehead. The battle for Hill 170 was the climax of the Arakan operations, and its outcome broke the spirit of the Japanese 54th Division. Had the commandos' positions fallen, this would have endangered all the Allied units that had landed on the Myebon Peninsula.

After the battle, the commander of the XV Indian Corps—Lieutenant General Sir Philip Christison—stated in a special order of the day to the 3rd Commando Brigade, "The Battle of Kangaw had been the decisive battle of the whole Arakan campaign and that it was won was very largely due to your magnificent defence of Hill 170."

== Background ==
In late December 1944, XV Indian Corps—commanded by Lieutenant General Christison—went on the offensive, and on 29 December the 3rd Commando Brigade—then commanded by Brigadier Campbell Hardy—carried out an unopposed landing on the island of Akyab. Following this reconnaissance, operations were undertaken around the Myebon Peninsula and on the surrounding islands. During one of these patrols, a group of commandos from No. 5 Commando had a brief contact with a Japanese force during which they killed four Japanese without suffering loss themselves.

On 12 January 1945, the commando brigade carried out a landing on the peninsula. Coming ashore in the second wave behind No. 42 (Royal Marine) Commando, No. 5 Commando carried the advance inland until they came under machine gun fire from a hill that had been named 'Rose' by the planning staff. The following morning, after air support was called in and tanks from the 19th Lancers were brought up, No. 5 Commando launched an attack on the position. In the end, the attack was successful and as the defenders chose to fight to the death, no prisoners were taken.

For the next couple of days, No. 5 Commando carried out patrols throughout the peninsula as the enemy were cleared from the area, before they were withdrawn to the beachhead for a couple of days rest. After this, the brigade captured the village of Kantha as a preliminary move on Kangaw, across a number of waterways on the mainland, where Christison had decided that he wanted to cut the Japanese line of withdrawal. The terrain was difficult, with no roads and consisting of mangrove swamps and rice paddies that prevented tanks or artillery coming ashore initially. The whole area was dominated by a small wooded ridge known as Hill 170.

== Battle ==
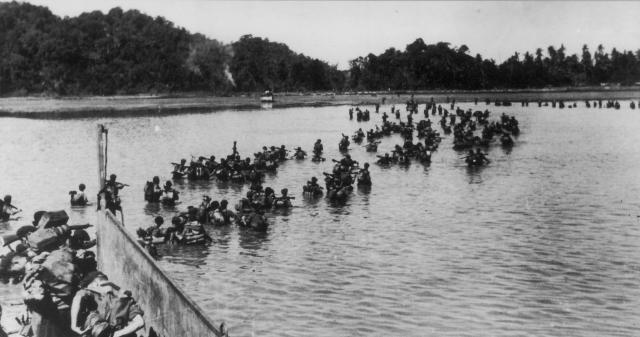
3rd Commando Brigade coming ashore during the Burma Campaign

3 Commando Brigade landed 2 mi (3.2 km) south of Kangaw. The brigade landed without any naval or air bombardment in an attempt to surprise the Japanese. The units of the brigade were given different objectives. 1 Commando in the lead would secure Hill 170, a 700 yd (640 m) long, 300 yd (270 m) wide and 1,000 ft (300 m) high hill codenamed "Brighton", supported by 5 Commando. 42 Commando would be responsible for the security of the beachhead between two tidal creeks which were codenamed "Thames" and "Mersey". 44 Commando's objectives were two valleys codenamed "Milford" and "Pinner" to the east of Hill 170. "Milford" was secured on 22 January and "Pinner" the following day. All the objectives were taken with minimal Japanese resistance. Over the night of 23/24 January, the Japanese attacked "Pinner" and an artillery barrage unprecedented for the theatre of war landed on Hill 170 and would continue for the next four days.

On 26 January, 51st Indian Infantry Brigade—supported by a troop of Sherman tanks from the 19th Lancers—arrived from the beachhead and took over the positions of 44 Commando on "Milford" and "Pinner". On the night of 28/29 January, 51st Brigade attacked Kangaw and two heights codenamed "Perth" and "Melrose" which dominated the road east from Kangow. Though they only partially achieved their objectives as the Japanese resistance along their withdrawal route was increasing, Kangaw was captured and the British occupied positions to dominate the main road.

=== Japanese counter-attack ===
The plan was for 3 Commando Brigade to withdraw on 30 January but the plans were halted by a new Japanese counter-attack on the brigade's positions by the 154th Infantry Regiment. The next morning at 05:45, the 2nd Battalion, 154th Infantry Regiment launched a surprise attack on Hill 170 under cover of a fierce artillery bombardment and heavy machine gun fire. The focus of their attack was the northern end of Hill 170 defended by No. 4 Troop, No. 1 Commando. The troop's position was ringed by gunfire in a preliminary to a major attack. Throwing grenades in front of them, the Japanese attacked at 07:30 on a 100 yd (91 m) front platoon by platoon.

Hill 170 was now defended by No. 1 and No. 42 commandos supported by a tank troop from the 19th Lancers. The tanks at the northern end of the hill were attacked in a suicidal assault by Japanese engineers armed with explosive charges on the end of bamboo poles. The engineers destroyed two of the three Sherman tanks after a hand-to-hand battle by climbing on top of them and exploding their charges.

The Japanese infantry attacked Hill 170 throughout the rest of the day, the brunt of these attacks falling on No. 4 Troop of No. 1 Commando. At 09:30, a counter-attack was launched by W Troop, No. 42 Commando and No. 3 Troop, No. 1 Commando, that had to be abandoned after advancing only 20 yd (18 m) against massed machine gun fire. The next counter-attack was by X Troop, No. 42 Commando supported by the remaining Sherman tank that also failed in the face of the heavy Japanese fire. The commandos then responded by bringing all available artillery and mortar fire down on the Japanese positions. At 14:00, No. 6 Troop, No. 1 Commando put in a counter-attack but this also failed, with the troop losing nearly half of its men. To the east of Hill 170 on "Pinner", No. 5 Commando was by then relieved by the 8/19th Hyderabad Regiment from the 51st Brigade and rejoined the 3rd Commando Brigade on Hill 170, their machine guns adding to the weight of fire brought to bear on the Japanese. At 16:00, the 2/2nd Punjab Regiment from the 51st Brigade managed to work their way around the left flank of Hill 170 and engaged the Japanese from there. At the same time No. 5 Commando were moved forward to take over the front line from No.4 Troop except for one section that had been cut off and overrun. Just after 17:00 some Japanese were seen to be withdrawing from the hill and the 2/2nd Punjabi Regiment started a flanking night attack but this failed to drive the Japanese off their positions on the hill. The Japanese responded with a night attack of their own against No. 5 Commando's positions that also failed.

An estimated 700 Japanese shells landed on the hill during the last day of the battle. In a day of continuous fighting, much of it hand-to-hand, the men of No. 1 and No. 42 commandos had repulsed and counter-attacked the waves of Japanese infantry. Early the following morning, No. 5 Commando was able to move forward and found the hill abandoned, apart from over 340 Japanese dead. The British losses for the battle were 45 dead and 90 wounded.

== Aftermath ==
The commandos' victory in the 36-hour battle for Hill 170 cut off the escape of the 54th Japanese Division. Further amphibious landings by the 25th Indian Infantry Division and the overland advance of the 82nd (West Africa) Division made the Japanese position in the Arakan untenable and they ordered a general withdrawal to avoid the complete destruction of the Twenty-Eighth Japanese Army.

In recognition of the battle, the commandos were awarded the battle honour Kangaw. The men of 3rd Commando Brigade were awarded a number of decorations for gallantry, which included a posthumous Victoria Cross for Lieutenant George Knowland No. 4 Troop, No.1 Commando. His citation reads:

In Burma on 31 January 1945, near Kangaw, Lieutenant Knowland was commanding the forward platoon of a Troop positioned on the extreme North of a hill which was subjected to very heavy and repeated enemy attacks – throughout the whole day. Before the first attack started, Lieutenant Knowland's platoon was heavily mortared and machine gunned, yet he moved about among his men keeping them alert and encouraging them, though under fire himself at the time. When the enemy, some 300 strong in all, made their first assault they concentrated all their efforts on his platoon of 24 men, but, in spite of the ferocity of the attack, he moved about from trench to trench distributing ammunition, and firing his rifle and throwing grenades at the enemy, often from completely exposed positions. Later, when the crew of one of his forward Bren Guns had all been wounded, he sent back to Troop Headquarters for another crew and ran forward to man the gun himself until they arrived. The enemy was then less than 10 yards (9.1 m) from him in dead ground down the hill, so, in order to get a better field of fire, he stood on top of the trench, firing the light machine gun from his hip, and successfully keeping them at a distance until a Medical Orderly had dressed and evacuated the wounded men behind him. The new Bren team also became casualties on the way up, and Lieutenant Knowland continued to fire the gun until another team took over. Later, when a fresh attack came in, he took over a 2-inch mortar and in spite of heavy fire and the closeness of the enemy, he stood up in the open to face them, firing the mortar from his hip and killing six of them with his first bomb. When all bombs were expended he went back through heavy grenade, mortar and machine gun fire to get more, which he fired in the same way from the open in front of his platoon positions. When those bombs were finished, he went back to his own trench, and still standing up fired his rifle at them. Being hard pressed and with enemy closing in on him from only 10 yards away, he had no time to re-charge his magazine. Snatching up the Tommy gun of a casualty, he sprayed the enemy and was mortally wounded stemming this assault, though not before he had killed and wounded many of the enemy. Such was the inspiration of his magnificent heroism, that, though fourteen out of twenty four of his platoon became casualties at an early stage, and six of his positions were overrun by the enemy, his men held on through twelve hours of continuous and fierce fighting until reinforcements arrived. If this Northern end of the hill had fallen, the rest of the hill would have been endangered, the beach-head dominated by the enemy, and other units farther inland cut off from their source of supplies. As it was, the final successful counter-attack was later launched from the vital ground which Lieutenant Knowland had taken such a gallant part in holding.
