= Operation Chopper (World War II) =

Operation Chopper was a British Commando raid by No. 1 Commando during the Second World War.

The raid, over the night of 27/28 September 1941, targeted Saint-Aubin-d'Arquenay in France; a troop of No. 1 Commando spent a day ashore.

Sixty-five soldiers from No. 1 Commando left Portsmouth at 16.50 hours on 27 September 1941. Their mission was to land on the Norman coast at night in order to sound out the German defences, take prisoners and, above all, to harass the enemy by showing that Great Britain was still on the offensive.

Part of the unit (Troop A) was to land at Saint-Vaast-La Hougue and the other (Troop B) at Courseulles-sur-Mer, but as a result of navigation problems, the motor gun boat towing the two landing craft carrying Troop B, drifted off-course. At around 01.30 hours - more than an hour late - the commando unit, led by Lieutenant Tom GORDON HEMMING, arrived, not at Courseulles-sur-mer, but at Luc-sur-Mer, landing at the foot of the sea wall, a few metres away from the Hôtel Beau Rivage, where the German command post was located.

Two commandos - Corporal Cyril EVANS (age 24) and Fusilier Elwyn EDWARDS (age 20) - were killed and later buried in the cemetery at Luc-sur-Mer. The others made it back to Portsmouth on 28 September 1941 at around 10 o'clock in the morning.

Both Lieutenant - later Captain - Gordon Hemming and his wife asked to be buried in the cemetery at Luc-sur-Mer, near the men he lost in the early hours of 28 September 1941.
