= No. 1 Commando =

- Active: 1940–1947
- Disbanded: February 1947
- Country: United Kingdom
- Branch: British Army
- Type: Commando
- Role: Amphibious warfare Close-quarters combat Coastal raiding Direct action Jungle warfare Raiding; Reconnaissance
- Size: Battalion
- Part of: Combined Operations
- Garrison/HQ: Dartmouth
- Engagements: Second World War: Operation Deep Cut; Operation Myrmidion; Operation Torch; Battle of Hill 170

Insignia
- Shoulder Patch

The No. 1 Commando was a unit of the British Commandos and part of the British Army during the Second World War. It was raised in 1940 from the ranks of the existing independent companies. Operationally they carried out a series of small scale cross channel raids and spearheaded the Operation Torch landings in North Africa. They were then sent to India as part of the 3rd Commando Brigade and took part in operations in the Burma Campaign. During the Second World War, only eight commandos were recipients of the Victoria Cross; two of the eight were from No. 1 Commando. After the war they were sent to reoccupy Hong Kong before being amalgamated with No. 5 Commando to form No. 1/5 Commando. The amalgamated No. 1/5 Commando was disbanded in 1947.

== Background ==
The commandos were formed in 1940, by the order of Winston Churchill the British Prime Minister. He called for specially trained troops that would "develop a reign of terror down the enemy coast". At first they were a small force of volunteers who carried out small raids against enemy occupied territory, but by 1943 their role had changed into lightly equipped assault Infantry which specialised in spearheading amphibious landings.

The man initially selected as the overall commander of the force was Admiral Sir Roger Keyes himself a veteran of the landings at Gallipoli and the Zeebrugge raid in the First World War. Keyes resigned in October 1941 and was replaced by Admiral Louis Mountbatten.

By the autumn of 1940 more than 2,000 men had volunteered for commando training, and what became known as the Special Service Brigade was formed into 12 units called commandos. Each commando would number around 450 men commanded by a lieutenant colonel. They were sub divided into troops of 75 men and further divided into 15-man sections. Commandos were all volunteers seconded from other British Army regiments and retained their own cap badges and remained on their regimental roll for pay. All volunteers went through the six-week intensive commando course at Achnacarry. The course in the Scottish Highlands concentrated on fitness, speed marches, weapons training, map reading, climbing, small boat operations and demolitions both by day and by night.

By 1943 the commandos had moved away from small raiding operations and had been formed into brigades of assault infantry to spearhead future Allied landing operations. Three units were left un-brigaded to carry out smaller-scale raids.

== Formation ==
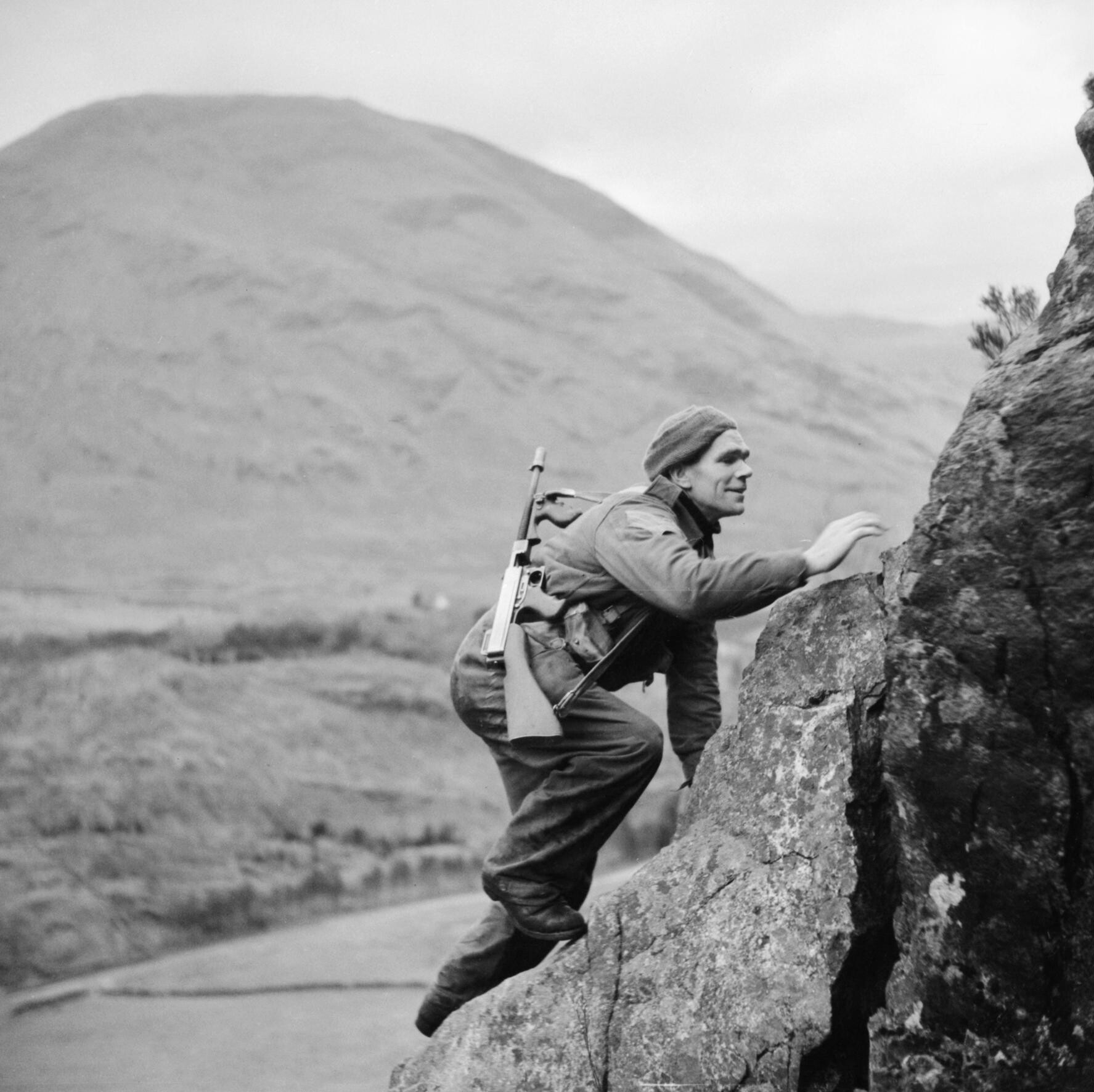
A soldier from No. 1 Commando climbs up a steep rock face during training at Glencoe, Scotland, 19 November 1941.

The men for No. 1 Commando were all originally from the disbanded No. 6 and No. 8 Independent Companies and formed the commando on 13 June 1940. Then on 27 July 1940 the commando became part of No. 1 Special Service Battalion. It was reformed as No. 1 Commando again 5 March 1941 and stationed in Dartmouth.

For a raiding force the normal British Army regimental or battalion structure was deemed unsuitable, so the commandos devised a new structure. This new structure would not have any heavy weapons or motor transport attached and would consist of a small headquarters of six officers, four senior Non-commissioned officers, 23 other ranks and eight men attached from the RAMC and RAOC. The commando initially consisted of 10 troops each of 50 men and was commanded by a captain. Each troop was divided into two sections of 24 men with a junior officer in command. The commando had no special equipment issued: they carried small arms identical to those of other British infantry forces – Lee–Enfield rifles, Bren light machine guns and Thompson submachine guns (plus from Operation Torch onwards until after the war, the US M1 Garand). The only heavy weapon issued was a Boys anti-tank rifle. In 1943, No. 1 Commando also came under command the 3rd Special Service Brigade. With the move to the 3rd Special Service Brigade the commando formation changed and now consisted of six troops one being a heavy weapons troop of nine Vickers machine guns detachments and nine 3 inch Mortar detachments. The five other fighting troops had also changed and now consisted of a small four-man headquarters and two sections of 31 men further divided into two sub-sections of 14 men.

== Operations ==
Compared to the other commando formations, No. 1 Commando got off to a late start. It had to wait for its men to arrive from the independent companies, who continued to guard the British coastline in the face of a potential German invasion. Operations No.1 Commando participated in included Operation Chopper, a raid on the French coast on the night of 27/28 August 1941. There followed Operation Myrmidion, a raid on Bayonne over the period of 2–7 April 1942 which was eventually aborted.

The commando next supplied a troop for the St. Nazaire Raid, a successful attack on the heavily defended docks of St. Nazaire in France on the night of 28 March 1942. During the raid Sergeant Thomas Frank Durrant won the Victoria Cross. The award was unique: he is the only soldier to receive the Victoria Cross for a naval action, and in that it was recommended by the enemy.

The commando then withdrew from raiding operations to prepare for the Operation Torch landings in North Africa in November 1942. During Operation Torch No. 1 Commando became the first unit to wear the commando green beret. During the Tunisia Campaign the commando got involved in first battle of Sedjenane between February and March 1943.

After a short stay regrouping in England the command sailed for India. From September 1944 it fought as part of 3 Commando brigade in Burma and the Arakan. One notable engagement was battle of Hill 170 at Kangaw. Kangaw became one of the most intense battles of the whole Burma campaign and during the fighting Lieutenant George Arthur Knowland earned the commando's second Victoria Cross.

In March 1945 the commando withdrew back to India to prepare for Operation Zipper, the planned invasion of Malaya. The war ended before the Zipper landing could take place, and the commando went to liberate Hong Kong instead.

== Disbandment ==
Following the end of the war, No. 1 Commando undertook garrison duties in Hong Kong. As the demobilisation process occurred, the unit's numbers began to dwindle and it was amalgamated with No. 5 Commando. In 1946 the decision was made to disband the Army commandos and subsequently the 3 Commando Brigade became a formation of the Royal Marines, which continues to exist today. As a result, No. 1/5 Commando was formed on 23 March 1946 and disbanded in February 1947.

== Victoria Cross recipients ==
Sergeant Thomas Frank Durrant Victoria Cross citation:

For great gallantry, skill and devotion to duty when in charge of a Lewis gun in HM Motor Launch 306 in the St Nazaire raid on 28 March 1942. Motor Launch 306 came under heavy fire while proceeding up the river Loire towards the port. Sergeant Durrant, in his position abaft the bridge, where he had no cover or protection, engaged enemy gun positions and searchlights ashore. During this engagement he was severely wounded in the arm but refused to leave his gun. The Motor Launch subsequently went down the river and was attacked by a German destroyer at 50 to 60 yards range, and often closer. In this action Sergeant Durrant continued to fire at the destroyer's bridge with the greatest of coolness and with complete disregard of the enemy's fire. The Motor Launch was illuminated by the enemy searchlight, and Sergeant Durrant drew on himself the individual attention of the enemy guns, and was again wounded in many places. Despite these further wounds he stayed in his exposed position, still firing his gun, although after a time only able to support himself by holding on to the gun mounting. After a running fight, the Commander of the German destroyer called on the Motor Launch to surrender. Sergeant Durrant's answer was a further burst of fire at the destroyer's bridge. Although now very weak, he went on firing, using drums of ammunition as fast as they could be replaced. A renewed attack by the enemy vessel eventually silenced the fire of the Motor Launch, but Sergeant Durrant refused to give up until the destroyer came alongside, grappled the Motor Launch and took prisoner those who remained alive. Sergeant Durrant's gallant fight was commended by the German officers on boarding the Motor Launch. This very gallant non-commissioned officer later died of the many wounds received in action.

Lieutenant George Knowland Victoria Cross citation:

In Burma on 31 January 1945, near Kangaw, Lieutenant Knowland was commanding the forward platoon of a Troop positioned on the extreme North of a hill which was subjected to very heavy and repeated enemy attacks throughout the whole day. Before the first attack started, Lieutenant Knowland's platoon was heavily mortared and machine gunned, yet he moved about among his men keeping them alert and encouraging them, though under fire himself at the time. When the enemy, some 300 strong in all, made their first assault they concentrated all their effects on his platoon of 24 men but in spite of the ferocity of the attack, he moved about from trench to trench distributing ammunition, and firing his rifle and throwing grenades at the enemy, often from completely exposed positions. Later, when the crew of one of his forward Bren guns had all been wounded, he sent back to troop Headquarters for another crew and ran forward to man the gun himself until they arrived. The enemy was then less than 10 yards from him in dead ground down the hill so in order to get a better field of fire, he stood on top of the trench, firing the light machine gun from his hip and successfully keeping them at a distance until a Medical Orderly had dressed and evacuated the wounded men behind him. the new Bren Gun team also became casualties on the way up and Lieutenant Knowland continued to fire the gun until another team took over. Later, when a fresh attack came in he took over a 2 inch Mortar and in spite of heavy fire and the closeness of the enemy, he stood up in the open to face them, firing the mortar from his hip and killing six of them with his first bomb. When all bombs were expended he went back through heavy grenade, mortar and machine gun fire to get more, which he fired in the same way from the open in front of his platoon positions. When those bombs were finished he went back to his own trench and still standing up fired his rifle at them. Being hard pressed and with the enemy closing in on him from only 10 yards away, he had no time to re-charge his magazine. Snatching up the Tommy gun of a casualty, he sprayed the enemy and was mortally wounded stemming this assault, though not before he had killed and wounded many of the enemy. Such was the inspiration of his magnificent heroism, that, though fourteen out of twenty-four of his platoon became casualties at an early stage, and six of his positions were overrun by the enemy, his men held on through twelve hours of continuous and fierce fighting until reinforcements arrived. If this Northern end of the hill had fallen the rest of the hill would have been endangered, the beach-head dominated by the enemy and other units farther inland cut off from their source of supplies. As it was, the final successful counter-attack was later launched from the vital ground which Lieutenant Knowland had taken such a gallant part in holding.

== Battle honours ==
The following Battle honours were awarded to the British Commandos during the Second World War.

- Adriatic
- Alethangyaw
- Aller
- Anzio
- Argenta Gap
- Burma 1943–45
- Crete
- Dieppe
- Dives Crossing
- Djebel Choucha
- Flushing
- Greece 1944–45
- Italy 1943–45
- Kangaw
- Landing at Porto San Venere
- Landing in Sicily
- Leese
- Litani
- Madagascar
- Middle East 1941, 1942, 1944
- Monte Ornito
- Myebon
- Normandy Landing
- North Africa 1941–43
- North-West Europe 1942, 1944–1945
- Norway 1941
- Pursuit to Messina
- Rhine
- St. Nazaire
- Salerno
- Sedjenane 1
- Sicily 1943
- Steamroller Farm
- Syria 1941
- Termoli
- Vaagso
- Valli di Comacchio
- Westkapelle
