= Landing craft =

Seagoing watercraft

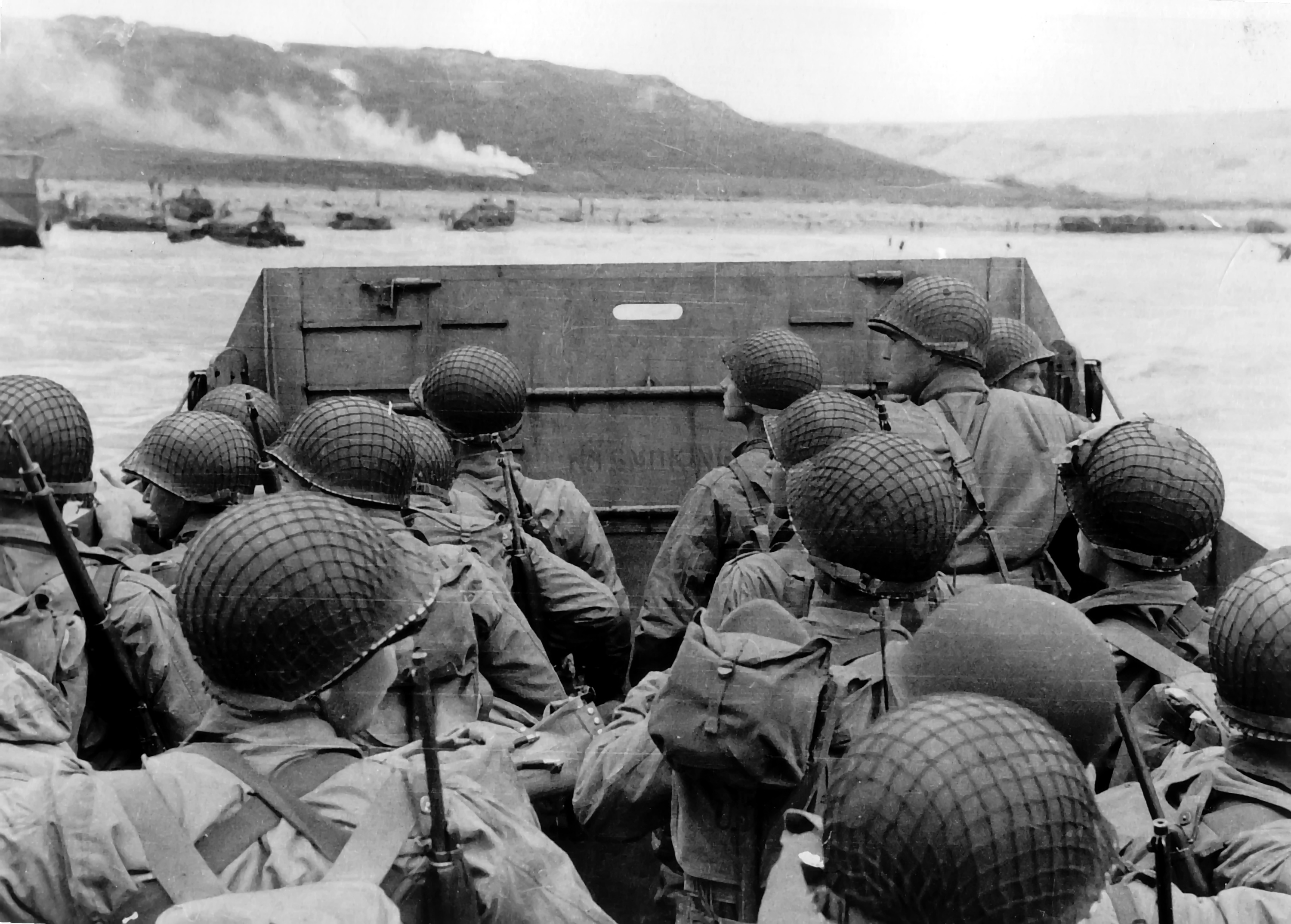
Landing Craft, Vehicle, Personnel (LCVP) used in the Invasion of Normandy in World War II

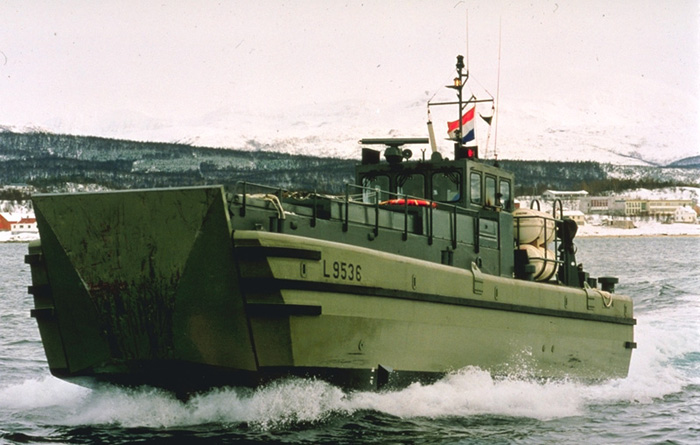
Dutch landing craft

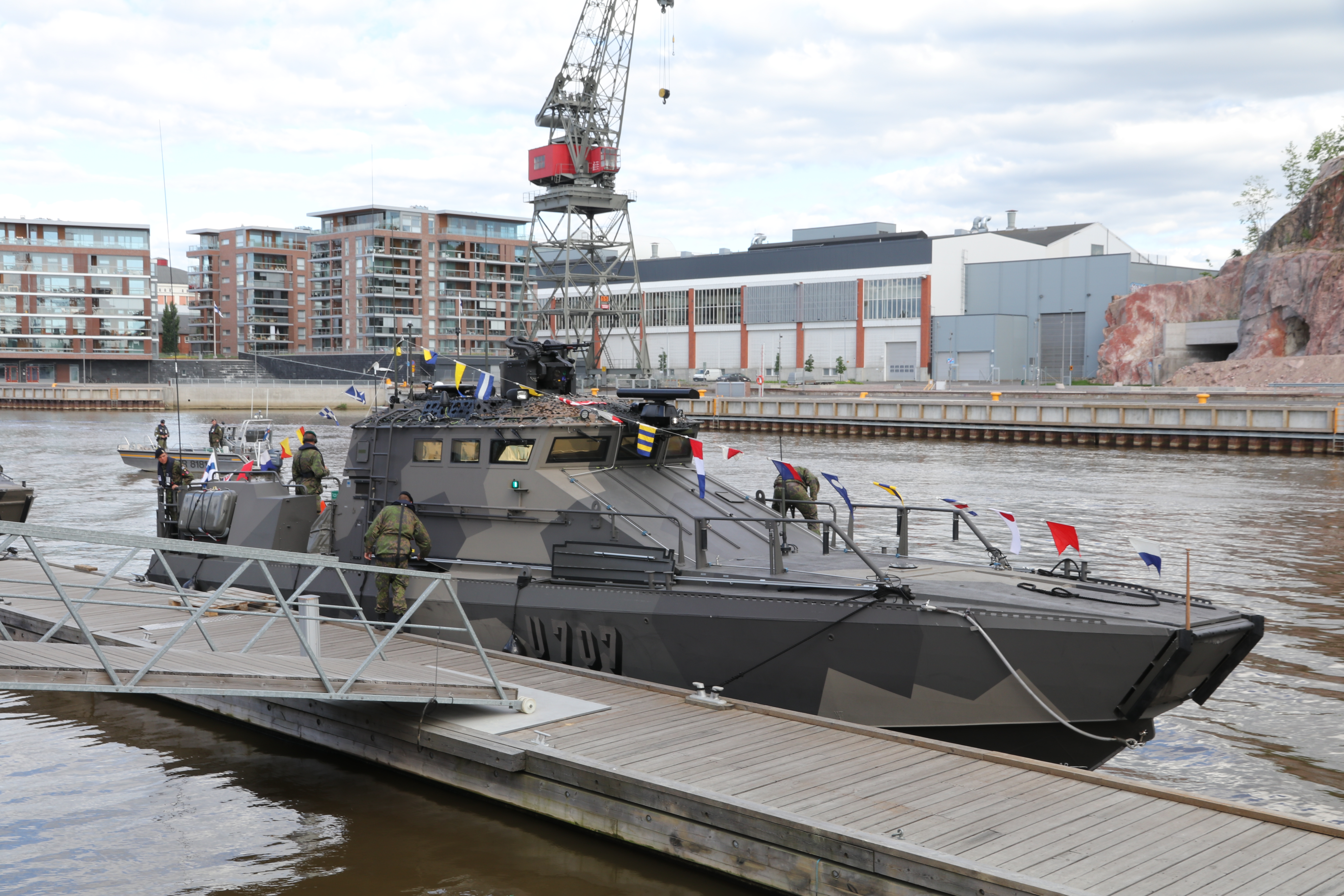
Finnish Jehu-class landing craft

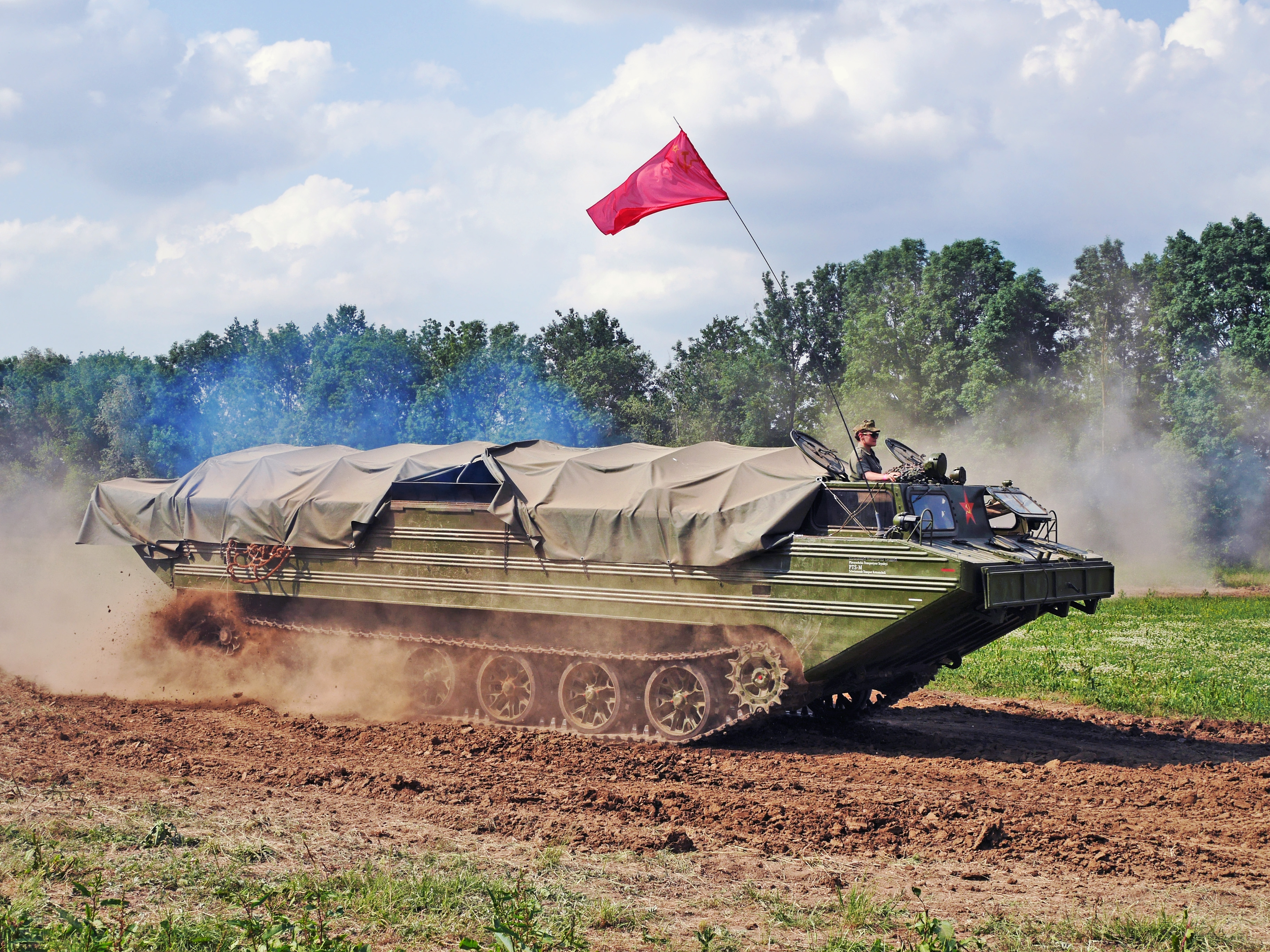
The Soviet-built PTS-M is an unarmoured, fully tracked landing craft that was designed to transport troops or equipment inland.

Landing craft are small and medium seagoing watercraft, such as boats and barges, used to convey a landing force (such as infantry and its vehicles) from the sea to the shore during an amphibious assault. The term excludes landing ships, which are larger, and smaller craft, such as paddled soft-bottomed rubber rafts. Production of landing craft peaked during World War II, with a significant number of different designs produced in large quantities by the United Kingdom and United States.

Because of the need to run up onto a suitable beach, World War II landing craft were flat-bottomed, and many designs had a flat front, often with a lowerable ramp, rather than a normal bow. This made them difficult to control and very uncomfortable in rough seas. The helm (too rudimentary to call a bridge on the smaller craft) was normally at the extreme rear of the vessel, with the notable exception of the LCA, where an armoured box was provided. In all cases, WWII landing craft were known by an abbreviation derived from the official name rather than by the full title.

== History ==
Ship's boats were used as landing craft in the days of sail. These utility boats were sufficient in an era when marines were effectively light infantry which engaged mostly in small-scale engagements against enemy forces and settlements, often in far-flung colonies and against less well-equipped indigenous opponents.

=== Predecessors ===
Barges redesigned as landing craft were used by Álvaro de Bazán, Marquis of Santa Cruz during the conquest of the Azores in 1583. They were assisted in their movement by galleys, which also assisted two heavy galleasses brought to cover the landing with their firepower.

In order to support amphibious operations during the landing in Pisagua (1879) by carrying significant quantities of cargo, and landing troops directly onto an unimproved shore, the Government of Chile built flat-bottomed landing craft, called Chalanas. They transported 1,200 men in the first landing and took on board 600 men in less than 2 hours for the second landing.

=== Origins ===
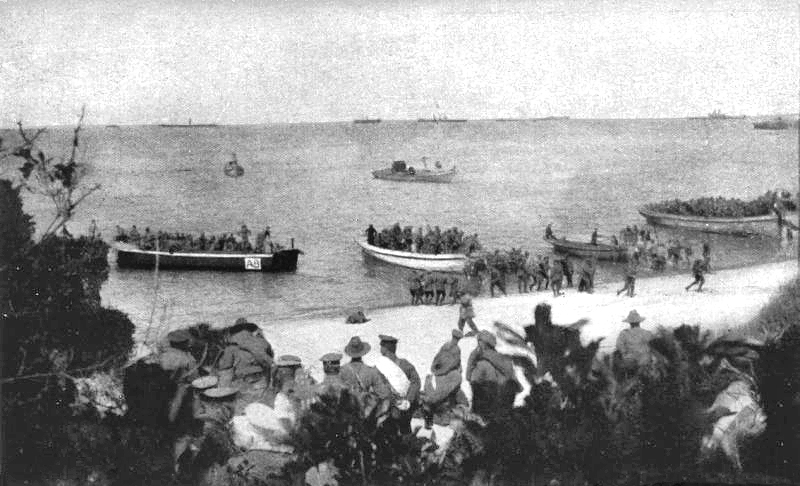
Amphibious landing at Anzac Beach during the Gallipoli campaign of World War I, on April 25, 1915

During World War I, initial amphibious landings during the Gallipoli campaign took place in unmodified ship's boats that were extremely vulnerable to attack from the Turkish shore defenses. The mass mobilization of troops equipped with rapid-fire weapons quickly rendered such boats obsolete.

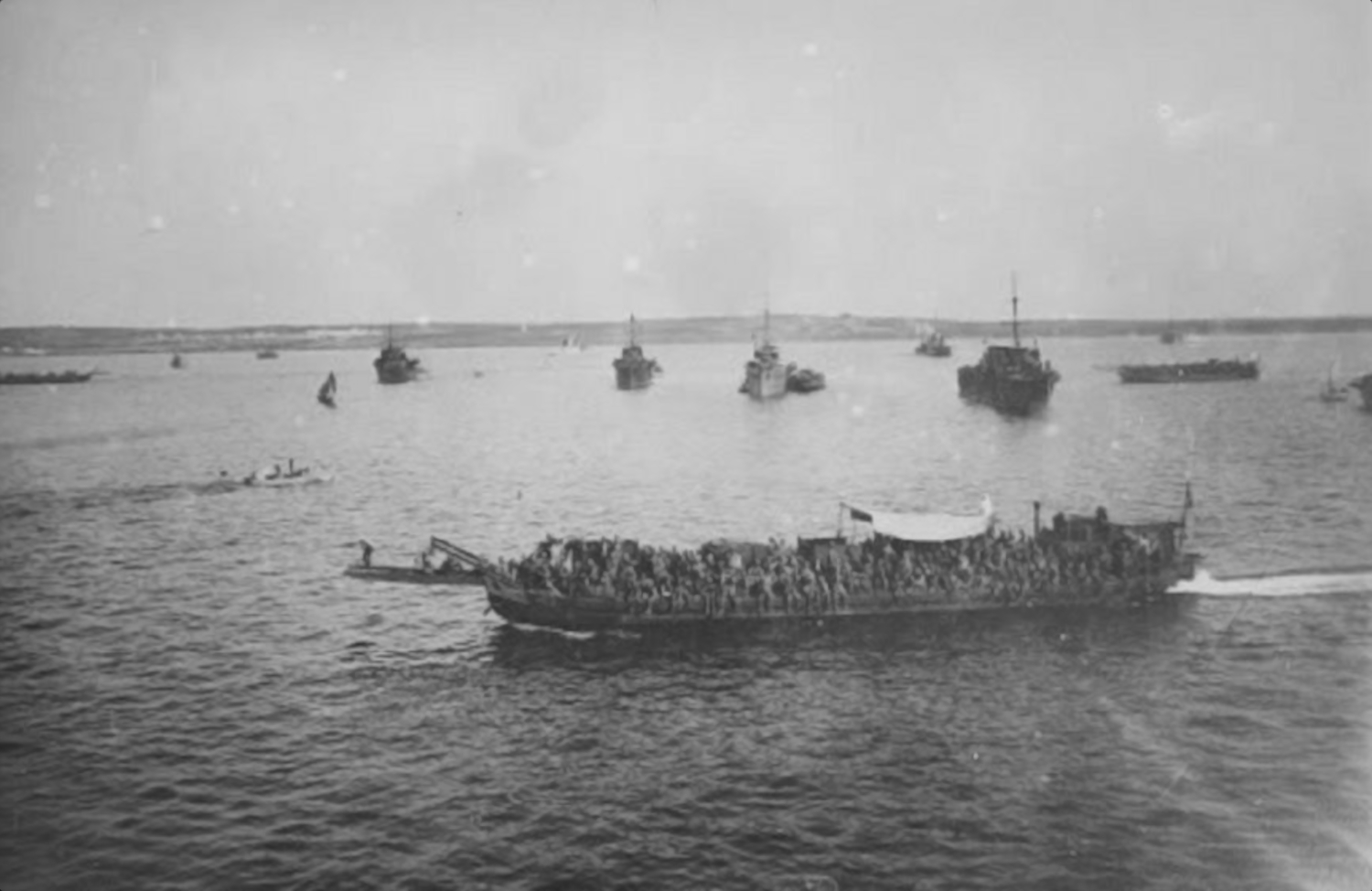
A British X-lighter, 1916

In February 1915, orders were placed for the design of purpose built landing craft. A design was created in four days resulting in an order for 200 'X' Lighters (or X-lighters) with a spoon-shaped bow to take shelving beaches and a drop down frontal ramp.

The first use took place after they had been towed to the Aegean and performed successfully in the 6 August landing at Suvla Bay of IX Corps.

'X' Lighters, known to the soldiers as 'Black Beetles', carried about 500 men, displaced 200 tons (or 160 tons according to some sources) and were based on London barges being 105 feet 6 inches long, 21 feet wide, and 7 feet 6 inches deep (32.2 m × 6.4 m × 2.3 m). The engines mainly ran on heavy oil and ran at a maximal speed of approximately 8 knots (15 km/h; 9.2 mph). The boats had bulletproof sides and a ramp at the bow for disembarkation.

Spain purchased 26–28 X-lighters. During the Rif War, they were used in the 1925 Alhucemas landing, arguably the first major amphibious landing in which tanks were disembarked in large numbers.

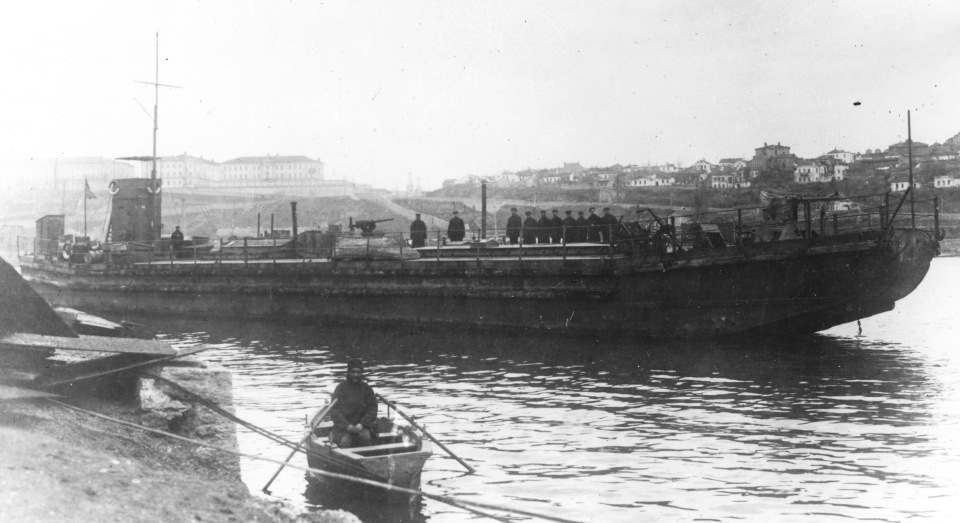
A Russud-class landing self-propelled barge (the Russian designation is Bolinder class), 1919

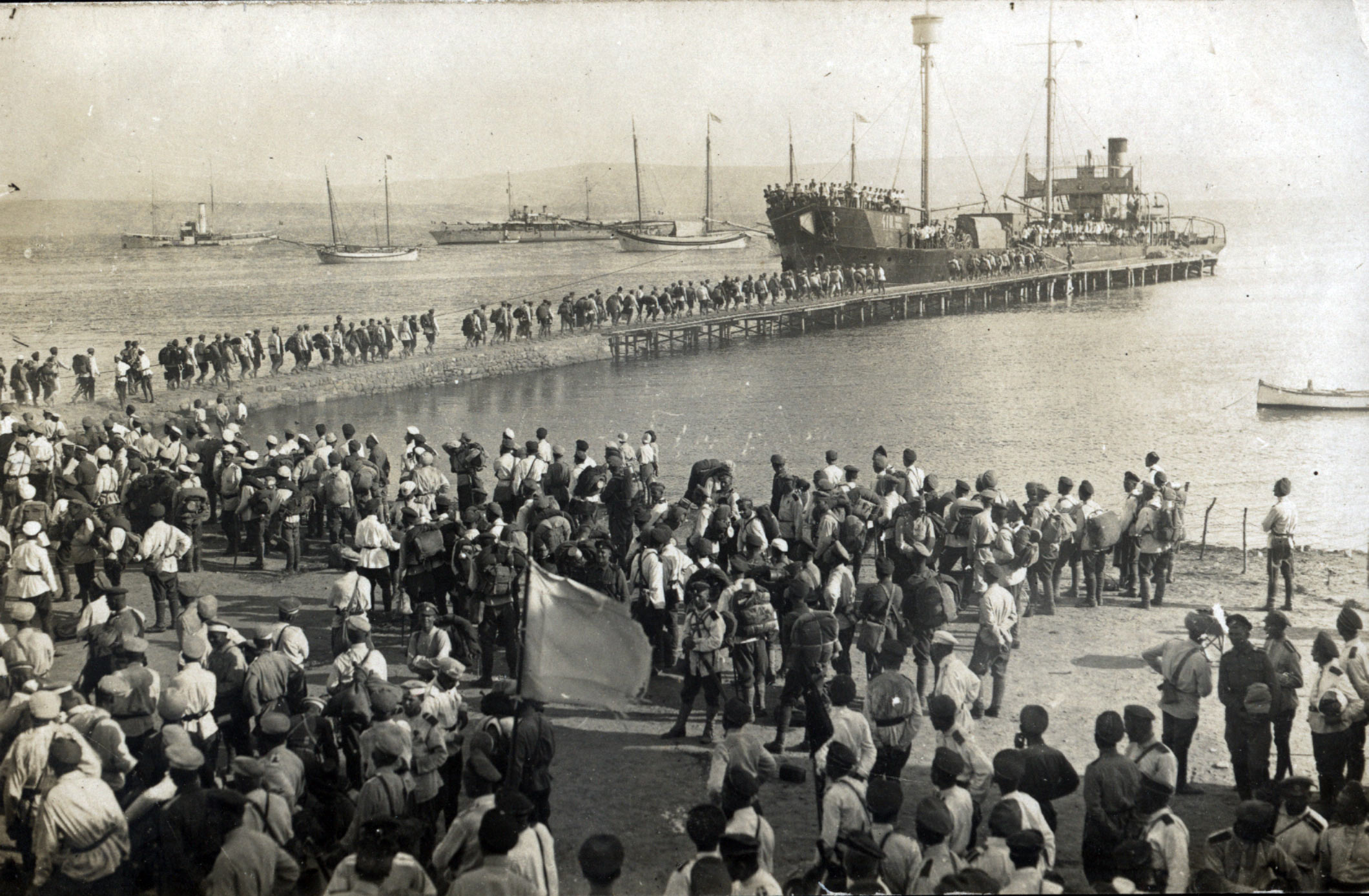
Wrangel's Army troops are being loaded onto the Elpidifor-class landing steamship Vera (ex-Elpidifor No. 410) during departure from Gelibolu to Serbia, 1921

The Imperial Russian Navy soon followed suit, building at the Russud Shipyard in 1916 a series of similar landing motor barges of the so-called Bolinder class (a.k.a. the Russud class), named in Russia after the supplier of semi-diesel engines installed in them. These, however, proved too small and unseaworthy for their intended Black Sea theater, as they were intended for planned landings on the coast of the Marmara Sea and Turkish straits. Instead, a new ship class was designed, based on a widespread in Southern Russia merchant ship type of the era which were Azov–Black Sea steam schooners – so-called Elpidifors – commissioned into naval service during World War I and used as landing craft during the Trebizond Campaign, etc. These vessels were given the Elpidifors appellative after one of them, the grain carrier Elpidifor, which was owned by the Rostov-on-Don merchant Elpidifor Paramonov. The 1,300-tonne (1,280-long-ton; 1,430-short-ton), 676-metric-horsepower (667 ihp) Elpidifor class were typically very light at the bow, having all their machinery concentrated at the stern, which allowed easy beaching on any gently sloping coast, and often were equipped with bow gangways for fast unloading. Elpidifor-class steamships had a 1.83-metre (6.0 ft) loaded mean draft and a reinforced hull, were equipped with ballast tanks for safe beaching, and able to land 1,000 troops with their train at virtually any available beach. While the landings for which they were created never happened, the ship class itself turned out quite useful and ships of the class had a long career, supporting Wrangel's Army landings in Kuban and in Northern Taurida during the Russian Civil War, and later were used by the Russian SFSR and the Soviet Union as minesweepers, minelayers, gunboats, and merchant ships.

A plan was devised to land British heavy tanks from pontoons in support of the Third Battle of Ypres, but this was abandoned.

During the inter-war period, the combination of the negative experience at Gallipoli and economic stringency contributed to the delay in procuring equipment and adopting a universal doctrine for amphibious operations in the Royal Navy.

Despite this outlook, the British produced the Motor Landing Craft in 1920, based on their experience with the early 'Black Beetle' armoured transport. The craft could put a medium tank directly onto a beach. From 1924, it was used with landing boats in annual exercises in amphibious landings. A prototype motor landing craft, designed by J. Samuel White of Cowes, was built and first sailed in 1926. It weighed 16 tons and had a box-like appearance, having a square bow and stern. To prevent fouling of the propellers in a craft destined to spend time in surf and possibly be beached, a crude waterjet propulsion system was devised by White's designers. A Hotchkiss petrol engine drove a centrifugal pump which produced a jet of water, pushing the craft ahead or astern, and steering it, according to how the jet was directed. Speed was 5–6 knots and its beaching capacity was good. By 1930, three MLC were operated by the Royal Navy.

The United States revived and experimented in their approach to amphibious warfare between 1913 and mid-1930s, when the United States Navy and United States Marine Corps became interested in setting up advanced bases in opposing countries during wartime; the prototype advanced base force officially evolved into the Fleet Marine Force (FMF) in 1933.

In 1939, during the annual Fleet Landing Exercises, the FMF became interested in the military potential of Andrew Higgins's design of a powered, shallow-draught boat. These LCPL, dubbed the 'Higgins Boats', were reviewed and passed by the U.S. Naval Bureau of Construction and Repair. Soon, the Higgins boats were developed to a final design with a ramp – the LCVP, and were produced in large numbers. The boat was a more flexible variant of the LCPR with a wider ramp. It could carry 36 troops, a small vehicle such as a jeep, or a corresponding amount of cargo.

== Second World War ==
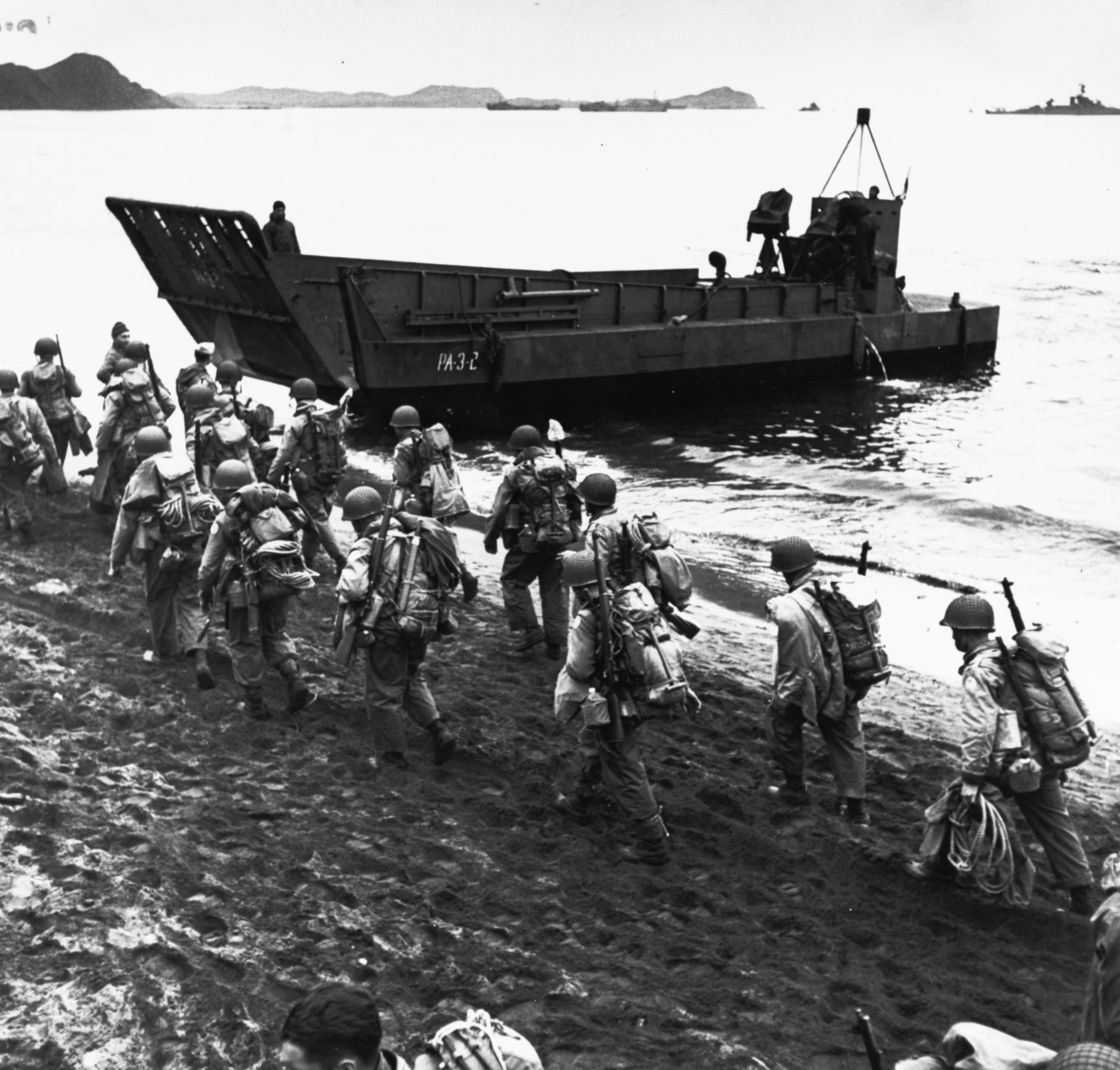
US landing craft mechanized (LCM) during the invasion of Kiska

In the run-up to WWII, many specialized landing craft, both for infantry and vehicles, were developed. At the start of World War II, the Japanese led the world in landing craft design.

=== Specialized infantry landing craft ===
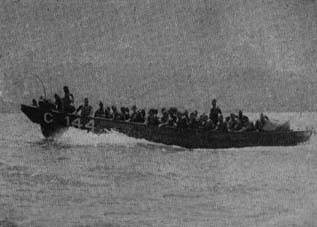
In 1941 a Marine Corps officer showed Higgins a picture of the Imperial Japanese Army practicing landings with the Daihatsu landing craft in 1935, a landing craft with a ramp in the bow, and Higgins was asked to incorporate this design into his Eureka boat. He did so, producing the basic design for the Landing Craft, Vehicle, Personnel (LCVP), often simply called the Higgins boat.

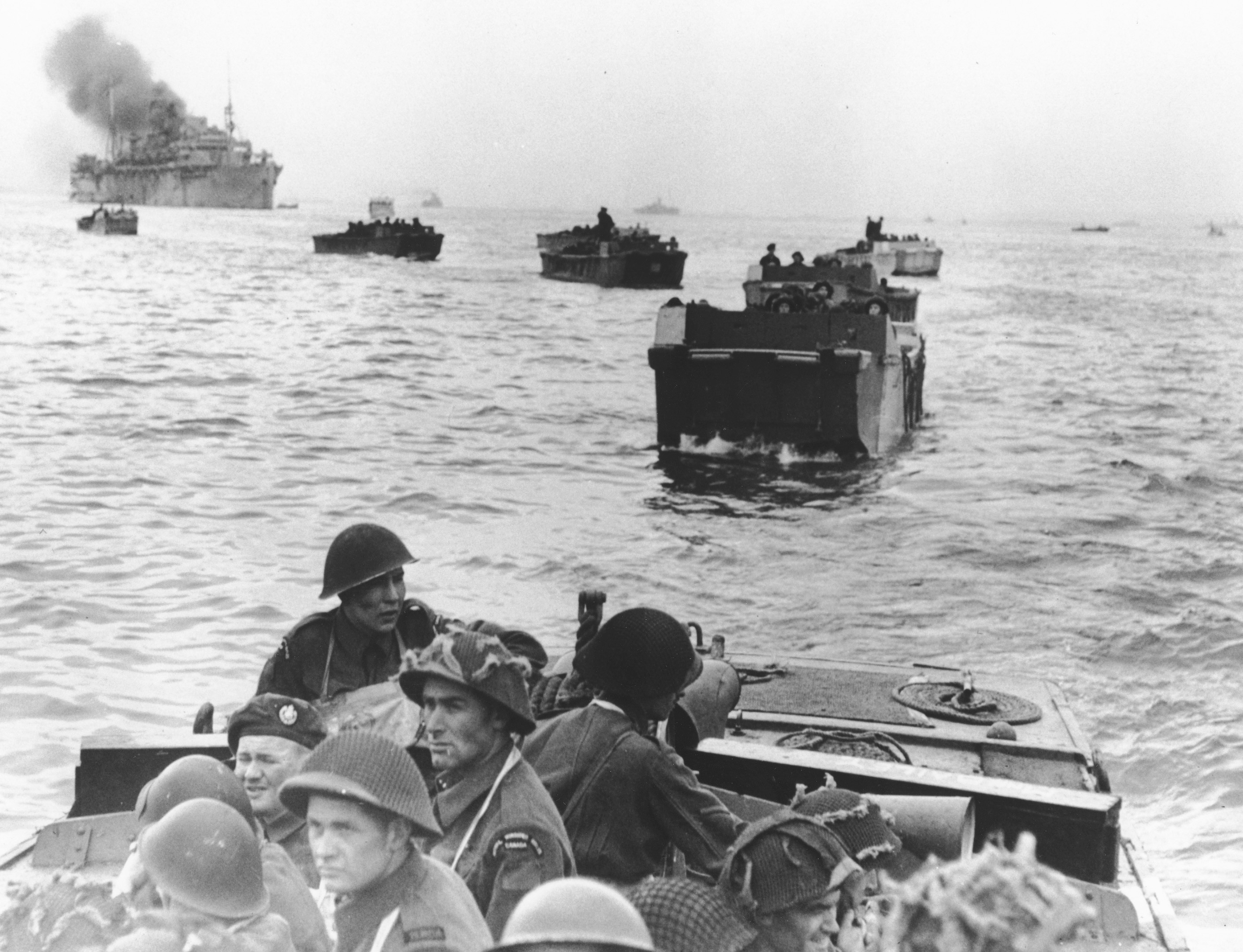
Canadian landings at Juno Beach in the Landing Craft Assault

The Daihatsu-class landing craft was lowered to disembark cargo upon riding up onto a beach. After reviewing photos of a Daihatsu landing craft, this was adopted by American landing craft designer Andrew Higgins in developing the Landing Craft, Personnel (Large) (LCP(L)) into the Landing Craft, Personnel (Ramped) (LCP(R)) and later the Landing Craft, Vehicle and Personnel (LCVP). However, the Daihatsu landing craft was more seaworthy than an LCVP due to its hull design. It was constructed of a metal hull and powered by a diesel engine.

Victor Harold Krulak, a native of Denver, who joined the Marines after graduating from Annapolis in 1934, witnessed the Japanese use small vessels like the Daihatsu-class. In 1937, as a lieutenant in an intelligence outfit during the 1937 Battle of Shanghai, when the Japanese were trying to conquer China, he used a telephoto lens to take pictures of Japanese landing craft with a square bow that became a retractable ramp. Krulak noted that the boats' droppable ramps enabled troops to quickly disembark from the bow, rather than having to clamber over the sides and splash into the surf. Envisioning those ramps as answering the Marines' needs in a looming world war, Lieutenant Krulak showed the photographs to his superiors, who passed on his report to Washington. But two years later, he found that the Navy had simply filed it away with a notation saying it was the work of "some nut out in China." He persevered, building a balsa wood model of the Japanese boat design and discussing the retractable ramp concept with the New Orleans boat builder Andrew Higgins. That bow design became the basis for the thousands of Higgins landing craft of World War II. As according to Victor H. Krulak "the Japanese were light years ahead of us in landing craft design".

In November 1938, the British Inter-Service Training and Development Centre proposed a new type of landing craft. Its specifications were to weigh less than ten long tons, to be able to carry the thirty-one men of a British Army platoon and five assault engineers or signallers, and to be so shallow drafted as to be able to land them, wet only up to their knees, in eighteen inches of water. All of these specifications made the Landing Craft Assault; a separate set of requirements were laid down for a vehicle and supplies carrier, although previously the two roles had been combined in the Motor Landing Craft.

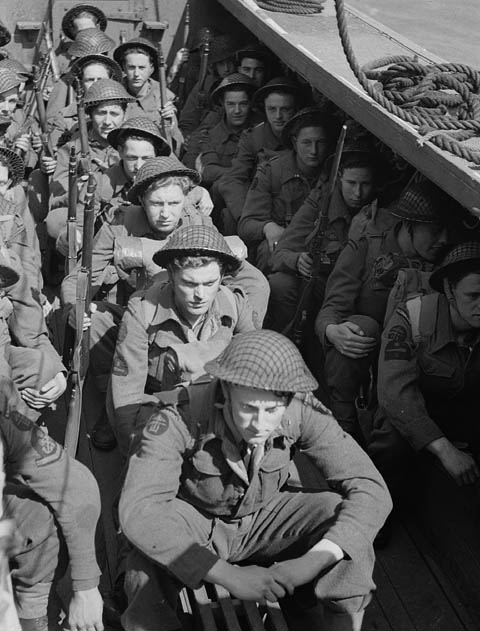
Royal Navy Beach Commandos aboard a Landing Craft Assault of the 529th Flotilla, Royal Navy

J. S. White of Cowes built a prototype to the Fleming design. Eight weeks later the craft was doing trials on the River Clyde. All landing craft designs must find a compromise between two divergent priorities; the qualities that make a good sea boat are opposite to those that make a craft suitable for beaching. The craft had a hull built of double-diagonal mahogany planking. The sides were plated with "10lb. DIHT" armour, a heat treated steel based on D1 steel, in this case Hadfield's Resista 1/4.

The Landing Craft Assault remained the most common British and Commonwealth landing craft of World War II, and the humblest vessel admitted to the books of the Royal Navy on D-Day. Prior to July 1942, these craft were referred to as "Assault Landing Craft" (ALC), but "Landing Craft; Assault" (LCA) was used thereafter to conform with the joint US-UK nomenclature system.

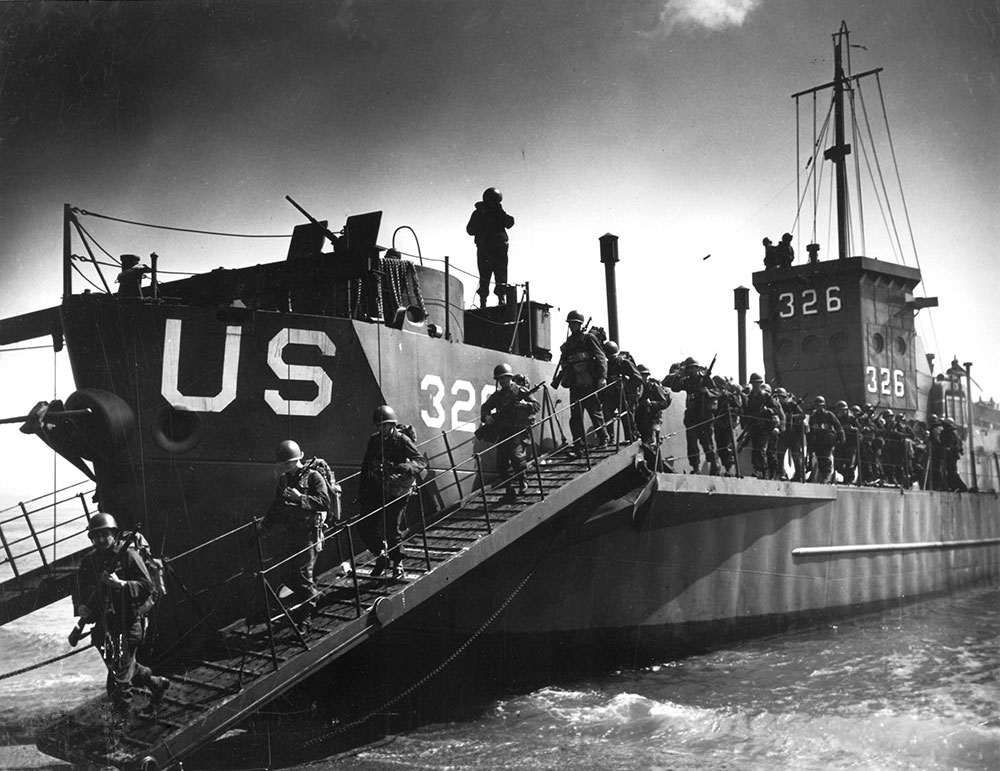
USS LCI-326, a Landing Craft Infantry, during training for D-Day

The Landing Craft Infantry was a stepped up amphibious assault ship, developed in response to a British request for a vessel capable of carrying and landing substantially more troops than the smaller Landing Craft Assault (LCA). The result was a small steel ship that could land 200 troops, traveling from rear bases on its own bottom at a speed of up to 15 knots (28 km/h; 17 mph). The original British design was envisioned as being a "one time use" vessel which would simply ferry the troops across the English Channel, and were considered an expendable vessel. As such, no troop sleeping accommodations were placed in the original design. This was changed shortly after initial use of these ships, when it was discovered that many missions would require overnight accommodations.

The first LCI(L)s entered service in 1943 chiefly with the Royal Navy (RN) and United States Navy. Some 923 LCI were built in ten American shipyards and 211 provided under lend-lease to the Royal Navy.

=== Specialized vehicle landing craft ===
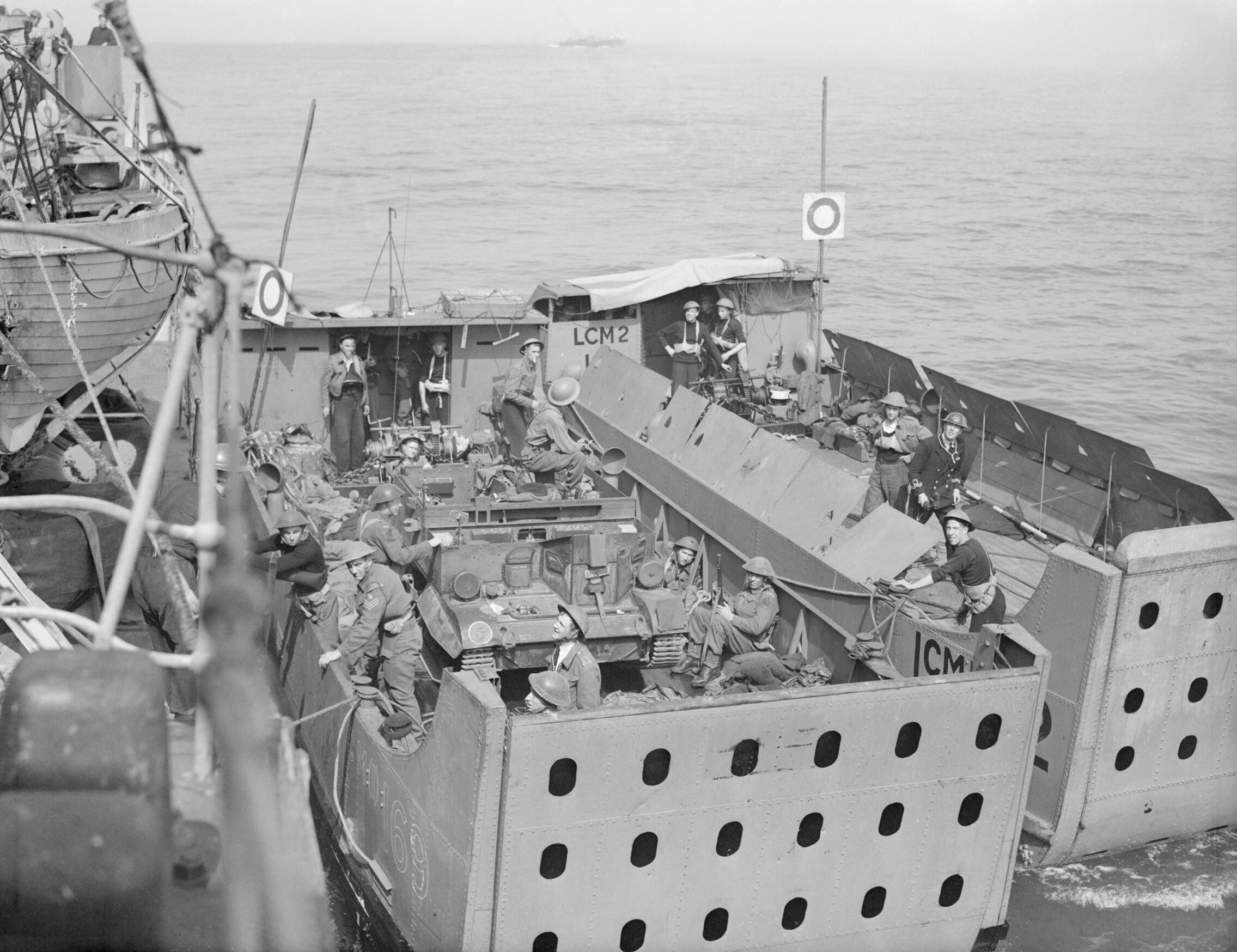
Two examples of the LCM 1 on returning to ships during the 1942 Dieppe Raid

Following the Inter-Service Training and Development Centre's (ISTDC) successful development of the infantry carrying LCA, attention turned to the means of efficiently delivering a tank to a beach in 1938. Enquiries were made of the army as to the heaviest tank that might be employed in a landing operation. The army wanted to be able to land a 12-ton tank, but the ISTDC, anticipating weight increases in future tank models specified 16 tons burthen for Mechanised Landing Craft designs. Another limit on any design was the need to land tanks and other vehicles in less than approximately 2 1/2 ft of water (0.76 m).

Design work began at John I. Thornycroft Ltd. in May 1938 with trials completing in February 1940. Constructed of steel and selectively clad with armour plate, this shallow-draft, barge-like boat with a crew of 6, could ferry a tank of 16 long tons to shore at 7 knots (13 km/h). Depending on the weight of the tank to be transported the craft might be lowered into the water by its davits already loaded or could have the tank placed in it after being lowered into the water.

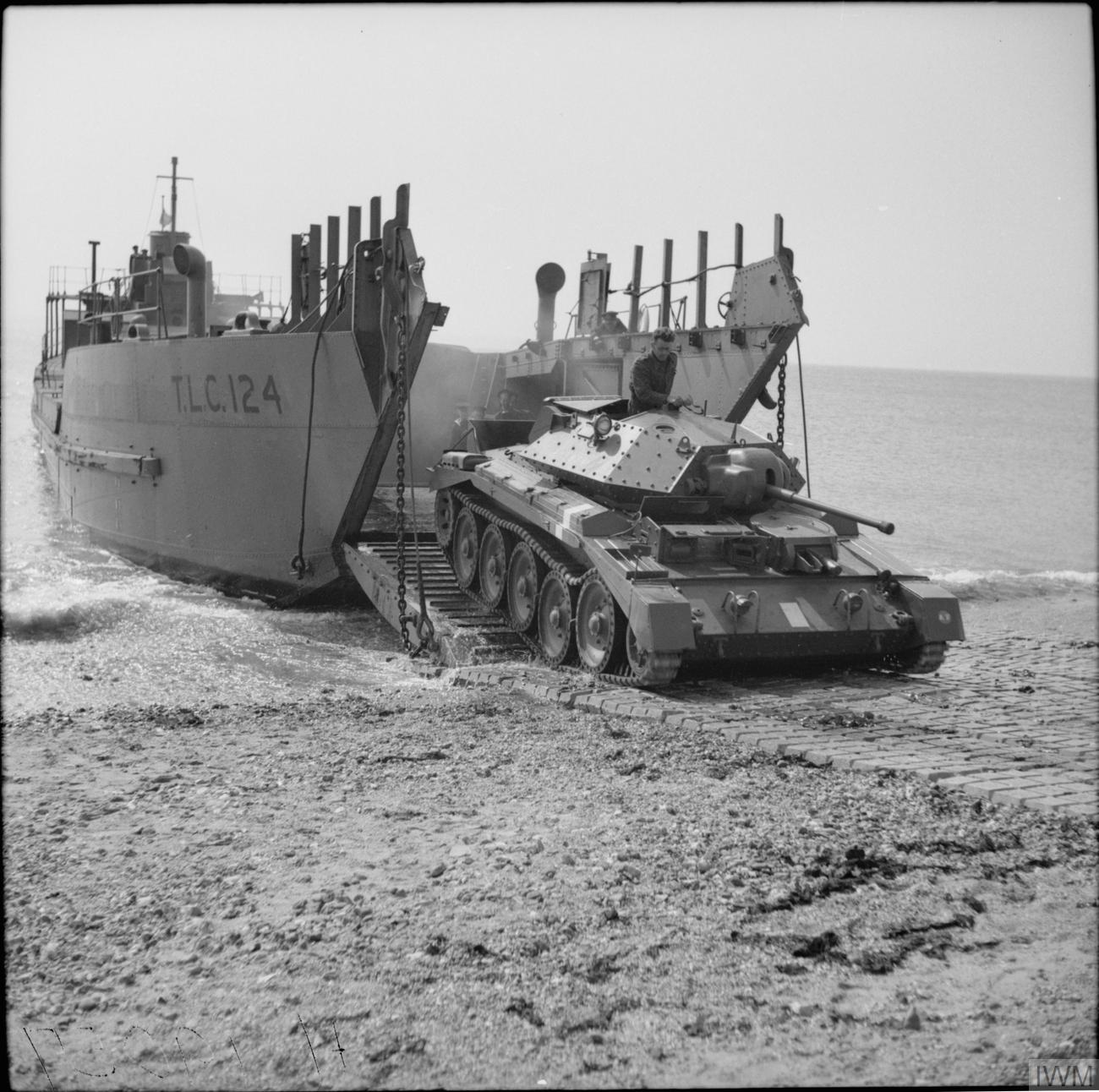
A Crusader I tank emerges from the Tank Landing Craft TLC-124, 26 April 1942

Although the Royal Navy had the Landing Craft Mechanised at its disposal, in 1940 Prime Minister Winston Churchill demanded an amphibious vessel capable of landing at least three 36-ton heavy tanks directly onto a beach, able to sustain itself at sea for at least a week, and inexpensive and easy to build. Admiral Maund, Director of the Inter-Service Training and Development Centre (which had developed the Landing Craft Assault), gave the job to naval architect Sir Roland Baker, who within three days completed initial drawings for a 152-foot (46 m) landing craft with a 29-foot (8.8 m) beam and a shallow draft. Ship builders Fairfields and John Brown agreed to work out details for the design under the guidance of the Admiralty Experimental Works at Haslar. Tank tests with models soon determined the characteristics of the craft, indicating that it would make 10 knots (19 km/h; 12 mph) on engines delivering about 700 hp (520 kW). Designated the LCT Mark 1, 20 were ordered in July 1940 and a further 10 in October 1940.

The first LCT Mark 1 was launched by Hawthorn Leslie in November 1940. It was an all-welded 372-ton steel-hulled vessel that drew only 3 feet (0.91 m) of water at the bow. Sea trials soon proved the Mark 1 to be difficult to handle and almost unmanageable in some sea conditions. The designers set about correcting the faults of the Mark 1 in the LCT Mark 2. It was longer and wider, with 15-and-20-pound (6.8 and 9.1 kg) armoured shielding added to the wheelhouse and gun tubs.

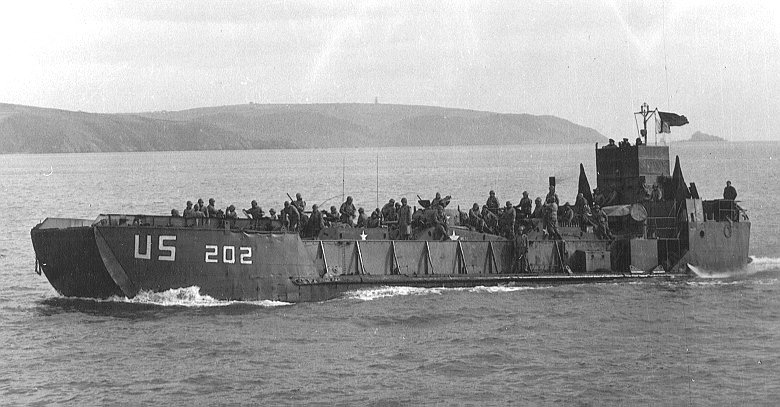
LCT-202 off the coast of England, 1944

The Mark 3 had an additional 32-foot (9.8 m) midsection that gave it a length of 192 feet (59 m) and a displacement of 640 tons. Even with this extra weight, the vessel was slightly faster than the Mark 1. The Mk.3 was accepted on 8 April 1941. The Mark 4 was slightly shorter and lighter than the Mk.3, but had a much wider beam (38 ft 9 in (11.81 m)) and was intended for cross channel operations as opposed to seagoing use. When tested in early assault operations, like the ill-fated Allied raid on Dieppe in 1942, the lack of manoeuvring ability led to the preference for a shorter overall length in future variants, most of which were built in the United States.

When the United States entered the war in December 1941, the U.S. Navy had no amphibious vessels at all, and found itself obliged to consider British designs already in existence. One of these, advanced by K.C. Barnaby of Thornycroft, was for a double-ended LCT to work with landing ships. The Bureau of Ships quickly set about drawing up plans for landing craft based on Barnaby's suggestions, although with only one ramp. The result, in early 1942, was the LCT Mark 5, a 117-foot (36 m) craft that could accommodate five 30-ton or four 40-ton tanks or 150 tons of cargo. This 286-ton landing craft could be shipped to combat areas in three separate water-tight sections aboard a cargo ship or carried pre-assembled on the flat deck of a Landing Ship, Tank (LST). The Mk.5 would be launched by heeling the LST on its beam to let the craft slide off its chocks into the sea, or cargo ships could lower each of the three sections into the sea where they were joined together.

=== Development of landing ships ===
Due to their small size, most amphibious ships and craft were not given names and were just given serial numbers, e.g., LCT 304. The LSTs and LSDs were an exception to this, since they were similar in size to a small cruiser. In addition, three British-built LSTs were named: HMS Boxer, HMS Bruiser and HMS Thruster; these were all larger than the U.S. design and had proper funnels.

==== Landing Ship, Tank ====
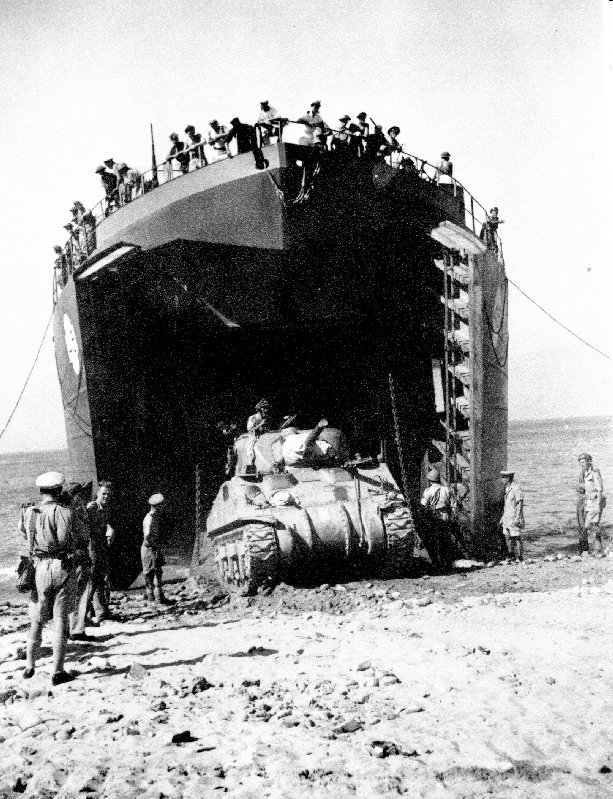
A Canadian LST off-loads an M4 Sherman during the Allied invasion of Sicily in 1943.

A further development was the Landing Ship, Tank designation, built to support amphibious operations by carrying significant quantities of vehicles, cargo, and landing troops directly onto an unimproved shore. The British evacuation from Dunkirk in 1940 demonstrated to the Admiralty that the Allies needed relatively large, ocean-going ships capable of shore-to-shore delivery of tanks and other vehicles in amphibious assaults upon the continent of Europe. The first purpose-built LST design was HMS Boxer. To carry 13 Churchill infantry tanks, 27 vehicles and nearly 200 men (in addition to the crew) at a speed of 18 knots, it could not have the shallow draught that would have made for easy unloading. As a result, each of the three (Boxer, Bruiser, and Thruster) ordered in March 1941 had a very long ramp stowed behind the bow doors.

In November 1941, a small delegation from the British Admiralty arrived in the United States to pool ideas with the United States Navy's Bureau of Ships with regard to development of ships and also including the possibility of building further Boxers in the US. During this meeting, it was decided that the Bureau of Ships would design these vessels. The LST(2) design incorporated elements of the first British LCTs from their designer, Sir Rowland Baker, who was part of the British delegation. This included sufficient buoyancy in the ships' sidewalls that they would float even with the tank deck flooded. The LST(2) gave up the speed of HMS Boxer at only 10 knots but had a similar load while drawing only 3 feet forward when beaching.

Congress provided the authority for the construction of LSTs along with a host of other auxiliaries, destroyer escorts, and assorted landing craft. The enormous building program quickly gathered momentum. Such a high priority was assigned to the construction of LSTs that the previously laid keel of an aircraft carrier was hastily removed to make room for several LSTs to be built in her place. The keel of the first LST was laid down on 10 June 1942 at Newport News, Va., and the first standardized LSTs were floated out of their building dock in October. Twenty-three were in commission by the end of 1942. Lightly armored, they could steam cross the ocean with a full load on their own power, carrying infantry, tanks and supplies directly onto the beaches. Together with 2,000 other landing craft, the LSTs gave the troops a protected, quick way to make combat landings, beginning in summer 1943.

==== Landing Ship, Dock ====
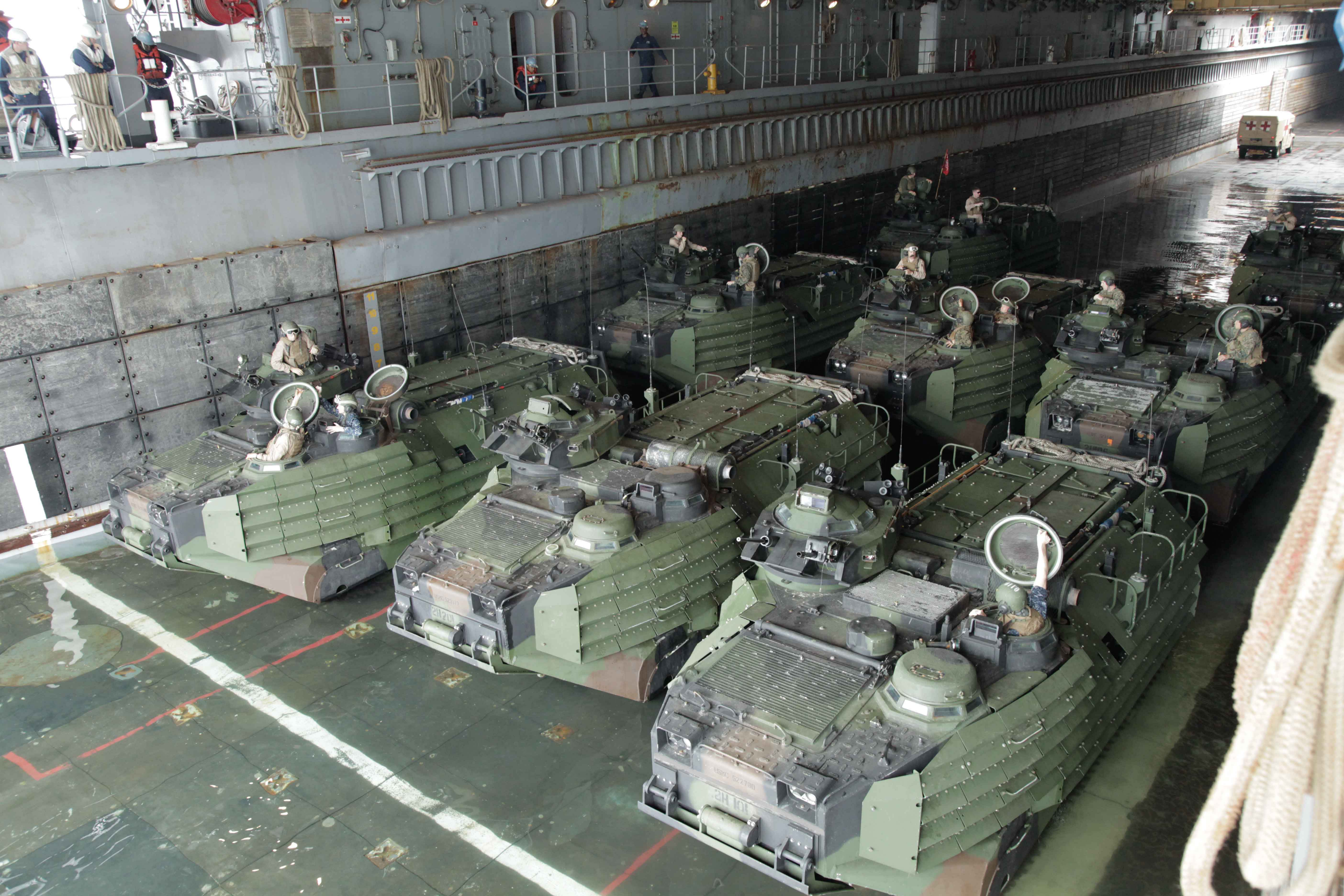
Amphibious vehicles inside a US LSD

The Landing Ship Dock (LSD) came as a result of a British requirement for a vessel that could carry large landing craft across the seas at speed. The first LSD came from a design by Sir Roland Baker and was an answer to the problem of launching small craft rapidly. The "Landing Ship Stern Chute", which was a converted train ferry, was an early attempt. Thirteen Landing Craft Mechanized (LCM) could be launched from these ships down the chute. The Landing Ship Gantry was a converted tanker with a crane to transfer its cargo of landing craft from deck to sea—15 LCMs in a little over half an hour.

The design was developed and built in the US for the USN and the Royal Navy. The LSD could carry 36 LCM at 16 knots. It had a large open compartment at the back. Opening a stern door and flooding special compartments opened this area to the sea so that LCI-sized vessels could enter or leave. It took one and a half hours for the dock to be flooded down and two and half to pump it out. When flooded they could also be used as docks for repairs to small craft.

=== Other ===
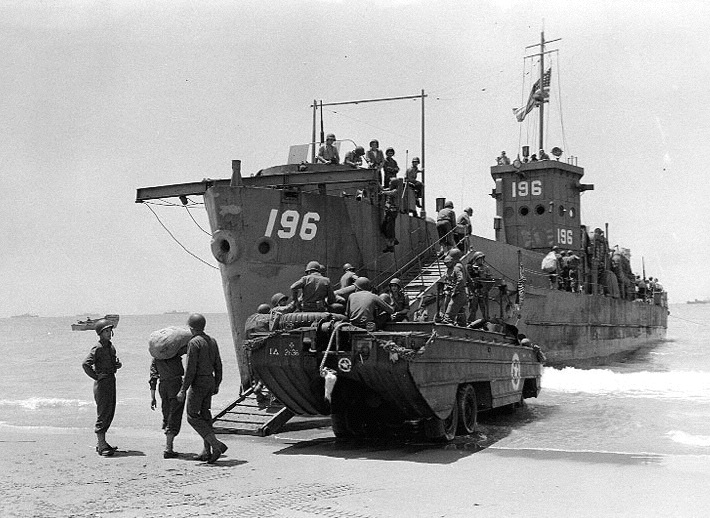
LCI(L) 196 and a DUKW during the Invasion of Sicily 1943 (World War II)

==== Landing Craft Navigation (LCN) ====
Nine-ton Landing Craft Navigation (LCN) were used by British "Combined Operations Assault Pilotage Parties" (Royal Marine and Special Boat Service crew) for surveying landing sites. After the Second World War the Royal Netherlands Navy acquired four LCNs that entered Dutch service in 1946.

==== Landing Craft Control (LCC) ====
The Landing Craft Control (LCC) were 56-foot (17 m) U.S. Navy vessels, carrying only the crew (Scouts and Raiders) and newly developed radar. Their main job was to find and follow the safe routes in to the beach, which were lanes that had been cleared of obstacles and mines. There were eight in the entire Normandy invasion (two per beach). After leading in the first wave, they were to head back out and bring in the second wave. After that, they were used as all-purpose command and control assets during the invasion.

==== Amphibious vehicles ====
Very small landing craft, or amphibians, were designed. The U.S.-designed Landing Vehicle Tracked, was an amphibious (and sometimes armored) personnel carrier. These were operated by Army personnel, not naval crews and had a capacity of about three tons. The British introduced their own amphibian, the Terrapin.

=== Fire support craft ===
It was soon realized that battleships, cruisers and destroyers could not necessarily provide all the fire support (including suppressive fire) that an amphibious assault might need. Therefore, specialized vessels were developed that incorporated various direct and indirect fire weapons. These included guns and rockets which could be mounted on landing craft and landing ships. As part of the final barrage before an assault, the landing area would be plastered by these types.

Amphibious landing craft of WWII were generally fitted out with minimal weaponry. LCA crews were issued with .303 inch Lewis Guns, which were mounted in a light machine gun shelter on the forward-port side of the craft; these could be used both as anti-aircraft protection and against shore targets. Later models were fitted with two 2-inch mortars, and two Lewis or .303 Bren light machine guns. LCM 1 crews were issued with Lewis guns, and many LCM 3s had .50 in (12.7 mm) Browning machine guns mounted for anti-aircraft protection. Opportunities for troops on board to use their own weapons presented themselves.

LCIs and LCTs carried heavier weapons, such as the Oerlikon 20 mm cannon, on each side of the bridge structure. LSTs had a somewhat heavier armament.

Some landing craft were converted for special purposes either to provide defence for the other landing craft in the attack or as support weapons during the landing.

==== Landing Craft Assault (Hedgerow) ====
The LCA(HR) was a converted British LCA. It carried a battery of 24 spigot mortars, the Royal Navy's Hedgehog anti-submarine weapon, instead of personnel. The mortars were fired as a barrage onto the beach to clear mines and other obstructions. Having discharged its mortars and its duty, the LCA(HR) would leave the beach area. They were towed to the beach by larger craft, such as the LCTs that carried the Royal Engineer assault teams with their specialist vehicles and equipment, who would complete the beach clearance.

Three flotillas (of 18, 18 and 9 craft) were used at Juno, Gold and Sword beaches.

==== Landing Craft Flak ====
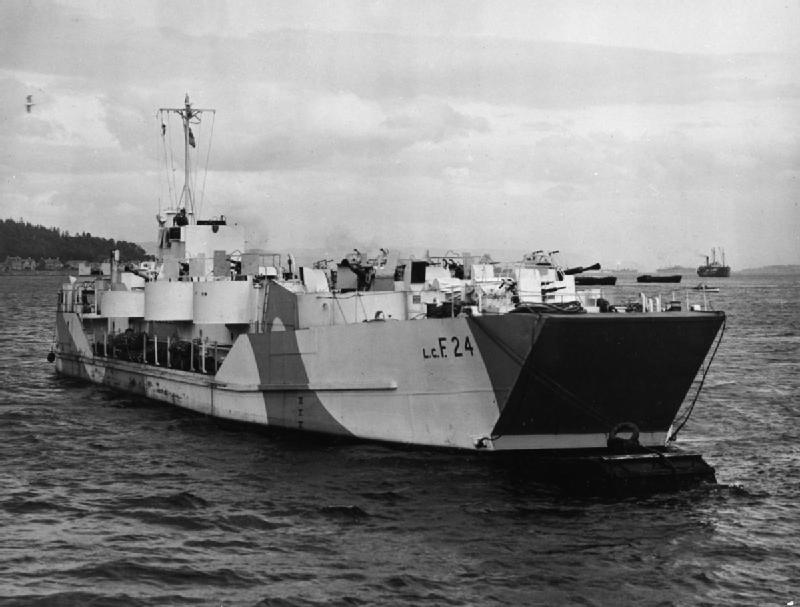
Landing Craft Flak were equipped with 20 mm Oerlikons and four QF 2 pdr "pom-poms" to defend against aircraft.

The Landing Craft Flak (LCF) was a conversion of the LCT that was intended to give anti-aircraft support to the landing. They were first used in the Dieppe Raid early in 1942. The ramp was welded shut, and a deck built on top of the Tank deck. They were equipped with several light anti-aircraft guns—a typical fitting was eight 20 mm Oerlikons and four QF 2 pdr "pom-poms" and had a crew of 60. On British examples, the operation of the craft was the responsibility of RN crew and the guns were manned by Royal Marines. They carried two naval officers and two marine officers.

==== Landing Craft Gun ====
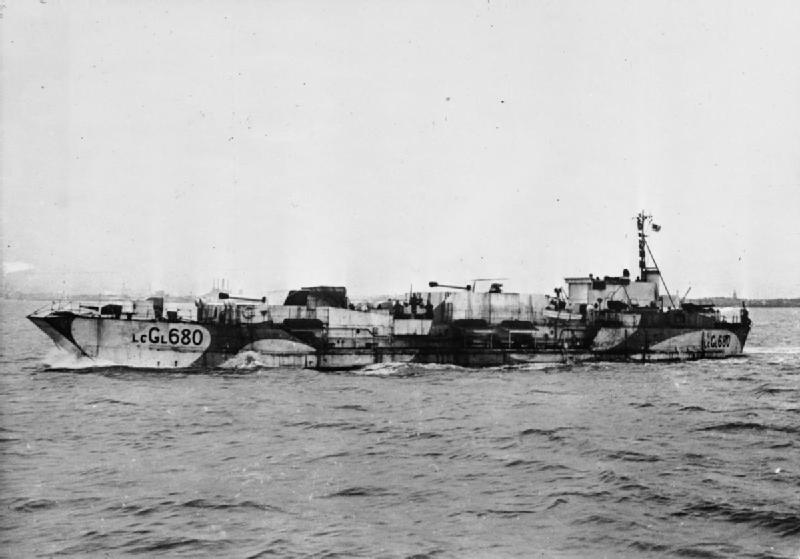
Landing Craft Gun (Large) 680 carried two 4.7-inch naval guns

The Landing Craft Gun (LCG) was another LCT conversion intended to give supporting fire to the landing. Apart from the Oerlikon armament of a normal LCT, each LCG(Medium) had two British Army 25 pounder gun-howitzers in armoured mountings, while LCG(L)3 and LCG(L)4 both had two 4.7-inch naval guns (12 cm). Crewing was similar to the LCF. LCGs played a very important part in the Walcheren operations in October 1944.

==== Landing Craft Rocket ====
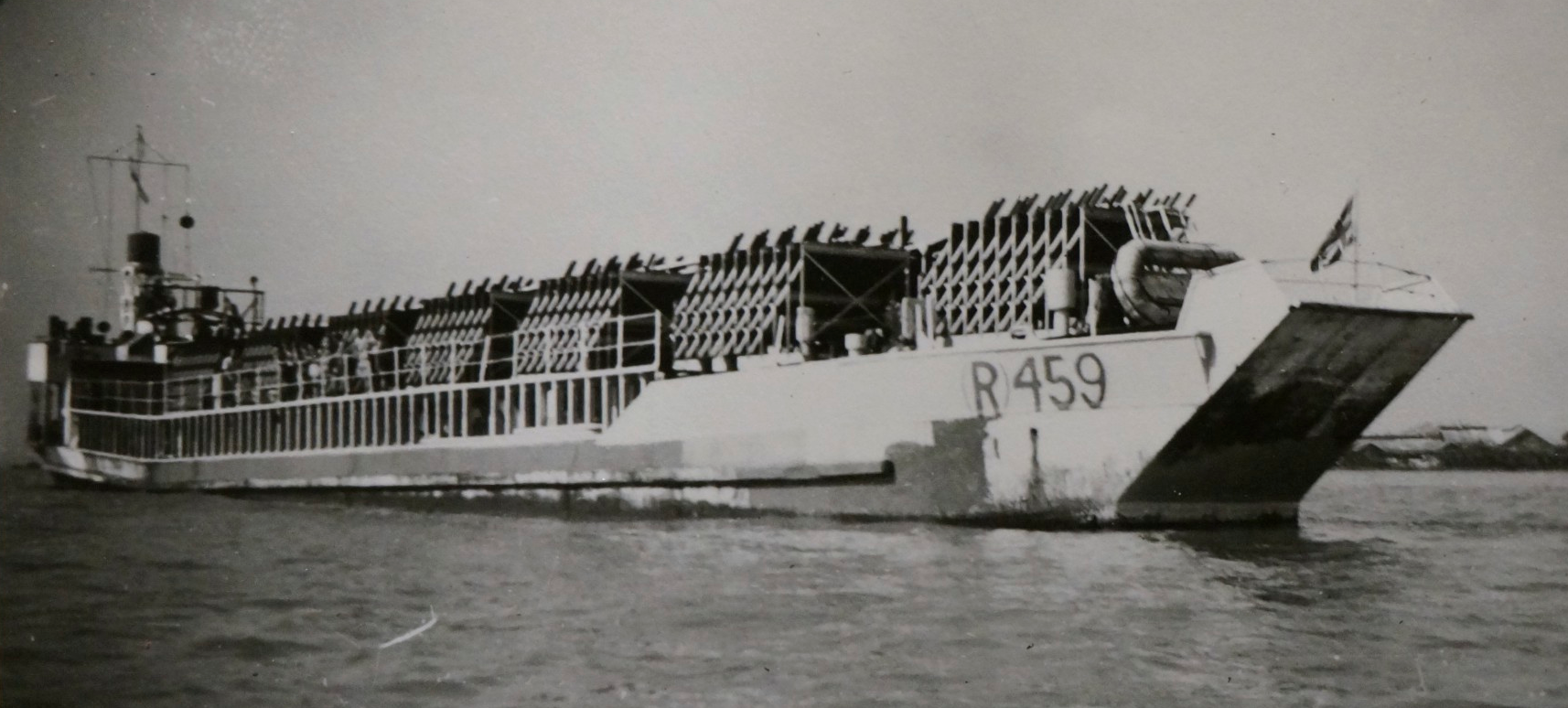
LCT (R) 459

The Landing Craft Tank (Rocket), LCT(R), was an LCT modified to carry a large set of launchers for the British RP-3 "60 lb" rockets mounted on the covered-over tank deck. The full set of launchers was "in excess of" 1,000 and 5,000 reloads were kept below. The firepower was claimed to be equivalent to 80 light cruisers or 200 destroyers.

The method of operation was to anchor off the target beach, pointing towards the shore. The distance to the shore was then measured by radar and the elevation of the launchers set accordingly. The crew then vanished below (apart from the commanding officer who retreated to a special cubby hole to control things) and the launch was then set off electrically. The launch could comprise the entire set or individual ranks of rockets.

A full reload was a very labor-intensive operation and at least one LCT(R) went alongside a cruiser and got a working party from the larger ship to assist in the process.

==== Landing Craft Support ====
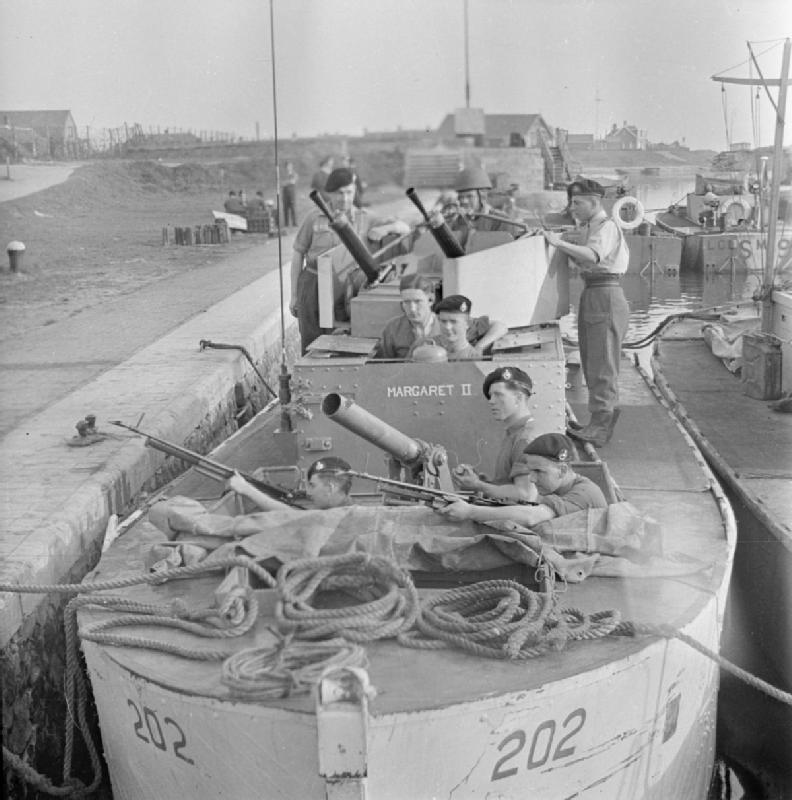
Royal Marines of Force T manning an LCS (M) in South West Holland

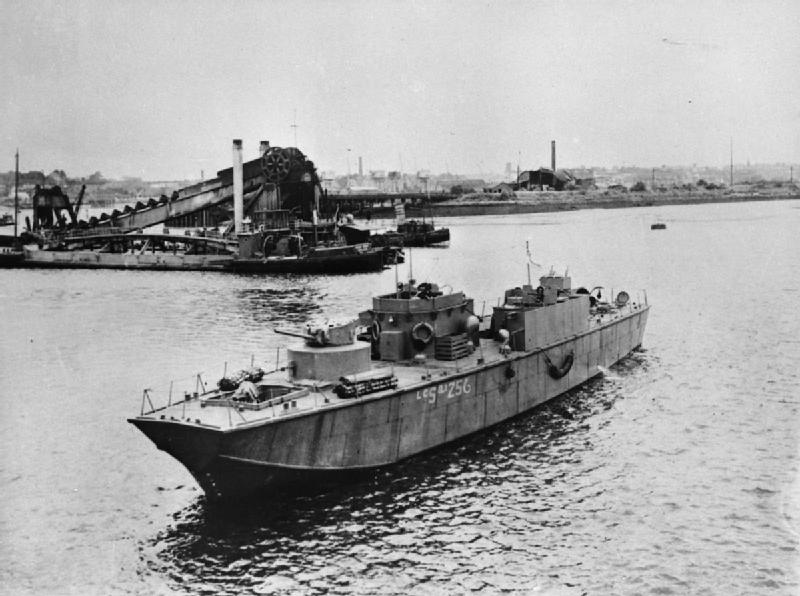
Landing Craft Support (Large) was armed with an anti-tank gun in a turret.

The Landing Craft Support was used to give some firepower close in.

The Landing Craft Support (Medium) (LCS(M)), Mark 2 and Mark 3 were used by the British forces at Normandy. The crew was Royal Navy, with Royal Marines to operate the weapons: two 0.5 inch Vickers machine guns and a 4-inch mortar to fire smoke shells.

The Fairmile H Landing Craft Support (Large) had armour added to its wooden hull and a turret with an anti-tank gun fitted. The LCS(L) Mark 1 had a Daimler armoured car turret with its QF 2–pdr (40 mm) gun. The Mark 2 had a QF 6–pdr (57 mm) anti–tank gun.

The American Landing Craft Support was larger, each was armed with a 3-inch gun (7.6 cm), various smaller guns, and ten MK7 rocket launchers.

=== Inflatable landing craft ===
Inflatable boats were often used to transport amphibious troops from high speed transports and submarines. The United States used a 7-man Landing Craft, Rubber (Small) (LCR-S) and a 10-man Landing Craft, Rubber (Large) (LCR-L).

The first and last instances of the large use of rubber boats in amphibious operations in World War II were the Makin Island raid in 1942 and the landing of the 1st Battalion 6th Marines Battle of Tarawa in 1943 where the Battalion commander Major William K. Jones was nicknamed "Admiral of the Condom Fleet".

=== Landing Craft Group and wartime training ===
After Pearl Harbor, the U.S. Army and Navy began intense planning for the transport of millions of men into combat and the training for amphibious operations. By June 1942, Amphibious Force, Atlantic Fleet (AFAF) established headquarters at Norfolk (Virginia) under the command of Admiral Henry Kent Hewitt. Temporary headquarters for a transport command were set up in an old American Export Line transport ship that had been built for the Army in World War I. Within the transport command, a Landing Craft Group was created to prepare the crews of landing ships.

"The training of landing craft crews under the direction of Captain W.P.O. Clarke began at the end of June 1942," according to Naval historian Samuel Eliot Morison. Clarke was given orders to "secure, organize, and train crews for approximately 1,800 landing craft" including LSTs and LCIs, which at that time were still in the design phase.

To man and support such landing craft, the Navy ordered that 30,000 men and 3,000 officers be trained in a matter of months, but initially the Landing Craft Group consisted only of Capt. Clarke, two officers and a yeoman. In creating training programs, Clarke studied blueprints for the new craft and "from these paper drawings he prepared ship's organizations for each type. This was the first textbook for crews assigned to the large landing craft. From this, they were to be trained in what their duties were to be, what the ship would be like, and how it would be expected to operate."

In August 1942, Capt. Clarke was told about Operation Torch and secret plans to invade North Africa the following November. He had only a few months to train thousands of men, most of whom were just out of indoctrination school. "They were the butchers, the bakers, and the light bulb makers of American youth. War was new to them, and organized Navy life was strange," observed Lt. Eric Burton, a Naval officer who wrote By Sea and by Land, a semi-official account published during the War about amphibious combat.

Capt. Clarke created hydrographic, maintenance, medical, and communications training programs, and a section to train Army shore parties how to unload landing craft. He set up a training facility at Solomons Island, and held exercises on the shores of the Chesapeake Bay around the clock, day and night.

On 1 September 1942, the Amphibious Force and its Landing Craft Group rented the Nansemond Hotel, a popular resort hotel on Virginia Beach near Norfolk, to use as a headquarters building. Eventually, 40 major amphibious operations would be planned at the old hotel. For several weeks, Gen. George S. Patton worked on plans for the invasion of North Africa out of the Nansemond.

"Captain Clarke had less than two months, about one-third of what had been considered the minimum, to train these men to conduct night ship-to-shore landings," wrote Samuel Eliot Morison about the preparations for Operation Torch. "Considering the time limitations, his performance was remarkable." Clarke was awarded the Legion of Merit for the accomplishment. According to the Presidential citation, he and the Landing Craft Group "brought these ships and craft to a high state of readiness for combat operations in all subsequent major amphibious operations in the Atlantic, Pacific, and Mediterranean theatres.

== Early Cold War developments ==
=== Landing Craft Utility (LCU) ===
A Landing Craft Utility (LCU) was used to transport equipment and troops to the shore. It was capable of transporting tracked or wheeled vehicles and troops from amphibious assault ships to beachheads or piers. It was the direct successor of the LCT, and surviving U.S. LCTs from WW2 were redesignated LCMs.

=== Helicopters ===
Despite all the progress that was seen during World War II, there were still fundamental limitations in the types of coastline that were suitable for assault. Beaches had to be relatively free of obstacles, and have the right tidal conditions and the correct slope. The development of the helicopter fundamentally changed the equation.

The first use of helicopters in an amphibious assault came during the Anglo-French-Israeli invasion of Egypt in 1956 (the Suez War). Two British light fleet carriers were pressed into service to carry helicopters, and a battalion-sized airborne assault was made. Two of the other carriers involved, HMS Bulwark and HMS Albion, were converted in the late 1950s into dedicated "commando carriers".

The US Navy built five Iwo Jima-class landing platform helicopter vessels in the 1950s and 1960s, and various converted fleet and escort carriers for the purpose of providing a helicopter amphibious assault capability. The first of the type envisaged was the escort carrier USS Block Island, which never actually saw service as an amphibious assault ship. Delays in the construction of the Iwo Jima class saw other conversions made as a stopgap measure; three Essex-class aircraft carriers (Boxer, Princeton, and Valley Forge) and one Casablanca-class escort carrier (Thetis Bay) were converted into Boxer and Thetis Bay class amphibious assault vessels. Helicopter amphibious assault techniques were developed further by American forces in the Vietnam War and refined during training exercises.

== Current landing craft ==
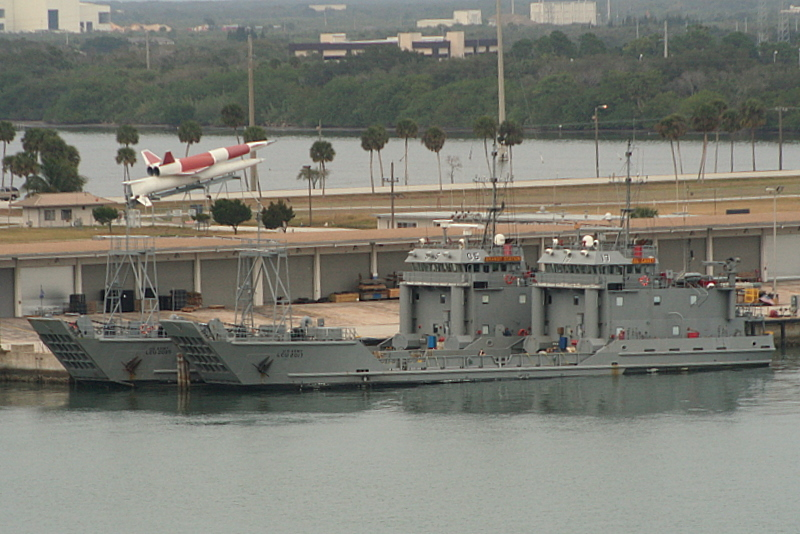
United States Army ships Brandy Station (LCU-2005) and El Caney (LCU-2017) docked in Port Canaveral, Florida

=== Amphibious mechanized utility and landing craft ===
Mechanized utility and landing craft were the kind used during the second world war and, while the mechanized landing craft of today are similar in construction, many improvements have been made. For example, landing craft (such as the LCM-8 of the US Navy) are capable of a military lift of 183 metric tons (180 long tons) at a speed of 22 km/h (14 mph), carrying even heavy equipment, such as M1 Abrams tanks. Landing craft can mount several machine guns or similar weapons for the defense of troops and/or vehicle crews inside.

=== Air-cushioned landing craft ===
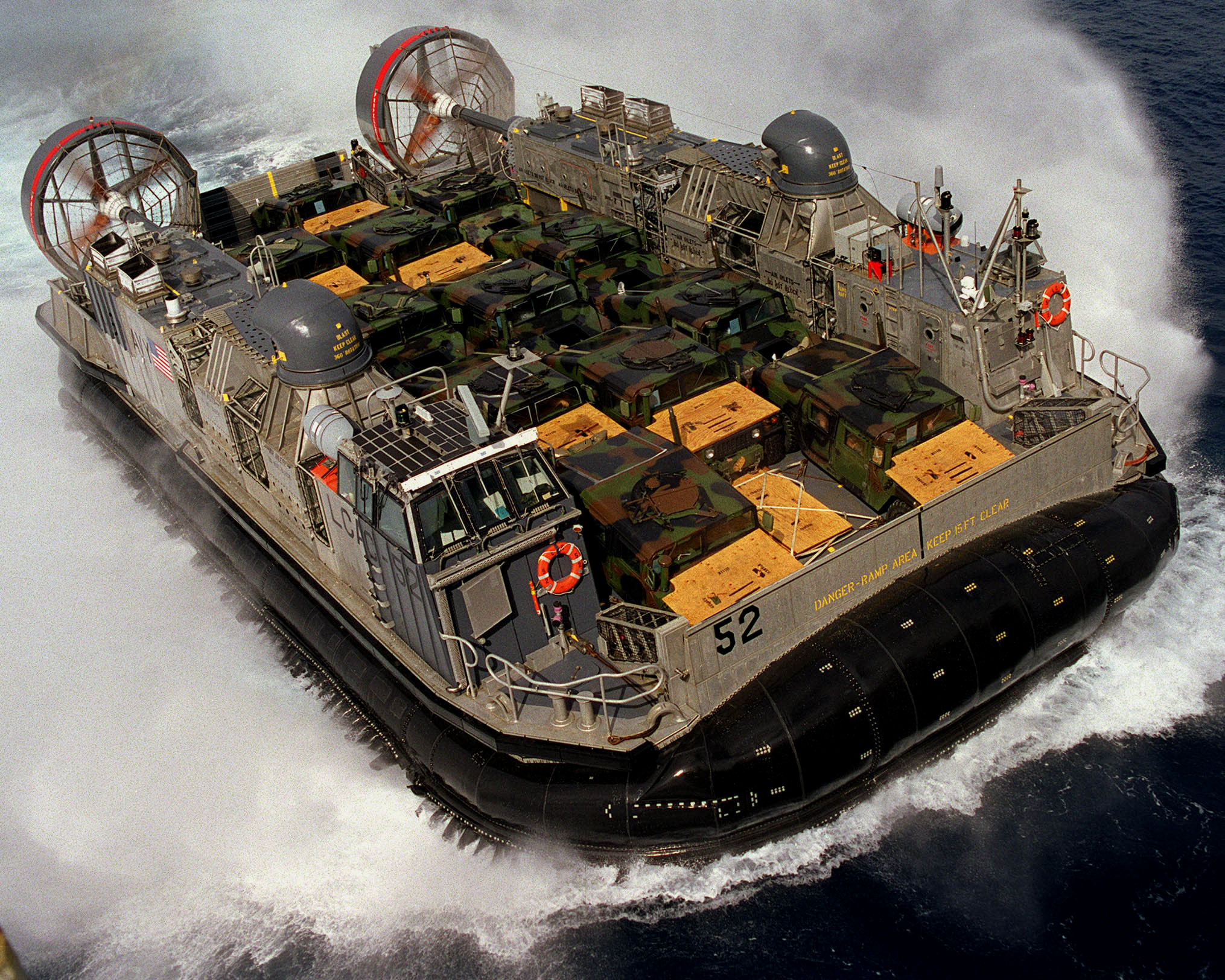
USN LCAC

The air-cushioned landing craft (Landing Craft Air Cushion, or LCAC in the US Navy) is based on small to mid-sized multi-purpose hovercraft, Also known as "over the beach" ("OTB") craft, they allow troops and material to access more than 70 percent of the world's coastline, while only approximately 15 percent of that coastline is available to conventional landing craft. Like the mechanized landing craft, they are usually equipped with mounted machine guns, although they also support grenade launchers and heavy weapons. These vehicles are commonly used in the United States Navy, the Royal Navy, the Russian Navy, and the Hellenic Navy.

== Landing barges ==
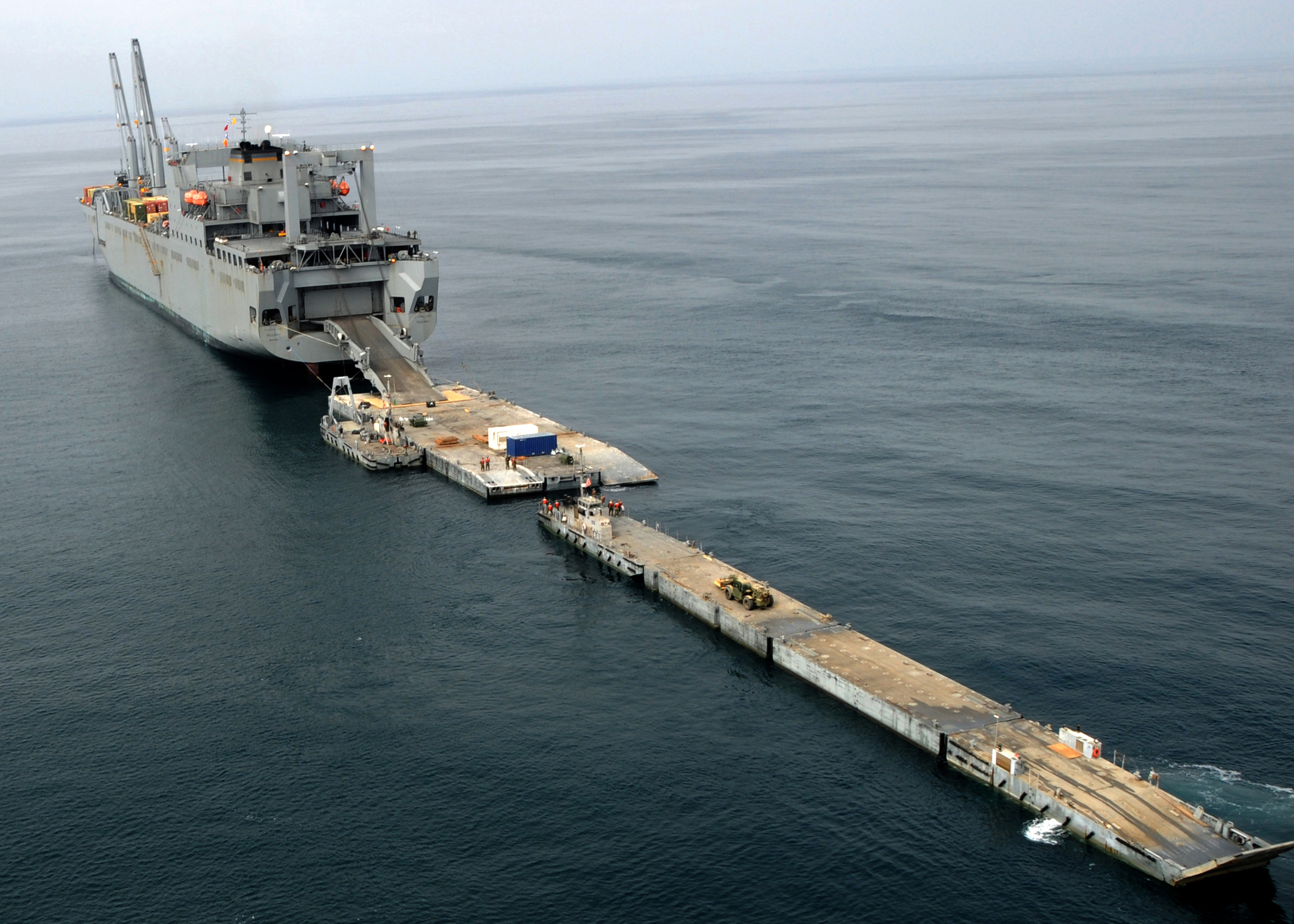
US Navy lighterage system – modern landing barges

Landing barges were adaptations of British Thames barges and lighters as landing craft. In size, they came between the landing craft and landing ships. They were used at all beaches during the landings at Normandy and were manned by British crews.

Some were fitted with engines, while others were towed to the beach. They were used for defence, transportation, supply (food, water and oil) and repair (fitted out with workshops).

Those fitted for vehicle carrying had a ramp fitted in place at the rear and they had to back onto beaches. They would work from ships and coasters to the shore and back.

Two flotillas were made up of "flak barges" to provide defence of the beaches. Like landing craft, flak barges carried A/A guns: two 40 mm Bofors and two 20 mm Oerlikon, with army gunners and naval crew.

The Landing Barge, Kitchen (LBK) was fitted with a large superstructure containing the galley. With a crew of 20 plus, they could carry food for 800 for a week and provide 1,600 hot and 800 cold meals a day, including freshly baked bread.

== See also ==
- Balikpapan-class landing craft heavy
- LCM-1E
- Mark 8 Landing Craft Tank
- Ramped craft logistic
