= LBK (disambiguation) =

LBK refers to Linearbandkeramik or Linear Pottery culture, a European Neolithic archaeological horizon.

LBK may also refer to:

- Landing Barge, Kitchen, a class of Royal Navy vessel
- Ljusdals BK, a bandy club in Sweden
- LBK, National Rail station code for Long Buckby railway station, England
- LBK, informal abbreviation for Lubbock, Texas
- Left Below Knee, a category of amputation
- Long Buckby railway station, station code
- Lake Bernadette Killas, a category of buds for life
- Lynbrook railway station, Melbourne
