= Landing Barge, Kitchen =

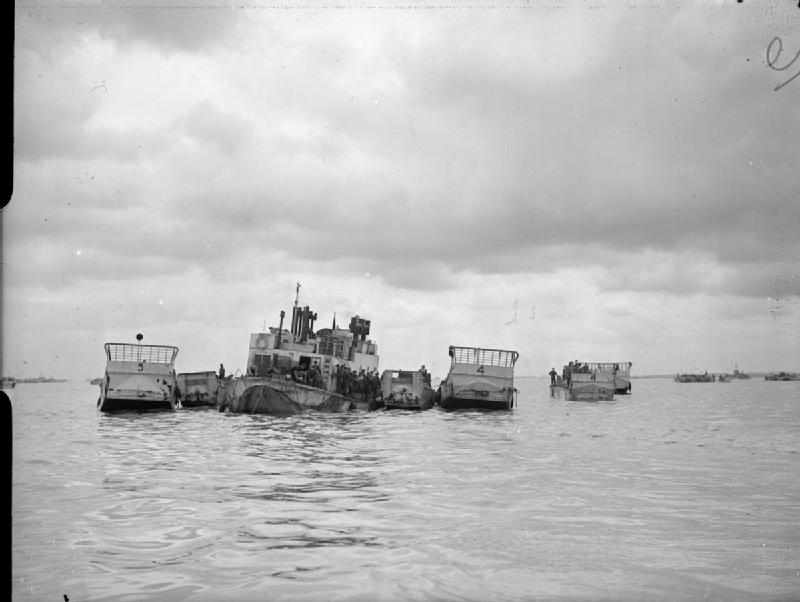
- A Landing Barge, Kitchen amid LCVs and LCM(3)s during the Invasion of Normandy, 1944.

Class overview
- Name: Landing Barge, Kitchen
- Operators: Royal Navy
- In service: 1944-45
- Completed: 10
- Lost: 1 (in 1945)

General characteristics
- Type: Landing craft
- Length: 79 ft (24 m) oa
- Beam: 21 ft (6.4 m)
- Draft: approximately 3.5 ft (1.1 m)
- Ramps: None
- Propulsion: 2x Chrysler RM 65 bhp petrol engines
- Speed: 6 to 7 knots
- Endurance: 300 miles at 5 knots
- Capacity: storage and serving space for enough provisions to feed 900 men for one week
- Crew: 1 officer, 24 ratings
- Armament: None
- Armour: 2½ inch "Plastic" to diesel fuel tanks, engines, and steering shelter
- Notes: most statistics from US Navy ONI 226 Allied Landing Craft and Ships, US Government Printing Office, 1944

The Landing Barge, Kitchen or LBK was a landing craft used to support amphibious landings in North Western Europe during and after the Normandy invasion in the Second World War. Its primary purpose was to provide hot meals to the crews of the many minor landing craft not fitted with galley facilities. Constructed of steel, this shallow-draft lighter had storage and serving space to feed 900 men for one week. The kitchen capacity was able to provide 1,600 hot meals and 800 cold meals a day.

== Origins ==
In early 1942, the Royal Navy found itself in need of much greater landing capacity in order to provide lift for the Allied 1942 and 1943 invasion plans; Round Up and Sledgehammer. The landing craft construction programme in Britain was incapable of providing sufficient craft so quickly, and US production had not yet come into full swing. Thames lighters were drafted into service to supplement the purpose-built landing craft. Thames lighters were known for their shallow draft and hold capacity, and they were soon fitted with some modest armour protection, engines, and ramps.

These landing barges were not intended for the initial assault, but to support the following build-up.

== Design ==
Gordon Holman, referring to the Landing Barge, Kitchen as an LCK, described it as having "the appearance of a houseboat which somebody had attempted to turn into a factory. Chimneys, with square cowls on them, rose up from all parts of the vessel. But when the L.C.K. made smoke nobody complained.” The LBK was meant to be a floating kitchen. It had oil-fired ranges, automatic potato peelers, refrigerated meat lockers, four ovens in the aft end of its kitchen space, storage for bulk and perishable goods forward, and a 10-ton fresh water storage tank housed in the hold with additional fresh and sea water tanks above decks. It could hold sufficient provisions to feed 900 men for a week.

The LBK's overall dimensions were 79 feet long, by 21 feet wide. The hull was built of steel (as was the superstructure), with a swim (overhanging) hull at bow and stern. It had all the proportions of a Thames lighter; a broad-beamed, shallow draft (3½ ft.), flat-bottom, and was generally built for wear and tear.

In a deck-level overview, from bow to stern, the LBK had a blunt rounded prow directly behind which stood two hand winches and just further aft a hatch to the under-deck level. Within 20 feet the hull had achieved its full width of 21 feet. The foremost section of the deckhouse contained the 17-foot, 6-inch servery area (approximately 16-foot width), where the cooked food was portioned into containers for distribution. The middle section of the deckhouse was the 25 foot galley (approximately 16-foot width). Accommodation for the one officer aft, over the engines. At deck level aft was the steering shelter which, along with the various fuel tanks, was provided with 2.5-inch plastic armour.

In a below deck-level overview, from bow to stern, the LBK had a port and a starboard coal bunker, and then, on the portside, a ratings’ washroom. To starboard were two toilets or heads which, having no lower venting to the sea, required emptying by the crew. In the after section of the hull the two Chrysler 65 bhp "Royal" six-cylinder marine petrol engines gave the LBK a maximum speed of 6–7 knots. The estimated endurance was 300 miles at 5 knots on 600 gallons of petrol carried in tanks fitted in the after peak.

A total of ten vessels were fitted out as kitchen barges, while similar lighters were converted to oil (LBO), water (LBW), and engineering (LBE) barges to support the requirements of the small craft of the invasion fleet.

== Manning the LBK ==
Soon after the initial campaigns of the war, the Royal Navy’s landing craft and barges were normally crewed by hostilities-only ratings, personnel of the Royal Naval Patrol Service, and officers and ratings of the Royal Navy Volunteer Reserve (RNVR). Approximately 43,500 hostilities-only and 5,500 RNVR officers and ratings crewed the various landing craft types in 1944. Of these, the Royal Canadian Navy provided 60 officers and 300 ratings, on the condition that they be formed into specifically Canadian companies. None of the LBKs were manned by RCN crews, however. The Royal Marines also provided landing craft crews, but also none crewed LBKs. Although some other Landing Barge types were manned by Royal Army Service Corps water transport units, all of the LBKs were manned by the Royal Navy personnel.

Crew complement was 24 or 25 men, including the officer commanding. These officers were midshipmen or sub-lieutenants. The ratings included thirteen cooks, nine seamen and three stokers. The senior cook might be a chief petty officer, but, at the beginning of the Normandy invasion, the majority of the crews would not have had much sea experience. As the LBKs' duties involved long periods moored, and the cooking staff were often fully employed making meals, the seamen were often drafted in as “spud bashers”.

== Service history ==
Landing Barges, Kitchen were present in all invasion areas in the Normandy landings. Each barge had storage and serving space for enough provisions to feed 900 men for one week. The kitchen capacity was able to provide 1,600 hot meals and 800 cold meals a day. The menu could include roast beef, Yorkshire pudding, roast pork or cottage pie, cabbage or peas, and baked potatoes or roast potatoes, followed by stewed apples or other fruit and custard. These meals were placed in heat-retaining containers (insulated tin canisters) for dispatch to the crews of small craft. Also accompanying these containers would be one gallon "safari jars" (vacuum flasks) of soup, coffee, or tea. Among the craft thus supplied would be LCMs, special variants of the LCVP, and supply and repair barges. Larger craft would likely have galleys of their own and LCAs and LCVPs generally had mother ships where LC crews would be fed.

LBK also supported coastal and landing craft flotillas during the Battle of the Scheldt.

== See also ==
- Landing Craft Assault
- Landing Craft Mechanized
- Landing Ship, Infantry
- LCP (L)
- LCM (1)
- LCVP (United States)
