= Motor landing craft =

British landing craft

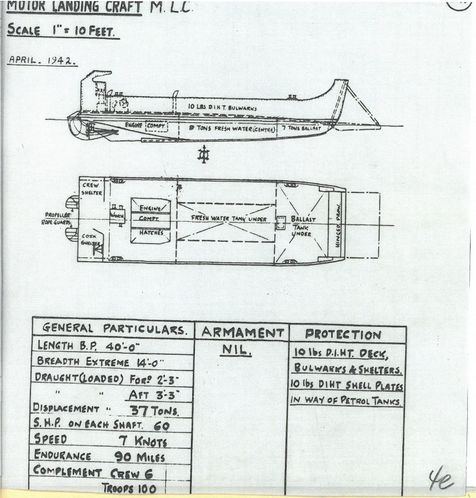
- Motor landing craft prints from 1942

Class overview
- Builders: J. Samuel White of Cowes
- Operators: Royal Navy
- Preceded by: Lighters and Horse Boats
- Succeeded by: LCM (1)
- Built: 1926–1938
- Completed: 9
- Lost: all (1939–1945)

General characteristics
- Type: Landing craft
- Displacement: 20 long tons (20,321 kg)
- Draught: 4.5 ft (1.4 m)
- Ramps: 1
- Propulsion: 1x Hotchkiss petrol engine, water jet propulsion
- Speed: 5–6 kn (9.3–11.1 km/h; 5.8–6.9 mph)
- Capacity: 10 long tons (10,160 kg)
- Armament: None
- Armour: None 1926. In 1936, bulletproof plate added to steering shelter

The motor landing craft (MLC) was a vessel used in the 1920s and 30s. It was specifically designed to deliver a tank to shore and may be considered the predecessor of all Allied landing craft mechanised (LCM). The MLC also saw action in the first year of the Second World War. Its primary purpose was to ferry tanks, troops and stores from ships to shore. The craft derived from discussions of the Landing Craft Committee; the prototype was designed by J. Samuel White of Cowes.

Manufactured of steel, this shallow-draught, barge-like boat could ferry its cargo to shore at a speed of up to five knots. For a short journey, from shore to shore, the cargo could be rolled or carried into the boat over its ramp. On longer journeys, ship to shore, a derrick would lower the MLC into the sea from the transporting vessel. The derrick would then lower the vehicle or cargo load. Upon touching down on shore, soldiers or vehicles exited by the bow ramp.

== Design and development ==
In Britain, the need for a purpose-built landing craft had been apparent to military and naval staff officers since the Gallipoli Campaign of the First World War. Unfortunately, a good deal of argument between the Army and Royal Navy had not settled whose budget should fund landing craft construction. Both Army and Navy finally agreed to form a landing craft committee comprising "representatives of all the authorities interested and that they should make recommendations on the design of landing craft." After pooling the desired attributes the committee wished to see in a landing craft, the Director of Naval Construction was requested to draw up a design. However, because of fiscal stringency no landing craft was built for some years.

A prototype motor landing craft (MLC1) was built and first sailed in 1926, finishing trials in 1927. It weighed 16 tons, with a draught of 6.5 ft (2 m). The MLC was box-like in appearance, having a square bow and stern. It was also extremely noisy. In order to prevent fouling of the propellers in a craft destined to spend time in surf and possibly be beached, a simple waterjet propulsion system was devised by White's designers. A Hotchkiss petrol engine drove a centrifugal pump which produced a jet of water, pushing the craft ahead or astern, and steering it, according to how the jet was directed. Speed was 5-6 knots and its beaching capacity was good. By 1930, three MLC were operated by the Royal Navy.

Early MLCs were powered by single Hotchkiss petrol engines. Later craft were powered by single Gill petrol engines.

== Service history ==
At the outbreak of the Second World War, six MLCs were based in Britain and three more were with British forces in Malta.

=== Norwegian Campaign ===
On 29 April 1940, in the Norwegian Campaign, three MLCs accompanied a Landing Craft Mechanised Mk 1 (LCM) Mark I and four Landing Craft Assault (LCA)s to the Narvik area. Shortly afterwards, two more MLCs arrived. In early May, one of the first tasks accomplished by an MLC was landing French 75mm guns to support Chasseurs in the Gratangen area.

At Hol, on or about 11 May, one MLC sank due to a loading accident when a 13-ton Hotchkiss H39 tank drove off a jetty directly into the cargo well. Both went to the bottom.

The first use of British landing craft in the Second World War, in an opposed landing, saw the disembarkation of French Foreign Legionnaires of the 13th Demi-Brigade (13e DBLE) and supporting French Hotchkiss H39 tanks on the beach at Bjerkvik, eight miles (13 km) above Narvik, on 13 May during the Norwegian campaign. The army commander, Général de brigade Antoine Béthouart, responsible for capturing the area north of Rombaksfjorden, realized that a landing behind German lines, in Herjangsfjorden, a part of Ofotfjorden north of Narvik was required to force the enemy to retire. The plan agreed involved a pre-landing naval bombardment, followed by the landing of three tanks - two from MLCs, and one from the new LCM(1), then the landing of an initial wave of infantry from LCAs, and lastly a follow-on force carried in barges and towed by motor torpedo boats. On 12 May, at about 23:40, Royal Navy destroyers commenced a bombardment of the town intending to destroy all buildings on the foreshore. The plan became somewhat frustrated by the slow deployment of the MLCs (and their tank cargoes), from the davits of the battleship Resolution, then serving as their transport ship. The LCAs landed after the LCM(1) had delivered a tank to the beach. The LCA crews manoeuvred their craft in the small hamlet to the west of the village of Bjerkvik, the intended landing place, and under a slight rise in the ground in order to spare the soldiers casualties from opposing machine gun fire. Although touchdown was in the early hours of the new day the midnight sun illuminated the battle-field. Once ashore, the 13e DBLE's companies deployed to seize the high ground to the north and south of the town.

The MLCs, along with towed ship's boats and other landing craft types, then turned to landing the rest of 13e DBLE and its supporting elements.

The small flotilla of MLCs, LCAs and an LCM(1) had added greatly to the Allies' tactical latitude.

All the MLCs used at Narvik were lost in operations, fell victim to the sea and weather, or were destroyed and abandoned before the Allied withdrawal.

=== Dunkirk ===
Two motor landing craft participated in Operation Dynamo, evacuating soldiers of the British Expeditionary Force off the beaches to the east of Dunkirk harbour. The MLCs worked alongside an LCM(1) and a number of LCAs. MLC12 was abandoned at Dunkirk on 2 June 1940, and a day later MLC17 met the same fate.

== See also ==
- Inter-Service Training and Development Centre
- Landing craft assault
- Landing craft mechanized
- Landing ship, infantry
- LCM (1)

== Notes ==
Notes

Citations
