= HMS Glengyle =

Infantry landing ship of the Royal Navy

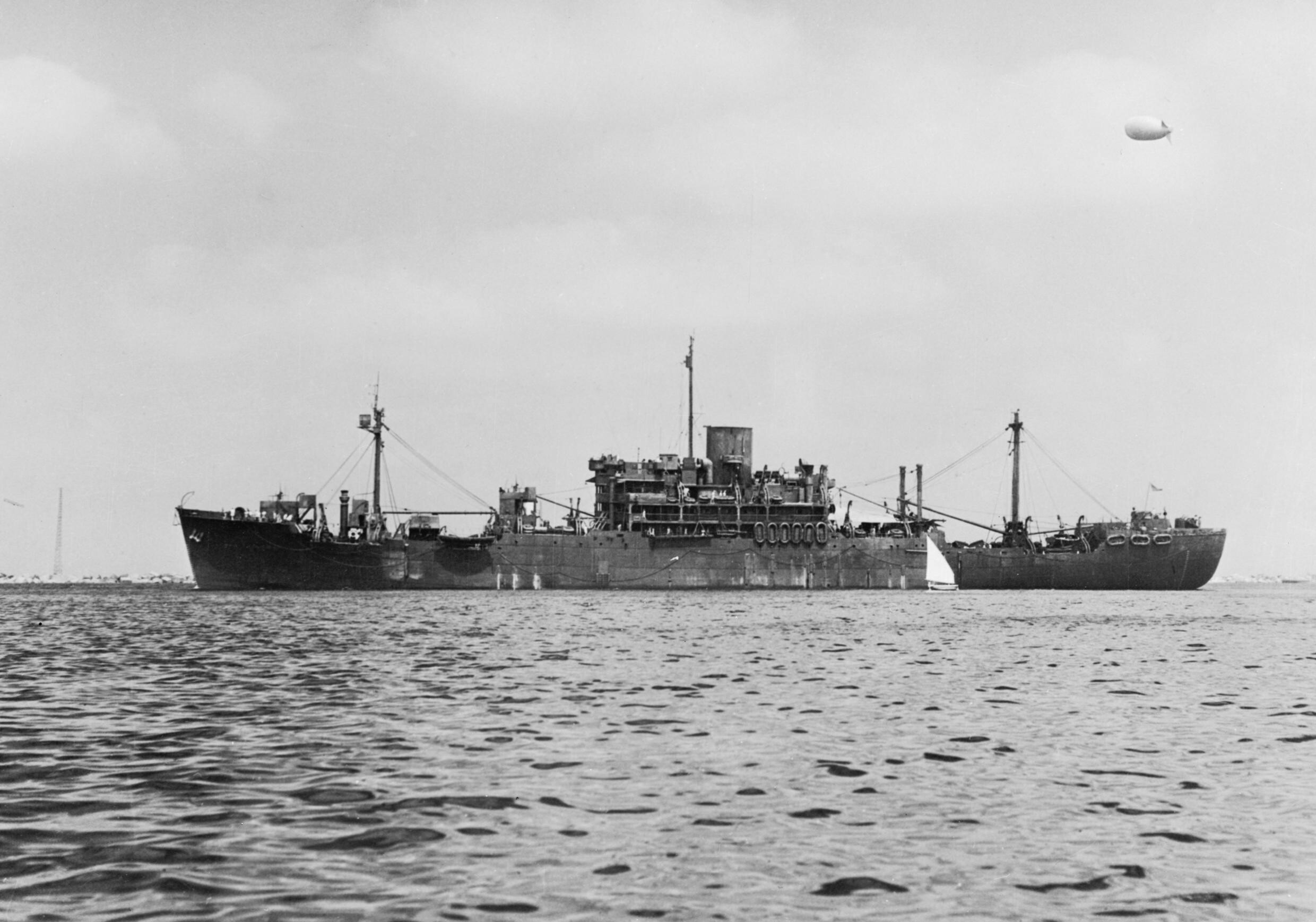

History

United Kingdom
- Name: HMS Glengyle
- Builder: Caledon Shipbuilding & Engineering Company, Dundee
- Yard number: 372
- Launched: 18 July 1939
- Commissioned: 10 January 1940
- Out of service: Returned to Glen Line 17 July 1946
- Renamed: Deucalion in October 1970
- Fate: Scrapped by June 1971

General characteristics
- Class & type: Landing ship, infantry (large)
- Tonnage: 9,919 GRT
- Length: 507 ft 6 in (154.69 m)
- Beam: 66 ft 4 in (20.22 m)
- Draught: 30 ft 6 in (9.30 m)
- Installed power: 12,000 bhp
- Propulsion: Diesel engines; 2 shafts
- Speed: 18 kn (33 km/h; 21 mph)
- Capacity: 34 officers 663 other ranks
- Complement: 523
- Armament: 3 × twin QF 4 inch Mark XVI gun; 2 × quad QF 2 pounder naval gun (pom-pom); 12 × 20mm Mark I IA

HMS Glengyle was a 9,919 GRT cargo ship that served in the Second World War as an infantry landing ship (large) of the Royal Navy. She carried Commonwealth and other Allied troops in amphibious operations. Glengyle was able to make good speed on long ocean voyages to operational areas and then with its landing craft, transport assault infantry, vehicles and stores to defended shores.

== Design and conversion ==
Glengyle was built by Caledon Shipbuilding & Engineering Company, Dundee, for the Glen Line. In 1938, whilst Glengyle and her sisters, Glenearn, Glenroy, and Breconshire were being built, the Inter-Service Training and Development Centre determined that they would be ideal for infantry landing ships. This class of four fast passenger and cargo liners then under construction were intended for the Far East trade route. The Admiralty acquired Glengyle shortly after her launch and she was converted into a fast supply ship. During April and June 1940, she underwent further conversion into an infantry landing ship capable of transporting a force of up to 34 officers and 663 other ranks and carrying 12 Landing Craft Assault (LCA) on Welin-McLachan davits and 1 LCM stored in chocks on deck and launched by 30 long tons (30 t) derricks. She was accepted into service on 10 September and on 31 January 1941, Glengyle sailed around Africa to the Mediterranean, where she became part of Layforce.

== Service history ==
Glengyle was part of the Bardia raid on 19/20 April 1941, and later that month was involved in the evacuation of Greece. She evacuated some 4,500 troops from Porto Rafti and in May carried another 3,000 to Crete. Later in May, she and the Cameronia evacuated 6,000 Argyll and Sutherland Highlanders as part of the evacuation of Crete. On 8 June, Glengyle was operating with the cruisers HMS Phoebe, HMAS Perth and HMS Calcutta at the start of the Syria–Lebanon campaign. By January 1942, she was part of the Malta Convoys, carrying supplies from Alexandria, before returning to Britain in April for preparations for the Dieppe Raid. To keep secret the presence of an infantry landing ship, Glengyle was disguised as a tanker and on 19 August transported The Essex Scottish Regiment to White Beach.

She returned to the Mediterranean in November, where she was used to transport US troops for the Operation Torch landings and was also involved in the Allied invasion of Sicily in 1943, during which Admiral Philip Vian briefly commanded a squadron aboard her. After transporting troops to Salerno in September, Glengyle sailed to Bombay but was then recalled to participate in Operation Shingle, the landings at Anzio. After this she was refitted at Liverpool, where her LCA capacity was increased to 24 by the fitting of luffing davits and inboard cradles for the additional craft. Room was found to berth an additional LCM on deck and a new 50 long tons (51 t) derrick was installed. Glengyle's next voyage following refit was transporting the 5th Airborne Brigade to Bombay. She was at Trincomalee in August, and in company with Llanstephan Castle (Union-Castle Line), she transported 3 Commando Brigade to Hong Kong, arriving shortly after the end of the war.

== Post-war ==
Glengyle was transferred to the Australian Naval Board in October, landing a garrison at Singapore, as well as repatriating Australian troops from South-East Asia. She transported a garrison to Kure in January 1946, before returning home with liberated British prisoners of war from Manila. Glengyle was returned to the Glen Line on 17 July, and after being refitted for a return to merchant service at Vickers-Armstrongs, re-entered service on 3 March 1948. She was transferred to Blue Funnel Line in October 1970 and was renamed Deucalion, but by June 1971 she had been broken up at Kaohsiung.
