= LCM 1 =

Landing craft used in WWII

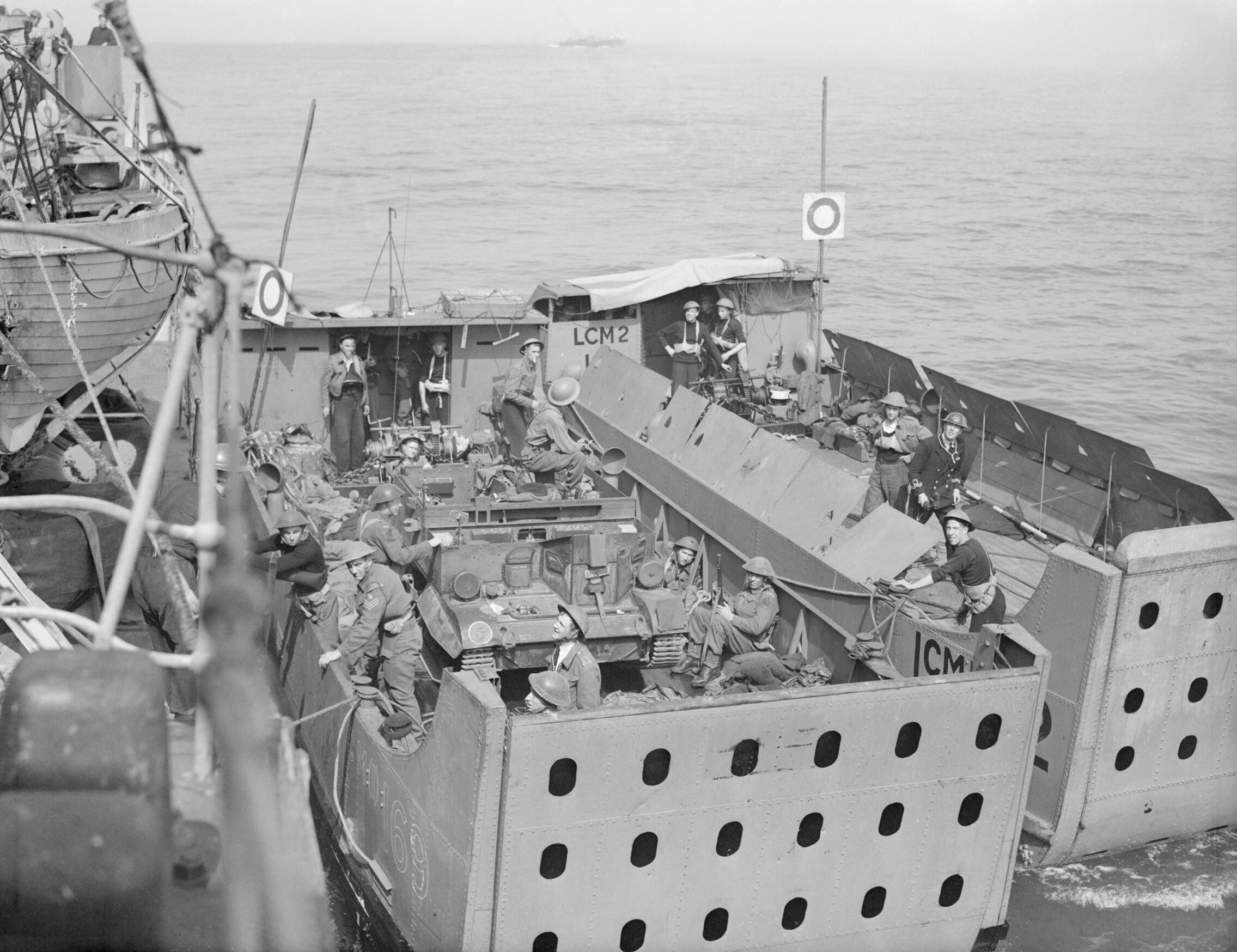
- Two examples of the LCM(1) during the 1942 Dieppe Raid. On the right is an earlier model without the later fully armoured steering shelter. This craft also has been given additional armour around the tank well and a ramp extension.

Class overview
- Name: Landing Craft Mechanised Mark 1
- Builders: John I. Thornycroft Ltd. and others
- Operators: Royal Navy; Royal Canadian Navy; Royal Indian Navy; Royal Netherlands Navy
- Preceded by: Motor Landing Craft
- Succeeded by: LCM (3), LCM (4), LCM (7)
- Built: 1938–1944
- Completed: ~500
- Active: 0
- Lost: 1939–1945: 132; 2 in 1940; 11 in 1941; 39 in 1942; 7 in 1943; 66 in 1944; 7 in 1945

General characteristics
- Type: Landing craft
- Displacement: 21 long tons (21,337 kg)
- Length: 48.5 ft (14.8 m)
- Beam: 14 ft (4.3 m)
- Draught: loaded: 2 ft 6 in fwd, 3 ft 6 in aft; light: 1 ft 4 in fwd, 2 ft 9 in aft
- Ramps: 1
- Propulsion: 2 × 60 bhp Thornycroft petrol engines (later Chrysler)
- Speed: 10 kt (light), 6 kt (loaded)
- Range: 50–80 miles
- Capacity: 1x 16 ton tank, or 100 troops, or 17.5 long tons (17,781 kg) cargo
- Crew: Six: coxswain, stoker, and four seamen, plus one officer per group of three boats
- Armament: 2 × Lewis Guns
- Armour: 10 lb. DIHT (3/4") on bulkheads and sides; 7.8 lb. DIHT (1/4").
- Notes: British Vessels Lost at Sea, 1939–45 HMSO, 1947.; US Navy ONI 226 Allied Landing Craft and Ships, US Government Printing Office, 1944.

The Landing Craft, Mechanised Mark 1 or LCM (1) was a landing craft used extensively in the Second World War. Its primary purpose was to ferry tanks from transport ships to attack enemy-held shores. Ferrying troops, other vehicles, and supplies were secondary tasks. The craft derived from a prototype designed by John I. Thornycroft Ltd. of Woolston, Hampshire, UK. During the war it was manufactured in the United Kingdom in boatyards and steel works. Constructed of steel and selectively clad with armour plate, this shallow-draft, barge-like boat with a crew of 6, could ferry a tank of 16 long tons to shore at 7 knots (13 km/h). Depending on the weight of the tank to be transported the craft might be lowered into the water by its davits already loaded or could have the tank placed in it after being lowered into the water.

Narvik and Dunkirk claimed almost all of the 1920s Motor Landing Craft and, therefore, the LCM(1) was the common British and Commonwealth vehicle and stores landing craft until US manufactured types became available. Early in the war LCM(1) were referred to commonly as Landing Barges by both the military and the press. Prior to July 1942, these craft were officially referred to as "Mechanised Landing Craft" (MLC), but "Landing Craft; Mechanised" (LCM) was used thereafter to conform with the joint US-UK nomenclature system. This being the earliest design in use at the time, it was more specifically called "Landing Craft, Mechanised Mark 1" or LCM(1).

== Design ==
All landing craft designs (and landing ship designs for ships intended to beach) must find a compromise between two divergent priorities; the qualities that make a good sea boat are opposite those that make a craft suitable for beaching.

In 1938, following the Inter-Service Training and Development Centre's (ISTDC) successful development of the infantry carrying LCA and close support LCS, attention turned to the means of efficiently delivering a tank to a beach. Inquires were made of the army as to the heaviest tank that might be employed in a landing operation. The army wanted to be able to land a 12-ton tank, but the ISTDC, anticipating weight increases in future tank models, specified 16 tons burthen for Mechanised Landing Craft designs. The Mercantile Marine Department of the Board of Trade informed the ISTDC that for the new craft to be carried aboard the ordinary heavy-derrick merchant ship, it would need to be limited to 20 tons, no more than 40 feet in length, and 14 feet in beam. Another governor on any design was the need to land tanks and other vehicles in less than approximately 2 ½ feet of water. Design work began at Thornycroft in May 1938, with trials completing in February 1940.

Although early LCM(1)s were powered by two Thornycroft 60 bhp petrol engines, the majority were powered by Chrysler in-line 6-cylinder Crown petrol engines, each developing 60 bhp at 3,200rpm (later units increased to 115 bhp at the same rpm). Piston displacement on the 60 bhp units was 250.6 cubic inches. Two sets of vents, port and starboard, provided air to the engine space. One set was immediately to the fore of the wheel house, and the second set approximately one-third of the craft's overall length from the stern.

=== LCM(4) ===
In the years 1943 and 1944, seventy-seven LCM(4)s were built. Outwardly, the LCM(4) was almost completely identical to a late model LCM(1) – the difference lay inside the pontoon. Here special bilge pumps and special ballast tanks allowed the LCM(4) to alter trim to increase stability when partially loaded.

== Service history ==
Throughout the Second World War, LCM(1)s were used for landing Allied forces in many Commando operations, major and minor, in the European theatre. They also saw service in North Africa and the Indian Ocean. Major references do not record any service in the Pacific. The Royal, Royal Canadian and Royal Indian Navies operated the craft, but soldiers of many Commonwealth and Allied nations were transported into battle aboard them. United States Army formations were dependent on these craft in the North African, Sicilian, and Italian mainland landing operations. Below are operations involving LCM(1)s, and descriptions of how the attributes of the craft, good or ill, suited operational circumstances.

=== 1940 ===
==== The Norwegian campaign ====
The first LCM used in an opposed landing disembarked a French light tank, a 13-ton Hotchkiss H39 supporting the 13th Demi-Brigade (13e DBLE) on the beach at Bjerkvik, 8 miles (13 km) above Narvik, on 13 May during the Norwegian Campaign. The army commander, General Antoine Béthouart, responsible for capturing the area north of Rombaks, realized that a landing behind German lines in the Herjangsfjord was required to force the enemy to retire. The plan agreed involved LCAs making the twenty-mile (32 km) approach journey under their own power, a pre-landing bombardment by ships, followed by the landing of three tanks – one from the LCM 1, and two from the older Motor Landing Craft (MLC), then the landing of an initial wave of infantry from LCAs, and then a follow on force carried in barges towed by motor torpedo boats. On 12 May, at about 23:40, Royal Navy destroyers commenced a bombardment of the town intended to destroy all buildings on the foreshore. The LCAs landed soon after 01:00, when the LCM had delivered its tank to the beach (the other tanks in MLCs were delayed). Though touchdown was in the early hours of the new day the midnight sun illuminated the battle. Once ashore, the 13e DBLE's companies deployed and was seen, from a distance, by Admiral L. E. H. Maund, who had done much work in the LCM's development:

They disappeared and later could be seen crossing behind the village on to the Gratangen road to follow the first tank on its way to the north and so take from the rear that was holding up the advance of the Chasseurs from Gratangen.

The LCM, along with towed ship's boats and other landing craft types, then turned to landing the rest of 13e DBLE and its supporting elements.

The small flotilla of the LCM, MLCs, and LCAs had added greatly to the Allies' tactical latitude. The LCM was lost to enemy action during the succeeding operations in Norway. It was not possible to hoist it onto available ships, so an attempt was made to tow it home behind a trawler, but the sea became too rough and the LCM had to be cut adrift and sunk.

==== Dunkirk ====
One LCM (Note: Maund states two, but this may be a misreading of "British Vessels Lost at Sea, 1939–45", HMSO,1947, which does not differentiate between Motor Landing Craft and Mechanised Landing Craft. One of each type of MLC was recorded lost at Dunkirk.) was used in the evacuation of the BEF from Dunkirk (Operation Dynamo). It safely came away from the beaches toward the close of the operation, but its army passengers and crew were transferred to a larger vessel in the Channel. The master of that ship chose not to take it under tow, but to sink it. Still, the design had proven itself having successfully taken soldiers directly off the beaches.

=== Post-war ===
After the Second World War the Royal Netherlands Navy acquired 35 LCM(1)s that were built between 1940 and 1944.

== See also ==
- Inter-Service Training and Development Centre
- Landing Vehicle Tracked ("Amphtrack")
- Landing Ship, Tank (LST)
- Landing Craft Mechanized (LCM) – an overview article
- Landing Craft Assault
- LCM (2)
- Landing Craft Personnel (Large)
- Landing ship, infantry, as an example HMS Glengyle
- Ramped cargo lighter, a Canadian designed and built landing craft
