= Loben Maund =

British admiral (1892–1957)

Rear-Admiral Loben Maund CBE
- Born: 26 September 1892; Hemel Hempstead, Hertfordshire
- Died: 18 June 1957 (aged 64); Fittleworth, Sussex
- Military career
- Allegiance: United Kingdom
- Branch: Royal Navy
- Service years: 1905–1946
- Rank: Rear-Admiral
- Commands: HMS Scorpion; HMS Danae; Inter-Service Training and Development Centre; HMS Ark Royal; Director of Combined Operations, Middle East; Director of Combined Operations, India; Rear-Admiral, Landing Ships and Craft
- Conflicts: World War I World War II
- Awards: Commander of the Order of the British Empire (CBE); Mention in Despatches (3)

Rear-Admiral Loben Edward Harold Maund CBE (26 September 1892 – 18 June 1957) was a rear admiral of the British Royal Navy, who served in World War I and World War II. He was the captain of the aircraft carrier Ark Royal when she was sunk in November 1941, but went on to serve in Combined Operations, playing an important role in the development of landing craft.

== Biography ==
Maund was born in Hemel Hempstead, Hertfordshire, the son of Edward Arthur Maund and Eleanora Hawkesworth. Entering the Navy on 15 September 1905, he was trained at the Royal Naval Colleges at Osborne and Dartmouth, and was commissioned as a sub-lieutenant on 30 July 1913.

Maund served throughout the First World War, being promoted to lieutenant on 30 December 1914, serving on the Dover Patrol, in the Grand Fleet and in Atlantic convoys, and seeing action at the battle of Jutland in mid-1916. From 1 March 1918 until January 1919 he served as captain of the destroyer Scorpion.

Maund was promoted to lieutenant-commander on 30 December 1922, and in mid-1923 had Wireless Signal duties in the Director of Training and Staff Duties Division, before being assigned in September as Staff Officer (Operations) to the Commander-in-Chief of the East Indies aboard the cruiser Chatham until January 1925. In 1926 he served aboard the cruiser Caradoc in the Mediterranean, before being appointed Executive Officer of the cruiser Curlew in June 1927.

Promoted to commander on 31 December 1927, Maund served as Naval Assistant Secretary to the Committee of Imperial Defence until October 1930, when he was appointed Executive Officer of the aircraft carrier Furious in September 1931. He returned to shore to attend a Senior Officers' War Course at the Royal Naval College at Greenwich in late 1933, receiving promotion to captain on 30 June 1934 to serve in the Training and Staff Duties Division, and as an Assistant Director of Plans at the Admiralty from June 1935.

From August 1936 Maund spent a year as captain of the cruiser Danae on the China Station. In early 1938 he attended another senior officers' course at Greenwich, before being appointed Commandant of the Inter-Service Training and Development Centre based at Portsmouth, where he was tasked with developing methods and equipment to use in Combined Operations. From April to June 1940 he served as Naval Chief of Staff to the Flag Officer, Narvik, during the Norwegian campaign, receiving a Mention in Despatches on 26 September 1940. He then served in the Operations Division of the Admiralty.

=== Ark Royal and afterward ===
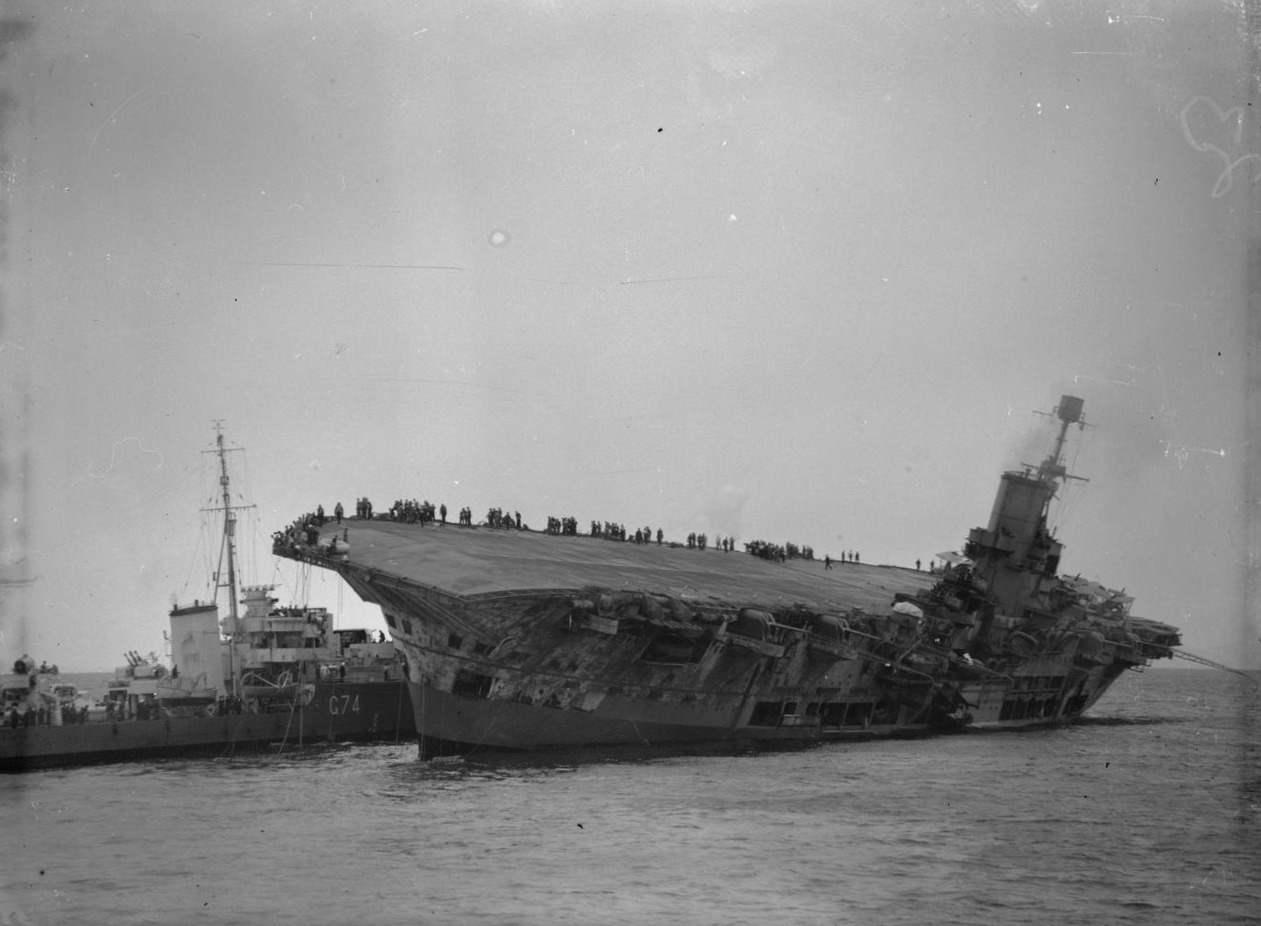
Ark Royal after being torpedoed

On 19 April 1941 Maund succeeded Captain Cedric Holland in command of the aircraft carrier HMS Ark Royal, taking part in the operation to sink the battleship Bismarck, for which he was made a Commander of the Order of the British Empire (CBE) on 14 October 1941; he also sailed with three Malta Convoys, receiving a second Mention in Despatches on 6 January 1942 for his part in Operation Halberd. On 13 November 1941 Ark Royal was hit by a torpedo from U-81; she eventually broke in two and sank the next morning. Following the sinking, a Board of Inquiry was established to investigate the loss. Based on its findings, Maund was court-martialled for negligence in February 1942. He was found guilty on two counts of negligence: one of failing to ensure that properly constituted damage control parties had remained on board after the general evacuation, and one of failing to ensure the ship was in a sufficient state of readiness to deal with possible damage. The board tempered their judgement with an acknowledgement that a high standard was being expected of Maund, and that he was primarily concerned with the welfare of his crew.

On 17 May 1942 Maund was appointed Director of Combined Operations, Middle East, based at Alexandria, with the rank of acting rear admiral, receiving a third Mention in Despatches on 21 December 1943 for his part in Operation Husky - the Allied invasion of Sicily - in July 1943. Maund was officially placed on the Retired List on 8 July 1943; but on 25 August 1943, he was appointed Director of Combined Operations, India, based in Bombay: he arrived there on 16 October. Maund returned to the UK and from 1 October 1944 until July 1945 served as Rear-Admiral, Landing Ships and Craft. He was promoted to rear admiral on 1 March 1946.

== Post-naval career ==
Maund became a director of the scientific instrument makers A. Kershaw & Sons, Ltd. of Leeds, and wrote a book Assault from the Sea, published in 1949 by Methuen & Co., London, which was his account of the development of the Royal Navy's landing craft and their use operationally between 1939 and 1945. Rear-Admiral Maund died at Fittleworth, Sussex, on 18 June 1957.

== Personal life ==
Maund married Edith Mary Collins; they had two sons, Lieutenant Michael Richard Maund DSC, FAA, (1915–1943) and Loben Spencer, who died aged three years, one daughter Rosalind Mary born 1919. In 1933 he married Constance Alice Macartney Iredell.

Loben Maund's brother Pilot Officer Geoffrey Richard Maund died of malaria in Indonesia, in 1942, while a prisoner of the Japanese. Another brother was Air Vice Marshal Arthur Clinton Maund, who also died in 1942 and has an RAF memorial headstone in Brookwood Military Cemetery, Woking.
