= Inter-Service Training and Development Centre =

The Inter-Service Training and Development Centre (ISTDC) was a department under the British Chiefs of Staff set up prior to World War II for the purpose of developing methods and equipment to use in Combined Operations.

Combined Operations badge. The ISTDC came under the command of Combined Operations Headquarters in June 1940.

The ISTDC came into being in May 1938 bringing together representatives from the Royal Navy, Army, and Royal Air Force convened with the portfolio of developing methods and equipment to use in Combined Operations.

== Origins ==
The history of amphibious operations in the British Isles reaches back at least as far as Julius Caesar's legions crossing the Channel to invade from Gaul. For centuries the Royal Navy had been landing soldiers on hostile shores, prominent examples being Quebec 1759, Peking 1900, Zeebrugge 1918, and Gallipoli 1915–16. During the inter-war period, however, a combination of recent experience and economic stringency contributed to the delay in procuring equipment and adopting a universal doctrine for amphibious operations.

The costly failure of the Gallipoli campaign during the First World War coupled with the emerging potential of airpower satisfied many in naval and military circles that the age of amphibious operations had come to a close. Still, throughout the 1920s and 1930s, animated discussion in Staff Colleges in Britain and the Indian Army Staff College at Quetta surrounded the strategic potential of the Dardanelles campaign compared with the strategic stalemate of the Western Front. The economic austerity of the worldwide economic depression and the government's adoption of the Ten Year Rule assured that such theoretical talk would not result in the procurement of any equipment.

The Royal Naval Staff College at Greenwich, drafted a document detailing combined operations requirements and submitted it to the Chiefs of Staff on 22 February 1936. Its principal author was the Director of the Staff College, Captain Bertram Watson, RN. The document synthesized the results of all the inter-Staff College studies of preceding years and made specific recommendations that two new organizations should be set up: a Permanent Committee, drawn from all three Service Ministries; and a Training and Development Centre, also to be inter-service. The Centre should have a permanent force attached to it, preferably of Royal Marines, and its functions were to be as follows:

- (i) To train in all methods for the seizure of defended beaches;
- (ii) To develop the materiel necessary for such methods, with special regard to protection of troops, speed of landing, and the attainment of surprise;
- (iii) To develop methods and materiel for the destruction or neutralization of enemy defenses, including bombardment and aircraft co-operation;
- (iv) In time of war, the whole force to be employed for carrying out minor operations by itself; or in conjunction with military forces, as the covering force to seize and hold beaches for the main landing.

Another paper from Sir Ronald Adam, Deputy Chief of the General Staff, followed covering similar concerns. In May 1938 the Chiefs of Staff established the Inter-Services Training and Development Centre at Fort Cumberland, near Portsmouth. The Royal Marine contingent was not authorized; but there were four officers representing the three services (and one serving as adjutant), a small clerical staff, direct access to the Deputy Chiefs of Staff, and £30,000 (£10,000 from each of the services).

The original officers appointed to the ISTDC were:

- Captain Loben Edward Harold Maund, RN, Commandant of the ISTDC from 1 July 1938 to September 1939
- Major MWM MacLeod, Royal Artillery
- Wing Commander Guy Knocker, Royal Air Force
- Captain Peter-Picton-Phillips, Royal Marines, serving as Adjutant.

== Service history ==
The ISTDC existed only briefly, from May 1938 to mid-1942 (being briefly disbanded between September and December 1939). The Centre had direct access to the Deputy Chiefs of Staff, and the Joint Intelligence Committee. It was also given authority to seek advice more broadly, contacting service departments such as the Director of Naval Construction with regard to hulls and the School of Musketry at Hythe regarding small arms ballistics. Also, ISTDC engaged private industry such as Fleming about small nesting boats and the Porton Gas School to design a floating smoke bomb.

The Centre was instructed to examine certain specific problems:

- troop landings by air
- air supply of stores and equipment
- craft for landing tanks
- beach organisation
- floating piers
- headquarters ships
- amphibian tanks
- underwater obstacles
- the landing of water and petrol
- the use of small craft in amphibious raids

By the end of 1939 the ISTDC had codified a policy for landings, and defended it at Staff College discussions. Operational experience would suggest modifications to this landing policy, but it would be essentially the policy used in the Torch and Husky landings four years later. The essential shape of this landing policy is described by Bernard Fergusson in The Watery Maze,

The system provided for an approach under cover of darkness in fast ships carrying special craft; the craft being sent ashore while the ships lay out of sight of land; small-craft smoke and gun protection while the beachhead was seized; the landing of a reserve; the capture of a covering position far enough inland to secure the beach and anchorage from enemy fire; the bringing in of ships carrying the main body; and finally the discharge of vehicles and stores by other craft specially designed to do so directly on to beaches. And in all this it was important to achieve tactical surprise.

The ISTDC staff went everywhere seeking material and devices and running experiments to discover how sea assaults could proceed. For ships with sufficient speed to become Landing Ships Infantry, the best available was a class of four fast passenger-carrying cargo ships (referred to as "cargo-liners") then under construction for Alfred Holt's Glen Line Far Eastern trade: the Glengyle, Glenearn, Glenroy, and Breconshire. This class could make eighteen knots, be equipped with suitable davits for hoisting out landing craft, and each be adapted to carry a complete battalion, plus some vehicles. They were duly earmarked for commandeering in the event of war.

In March 1942 Louis Mountbatten was promoted to vice-admiral and was appointed to the new position of Chief of Combined Operations (CCO). Soon after, the decision was made to dismember the ISTDC. One part now came under COHQ's newly appointed Director of Experiments and Developments (later Director of Experiments and Operational Requirements, or DXOR). The other part became the Combined Operations Development Centre which in August 1942 was absorbed into the newly established Combined Ops Experimental Establishment (COXE) in North Devon.

== Accomplishments and innovations ==
- Assault Landing Craft
- Mechanized Landing Craft LCM(1)
- Landing Craft Tank (Mk. 1); substantial assistance to the designer
- Manual on Combined Operations
- Infra-red directional beacons for landing accuracy
- Landing Craft crew training base at Northney on Hayling Island
- Support Landing Craft LCS(1), LCS(2)
- Standard Naval Bombardment Code
- Land/Sea Smoke Generating devices
- Floating Piers (pontoons) to bridge the water gap
- Landing Ship Infantry, as an example HMS Glengyle
