= Layforce =

British Army unit

- Active: 1941
- Country: (United Kingdom)
- Allegiance: United Kingdom
- Branch: British Army
- Type: Ad hoc (Commando)
- Role: Amphibious warfare Artillery observer Close-quarters combat Coastal raiding Desert warfare Direct action Irregular warfare Long-range penetration Mountain warfare Patrolling; Raiding; Reconnaissance; Special reconnaissance Urban warfare
- Size: 2,000 men organised into four "Special Service" Battalions
- Part of: British 6th Division
- Engagements: Second World War: Bardia raid; Battle of Crete; Syria-Lebanon Campaign; Siege of Tobruk; Twin Pimples raid

Commanders
- Notable commanders: Robert Laycock

Layforce was an ad hoc military formation of the British Army consisting of a number of commando units during the Second World War. Formed in February 1941 under the command of Colonel Robert Laycock, after whom the force was named, it consisted of approximately 2,000 men and served in the Middle Eastern theatre of operations. Initially tasked with conducting raiding operations to disrupt Axis lines of communication in the Mediterranean it was planned that they would take part in operations to capture the Greek island of Rhodes.

As the strategic situation in the theatre turned against the Allies, however, the commandos were largely diverted from their original role and were used primarily to reinforce regular troops throughout the Mediterranean theatre. Elements of the force saw action in Bardia, Crete, Syria and Tobruk before they were disbanded in August 1941. Afterwards its personnel either returned to their former units or went on to serve with other special forces units raised in the Middle East.

== Background ==
In February 1941, a force of commandos under Colonel Robert Laycock were sent to the Middle East to carry out raids in the eastern Mediterranean. This force became known as 'Layforce' after their commander and initially they were drawn from 'A' Troop from No. 3 Commando, No. 7 Commando, No. 8 (Guards) Commando and No. 11 (Scottish) Commando, with additional personnel being drawn from No. 50 Commando and No. 52 Commando upon their arrival in Egypt in March.

Laycock held the rank of a colonel (rather than brigadier) on the staff, because his command was not formally and organisationally a full brigade, with all its supporting elements; although, with a strength of over 2,000 men, it was equivalent. (Note: On disembarkation the reported All Rank strength of the Battalions was as follows: 'A' Battalion (Colvin): 36 officers and 541 other ranks; 'B' Battalion (Daly): 38 officers and 502 other ranks, 'C' Battalion (Pedder): 35 officers and 498 other ranks; and 'D' Battalion (Young): 36 officers and 532 other ranks. The Folbot Section (Courtney) had 12 folbots, one officer and 18 other ranks.) For reasons of security, the commandos were organised into four battalions and were renamed: No. 7 Commando became 'A' Battalion, No. 8 (Guards) became 'B' Battalion, No. 11 (Scottish) became 'C' Battalion, and No. 50 and No. 52 were amalgamated to form 'D' Battalion. Together they were to operate as a brigade of the British 6th Division, part of Middle East Command. Each battalion was placed under the command of a lieutenant colonel and consisted of: a headquarters; a signals section; a specialist equipment section equipped with a form of collapsible canoe known as a 'folbot'; and two commando companies with five troops, each troop consisting of 50 men.

== Prelude ==
Although upon Layforce's formation the commando concept was embryonic, when it embarked from the United Kingdom it had been intended that the force would be employed to carry out a campaign of harassment and dislocation against enemy forces in the Mediterranean. At the time that Layforce was raised, the British were largely in the ascendency in the theatre, having defeated the Italians; and it was felt that the commandos could be employed in the capture of the Greek island of Rhodes as part of Operation Cordite. The arrival of the Afrika Korps in Cyrenaica and the invasions of Yugoslavia and Greece greatly changed the strategic outlook and by the time that Layforce arrived in Egypt in March, the situation had deteriorated. There was still a role for commando-style operations; and, arguably, a series of successful small-scale raids at vital points in the German rear areas might have forced Rommel to divert some of his offensive capability to defend his lines of communications. Circumstances undermined the Layforce concept almost as soon as it became established.

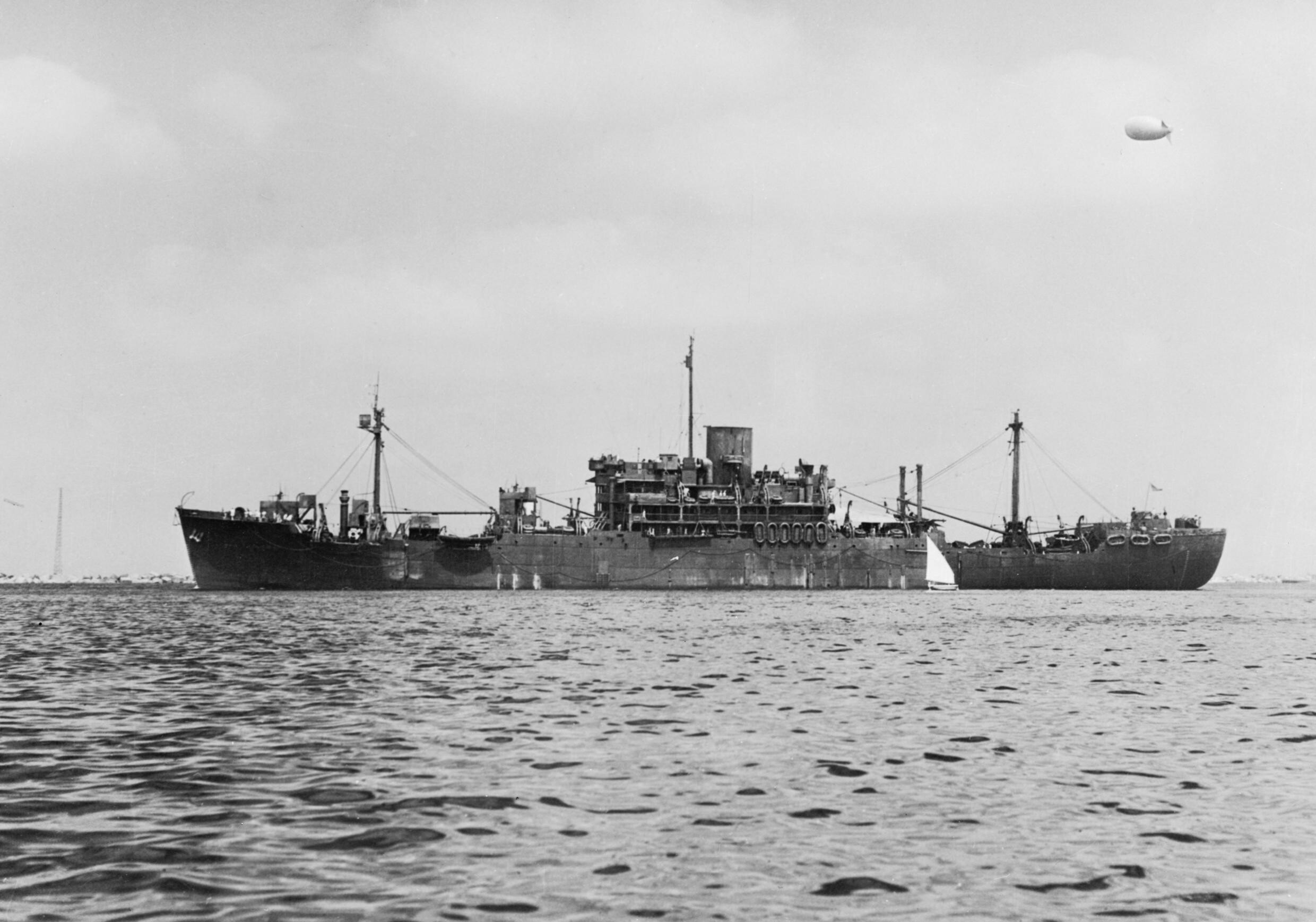
HMS Glengyle

Following the invasions of the Balkans, a large part of the British forces in North Africa were deployed to Greece in an attempt to turn back the German advance. Layforce was not sent, although the three infantry assault ships brought with them from the United Kingdom and which were invaluable in carrying out amphibious operations were taken from them due to a lack of resources in the theatre. This robbed the commandos of one of their most important capabilities; and, although later the Glengyle was released to Laycock's force, the other two ships were not, which severely constrained the forces that he could deploy. The British loss of air superiority severely hampered their ability to carry out landing operations, while the deployment of forces to Greece meant that the commandos became the only troops in general reserve; and as the strategic situation worsened it became increasingly difficult to employ them in the manner for which it had been intended, as they were called upon to reinforce the rest of the army elsewhere.

== Operations ==
=== Bardia ===
In early April Laycock received orders to begin carrying out raids on the Afrika Korps' lines of communication along the North African coast. On 12 April they carried out a preliminary move to Alexandria, and three days later they received orders to carry out the Bardia raid and another on Bomba. 'A' and 'C' Battalions were dispatched to attack Bardia, while four Troops from 'B' Battalion embarked on a destroyer and headed for Bomba. The attacks had to be abandoned, however, due to high seas which would have made disembarking and re-embarking too dangerous.

A few days later it was decided to implement the attack on Bardia. This time, the raiders were drawn from 'A' Battalion (No. 7 Commando), and embarked upon Glengyle. A number of naval support elements were attached, including three Royal Australian Navy destroyers (Stuart, Voyager, and Waterhen) and the anti-aircraft cruiser HMS Coventry. Due to concerns about the force being attacked from the air, it was decided that the raid would take place under the cover of darkness; and, as a result, additional assets in the form of the submarine HMS Triumph and a detachment from the Folboat Troop (later known as the Special Boat Section) under Roger Courtney were tasked with providing navigational assistance by marking both the anchorage and landing beach.

The raid was carried out on the night of 19/20 April 1941, but things went awry from the beginning. The submarine missed its rendezvous with the landing ship, having been strafed by an Allied aircraft shortly before. Problems with the release gear for the assault craft meant that some of the commando parties were late getting ashore, and another landed at the wrong beach.

The landings went ahead unopposed and the commandos moved to the various objectives that had been identified by intelligence. Little damage was done as a number of the targets proved not to exist or were not where they were thought to be. One party was able to damage a bridge, while another set a tyre dump on fire and blew up the breeches of a number of naval guns. Due to the delays during the landings and the need to depart while it was still dark, time ran out and the commandos were forced to withdraw. On the way back, an officer was shot when he failed to respond correctly when challenged by a sentry; while 67 men, not knowing that there were no assault craft at their beach due to the earlier error, were left behind and later captured.

Despite the lack of tangible success, the appearance of the commandos forced the Germans to divert the main part of an armoured brigade from Sollum in order to defend against further raids. Although there were still some elements of operational art that had to be refined, the raid demonstrated the strategic value that the commandos might have had within the theatre, if strategic imperatives and resource constraints had not served to derail the concept.

=== Crete ===
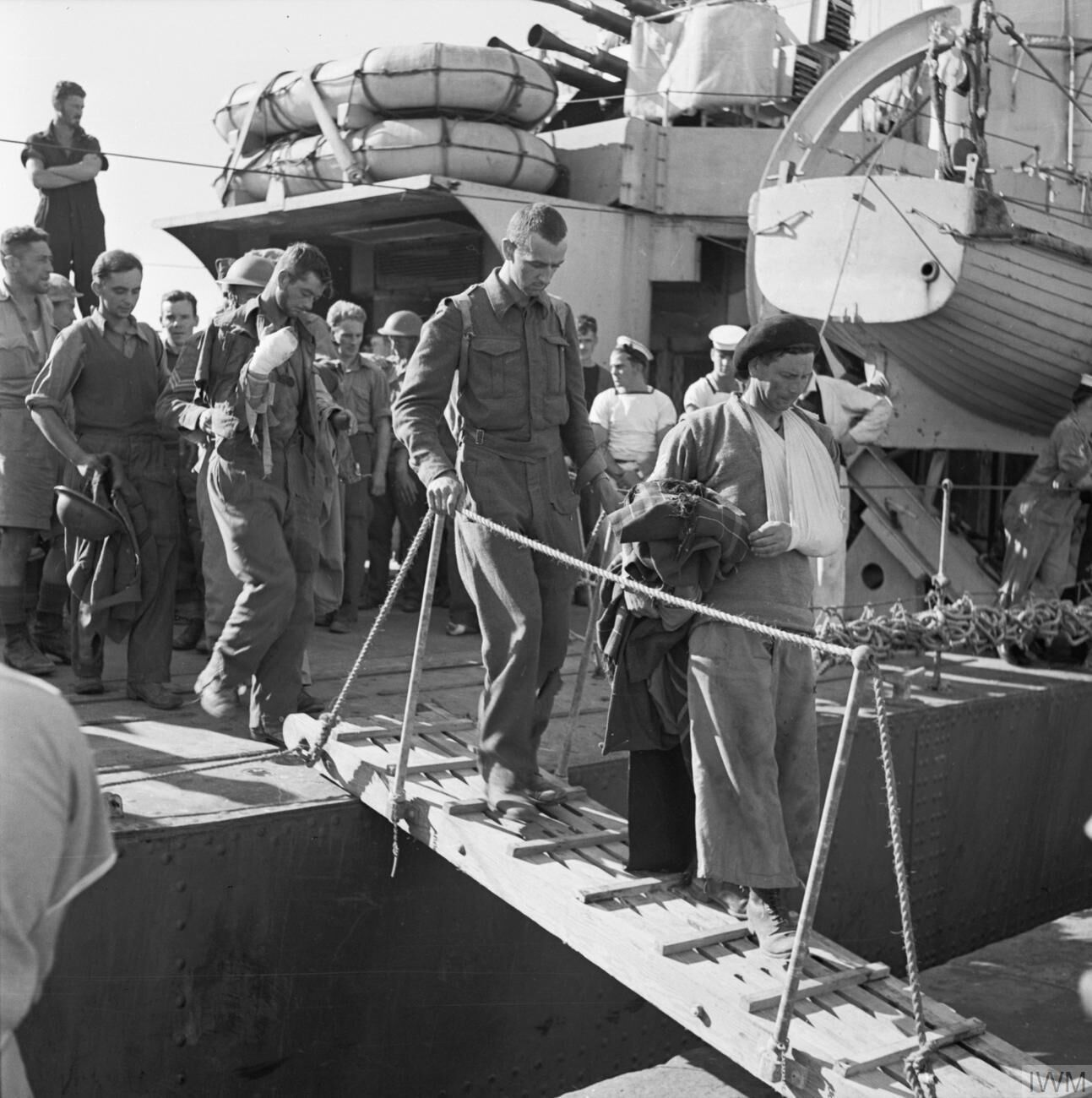
Wounded British troops disembarking in Egypt after being evacuated from Crete

On 6 April 1941 the Germans invaded Greece; less than a month later, on 28 April, the last Allied troops evacuated, having been unable to stop the German advance. On 20 May a German airborne assault on Crete began. The island fell to the Germans on 1 June; however, about a week before that there was still some hope that the tide could be turned. A decision was made to deploy the commandos from Layforce to the island to carry out raids on the German lines of communications with a view to either turning back the invasion or enabling an evacuation to take place.

On 25 May Layforce, consisting mainly of 'A' and 'D' Battalions with a detachment from 'B' Battalion ('C' Battalion (No. 11 (Scottish) Commando) had been sent to reinforce the garrison on Cyprus in case of a German invasion there), departed Alexandria and attempted to land on Crete. They were turned back by bad weather, however, and forced to return to Alexandria where they re-embarked upon the Abdiel to make another attempt. On the night of 26/27 May they landed in Suda Bay. Almost as soon as they landed, it was decided that they could not be employed in an offensive role and would instead be used to cover the withdrawal route towards Sphakia to the south. As such, upon landing they were ordered to leave all their heavy equipment, including radios and transport, behind. This was a role that they were poorly equipped for, though, as they were lacking in the indirect-fire-support weapons such as mortars or artillery and were armed only very lightly, mainly with rifles and a few Bren light machine guns.

Nevertheless, by sunrise on 27 May they had taken up a defensive position along the main road that led inland from Sphakia. From then until 31 May, they were engaged in carrying out a number of rearguard actions to enable the main body of troops to be taken off the beaches by the navy. Throughout the entire time they were almost constantly under aerial attack.

On 28 May the defenders began disengaging from the enemy and withdrawing along the pass through the central mountains that separated them from the port of Sphakia in the south. The defence of the pass fell to the Commandos along with two Australian infantry battalions (the 2/7th and 2/8th Battalions) and the 5th New Zealand Brigade. In the first two nights of the evacuation approximately 8,000 men were taken off, while on the third night, 30 May, covered by the Australians and Laycock's commandos, the New Zealanders were able to get off too.

For the commandos, the fighting was heaviest on that first day. During the height of the German attack on the pass, G Troop from 'A' Battalion (No. 7 Commando), under Lieutenant F. Nicholls, carried out a bayonet assault after a force of Germans took up a position on a hill on the Commando's left flank, from where they began to enfilade the entire position. Twice the Germans came at them and each time the attack was turned back by stubborn defence. Elsewhere that same day, however, Laycock's headquarters was ambushed; and in a rather confused action he and his brigade major, Freddie Graham, commandeered a tank in which they returned to the main body.

By 31 May the evacuation was drawing to a close and the commandos, running low on ammunition, rations and water, fell back towards Sphakia too. Laycock and some of his headquarters, including his intelligence officer Evelyn Waugh, managed to get out on the last ship to depart. The vast majority of the commandos were left behind on the island. Although some of them were later able to make their own way back to Egypt, by the end of the operation about 600 of the 800 commandos sent to Crete were listed as killed, missing, or wounded. Only 23 officers and 156 others managed to get off the island.

=== Syria ===
On 8 June 1941 the Allies launched Operation Exporter, the invasion of Vichy French controlled Syria and Lebanon. As a part of this operation, 'C' Battalion No. 11 (Scottish) Commando were tasked with seizing a crossing over the Litani River on 9 June ahead of the Allied advance. Embarking upon the Glengyle under the command of Lieutenant Colonel Richard R.N. Pedder (Highland Light Infantry), the plan called for the Commandos to land on the north bank of the river, near Kafr Bada, and attempt to seize the bridge that spanned the river there before the defenders could detonate the explosive charges that were believed to have been placed on the structure.

Upon arriving offshore, the raiding party waited until dawn to take to the water in order to conceal their approach as best as possible. The force was broken up into three detachments with Pedder commanding the centre, the second in command, Major Geoffrey Keyes commanding the right detachment and Captain George More commanding the left detachment. Although the landing was unopposed, the southern detachment under Keyes soon discovered that they had been put ashore by mistake on the wrong side of the river. As Pedder's detachment advanced on the target, the French colonial troops from the 22nd Algerian Tirailleurs that were defending the area opened fire and in the ensuing engagement Pedder was killed and a number of other officers in the centre detachment were wounded. Nevertheless, the detachment pressed on and, under the command of the Regimental Sergeant Major, they succeeded in securing one of the barracks buildings near the redoubt that formed the key to defence of the position. At the same time the left detachment under More captured a number of howitzers and field guns, as well as a number of prisoners, but as the initial surprise of the attack wore off, the defenders were able to organise themselves. The fighting became more intense, and as the French brought up mortars and artillery, a stalemate developed.

While this was going on, the right detachment under Keyes, having found itself on the wrong side of the river, made contact with the Australian 2/16th Battalion to the south which brought up a boat with which they could make a crossing. Due to the size of the boat, it had to make a number of trips before the detachment was on the northern side. Once that was complete Keyes was able to take command of the unit. After carrying out a reorganisation, he was able to launch an assault on the redoubt and by 13:00 they had captured it and secured the crossing. This allowed C Company of the 2/16th Battalion to cross in force and Keyes handed control of the redoubt over to its commander at 19:00.

Of the 406 men that landed, 130 were killed or wounded, including the commanding officer, in nearly 29 hours of fighting. Despite being outnumbered, and short on ammunition and food, they held their position long enough for the Australians to cross the river and continue with their advance to Beirut. A short time later, No. 11 Commando returned to garrison duty on Cyprus.

=== Tobruk ===
Following their involvement in the rearguard actions on Crete, a detachment of five officers and 70 other ranks from No. 8 Commando were sent to Tobruk, which was at the time under siege. In June, as the Eighth Army launched Operation Battleaxe in an attempt to relieve the garrison from the east, it was decided that the commandos would carry out a raid on an Italian position that was dominating the forward positions of the Indian 18th Cavalry. The position, which was known as the Twin Pimples, consisted of two small hills that sat close together and from where the Italians were able to observe the Allied lines. For a number of days prior to carrying out the raid, the commandos carried out patrols with the Indians to become familiar with the ground and to practise moving over the terrain at night. Finally on the night of 17/18 July they attacked.

It was a raid that was typical of what the men had been trained for, but which they had rarely been able to conduct since arriving in the Middle East. It proved to be highly successful, being well-planned and executed, with a carefully laid deception plan. Under the cover of darkness the commandos managed to sneak up behind the hills, moving thorough the Italian forward positions unchallenged. In the end they advanced to within 30 yards before they were challenged, and when they finally were, the force rushed the Italian defenders and quickly overwhelmed them. They then withdrew from the position just before the defenders called in an artillery barrage on the position and returned to the garrison holding Tobruk. They suffered five casualties in the raid, one of whom later died of his wounds.

== Disbandment ==
By late July 1941 the operations that Layforce had undertaken had severely reduced its strength and under the circumstances reinforcements were unlikely. The operational difficulties that had been exposed during the Bardia raid, the changing strategic imperatives of the situation in the Middle East, and the failure of the high command to fully embrace the commando concept had largely served to make the force ineffective. As a result, the decision was made to disband Layforce. Many of the men went back to their previous regiments following the decision, while others chose to remain in the Middle East and subsequently joined other special forces units that were raised later.

Laycock travelled to London to discuss with the War Office his concerns about the way in which his force had been treated. Upon hearing about its disbandment later, British prime minister Sir Winston Churchill—a great advocate for the commandos—ordered the formation of the Middle East Commando, made up from the commandos that had remained in the theatre. When Laycock returned from England he found that, although the Middle East Commando had indeed been set up, there were very few men for him to command. What men there were, were formed into six troops. The embryonic Special Air Service, then known as L Detachment, were designated Nos. 1 and 2 Troops, while 60 men from the disbanded No. 11 (Scottish) Commando made up No. 3 Troop. The men of No. 51 Commando formed Nos. 4 and 5 Troops, and the Special Boat Section made up No. 6 Troop, under Roger Courtney. These designations, however, were largely ignored as the men referred to themselves by their old designations.

In November, as part of Operation Crusader, an offensive aimed at relieving the besieged garrison at Tobruk, No. 3 Troop of Middle East Commando was involved in Operation Flipper, an attempt to raid Erwin Rommel's headquarters in Libya and kill the German commander. The raid was part of a larger operation involving Stirling's L Detachment and the SBS to penetrate behind the German lines and cause disruption in the rear areas in order to assist in the general offensive. In the end, however, the raid failed and only two men—one of whom was Laycock himself—managed to return to British lines. The commander, Lt. Col. Geoffrey Keyes, was posthumously awarded the Victoria Cross for his leadership and bravery during the raid.

Although the Middle East Commando remained in existence after this—largely in an effort to placate Churchill—its personnel were mainly absorbed into larger formations. Many of these men joined the Special Air Service, which was expanded by Stirling with Churchill's approval. Laycock was promoted to brigadier and put in charge of the Special Service Brigade, Middle East Command, replacing Brigadier Charles Haydon.

== Notes ==
Footnotes

Citations
