= No. 8 (Guards) Commando =

Commando unit of the British army during World War II

- Active: 1940–1941
- Country: United Kingdom
- Branch: British Army
- Type: Commando
- Role: Raiding
- Size: ~ 500 officers and men
- Part of: Layforce
- Engagements: Second World War: Battle of Crete; Siege of Tobruk; Twin Pimples raid

Commanders
- Notable commanders: Robert Laycock

Insignia
- Combined Operations Shoulder Patch

No. 8 (Guards) Commando was a unit of the British Commandos and part of the British Army during the Second World War. The Commando was formed in June 1940 primarily from members of the Brigade of Guards. It was one of the units selected to be sent to the Middle East as part of Layforce. On arrival they became known as 'B' Battalion in an attempt at deception, not wanting the Axis forces to know there was a commando formation in the theatre of war. The commando participated in the Battle of Crete and around Tobruk before being disbanded in late 1941. After this, many of its personnel went on to serve in other commando units formed in the area, including the Special Air Service.

== History ==
=== Formation ===
Raised in June 1940 by Robert Laycock it was formed mainly from volunteers from London District, and included men from the Household Cavalry, Foot Guards, Somerset Light Infantry, Royal Engineers, Royal Artillery and the Royal Marines. In October 1940, as part of a reorganisation of the Commando formations, the unit was amalgamated with No. 3 Commando into a single special service battalion known as the 4th Special Service Battalion, under Laycock's command. As a part of this organisation, the unit’s name was changed to 'B' Special Service Company. (Note: No. 3 Commando formed 'A' Special Service Company in this organisation. Durnford-Slater 2002, p. ix.)

In January 1941, the special service battalion organisation was disbanded and the commando designation was readopted. As a result, No. 8 (Guards) Commando were split from No. 3 Commando and raised back up to battalion strength.

Initially, training was fairly rudimentary and consisted mainly of "forced marches and heavy pressure"; however, more evolved training in operating with assault landing craft was undertaken later on and No. 8 Commando moved up to the small seaside town of Largs, on the coast in Ayrshire, Scotland where they were billeted by the townspeople and remained for about a month. The next move was to the town of Lamlash, on the island of Arran. Shortly after arriving there, though, Laycock had to disband an entire troop—No. 8 Troop—and most of the men were "returned to unit" as he felt that their training had not been up to standard.

Nevertheless, the unit continued to train and at this time No. 8 Commando formed an experimental section, known as the Folboat Section, under Lieutenant Roger Courtney, who had convinced Laycock of the usefulness of the two-seat collapsible canoes by carrying out a mock raid on the Glengyle. (Note: The Folboat Section was later designated the Special Boat Section, a forerunner to the Special Boat Service that currently exists. Parker 2000, p. 32.)

=== Crete and Tobruk ===
On 31 January 1941, with an establishment of 38 officers and 502 other ranks, they set sail for the Middle East. Along with No. 7, No. 11 (Scottish), No. 50 and No. 52 Commandos they became part of Layforce and were redesignated 'B' Battalion of Laycock's brigade-sized force. They did not take part in the unsuccessful raid on Bardia, but on 27 May 1941, after a previously unsuccessful landing attempt two days earlier, a detachment landed on Crete with 'A' Battalion (No. 7 Commando) and 'D' Battalion (Nos. 50 and 52 Commandos) in an effort to stem the tide of the German attack on the island long enough for the garrison to be evacuated.

Throughout a period of five days from 27–31 May they fought a series of rearguard (following behind the main retreating friendly force in order to prevent an advancing enemy force taking the retreating force from behind) actions around Sphakia, before they too were evacuated. By that time, however, there were few vessels left and as a consequence many of the unit's men were left behind and subsequently captured. Of the 800 men from Layforce that were sent to Crete, only about 200 escaped.

Following the evacuation from Crete, a detachment from No. 8 (Guards) Commando consisting of five officers and 70 other ranks was sent to Tobruk, which was at the time was under siege. In June the Allies launched Operation Battleaxe, an attempt to relieve the garrison. Within this situation it was decided that the commandos in Tobruk could be used to carry out raids against the positions facing them. In the middle of the month the detachment from No. 8 (Guards) Commando began carrying out patrols in an effort to become familiar with the terrain and to practice moving at night. It was then decided that they would carry out the a raid on an Italian position that was dominating the forward areas of the Indian 18th Cavalry. The position, which was known as the Twin Pimples, consisted of two small hills that sat close together and from where the Italians were able to observe the Allied lines.

It was to be a raid that was typical of what the men had been trained for, but which they had rarely been able to conduct since arriving in the Middle East.

On the night of 17/18 July the detachment attacked the Italian position. It proved to be highly successful, being well-planned and executed. Using the cover of darkness and a carefully laid deception plan, the commandos managed to sneak up behind the Italians position on the hills, and move thorough the forward defensive pits unchallenged. In the end they advanced to within 30 yards of the headquarters before they were challenged, and when they finally were, the force rushed the Italian defenders with sub machine guns and grenades and quickly overwhelmed them. They then withdrew from the position just before the Italians could call down an artillery barrage and returned to the garrison holding Tobruk. They suffered five casualties in the raid, one of whom later died of his wounds.

=== Disbandment ===
Soon afterwards the Tobruk raid No. 8 (Guards) Commando was disbanded. Its parent formation, Layforce, suffering from the losses suffered in the early raids and the evacuation from Crete, and stymied by lack of resources, changing strategic needs and a lack of enthusiasm for their employment by parts of the British high command, became ineffective and was itself disbanded in August. Shortly after this, though, upon the insistence of Sir Winston Churchill, the Middle East Commando was raised from the remnants of Layforce and some of No. 8 (Guards) Commando's personnel transferred this unit, while others, including David Stirling, Randolph Churchill, George Jellicoe, David Sutherland and Roger Courtney went on to become part of other special forces units such as the Special Air Service, the Special Boat Section or the Long Range Desert Group.

== Battle honours ==
The following Battle honours were awarded to the British Commandos during the Second World War.

- Adriatic
- Alethangyaw
- Aller
- Anzio
- Argenta Gap
- Burma 1943–45
- Crete
- Dieppe
- Dives Crossing
- Djebel Choucha
- Flushing
- Greece 1944–45
- Italy 1943–45
- Kangaw
- Landing at Porto San Venere
- Landing in Sicily
- Leese
- Litani
- Madagascar
- Middle East 1941, 1942, 1944
- Monte Ornito
- Myebon
- Normandy Landing
- North Africa 1941–43
- North-West Europe 1942, 1944–1945
- Norway 1941
- Pursuit to Messina
- Rhine
- St. Nazaire
- Salerno
- Sedjenane 1
- Sicily 1943
- Steamroller Farm
- Syria 1941
- Termoli
- Vaagso
- Valli di Comacchio
- Westkapelle

== Notes ==
Footnotes

Citations
