= No. 50 Commando =

Commando unit of the British army during World War II

- Active: 1940–1941
- Country: United Kingdom
- Branch: British Army
- Type: Commando
- Role: Amphibious warfare Close-quarters combat Coastal raiding Desert warfare Direct action Forward observer Raiding; Reconnaissance
- Size: Battalion
- Part of: Combined Operations
- Engagements: Second World War

Insignia
- Combined Operations Shoulder Patch

No. 50 Commando was a battalion-sized British Commando unit of the British Army during the Second World War. The commando was formed in 1940, from volunteers in Egypt and Palestine. Shortly after formation it was amalgamated with No. 52 Commando and became 'D' Battalion, Layforce.

== Background ==
The commandos were formed in 1940, by the order of Winston Churchill the British Prime Minister. He called for specially trained troops that would "develop a reign of terror down the enemy coast". At first they were a small force of volunteers who carried out small raids against enemy occupied territory, but by 1943 their role had changed into lightly equipped assault Infantry which specialised in spearheading amphibious landings.

The man initially selected as the overall commander of the force was Admiral Sir Roger Keyes himself a veteran of the landings at Galipoli and the Zeebrugge raid in the First World War. Keyes resigned in October 1941 and was replaced by Admiral Louis Mountbatten.

By the autumn of 1940 more than 2,000 men had volunteered for commando training, and what became known as the Special Service Brigade was formed into 12 units called commandos. Each commando would number around 450 men commanded by a lieutenant colonel. They were sub divided into troops of 75 men and further divided into 15-man sections. Commandos were all volunteers seconded from other British Army regiments and retained their own cap badges and remained on their regimental roll for pay. All volunteers went through the six-week intensive commando course at Achnacarry. The course in the Scottish Highlands concentrated on fitness, speed marches, weapons training, map reading, climbing, small boat operations and demolitions both by day and by night.

By 1943 the commandos had moved away from small raiding operations and had been formed into brigades of assault infantry to spearhead future Allied landing operations. Three units were left un-brigaded to carry out smaller-scale raids.

In December 1940 a Middle East Commando depot was formed with the responsibility of training and supplying reinforcements for the commando units in the Middle East.

== Formation ==
No. 50 Commando was formed in the Middle East at Geneifa in August 1940, from volunteers from units serving in the Middle East and a small number of veterans from the Spanish Civil War who had escaped to Palestine after the French defeat in 1940. Under the command of Lieutenant Colonel George Young, No. 50 Commando had an establishment of a small Headquarters and three Troops. Each Troop had four sections of one officer and 25 other ranks. A total of 371 all ranks.

In February 1941, No. 50 Commando was amalgamated with No. 52 Commando, when a force of commandos under Colonel Robert Laycock was formed to carry out raids in the eastern Mediterranean. This force known as 'Layforce' was drawn from 'A' Troop, No. 3 Commando, No. 7, No. 8 (Guards), No. 11 (Scottish) and the amalgamated No.50/51 Commandos. For reasons of security, the unit was organised into four battalions and were re-designated as such. No. 7 Commando became 'A' Battalion, No. 8 (Guards) became 'B' Battalion, No. 11 (Scottish) became 'C' Battalion and No. 50/52 became 'D' Battalion. As 'D' Battalion they fought in the battle of Crete and were disbanded after the survivors returned to Egypt.

== Battle honours ==
The following Battle honours were awarded to the British Commandos during the Second World War.

- Adriatic
- Alethangyaw
- Aller
- Anzio
- Argenta Gap
- Burma 1943–45
- Crete
- Dieppe
- Dives Crossing
- Djebel Choucha
- Flushing
- Greece 1944–45
- Italy 1943–45
- Kangaw
- Landing at Porto San Venere
- Landing in Sicily
- Leese
- Litani
- Madagascar
- Middle East 1941, 1942, 1944
- Monte Ornito
- Myebon
- Normandy Landing
- North Africa 1941–43
- North-West Europe 1942, 1944–1945
- Norway 1941
- Pursuit to Messina
- Rhine
- St. Nazaire
- Salerno
- Sedjenane 1
- Sicily 1943
- Steamroller Farm
- Syria 1941
- Termoli
- Vaagso
- Valli di Comacchio
- Westkapelle
