= Special Interrogation Group =

British special forces group during WWII

The Special Interrogation Group (SIG), sometimes called the Lions of Judah, (Note: Some sources interpret the acronym "SIG" as "Special Identification Group".) was a unit of the British Army during World War II, formed of German-speaking Jewish volunteers, most of whom were from Mandatory Palestine. Disguised as soldiers of the German Afrika Korps, members of the SIG undertook commando and sabotage operations against Axis forces during the Western Desert Campaign.

== Formation ==
The inspiration for the SIG belonged to Captain Herbert Cecil Buck, MC of the 3rd Bn., 1st Punjab Regiment and later the Scots Guards, an Oxford scholar and German linguist. He had been captured in January 1942, but had soon managed to break free and had then escaped back across Libya to Egypt, partly using German uniforms and vehicles. He was surprised by the ease of his deception and felt that, with greater planning and preparation, the concept could be used more offensively, to assist raiding parties attack key targets behind enemy lines. His plan was approved and, in March 1942, he was appointed the commander of this new unit, the SIG.

In March 1942, Col. Terence Airey, Military Intelligence Research at the War Office in London wrote that "a Special German Group as a sub-unit of M[iddle] E[ast] Commando... with the cover name 'Special Interrogation Group', to be used for infiltration behind the German lines in the Western Desert, under 8th Army... the strength of the Special Group would be approximately that of a platoon... The personnel are fluent German linguists... mainly Palestinian (Jews) of German origin. Many of them have had war experience with No. 51 Commando..."

Some personnel were recruited directly from the Palmach, the elite strike force of the Haganah. Buck visited the Palmach's "German platoon" and directly recruited volunteers from there. German-speaking Palestinian Jews were also recruited from other units, including No. 51 Commando. Some had previously been active in the Special Night Squads. One SIG operative, Karl Kahane, had served in the Austro-Hungarian Army during World War I. Other recruits came from the Free Czechoslovak Forces and the French Foreign Legion. Two German prisoners of war who claimed to be against the Nazi regime, Walter Essner and Herbert Brueckner, were also recruited and assigned to train the operatives. The operatives were uncomfortable with this but Buck dismissed their concerns. Before the war, both had been members of the French Foreign Legion who had been captured in November 1941 serving in the 361st Infantry Regiment of the Afrika Korps and were subsequently recruited by the British Combined Services Detailed Interrogation Centre (CSDIC) as double agents. The SIG was a part of D Squadron, First Special Air Service Regiment. Its strength varied between 20 and 38, according to various sources.

== Training and equipment ==
According to ex-SIG member Maurice "Tiffen" Monju Tiefenbrunner, their first training base was located near Suez. The SIG were trained in desert navigation, unarmed combat, and the handling of German weapons and explosives. The training was conducted entirely in German. The recruits were sometimes suddenly woken in the early morning and expected to reply immediately only in German, with any Hebrew being spoken meriting expulsion. They had no contact with other British units, as it was expected that they live, drill, and speak only as German soldiers. Each morning they were roused out of bed by the command "Kompanie aufstehen!" ("company get up"!) which was followed by twenty minutes of strenuous physical training. They were taught German military songs, terms, procedure, and slang. Buck emphasized to the recruits that they would likely be tortured and executed if captured and that their lives depended on their ability to convincingly play the part of German soldiers. The operatives were given captured German uniforms and weapons, as well as German cigarettes and chocolates. Each member was given a fake German identity complete with forged German army paybooks. They also carried photographs of themselves posing with fake wives and girlfriends who were in fact female ATS workers from army headquarters in Cairo along with fake love letters. The documents were produced on German army typewriters. The group was allocated a captured German staff car and two trucks as their transport.

== Operations ==
By May 1942, the SIG was operational. Dressed as Feldgendarmerie (German military police), they drove captured German vehicles behind German lines near Bardia, set up roadblocks and questioned German transports, gathering important intelligence. On other occasions they would enter German camps and gather intelligence by speaking to soldiers and carry out acts of sabotage behind German lines while wearing German uniforms. In one instance, Tiefenbrunner even lined up to collect pay from a German field cashier. SIG operatives also mingled with German POWs to gather intelligence and observe their behavior.

On 3 June 1942 the SIG was assigned its first assault operation. They were to assist the Special Air Service, led by Lt. Col. David Stirling in destroying Luftwaffe airfields which were threatening the Malta convoys. These airfields were located 100 miles west of Tobruk at Derna and Martuba in the Italian colony of Libya. The attack was to take place on the night of 13/14 June 1942. According to one account, eight SIG operatives participated, while Tiefenbrunner claimed that 12 did. They were joined by fifteen Free French SAS soldiers led by Lieutenant Augustin Jordan. Captain Buck also participated in the mission. The SIG operatives were to pose as German guards escorting Free French prisoners. The attack on the Martuba airfield was a success, with the operatives destroying 20 aircraft and escaping safely, but the raid on Derna airfield failed. On the way to the airfield, Brueckner, who was driving the raiding party's truck, stopped and claimed there was a mechanical problem. He went to a nearby German camp and returned with a group of German soldiers who demanded that everyone exit the truck. Understanding that they had been betrayed, the raiders opened fire and a gunbattle ensued. The raiders fought fiercely and inflicted numerous casualties on the Germans but were overwhelmed. All of raiding party was killed or captured except for Jordan, who was wounded but managed to escape. Some of the other French commandos had managed to temporarily escape but were captured in the desert over the following days. Jordan stated that he had seen two SIG men throwing grenades at the Germans before blowing themselves and the truck up when on the brink of capture. Tiefenbrunner and Aryeh Shai claimed that they learned that two SIG men had been captured and shot.

Later, two Luftwaffe pilots taken prisoner at the First Battle of El Alamein provided additional details of the incident under interrogation. They claimed that the Germans knew that commandos dressed in German uniforms would attempt raids on German airbases in Libya and confirmed that Brueckner had betrayed the group. They also mentioned the capture of one of the SIG men. According to their testimony, the day after the raid a wounded man showed up at a German military hospital claiming to be a German soldier in need of treatment. The doctor became suspicious of him and on examination he was found to be Jew from Palestine.

Essner, who had taken part in the Martuba raid and behaved well, was closely guarded by Tiefenbrunner on the way back to base and subsequently handed over to the military police. He was later shot while trying to escape.

Simultaneous to the raid, another SIG operative, Karl Kahane, took part in a separate sabotage mission aimed at Benghazi together with Stirling, Paddy Mayne, and four other SAS commandos. Kahane talked them through the first German roadblock they encountered. They also passed an Italian roadblock but at a subsequent German checkpoint the Sergeant Major asked them the password. Kahane attempted to bluff his way through but the German was not satisfied and walked up to the truck. Mayne then cocked his revolver and the German ordered them to be let through, apparently having realized that they were British soldiers but that he would be shot in the event of a confrontation. With their cover blown, the team abandoned its original goal of Benghazi and struck nearby targets of opportunity, blowing up a roadblock, fuel tanks, pumps, trucks, and half-tracks before making a narrow escape while being chased by armored cars, exchanging fire with their pursuers before managing to get away.

The news that soldiers of German origin were fighting with the Allies in North Africa made its way to Adolf Hitler, who ordered that they be executed upon capture. On 13 June 1942, the Oberkommando der Wehrmacht sent a secret message to Panzer Army Africa which was intercepted by British intelligence and forwarded to Prime Minister Winston Churchill stating: "Are said to be numerous German political refugees with Free French Forces in Africa. The Führer has ordered that the severest measures are to be taken against those concerned. They are therefore to be immediately wiped out in battle and in cases where they escape being killed in battle, a military sentence is to be pronounced immediately by the nearest German officer and they are to be shot out of hand, unless they have to be temporarily retained for intelligence purposes."

On the night of 13/14 September 1942, the SIG participated in Operation Agreement, the raid on the German and Italian stronghold of Tobruk. Its objective was to destroy supplies in the port. A SIG team was to infiltrate the port as part of a large group of commandos in three trucks, with the SIG operatives playing the role of German guards transporting British POWs to a camp at Tobruk. The commandos were to assault the coastal guns east of the harbor. Buck would take part alongside Lieutenant David Russell, a Scots Guards officer fluent in German. The group was led by Lieutenant Colonel John Haselden. As Buck correctly suspected that the Germans were by now aware of the SIG's existence, he assigned only a few SIG operatives to the mission rather than around a dozen as would have been preferable.

The group successfully infiltrated the port and carried out the planned attacks after the aerial attacks began, capturing a villa to be used as the headquarters after overcoming the Italian platoon holding it. They cleared several more positions. The commandos then moved slightly inland, captured four anti-aircraft guns, and held their positions against Italian counterattacks intent on recapturing the guns. They eventually destroyed the guns by rolling grenades into the barrels. However, the naval and amphibious attack failed, with the British and other Allied forces losing three ships and several hundred soldiers and Marines. With no reinforcements coming and the enemy now regrouping, the raiders had to retreat, with Buck ordering the SIG men to destroy their German uniforms and documents. Haselden was killed while covering their escape. Some of the raiders were captured while those who escaped had to walk across the desert to rejoin Allied lines. One wounded SIG member was unable to go on after 17 days and agreed to be left behind. He was found by local Arabs and handed over to the Italians, who then turned him over to the Germans. He was tortured for five days and subjected to a mock execution, refusing to divulge any information. On the intervention of a German officer he was transferred to a POW camp. The raiders who escaped reached Allied lines after marching through the desert for more than a month.

With the failure of the Tobruk raid, the SIG was disbanded. The remaining members were subsequently transferred to the Royal Pioneer Corps. From there, several joined No. 2 Commando and fought with the unit for the rest of the war.

== Tiefenbrunner account of SIG ==
In January 1999, Maurice (Monju) Tiefenbrunner, a surviving member of SIG, recorded his life story in an unpublished autobiography booklet called "A Long Journey Home". On pages 37–41, he provides information on SIG unit formation and operations. After the SIG was disbanded, Tiefenbrunner was caught by the Italians and sent to a POW camp in Italy. He was moved to a POW camp in Nazi German territory, where he met Vic Crockford. They were released in early 1945.

== Partial list of SIG members ==
List of some of the members:

- Capt. Herbert Cecil Buck, MC, 3/1 Punjabis [service no.: IA. 1117]. Killed in an aircraft crash just after the war: 22 November 1945, aged 28.
- Maurice "Tiffen" (Monju) Tiefenbrunner (a veteran of No. 51 (Palestine) Commando and later a member of the SAS) - MiD
- Aryeh Shai - survived the war and wrote details of the Lions of Judah.
- Dov Cohen, a veteran of No. 51 Commando and, after the war, a member of the Jewish Irgun organization, also known - from its initials - as (Etzel), where he was known as 'Shimshon'. Killed at the age of 32 during the Acre Prison break in 1947.
- Bernard Lowenthal, also menber of Etzel, Irgun.
- Lt. Herbert Delmonte-Nietto-Hollander, attached from the largely Jewish Tower Hamlets Rifles, part of the London Regiment; British born of a German father. Attended St. Pauls School, London. Army officers Welterweight Boxing champion 1937/8. Later Staff officer at Ranby POW Camp Notts and subsequently interrogator at Belsen concentration camp of Joseph Kramer.
- Israel Carmi, later a Captain in the Jewish Brigade and an officer of the Israel Defense Forces
- Karl Kahane, served in the Austro-Hungarian Army during World War I. He was a Town Clerk in Austria until forced to flee after the Anschluss. Later a founding member of the IDF's Paratroopers Brigade.
- Dolph Zentner, a veteran of No. 51 (Palestine) Commando
- Philip [Shraga-Iser] Kogel, a veteran of No. 51 (Palestine) Commando
- Walter Essner, German POW - non-Jewish traitor, later shot and killed while trying to escape.
- Herbert Brueckner, German POW - non-Jewish traitor
- Charlie 'Chunky' Hillman/aka "Steiner", (Austrian Nazi Baiter) - MC and Bar
- Eliyahu Gottlieb (Eliyahu Gottlieb)- from Czechoslovakia, killed in action June 1942 behind enemy lines in Derna, Libya.
- Peter Haas - killed in action in June 1942 behind enemy lines in Derna, Libya.
- Josef Rosenzweig
- Opprower/aka "Weizmann" - actively lobbied the British government to form Jewish military units to fight Nazi Germany.
- H. Wilenski/aka "Goldstein" - killed in action in June 1942 behind enemy lines in Derna, Libya.
- Rohr/aka "Berg"

== Popular culture ==
The 1967 film Tobruk was about a raid of the SIG and the Long Range Desert Group (LRDG) on a German Afrika Korps fuel depot in Tobruk, starring Rock Hudson and George Peppard. The film depicting elements of Operation Agreement shows the raid to be successful. In the 2022 BBC TV series SAS: Rogue Heroes, the failure of the Derna raid and its betrayal by Brueckner are depicted in one of the episodes.

== See also ==
- Jewish Brigade
- Jewish partisans
- Jewish resistance under Nazi rule

== Bibliography ==
- Tasselli, Silvio (November 2000). "Special Interrogation Group 'S.I.G.'". Storia e Battaglie (in Italian). 1 (5): 2–11.
