= Tex Banwell =

British Army soldier

Keith Deamer Banwell BEM
- Born: 8 October 1917; Newport, Essex, England
- Died: 25 July 1999 (aged 81); London, England
- Burial place: Arnhem Oosterbeek War Cemetery, Netherlands
- Military career
- Allegiance: United Kingdom
- Branch: British Army; Territorial Army
- Service years: 1936–1970s
- Rank: Sergeant
- Nickname: "Tex"
- Service number: 22290927
- Units: Coldstream Guards; Hampshire Regiment; No. 52 Commando; Long Range Desert Group; 10th Parachute Battalion
- Conflicts: World War II • North African campaign • Operation Market Garden
- Awards: British Empire Medal; Resistance Memorial Cross (Netherlands)

Sergeant Keith Deamer "Tex" Banwell BEM (8 October 1917 – 25 July 1999) was a soldier in the British Army in the Second World War. He is best known for serving as a political decoy for Field Marshal Sir Bernard Montgomery, and for being imprisoned in Auschwitz.

== Military service ==
Banwell was born in Newport, Essex. His father served with the Australian Imperial Force, and Banwell lived in Australia from 1920 until he returned to England in 1936 to join the Coldstream Guards. He later transferred to 1st Battalion, the Hampshire Regiment, and served in India, Palestine and then Egypt, where he was a temporary physical training instructor, and was given the nickname "Tex". After the outbreak of war, he volunteered for special service and joined No. 52 (Middle East) Commando, and then the Long Range Desert Group. He was captured in 1942 during a raid on Tobruk, but he and a friend stole a German vehicle and escaped back to British lines.

He was captured a second time during a raid on Crete. Taken prisoner near Heraklion, he was guarded by Max Schmeling, a former world heavyweight boxing champion. Banwell escaped again with some friends on a stolen assault landing craft, but they ran out of fuel and drifted for nine days before reaching the coast of North Africa. Banwell's resemblance to General Montgomery was noticed while he was hospitalised for three months to recover. Banwell was dressed up in a similar uniform to Montgomery, and driven around North Africa as Montgomery's double to confuse German spies. He was taller than Montgomery, so was instructed to remain seated in a vehicle while out in public.

Bored with this role, Banwell joined the 10th Battalion, Parachute Regiment. He became an accomplished cross-country runner and boxer, and was also practised in judo. He was a platoon sergeant when he took part in Operation Market Garden in September 1944. He was wounded and captured, but escaped during the journey to a prisoner of war camp with Lieutenant Leo Heaps of the 1st Battalion, Parachute Regiment, and Staff-Sergeant Alan Kettley of the Glider Pilot Regiment. The three escapees made contact with the Dutch resistance. Banwell agreed to become a weapons instructor, demonstrating how the Dutch should use their new British weapons, while the other two escaped. He took the codename "Tex", and was involved in several resistance ambushes of the occupying Germans - including an action near the town of Putten on 1 October 1944, after which 600 local men were arrested and deported to Neuengamme concentration camp. Eventually, Banwell was captured by the Germans again; he was flown to Berlin and interrogated by the Gestapo about his connections with the Dutch resistance. He refused to betray his friends and faced two dummy firing squads before he was sent to Auschwitz concentration camp. He survived four months of a starvation diet, confined in a 6 foot (1.8 m) square cage. He was then moved to Fallingbostel, where he was liberated by the Red Army in March 1945, having lost half his body weight.

== Post-war ==
Banwell rejoined the 10th Battalion, Parachute Regiment when it was reformed as a Territorial Army unit in 1947, and continued to serve in the British Army until the 1970s, retiring as a sergeant. He then joined the Post Office, and also served as a special constable. He continued parachuting as a hobby, and made his 1,000th jump at Arnhem in September 1984 (the 40th anniversary of the battle), and his 1,001st and final jump in Arnhem in 1994 for the 50th anniversary.

His wartime experiences were included in the book The Grey Goose of Arnhem, published in 1977 by Leo Heaps, the Canadian who also served at Arnhem with the 1st Battalion of the Parachute Regiment (and son of Canadian politician Abraham Albert Heaps). He was awarded the British Empire Medal in the 1969 New Year Honours and the Dutch Resistance Memorial Cross in 1982 (one of very few members of the British Armed Forces to receive this award).

== Personal life and death ==
Banwell married his first wife, Winifred, on 4 March 1944; they had a son and two daughters. He died in London. His survivors included the three children of his first marriage, and his second wife, Elsie. His ashes were buried in the Airborne Cemetery in Oosterbeek in September 1999, and his battledress jacket and medals are on display at the Airborne Museum at the former Hotel Hartenstein also in Oosterbeek.
