= Geoffrey Keyes (VC) =

Recipient of the Victoria Cross

Lieutenant-Colonel Geoffrey Keyes VC MC
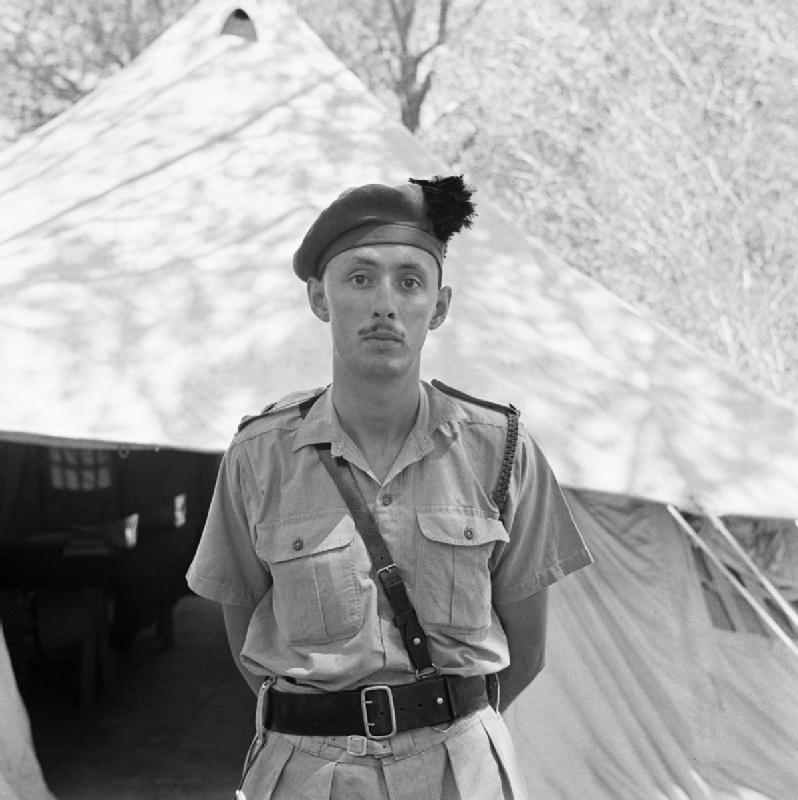
- Born: 18 May 1917; Aberdour, Fife, Scotland
- Died: 18 November 1941 (aged 24); Beda Littoria, Libya
- Burial place: Benghazi War Cemetery, Libya
- Relatives: Admiral of the Fleet Roger Keyes, 1st Baron Keyes (father)
- Military career
- Allegiance: United Kingdom
- Branch: British Army
- Service years: 1937–1941
- Rank: Lieutenant-Colonel
- Service number: 71081
- Units: Royal Scots Greys; No. 11 (Scottish) Commando; Middle East Commando
- Conflicts: Second World War: Norwegian campaign; Narvik campaign; Mediterranean and Middle East theatre; Syria–Lebanon campaign; Battle of the Litani River; North African campaign; Western Desert campaign; Operation Crusader; Operation Flipper
- Awards: Victoria Cross; Military Cross; Croix de Guerre (France)

Lieutenant-Colonel Geoffrey Charles Tasker Keyes, VC, MC (18 May 1917 – 18 November 1941) was a British Army officer of the Second World War and a recipient of the Victoria Cross, the highest award that can be made to British and Empire forces for gallantry in the face of the enemy. At the time he was the youngest acting lieutenant-colonel in the British Army.

== Background ==
Keyes was the oldest son of Admiral of the Fleet Roger Keyes, 1st Baron Keyes, a British naval hero of the First World War and the first Director of Combined Operations during the Second World War. He attended King's Mead School in Seaford, Sussex, then Eton and the Royal Military College, Sandhurst.

Keyes was a member of the Marylebone Cricket Club.

== Second World War ==
=== Early actions ===
Geoffrey Keyes was commissioned into the Royal Scots Greys. He saw action at Narvik and was later attached to No. 11 (Scottish) Commando, which was sent to the Middle East as part of Layforce.

Following the Allied invasion of Syria on 8 June 1941, No. 11 Commando was sent to lead the crossing of the Litani River in Lebanon, fighting successfully against troops of the French Vichy régime, during which Keyes played a leading part. In this operation, Keyes earned the Military Cross. Following the action, 11 Commando returned to Cyprus, then to Egypt in August 1941, where the unit was left in limbo. Keyes, who had assumed command of the unit after his commanding officer, Colonel Richard Pedder, was killed during the Litani River offensive, was authorised to retain 110 volunteers as a troop in the Middle East Commando.

=== Operation Flipper ===
In October–November 1941, a plan was formulated at Eighth Army headquarters to attack Axis headquarters, base installations and communications. One objective was the assassination by a Commando team of Erwin Rommel, the commander of the Axis forces in North Africa. The raid was intended to disrupt enemy organisation before the start of Operation Crusader. Operation Flipper was led by Acting Lieutenant-Colonel Keyes with his superior, Lieutenant-Colonel Robert Laycock, joining as an observer. Keyes, who had been present throughout the planning stage, selected the most hazardous task for himself: the assault on the supposed headquarters of the Afrika Korps in a house near Beda Littoria. Following a botched landing by submarine, where over half the raiding party and their equipment failed to get ashore, the men endured an exhausting approach in torrential rain.

Keyes tried to enter the house but was confronted by a sentry. Keyes struggled in the doorway with the sentry until the guard was shot by Keyes' second-in-command. Surprise lost, Keyes, his second-in-command and a sergeant entered the building. Keyes was shot in the ensuing firefight, felt faint and collapsed. Shortly after a confused period inside the house Keyes's body was carried outside by his men and left. The official version is that Keyes opened the door to a nearby room, found Germans inside, closed it again abruptly, reopened it to hurl in a grenade and was shot by one of the Germans. Only one round was fired by the Germans during the raid on the HQ. Another possible explanation for this was that his fellow Commando Captain Robin Campbell fired several rounds at the sentry, one of which probably hit Keyes and led to his death a few minutes later.

The men retreated to a position from which they were later taken prisoner. The second-in-command also had to be left since he was shot in the leg by one of his own men. On Rommel's orders, Keyes was buried with full military honours in a local Catholic cemetery. It was later ascertained that the house was not Rommel's HQ but a supply centre that he seldom if ever visited; he had been in Italy at the time of the attack. Despite the debacle, Keyes was posthumously awarded the Victoria Cross, the citation read:

War Office, 19th June, 1942.

The KING has been graciously pleased to approve the posthumous award of the VICTORIA CROSS to the undermentioned officer:

Major (temporary Lieutenant-Colonel) Geoffrey Charles Tasker Keyes, M.C. (71081), The Royal Scots Greys (2nd Dragoons), Royal Armoured Corps (Buckingham).

Lieutenant-Colonel Keyes commanded a detachment of a force which landed some 250 miles behind the enemy lines to attack Headquarters, Base Installations and Communications.

From the outset Lieutenant-Colonel Keyes deliberately selected for himself the command of the detachment detailed to attack what was undoubtedly the most hazardous of these objectives—the residence and Headquarters of the General Officer Commanding the German forces in North Africa. This attack, even if initially successful, meant almost certain death for those who took part in it.

He led his detachment without guides, in dangerous and precipitous country and in pitch darkness, and maintained by his stolid determination and powers of leadership the morale of the detachment. He then found himself forced to modify his original plans in the light of fresh information elicited from neighbouring Arabs, and was left with only one officer and an N.C.O. with whom to break into General Rommel's residence and deal with the guards and Headquarters Staff.

At zero hour on the night of 17th–18th November, 1941, having despatched the covering party to block the approaches to the house, he himself with the two others crawled forward past the guards, through the surrounding fence and so up to the house itself. Without hesitation, he boldly led his party up to the front door, beat on the door and demanded entrance.

Unfortunately, when the door was opened, it was found impossible to overcome the sentry silently, and it was necessary to shoot him. The noise of the shot naturally aroused the inmates of the house and Lieutenant-Colonel Keyes, appreciating that speed was now of the utmost importance, posted the N.C.O. at the foot of the stairs to prevent interference from the floor above.

Lieutenant-Colonel Keyes, who instinctively took the lead, emptied his revolver with great success into the first room and was followed by the other officer who threw a grenade.

Lieutenant-Colonel Keyes with great daring then entered the second room on the ground floor but was shot almost immediately on flinging open the door and fell back into the passage mortally wounded. On being carried outside by his companions he died within a few minutes.

By his fearless disregard of the great dangers which he ran and of which he was fully aware, and by his magnificent leadership and outstanding gallantry, Lieutenant-Colonel Keyes set an example of supreme self sacrifice and devotion to duty.

Author Michael Asher has pointed out that Keyes's VC citation was written by an officer who was not an eye-witness (Robert Laycock), and is at odds with the accounts of the survivors of the raid, and with German accounts; according to Asher, there is scarcely any statement in the citation that is verifiably true. Indeed, as author James Owen points out, the post-mortem conducted by the Germans showed that he had in fact been killed accidentally by one of his own men.

Asher's view is that the operation grew out of Keyes' desire to achieve the heroic status of his father, Admiral Roger Keyes. "The Rommel Raid was born out of one man's ambition to achieve glory", he has written, "and as so many times in British history, it was rescued from ignominy by the valour and determination of ordinary enlisted men, none of whom played a part in its planning, nor were even told the nature of their mission before they embarked."

== Memorials ==
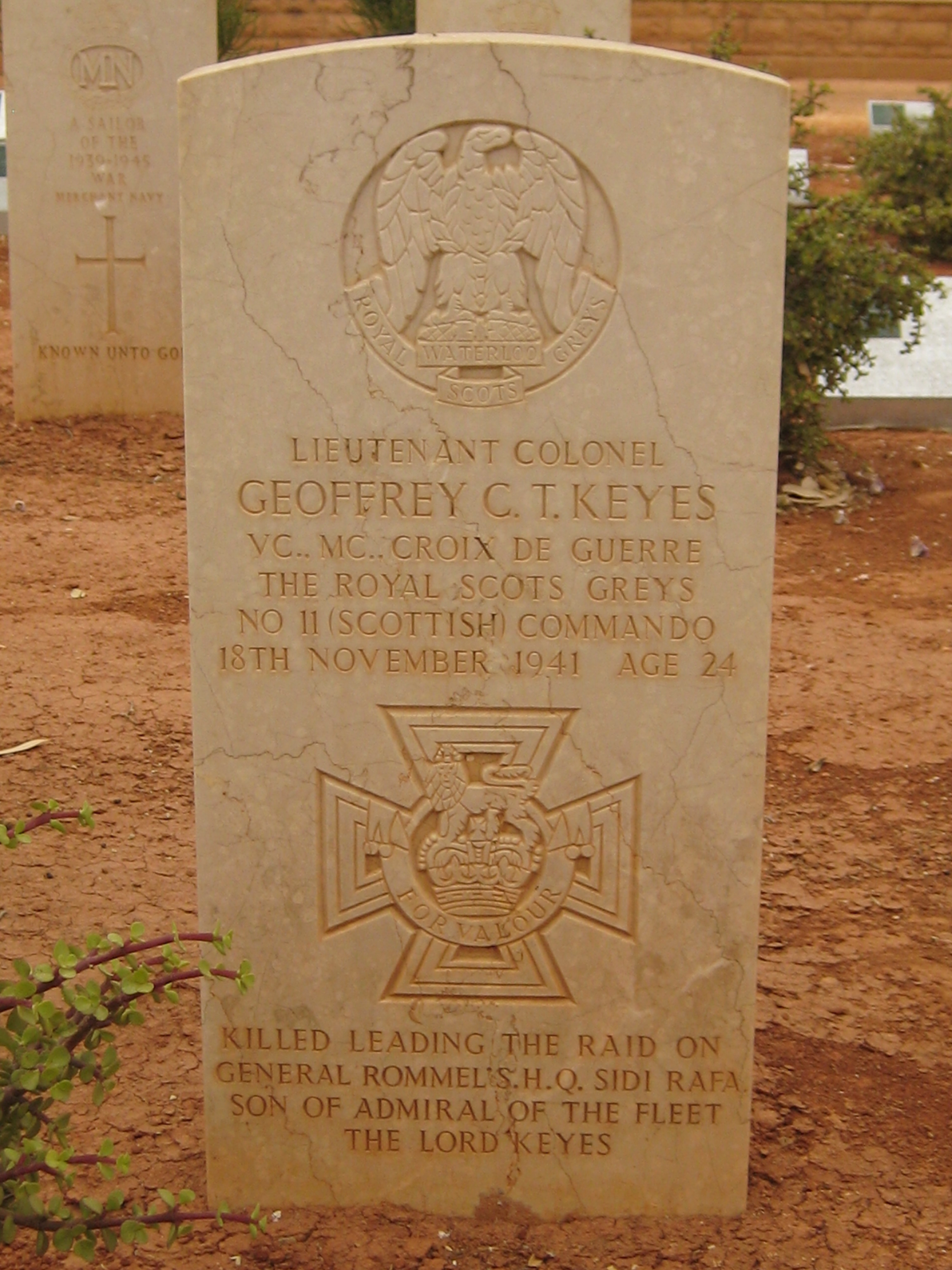
Grave of Lieutenant-Colonel Geoffrey Charles Tasker Keyes, VC, MC (18 May 1917 – 18 November 1941) Benghazi War Cemetery, Benghazi, Libya

His body was later moved to Benghazi War Cemetery in Libya. He is remembered on the King's Mead School War memorial in Seaford, Sussex and also in the parish church in the village of Tingewick in Buckinghamshire, home of the Keyes family. His VC is on display in the Lord Ashcroft Gallery at the Imperial War Museum, London.

== Reading list ==
- Keyes, Elizabeth. Geoffrey Keyes, V.C., M.C., Croix de Guerre, Royal Scots Greys, lieut.-colonel, 11th Scottish Commando (London : G. Newnes, [1956])
- Asher, Michael. Get Rommel: The secret British mission to kill Hitler's greatest general (Cassell Military Paperbacks, [2005])
- Owen, James. Commando (Little, Brown, [2012])
- John, Laffin (1997). British VCs of World War 2: A Study in Heroism. Sutton Publishing. ISBN 0-7509-1026-7.
- Buzzell, Nora, ed. (1997). The Register of the Victoria Cross. Cheltenham, Gloucestershire: This England Alma House. ISBN 0-906324-27-0.
