= Italian submarine Jantina =

Jantina was the name of at least two ships of the Italian Navy and may refer to:

- Italian submarine Jantina (1912), a Medusa-class submarine launched in 1912 and discarded in 1918.
- Italian submarine Jantina (1932), an Argonauta-class submarine launched in 1932 and sunk in 1941.
