= HMS Torbay (N79) =

Submarine of the Royal Navy

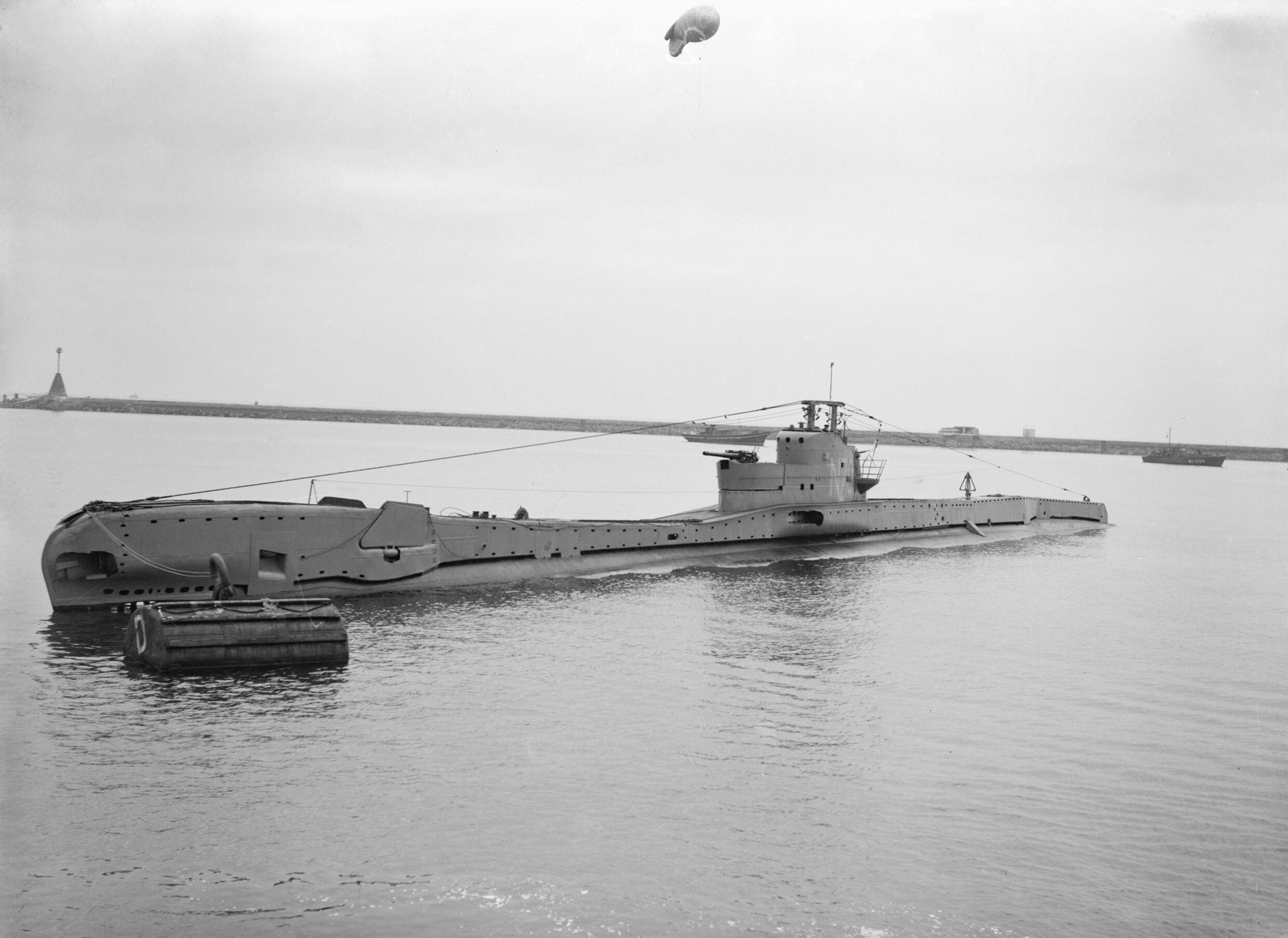
- HMS Torbay

History

United Kingdom
- Name: HMS Torbay
- Namesake: Torbay
- Builder: Chatham Dockyard
- Laid down: 21 November 1938
- Launched: 9 April 1940
- Commissioned: 14 January 1941
- Identification: Pennant number N79
- Fate: Sold for breaking up 19 November 1945, scrapped March 1947
- Badge

General characteristics
- Class & type: T-class submarine
- Displacement: 1,090 long tons (1,107 t) surfaced; 1,575 long tons (1,600 t) submerged
- Length: 275 ft (84 m)
- Beam: 26 ft 6 in (8.08 m)
- Draught: 16.3 ft (5.0 m)
- Propulsion: Two shafts; Twin diesel engines 2,500 hp (1.86 MW) each; Twin electric motors 1,450 hp (1.08 MW) each
- Speed: 15.25 knots (28.2 km/h) surfaced; 9 kn (17 km/h) submerged
- Range: 4,500 nmi (8,300 km) at 11 kn (20 km/h) surfaced
- Test depth: 300 ft (91 m) max
- Complement: 59
- Armament: 6 internal forward-facing 21-inch (533 mm) torpedo tubes; 4 external forward-facing torpedo tubes; 1 external backward-facing torpedo tube; 6 reload torpedoes; 1 x 4-inch (102 mm) deck gun

HMS Torbay (N79) was a T-class submarine of the Royal Navy. She was laid down at Chatham Dockyard and launched on 9 April 1940.

Torbay had an active career, serving mainly in the Mediterranean, although she also served in the Pacific Far East at the end of the war.

Altogether she sank 17 merchant ships, totalling 38,000 tons, plus 5 warships and 24 sailing vessels, and was involved in an attack on Corfu harbour that won her captain, Lieutenant Commander (Lt. Cdr.) Anthony Miers, the Victoria Cross.

Torbay was also allegedly involved in two incidents of war crimes.

== Service history ==
Torbay was commissioned on 14 January 1941, under the command of Lt. Cdr. Anthony Miers.

In March 1941 she sailed from Portsmouth on her first offensive patrol, to intercept the battleships Scharnhorst and Gneisenau, which were heading for Brest after their raiding sortie in the North Atlantic. Unable to find them, Torbay was ordered to continue to Gibraltar, and, after another patrol in the Mediterranean, to join the 1st Flotilla at Alexandria.

=== Mediterranean ===
From there, Torbay operated for the next 12 months, sinking a number of ships (including the Italian submarine Jantina) and taking part in several special operations.

Some of those special operations revolved around Crete. The Torbay, among others, continued to evacuate Allied stragglers who were not captured and interned as POWs when Crete was surrendered to the Germans on 1 June. On 22 August 1941, after a night run on the surface, 130 men (including 62 New Zealanders and 63 British and Australian troops) crammed aboard the Torbay were safely delivered to Alexandria, Egypt, “establishing a record for the number of people ever jammed into one submarine.” The Torbay’s commander, Lieutenant Commander Anthony ‘Crap’ Miers, VC, was eccentric, and he made it a ritual – ‘Usual Drill, Number One’ – to salute the Vichy French sailors aboard French ships at anchor in Alexandria, Egypt, every time he entered the port. He had his crew assemble on deck and, on order, they dropped their trousers and ‘mooned’ the Vichy French sailors as they entered the harbour.

In July 1941, on her first patrol from Alexandria, Torbay was involved in two incidents of alleged war crimes. On two occasions after sinking enemy ships, Miers had Torbay's crew fire on troops as they swam in the water. Miers made no attempt to hide his actions and reported it in his official logs. He received a strongly worded reprimand from the Royal Navy after the first incident.

Torbay was involved in attacks on Axis convoys on two occasions. The attack on the first, on 10 June 1941 involved Torbay making three attack runs on an Italian convoy off the Dardanelles. The first attack failed to produce any results; the second attack resulted in a torpedo hit on the Italian tanker Utilitas but the torpedo failed to explode. In the third attack the Italian tanker Giuseppina Ghirardi was torpedoed and sunk. The attack on the second convoy took place on 12 August 1941, west of Benghazi, Libya. Torbay fired on the Italian merchant ships Bosforo and Iseo but missed both. Torbay was heavily depth charged after these attacks.

In November 1941 Torbay was tasked with landing a party of commandos, under Geoffrey Keyes, for the ill-fated Operation Flipper. On 15 December 1941 Torbay torpedoed an Italian merchant ship in German service, Sebastiano Veniero, at Methoni in the Peloponnese. Sebastiano Veniero was already beached after having been damaged a week earlier by a torpedo fired by the Grampus-class submarine HMS Porpoise.

On 4 March 1942 in Corfu Harbour, north-western Greece, Torbay, having followed an enemy convoy into the harbour the previous day, fired torpedoes at a destroyer and two 5,000 ton transports, scoring hits on the two supply ships, which almost certainly sank. Torbay then had a very hazardous withdrawal to the open sea, enduring 40 depth charges. The submarine had been in closely patrolled enemy waters for 17 hours. For this exploit, her commander, Lieutenant Commander Anthony Miers was awarded the Victoria Cross.

=== Home waters ===
In mid-1942 Torbay returned to Britain. She returned to the Mediterranean in February 1943 under the command of Lieutenant (Lt.) Robert Clutterbuck.

=== Return to the Mediterranean ===
Back in the Mediterranean, Torbay carried out a further series of successful patrols. She also had a close encounter with the German Q-ship GA 45. In October 1943 Torbay's periscope was sighted first by GA 45 which dropped depth charges very close to Torbay. The submarine later surfaced, intending to attack GA 45 with her deck gun, but the German vessel opened fire and forced her to break off the action. GA 45 did not drop any further depth charges (perhaps having run out). Torbay managed to escape damage during this encounter.

As the war in the Mediterranean quietened, Torbay was again reassigned, this time to the Pacific Far East.

=== Far East ===
Arriving in May 1945, and under the command of Lt. C.P. Norman, Torbay continued to cause losses amongst enemy shipping. She sank two Japanese sailing vessels and a coaster, and damaged a second coaster, before the end of the war.

== Post war ==
Having survived the war, Torbay was sold on 19 December 1945 and scrapped at Briton Ferry, Wales in March 1947.

== Raiding career ==
Torbay attacked and sank the following ships:-

- Twelve Greek sailing vessels, including Sofia and P III
- The Italian sailing vessels Gesu E Maria, Pozzalo, Columbo, Gesu Giuseppe E Maria and Gesu Crocifisso
- The Italian merchants Citta di Tripoli, Ischia, Maddalena G. and Lido
- Seven German sailing vessels, including L XIV, L I, L XII, L V and L VI
- The Italian submarine Jantina
- The sailing vessel Evangelista
- The German army cargo ship Bellona
- The Italian auxiliary patrol vessels R 113 / Avanguardista, V 90/San Girolamo and V 276 / Baicin
- The German auxiliary submarine chaser 13 V 2 / Delpa II
- The Danish merchant Grete
- The French merchant Lillios
- The Italian fishing vessel Madonna di Porto Salvo
- Two unknown sailing vessels
- The small Italian merchants Versilia and Tarquinia
- A Greek fishing vessel
- The German troopship Kari (the former French Ste. Colette, in turn the former Norwegian Kari)
- A German floating dock
- The German troop transport Palma (the former Italian Polcevera)
- The Spanish merchant Juan de Astigarraga and the French merchant Oasis (Both ships were under German control)
- The Italian ship Aderno (the former British Ardeola)

Torbay also damaged the following ships:-

- The Vichy French tanker Alberta
- The Italian oiler Strombo
- The German merchant Norburg. The damaged ship settled on the bottom of Iraklion harbour but was later salvaged.
- The Italian destroyer Aviere. Aviere was already grounded after being damaged on 19 November 1941 by the Polish submarine ORP Sokół.
- The Italian auxiliary minesweeper Monte Argentario
- The Italian merchant (in German service) Sebastiano Veniero.
- The Italian merchant (in German service) Trapani. Trapani was further damaged that night by the British escort destroyer HMS Hursley and the Greek escort destroyer Miaoulis. The wreck of Trapani was finally destroyed off Kalymnos, Greece the following night by the British destroyers HMS Penn and HMS Jervis.
- An unknown sailing vessel

== See also ==
USS Wahoo and U-852 for other submarines alleged to be involved in war crimes.
