= Operation Flipper =

WW2 British commando raid (Nov 1941), in North Africa

Operation Flipper or the 'Rommel Raid'
- Part of Operation Crusader during the Second World War
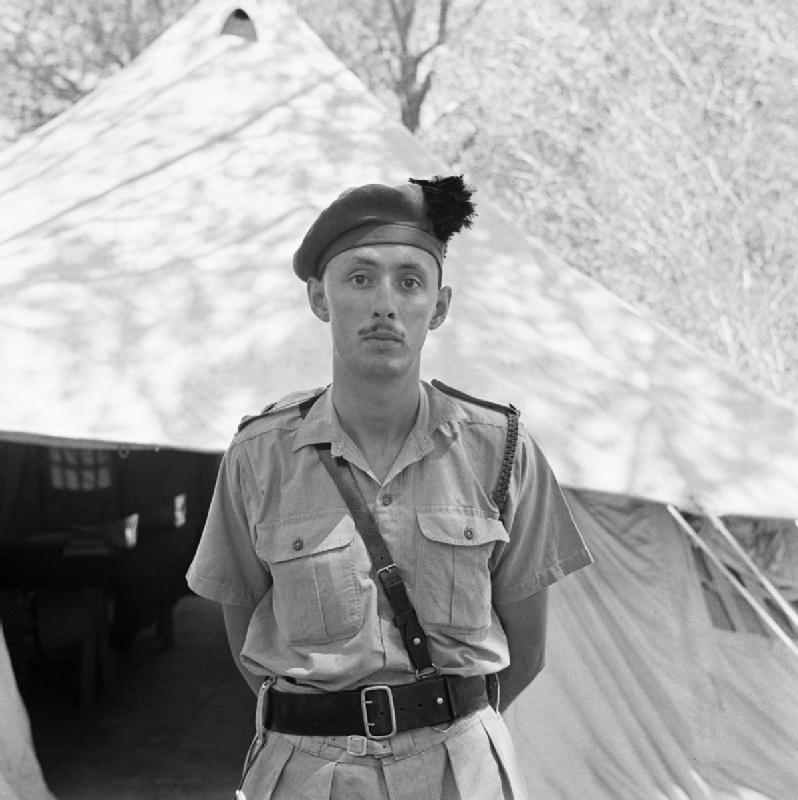
- Geoffrey Keyes VC
Date	10–18 November 1941
Location	Libya 32°55′59″N 21°44′30″E
Result	Axis victory

Belligerents
United Kingdom	Germany; Italy

Commanders and leaders
(United Kingdom) Robert Laycock (United Kingdom) Geoffrey Keyes †	(Nazi Germany) Erwin Rommel (Fascist Italy) Alfredo Mercuro

Casualties and losses
2 killed 28 captured (incl. 3 wounded)	4 killed 3 wounded

Operation Flipper (also called the Rommel Raid) was a British commando raid during the Second World War, mainly by men from No. 11 (Scottish) Commando. The operation included an attack on the headquarters of Erwin Rommel, the commander of Panzergruppe Afrika in North Africa. It was timed for the night of 17/18 November 1941, just before the start of Operation Crusader. The operation failed as Rommel had left the target house weeks earlier and all but two of the commandos who landed were killed or captured. One member of the Special Boat Section team, who had secured the beach for the commando party, also escaped.

== Planning ==
From October to November 1941, a plan was formulated at Eighth Army headquarters to attack: (data from Jones 2006 unless indicated)

- Rommel's presumed headquarters near Beda Littoria, some 18 mi (29 km) inland from Apollonia, Libya
- a wireless station and intelligence centre at Apollonia
- an Italian headquarters and communications cable mast at Cyrene
- the headquarters of the Italian Trieste Division near Slonta

Although not specified in the orders, the goal of the raid was to kill or capture Rommel, to disrupt German organisation before the start of Crusader. Rommel's headquarters was believed to be at Beda Littoria, because Captain John Haselden had reconnoitred the area disguised as an Arab and reported that Rommel's staff car came and went from the former Prefecture.

The operation was led by Lieutenant-Colonel Robert Laycock; Lieutenant-Colonel Geoffrey Keyes, present throughout the planning stage, selected the most hazardous task of the attack on Rommel's headquarters for himself. Unbeknownst to the planners, Beda Littoria had only briefly been Rommel's headquarters and had been taken over by the chief quartermaster of Panzergruppe Afrika, General Schleusener. Some weeks earlier, Rommel had moved his headquarters nearer to Tobruk to be close to the action. Rommel was not even in North Africa during Flipper, having gone to Rome to request replacements for supply ships sunk by the British.

== Raid ==
=== 10–14/15 November ===
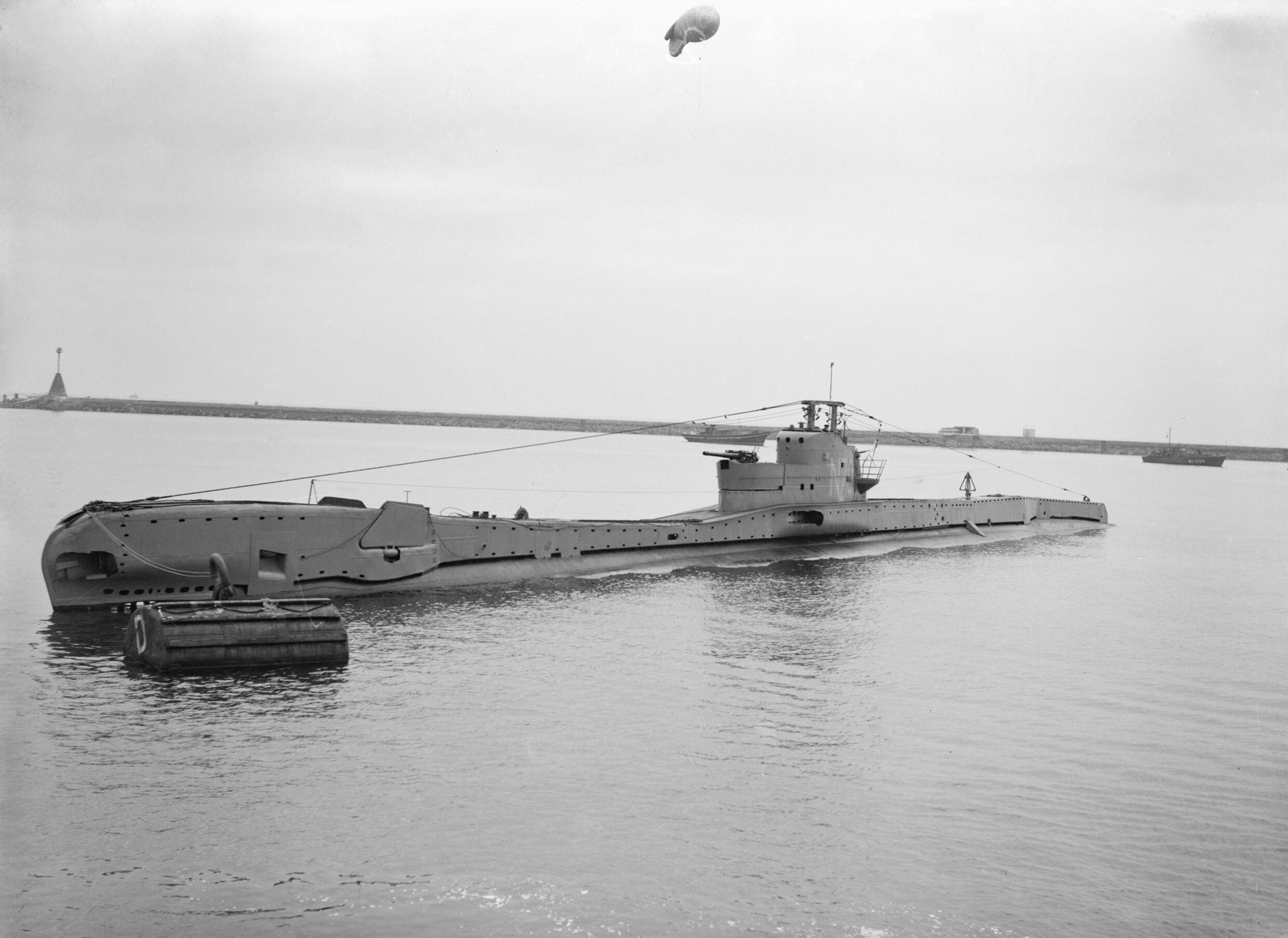
Submarine HMS Torbay

On 10 November, HMS Torbay carried Keyes, Captain Robin Campbell, Lieutenant Roy Cooke and 25 men. HMS Talisman transported Laycock, Captain Glennie, Lieutenant David Macbeth Sutherland and 25 men from Alexandria.

On the night of 14/15 November 1941, Keyes' detachment landed on the beach of Khashm al-Kalb (The Dog's Nose), guided by two-man Special Boat Section (SBS) teams in folboats (folding canoes). The beach lay near a place known as Hamama, some 250 mi (400 km) behind Axis lines. Once ashore, they made contact with Haselden, delivered earlier by the Long Range Desert Group for reconnaissance. The weather deteriorated and Laycock's group had a much more difficult time getting ashore. Laycock and seven men landed but the rest were stranded on Talisman. With only 34 of the 59 men available, instead of four detachments attacking the targets, there were only to be three.

Laycock remained at the rendez-vous with three men to secure the beach, Keyes led his detachment of 25 men for the attack on Rommel's supposed headquarters, while Lieutenant Cooke took six men to destroy the communications facilities near Cyrene. Haselden's detachment completed its mission and was picked up by the LRDG.

=== 15–18 November ===
Shortly before first light, Keyes' men moved to a wadi, where they sheltered until dark on the second night then moved off. Their Arab guide refused to accompany the party in the deteriorating weather. Keyes then led his men on a 1,800 ft (550 m) climb, followed by an approach march of 18 mi (29 km) in pitch dark and torrential rain. Hiding in a cave during the day, the detachment advanced to within a few hundred yards of the objective by 22:00 on the third night. At 23:59, Keyes led his party past sentries and other defences up to the house. Unable to find an open window or door, Keyes took advantage of Campbell's excellent German by having him pound on the front door and demand entrance. They set upon the sentry who opened the door. Campbell shot him and Keyes might have been wounded in the scuffle. The official version is that Keyes opened the door to a nearby room, found Germans inside, closed it again abruptly, reopened it to hurl in a grenade and was shot by one of the Germans. Only one round was fired by the Germans during the raid on the HQ.

Keyes was taken outside but quickly died. Shortly afterwards, Campbell was accidentally shot in the leg by one of his own men. He passed command to Sergeant Jack Terry and remained behind. Terry gathered the raiding team and retreated with 17 men to rejoin Laycock at the beach. An Italian source, not explicit in naming the British names, points that Cooke's men encountered a platoon of Italian police paratroopers. The Italians had been searching for the British raiders close to the village Mansura (about 9 mi (15 km) north of Cyrene).

=== 19 November ===
According to the source, 2nd Lieutenant Alfredo Sandulli Mercuro and the 3rd Platoon, 2nd Company, 1° Battaglione Paracadutisti Carabinieri Reali encountered what he thought was a band of Arabs hiding along a mountain ridge on 19 November. When Mercuro's Arabic interpreter called out to them, the Italians were fired on and the paratroopers engaged what they now knew were British commandos, who withdrew to a cave. With no way out, the wounded commandos surrendered after Mercuro threatened to use flamethrowers on them. The paratroops took prisoner a group consisting of an officer, one NCO and three other ranks. Except for the officer, all the British were wounded and received medical treatment from the Italians. Mercuro searched the cave and found small arms and three demolition charges. The Italians suffered three wounded during the fight.

It proved impossible for the Laycock party to re-embark on the submarines and they waited for the weather to improve. They were discovered and exchanged fire with local Italian gendarmes (and German troops by some accounts). Aware that they could not hope to stand off the large force that was surely being organised, Laycock ordered the men to scatter. Laycock and Terry made it to safety after 37 days in the desert and Bombardier John Brittlebank, one of the SBS team who had guided the commandos in the folbots, escaped and survived alone in the desert for forty days until picked up by Allied troops. The rest of the raiding force was captured, some of them wounded. Contrary to some reports, only Keyes was killed by the Germans; one man had drowned during the landing.

== Nominal roll ==
Reconstructed by Michael Asher (2004), based on a list by Hans Edelmaier, amended from documentary and witness evidence, with the assistance of the Commando Association [now defunct]. It might contain errors.

Captured, unless otherwise noted.

- Beach party
  - Lt. Col. Robert Laycock, Royal Horse Guards (escaped)
  - Sgt. Charles Nicol, Gordon Highlanders
  - Bdr. George Dunn, Royal Artillery
  - L/Cpl. Larry Codd, Royal Corps of Signals
  - Pte. E.C. Atkins, Beds & Herts Regt
  - Lt. John Pryor, Beds & Herts Regt & SBS (wounded and captured)
  - Bdr. John Brittlebank, Royal Artillery & SBS (escaped)
  - Pte. Robert Fowler, Cameron Highlanders
- German HQ assault party
  - Lt. Col Geoffrey Keyes, Royal Scots Greys (killed)
  - Capt. Robin Campbell, General List (wounded and captured)
  - Sgt. Jack Terry, Royal Artillery (escaped)
  - L/Cpl. Dennis Coulthread, Royal Scots
  - L/Bdr. A. Brodie, Royal Artillery
  - Cpl/Interpreter Avishalom Drori (Palestine), 51 ME Commando
- German HQ covering party
  - L/Cpl. William Pryde, Cameron Highlanders
  - Cpl. A.E. Radcliffe, RASC, (wounded and captured)
  - Pte. John Phiminster, Cameron Highlanders
  - L/Cpl. Frank Varney, Sherwood Foresters
  - Bdr. Joseph Kearney, (Newfoundland) Royal Artillery
  - L/Cpl. Malcolm Hughes, Manchester Regt
  - Cpl. William Heavyside, Yorks & Lancs Regt
- German HQ outside covering party
  - Sgt. Charles Bruce, Black Watch [Royal Highland Regt]
  - Cpl. Charles Lock, London Scottish [Gordon Highlanders]
  - Pte. James Bogle, Gordon Highlanders
  - Pte. Robert Murray, Highland Light Infantry
- Cyrene crossroads party
  - Lt. Roy Cooke, Royal W. Kent Regt
  - Sgt. Frederick Birch, Liverpool Scottish [Cameron Highlanders]
  - Cpl. John Kerr, Cameron Highlanders
  - Gnr. James Gornall, Royal Artillery
  - L/Bdr. Terence O'Hagen, Royal Artillery
  - Gnr. P. Macrae, Royal Artillery
  - Pte. Charles Paxton, Cameron Highlanders

== Aftermath ==
On 17 November 1941, the day of the raid, Rommel was in Italy, having left for Rome on 1 November, which became known to British military intelligence via Ultra on 17 November and that he was due back in Africa on 18 November. An emergency signal was sent to Middle East Command but was too late to stop the operation. On 15 November, a decrypt of an Italian C 38m machine cipher had revealed that the Italians knew from diverse sources that a British landing was imminent near Apollonia.

The German historian Hans Edelmaier suggests that Rommel was not the objective of the raid and his name not featuring in the plan supports this. There is no proof that Haselden reported Rommel's presence at the house in Beda and it has never been explained how Rommel was to be found or recognised by the commando unit. The only extant evidence that Rommel was the object of the raid came from a witness, Gunner Jim Gornall, who related that Keyes briefed the men on board the Torbay that their objective was to "get Rommel". When news of the raid reached him, Rommel was said to be indignant that the British should believe his headquarters was 250 mi (400 km) behind the front; Rommel preferred to be near the front line with his troops.

=== Casualties ===
The British suffered two men killed, 28 captured (three wounded) and three men escaped; German casualties were four killed and three wounded. Keyes' body and those of the four dead Germans were buried with military honours on Rommel's orders in a local Catholic cemetery. For his actions Keyes was posthumously awarded the Victoria Cross. The citation for the award was written by Robert Laycock, who contrary to British military custom, was not a witness to Keyes' actions on the night in which he was killed. Almost none of the statements in the citation are verifiable and some contradict witness accounts.

Sergeant Jack Terry was awarded the Distinguished Conduct Medal (DCM) and Bombardier John Brittlebank (SBS) later received the DCM for actions including the Rommel Raid. Gunner Jim Gornall was awarded the Military Medal (MM). (Another attempt, this time by an SAS group, was made to kidnap or assassinate Rommel in Operation Gaff in July 1944 but Rommel had suffered skull fractures in an RAF attack eleven days earlier.)

== Bibliography ==
- Asher, Michael (2004). Get Rommel: The Secret British Mission to Kill Hitler's Greatest General. London: Weidenfeld & Nicolson. ISBN 978-0-297-84685-7.
- Brighton, Terry (2009). Masters of Battle: Monty, Patton and Rommel at War. London: Penguin. ISBN 978-0-14-102985-6.
- Cursi, Enrico (2014). I leoni de deserto : storia del primo battaglione paracadutisti Carabinieri reali, 1940–1942 [The Lions of the Desert, History of the First Royal Carabinieri Parachute Battalion]. Memori (in Italian). Roma: Edizione Chillemi. ISBN 978-88-96522-49-3.
- Edelmaier, Hans (2000). Das Rommel-Unternehmen: der Überfall britischer Commandos auf den vermuteten Gefechtsstand General Rommels bei Beda Littoria in der Nacht vom 17. zum 18. November 1941 [The Raid on Rommel: The British Commando Raid on the Suspected Headquarters General Rommel at Beda Littoria on the Night of 17/18 November 1941] (in German). Salzburg: Osterreichischer Miliz-Verlag. ISBN 978-3-901185-19-9.
- Hinsley, F. H. (1994) [1993]. British Intelligence in the Second World War. Its influence on Strategy and Operations (abridged). History of the Second World War (2nd rev. ed.). London: HMSO. ISBN 978-0-11-630961-7.
- Jones, Tim (2006). SAS Zero Hour: The Secret Origins of the Special Air Service. London: Greenhill Books. ISBN 978-1-85367-669-7.
- Mortimer, G. (2014). Kill Rommel! Operation Flipper 1941. Raid (ebook ed.). Oxford: Osprey. ISBN 978-1-4728-0111-1.
- Pitt, B. (2001) [1980]. The Crucible of War: Auchinleck's Command. Vol. II (repr. 3 vol. Cassell ed.). London: Jonathan Cape (2 vol.). ISBN 0-304-35951-3.
