= Twin Pimples raid =

Military action during the siege of Tobruk in the Second World War

Twin Pimples Raid
- Part of the Siege of Tobruk, during the Second World War
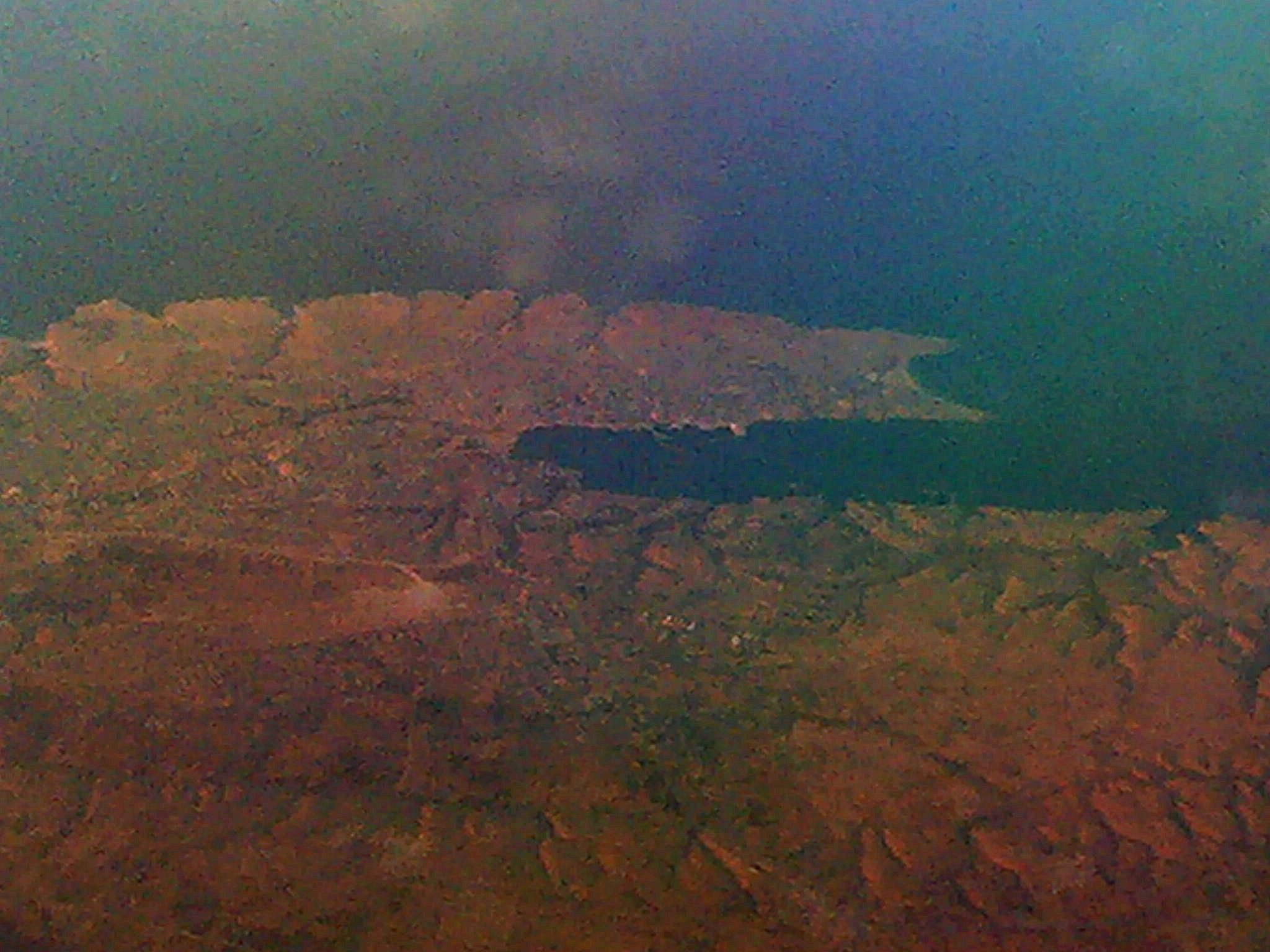
- Modern aerial photograph of Tobruk
Date	17/18 July 1941
Location	Tobruk 32°06′31.3″N 23°50′07.4″E
Result	British victory

Belligerents
United Kingdom; British India; Australia	Italy

Commanders and leaders
M. Keely	

Units involved
No. 8 (Guards) Commando; Royal Australian Engineers; 18th King Edward's Own Cavalry	132 Armoured Division Ariete; 101 Motorised Division Trieste; 17 Infantry Division Pavia; 25 Infantry Division Bologna; 27 Infantry Division Brescia (Note: These are the units besieging Tobruk at the time; the unit on the Twin Pimples is not known)

Strength
43 Commandos engineer detachment	

Casualties and losses
1 dead 4 wounded	1 ammunition dump and several mortars destroyed. 200 dead (Italian claim).

The Twin Pimples Raid was a British Commando raid on a feature in the Italian lines during the siege of Tobruk in the Second World War. The raid, carried out by men of the No. 8 (Guards) Commando and the Royal Australian Engineers, was a complete success. However it did not end the siege; that continued until November 1941, when the Allied advance during Operation Crusader reached the town.

== Background ==
During 1941, the British Commando formation Layforce were tasked to carry out a campaign of harassment and dislocation against enemy forces in the Mediterranean. At the time that Layforce was raised, the British were in the ascendency in the theatre, as they had largely defeated the Italians. It was felt that the Commandos could be employed in the capture of the island of Rhodes. However, the arrival of the Afrika Korps in Cyrenaica and the invasion of Yugoslavia and Greece greatly changed the strategic outlook. By the time Layforce arrived in Egypt in March the situation had become dire. The deployment of forces to Greece meant that the Commandos became the only troops in general reserve. As the strategic situation worsened, it became increasingly difficult to employ them in the manner intended, as they were called upon as reinforcements to the rest of the army.

In May 1941 the majority of Layforce were sent as reinforcements to the Battle of Crete. Almost as soon as they landed it was decided that they could not be employed in an offensive role and would instead be used to cover the withdrawal route towards the south. They were ill-equipped for this type of operation, as they were lacking in indirect fire support weapons such as mortars or artillery; they were armed mainly with rifles and a few Bren light machine guns. By 31 May the evacuation was drawing to a close and the Commandos, running low on ammunition, rations, and water, fell back towards Sphakia. In the end, the vast majority of the Commandos were left behind on the island, becoming prisoners of war. By the end of the operation about 600 of the 800 Commandos that had been sent to Crete were listed as killed, missing or wounded; only 179 Commandos managed to get off the island. Shortly after being evacuated from Crete, a detachment of 75 men from No. 8 (Guards) Commando was sent to Tobruk to assist the Allied forces holding out against the Axis powers that had the city under siege.

== Raid ==
The Twin Pimples was a feature in the Axis lines surrounding Tobruk. It was a defensive strong point consisting of two hills very close together that dominated the opposing Allied lines and at the time of the raid was held by units of the Italian Army. The 18th King Edward's Own Cavalry, normally part of the 3rd Indian Motor Brigade, held the line across from the Twin Pimples when it was decided to take out the Italian position. The No. 8 Commando was selected to carry out the operation and for some days prior they conducted patrols with the Indians to get to know the lay of the land.

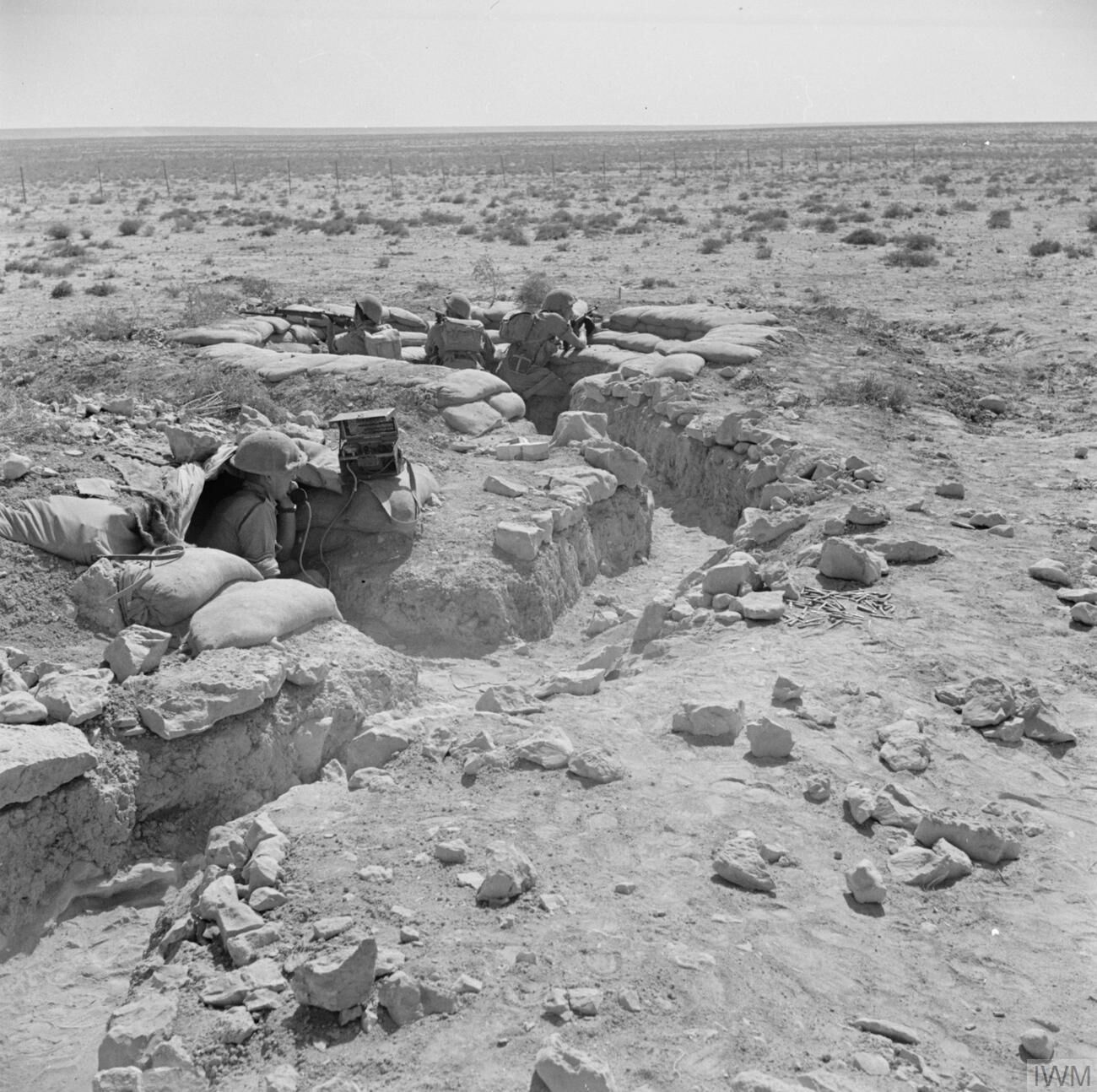
Allied trench on the Tobruk perimeter

The plan called for three officers and 40 men of No. 8 Commando and a small number of Australian Engineers (to deal with ammunition dumps and gun emplacements) to cross the Italian forward positions to the road that they used to bring up supplies and then follow the road to the rear of the Twin Pimples and engage the position from behind. The 18th Cavalry were to carry out a diversionary raid just before the commando assault to divert the defenders' attention. The man chosen to lead the raid was Captain M. Keely, the second in command was Captain Dunne and the third officer was Lieutenant Lewes On the night of the raid, 17/18 July, half the Commandos were armed with Thompson submachine guns and the other half with Lee–Enfield rifles with bayonets fixed. All carried hand grenades and every third man wore a groundsheet slung bandoleer fashion to use as a stretcher.

The Commandos left their own lines at 23:00 hours on 17 July and crossed the Italian forward positions and main lines undetected. Upon reaching the supply road they had to take cover and wait, as the attack was planned for 01:00 hours on 18 July. They moved closer to their objective just prior to the start of the diversionary attack by the 18th Cavalry. The diversion was a success, and Italian machine-gun fire and very lights were directed towards the Indian cavalrymen. The Commandos managed to get within 30 yards (27 m) on the Twin Pimples before being challenged. The challenge was answered by a frontal attack by the Commandos. So as not to confuse their own forces with the Italians in the darkness, the password Jock was used when a position had been taken. The fire fight lasted about four minutes and the Australian Engineers planted explosives on several mortars and an ammunition dump. The planners had estimated that the Commandos could spend no longer than 15 minutes on the Italian position before it was engaged by the Italian artillery. The raiders had only got about 100 yards (91 m) from the Twin Pimples when the Italian artillery started to come down onto their own position.

== Aftermath ==
The cost of the raid to the Commandos was five wounded, one of whom later died of his wounds. The No. 8 Commando, together with the rest of Layforce, was disbanded soon after. The operational difficulties that had been exposed, combined with the inability of the high command to fully embrace the commando concept, had largely served to make them ineffective. Two members of No. 8 Commando, David Stirling and Jock Lewes, would form the Special Air Service by the end of July 1941. Tobruk would remain under siege until relieved by Operation Crusader in November 1941.

The only soldier to be killed on this raid was Corporal John “Jackie” Edward Trestrail Maynard of the Duke of Cornwall's light Infantry and No 8 (Guards) Commando.

== See also ==
- List of British military equipment of World War II
- List of Australian military equipment of World War II
- List of Italian military equipment in World War II
