= No. 51 Commando =

- Active: 1940–1941
- Country: United Kingdom
- Branch: British Army
- Type: Commando
- Role: Coastal raiding force Assault Infantry
- Size: Battalion
- Part of: Combined Operations
- Engagements: Second World War

Insignia
- Identification symbol

No. 51 Commando was a battalion-sized British Commando unit of the British Army during the Second World War. The commando was formed in 1940, from a combination of Jewish and Arab volunteers in Palestine. The Commando fought against the Italians in Abyssinia and Eritrea before it was absorbed into the Middle East Commando.

== Background ==
The commandos were formed in 1940, by the order of Winston Churchill the British Prime Minister at that time. He called for specially trained troops that would "develop a reign of terror down the enemy coast". At first, they were a small force of volunteers who carried out small raids against an enemy-occupied territory, but by 1943 their role had changed into lightly equipped assault Infantry which specialised in spearheading amphibious landings.

The man initially selected as the overall commander of the force was Admiral Sir Roger Keyes—a veteran of the landings at Galipoli and the Zeebrugge raid in the First World War. However, Keyes resigned in October 1941 and was replaced by Admiral Louis Mountbatten.

By the autumn of 1940, more than 2,000 men had volunteered for commando training. They became known as the Special Service Brigade, and later on they were formed into 12 units called commandos. Each commando was composed of around 450 men commanded by a lieutenant colonel. They were sub divided into troops of 75 men and further divided into 15-man sections. Commandos were all volunteers seconded from other British Army regiments, retained their own cap badges, and remained on their regimental roll for pay. All volunteers went through the six-week intensive commando course at Achnacarry. The course in the Scottish Highlands concentrated on fitness, speed marches, weapons training, map reading, climbing, small boat operations and demolitions both day and night.

By 1943, the commandos had moved away from small raiding operations and had been formed into brigades of assault infantry to spearhead future Allied landing operations. Three units were left un-brigaded to carry out smaller-scale raids.

In December 1940, a Middle East Commando depot was formed with the responsibility of training and supplying reinforcements for the commando units in the Middle East.

== No. 51 Commando formation ==
No. 51 Commando was raised in October 1940, under the command of Lieutenant Colonel Henry J. Cator, M.C. A total of 360 volunteers from Mandatory Palestine, of whom 240 were Jews and 120 were Arabs, joined. The volunteers came from No. 1 Company, Auxiliary Military Pioneer Corps. The Commando fought against the Italians in the East African Campaign in Abyssinia and Eritrea.

In 1941, Winston Churchill ordered the formation of the Middle East Commando, made up from the commandos that remained in the Middle East. There were very few men left by this time, what men there were, were formed into six troops. No. 1 and 2 Troops were made up of L Detachment based at Geneifa under the command of David Stirling, while 60 men from the disbanded No. 11 (Scottish) Commando made up No. 3 Troop. No. 51 Commando made up No. 4 and No. 5 Troops and the Special Boat Section made up No. 6 Troop. These designations, however, were largely ignored as the men referred to themselves by their old designations.

== Battle honours ==
The following Battle honours were awarded to the British Commandos during the Second World War.

- Adriatic
- Alethangyaw
- Aller
- Anzio
- Argenta Gap
- Burma 1943–45
- Crete
- Dieppe
- Dives Crossing
- Djebel Choucha
- Flushing
- Greece 1944–45
- Italy 1943–45
- Kangaw
- Landing at Porto San Venere
- Landing in Sicily
- Leese
- Litani
- Madagascar
- Middle East 1941, 1942, 1944
- Monte Ornito
- Myebon
- Normandy Landing
- North Africa 1941–43
- North-West Europe 1942, 1944–1945
- Norway 1941
- Pursuit to Messina
- Rhine
- St. Nazaire
- Salerno
- Sedjenane 1
- Sicily 1943
- Steamroller Farm
- Syria 1941
- Termoli
- Vaagso
- Valli di Comacchio
- Westkapelle
