= Battle of the Litani River =

Battle of World War II

Battle of Litani River
- Part of the Syria-Lebanon Campaign of World War II
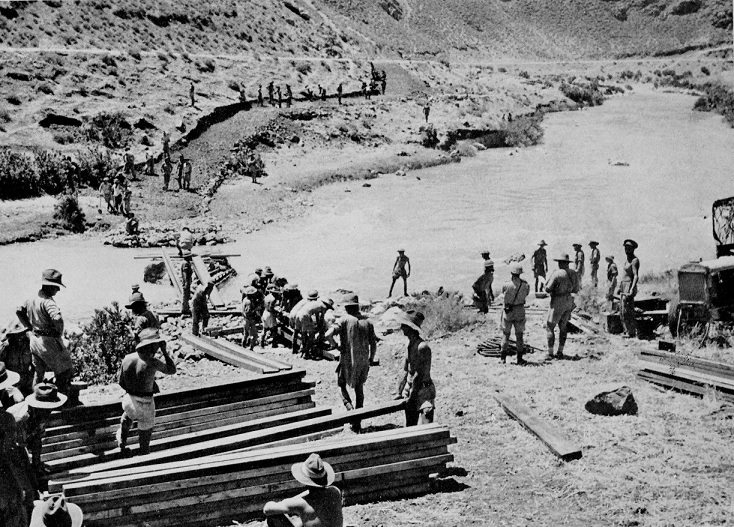
- Australian forces bridging the Litani River near Marjayoun
Date	9 June 1941
Location	French Lebanon
Result	British commonwealth victory

Belligerents
Australia; 7th Division; 21st Brigade; United Kingdom; No. 11 Scottish Commando	Vichy France; French Lebanon

Commanders and leaders
(Australia) John Lavarack (United Kingdom) Richard Pedder K.I.A (United Kingdom) Geoffrey Keyes (United Kingdom) Paddy Mayne	

The Battle of the Litani River (9 June 1941) took place on the advance to Beirut during the Syria-Lebanon campaign of the Second World War. The Australian 7th Division, commanded by Major-General John Lavarack, crossed the Litani River and later clashed with Vichy French troops.

== Battle ==
On 7 June 1941, the night before the invasion, a unit under the command of British Lieutenant General Sir Henry Maitland Wilson, which included Palmach fighters from Mandate Palestine, among them Moshe Dayan, crossed the border and secured two bridges over the Litani River. At 04:00 on the morning of 8 June, the unit captured a nearby Vichy police station. Defending that position, Dayan was struck by a French sniper bullet and lost his left eye.

During the first hour of 8 June 1941, as part of Operation Exporter, Australian forces in northern Palestine crossed the border into the French Mandate territory of southern Lebanon. Initial resistance from Vichy French forces south of the Litani River was scattered and generally disorganised.

The 21st Australian Brigade advanced along the coast road to Beirut then attempted to cross the Litani River. A surprise night-time landing by the British No. 11 (Scottish) Commando was attempted—under the command of Lieutenant Colonel Richard Pedder (Highland Light Infantry)—but was delayed by rough seas on the landing beach. The delay allowed the defenders time to destroy a nearby bridge. When the commandos eventually landed in daylight, the initial landing was almost unopposed, but in subsequent fighting the commandos took heavy losses, including Pedder, who was killed in an assault on the French barracks. He was succeeded in command by Geoffrey Keyes, whose party ultimately secured the crossing in canvas boats with assistance from the Australian troops.

A Vichy counterattack using armoured cars was driven off and a pontoon bridge was quickly completed. The Australians came under fire from two Vichy French destroyers, the Guépard and the Valmy, but Australian artillery drove off the warships.

== Aftermath ==
Following the fighting around the Litani, the 21st Brigade advanced north towards Tyre, as part of the wider move towards Beirut. From Tyre, several minor actions were fought as part of the drive to capture Sidon, which fell on 13 June. Further inland, on the 21st Brigade's right flank, the 25th Brigade advanced towards Merdjayoun, which was temporarily secured on 11 June. A small force from the 25th was subsequently left to hold Merdjayoun, while the remainder was sent north to capture Jezzine, which also fell on 13 June. However, on 15 June, a heavy counterattack fell on Merdjayoun, and heavy fighting followed until 27 June.

== See also ==
- Layforce
