= Roger Courtney =

British Army Commando (1902–1946)

Roger James Allen Courtney MC (1902 – 15 February 1946 (Note: His brother gives his date of death as 14 February 1949)), known as Jumbo, was a British soldier who established the Special Boat Sections which saw action in World War II. These would eventually lead to the formation of the Special Boat Service.

Courtney was a bank clerk in Leeds, England, before he became a professional white hunter and gold prospector in East Africa. Upon his return to England he wrote an account of his experiences, a book entitled Claws of Africa, Experiences of a Professional Big-game Hunter (published in 1934 by George G. Harrap & Co.) He was also a sergeant in the Palestinian Police Force.

When World War II began, he travelled from Africa (where he was big-game hunting) to England to join the Army as a "commando folding kayaker". When his ideas were rebuffed, he joined the King's Royal Rifle Corps as a Rifleman. Soon promoted to corporal, he was commissioned in November 1939.

Courtney became an Army Commando recruit in mid-1940, and was sent to the Combined Training Centre in Scotland. He was unsuccessful in his initial attempts to convince Admiral of the Fleet Roger Keyes and later Admiral Theodore Hallett, commander of the Combined Training Centre, that his idea of a folding kayak brigade would be effective. He decided to infiltrate HMS Glengyle, a Landing Ship, Infantry anchored in the River Clyde. Courtney paddled (with his kayak) to the ship, climbed aboard undetected, wrote his initials on the door to the captain's cabin, and stole a deck gun cover. He presented the soaking cover to a group of high-ranking Royal Navy officers meeting at a nearby hotel in Inveraray, Scotland. He was promoted to captain, and given command of twelve men, the first Special Boat Section.

Courtney's brother Gruff (G.B. Courtney) later commanded a second section of the SBS. The units carried out several raids during the early years of the war, especially in the Mediterranean, which validated Courtney's idea of mounting small-scale attacks from the sea. Gruff himself took part in Operation Flagpole (World War II). However, heavy losses led to its personnel being amalgamated in 1943 into the new Special Boat Squadron, led by George Jellicoe. Roger Courtney lost his command, became a locust control officer and died of pneumonia in Hargeisa, Somaliland aged 46.

== Bibliography ==
- Commando Little, Brown, 2012 ISBN 978-1-4087-0302-1
