= No. 11 (Scottish) Commando =

Commando unit of the British army during World War II

- Active: 1940–41
- Country: United Kingdom
- Branch: British Army
- Type: British Commando
- Role: Coastal raiding force
- Size: ~ 500 officers and men
- Part of: Layforce
- Engagements: Second World War: Operation Exporter; Operation Flipper

Commanders
- Notable commanders: Geoffrey Keyes

Insignia
- Combined Operations Shoulder Patch

No. 11 (Scottish) Commando was a battalion-sized commando unit of the British Army during the Second World War. Formed in Scotland, members of No. 11 (Scottish) Commando adopted the Tam o'shanter as their official headdress.

No. 11 (Scottish) Commando was sent to the Mediterranean as 'C' Battalion Layforce. It took part in operations in the Syria-Lebanon Campaign and then garrison duties in Cyprus. Its final raid was Operation Flipper, the attempt to capture the German commander Erwin Rommel. After the failure of this raid the commando was disbanded.

== Background ==
The commandos were formed in 1940, by the order of Winston Churchill the British Prime Minister. He called for specially trained troops that would "develop a reign of terror down the enemy coast". At first they were a small force of volunteers who carried out small raids against enemy-occupied territory, but by 1943 their role had changed into lightly equipped assault Infantry which specialised in spearheading amphibious landings.

The man initially selected as the overall commander of the force was Admiral Sir Roger Keyes himself a veteran of the landings at Gallipoli and the Zeebrugge raid in the First World War. Keyes resigned in October 1941 and was replaced by Admiral Louis Mountbatten.

By the autumn of 1940 more than 2,000 men had volunteered for commando training, and what became known as the Special Service Brigade was formed into 12 units called commandos. Each commando would number around 450 men commanded by a lieutenant colonel. They were sub divided into troops of 75 men and further divided into 15-man sections. Commandos were all volunteers seconded from other British Army regiments and retained their own cap badges and remained on their regimental roll for pay. All volunteers went through the six-week intensive commando course at Achnacarry. The course in the Scottish Highlands concentrated on fitness, speed marches, weapons training, map reading, climbing, small boat operations and demolitions both by day and by night.

By 1943 the commandos had moved away from small raiding operations and had been formed into brigades of assault infantry to spearhead future Allied landing operations. Three units were left un-brigaded to carry out smaller-scale raids.

== History ==
Formed in June 1940 from volunteers from Scottish regiments under the command of Lieutenant Colonel Richard Pedder; in February 1941, it became part of Layforce and adopted the designation of 'C' Battalion. Deploying to the Middle East, they were sent to Cyprus to garrison the island before being sent to Lebanon, where they participated in Operation Exporter.

After suffering heavy casualties in the Battle of the Litani River, fighting against the Vichy French, to secure a crossing over the Litani River in Lebanon, the unit returned to Cyprus before it was disbanded along with the rest of Layforce. Afterwards many of its men were transferred to Middle East Commando, where they formed No. 3 Troop under Lieutenant Colonel Geoffrey Keyes.

In November 1941, these men carried out a raid on Beda Littoria, in Libya as part of Operation Flipper, with the purpose of capturing Erwin Rommel in his headquarters. The raid was a failure, Keyes was killed in a fire fight at Sidi Rafa and only a handful of the men managed to escape to British lines. For his part in the raid, Keyes received the Victoria Cross posthumously. After this raid the commando role changed and No. 11 Commando along with Layforce was disbanded, due mainly to a shortage of manpower.

== Battle honours ==
The following Battle honours were awarded to the British Commandos during the Second World War.

- Adriatic
- Alethangyaw
- Aller
- Anzio
- Argenta Gap
- Burma 1943–45
- Crete
- Dieppe
- Dives Crossing
- Djebel Choucha
- Flushing
- Greece 1944–45
- Italy 1943–45
- Kangaw
- Landing at Porto San Venere
- Landing in Sicily
- Leese
- Litani
- Madagascar
- Middle East 1941, 1942, 1944
- Monte Ornito
- Myebon
- Normandy Landing
- North Africa 1941–43
- North-West Europe 1942, 1944–1945
- Norway 1941
- Pursuit to Messina
- Rhine
- St. Nazaire
- Salerno
- Sedjenane 1
- Sicily 1943
- Steamroller Farm
- Syria 1941
- Termoli
- Vaagso
- Valli di Comacchio
- Westkapelle
