= Robert Laycock =

British Army general (1907–1968)

Major-General Sir Robert Laycock KCMG CB DSO KStJ
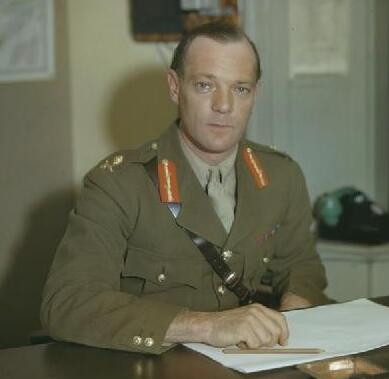
- Laycock in 1943
- Born: 18 April 1907; Westminster, London, England
- Died: 10 March 1968 (aged 60); Wiseton, Nottinghamshire, England
- Alma mater: Royal Military College, Sandhurst
- Spouse: Claire Angela Louise Dudley Ward (m. 1935)
- Relatives: Sir Joseph Laycock (father)
- Military career
- Allegiance: United Kingdom
- Branch: British Army
- Service years: 1927–1965
- Rank: Major-General
- Nickname: "Lucky"
- Service number: 37258
- Unit: Royal Horse Guards
- Commands: Layforce; Special Service Brigade; Combined Operations
- Conflicts: Second World War: Battle of France; North African campaign; Battle of Crete
- Awards: Knight Commander of the Order of St Michael and St George; Companion of the Order of the Bath; Distinguished Service Order; Knight of the Venerable Order of St John; Commander of the Legion of Merit (United States); Commander of the Legion of Honour (France); Grand Officer of the Order of Orange Nassau with Swords (Netherlands); Commander with Star of the Order of St. Olav (Norway)
- Other work: Governor of Malta; Lord Lieutenant of Nottinghamshire

Major-General Sir Robert Edward Laycock, KCMG, CB, DSO (18 April 1907 – 10 March 1968) was a senior British Army officer best known for his influential role in the establishment and command of British Commandos during the Second World War.

== Early life ==
Laycock was born in Westminster on 18 April 1907, the eldest son of Brigadier General Sir Joseph Frederick Laycock (died 1952)—an officer of the Royal Regiment of Artillery knighted for his services during the First World War—by his marriage on 14 November 1902 to Katherine Mary (Kitty) Hare (1872–1959), who was previously married to and divorced by the 6th Marquess of Downshire (died 1918), and herself a granddaughter of William Hare, 2nd Earl of Listowel. Laycock was thus a half-brother of the 7th Marquess of Downshire; their sister Josephine (died 1958) married Edward Greenall, 2nd Lord Daresbury, and is grandmother of the present Baron. Through his father's relationship with the married Daisy Greville, Countess of Warwick, issue occurring before and during his marriage with Kitty, Robert Laycock was half-brother to the Countess of Warwick's son Maynard Greville (1898–1960), and daughter, Mercy Greville (1904–1968).

Laycock was educated at Lockers Park School and Eton College, followed by officer training at the Royal Military College, Sandhurst, from which he emerged as a well-read young man with a scientific bent. He also briefly worked in a factory.

== Military career ==
In 1927, Laycock was commissioned into the Royal Horse Guards. After the Second World War broke out he raised and trained the commando unit No. 8 (Guards) Commando (8 Commando). This unit of 500 officers and men was to prove influential: one its sections, encouraged by Laycock, was an experimental marine section, known as the "Folboat Section", which ultimately developed into the Special Boat Service; and one of its officers, David Stirling, would go on to found the Special Air Service.

Laycock was promoted to lieutenant-colonel, and appointed leader of the eastern Mediterranean commando force "Layforce", named after him. This combined commando force, which included 8 Commando and four other commando units, operated from February to August 1941, and saw action in Libya (Bardia and Tobruk), Crete, and Vichy Syria. It had mixed results, but developed commando warfare. In the Battle of Crete Laycock was one of the last officers to leave the island (along with his intelligence officer Evelyn Waugh), when it was evacuated by British forces at the conclusion of the battle in May 1941. The main role of the commando force on Crete had been (atypically) to cover the evacuation of the rest of the British army, and much of the Layforce unit of 800 men was itself unable to get away: 600 of them were captured by the German army. Evelyn Waugh was an admirer of Laycock, and later dedicated his novel Officers and Gentlemen, which is set in this period and theatre, to him.

Laycock commanded the Middle East Commando from August 1941 to August 1942, in North Africa, Sicily and Italy. He then returned to the United Kingdom, was promoted to brigadier, and from 1942 to 1943 commanded the Special Service Brigade, which organised and trained all commandos in the United Kingdom. In 1943 he was promoted to major-general, and became Chief of Combined Operations, succeeding Louis Mountbatten. He held that position until 1947.

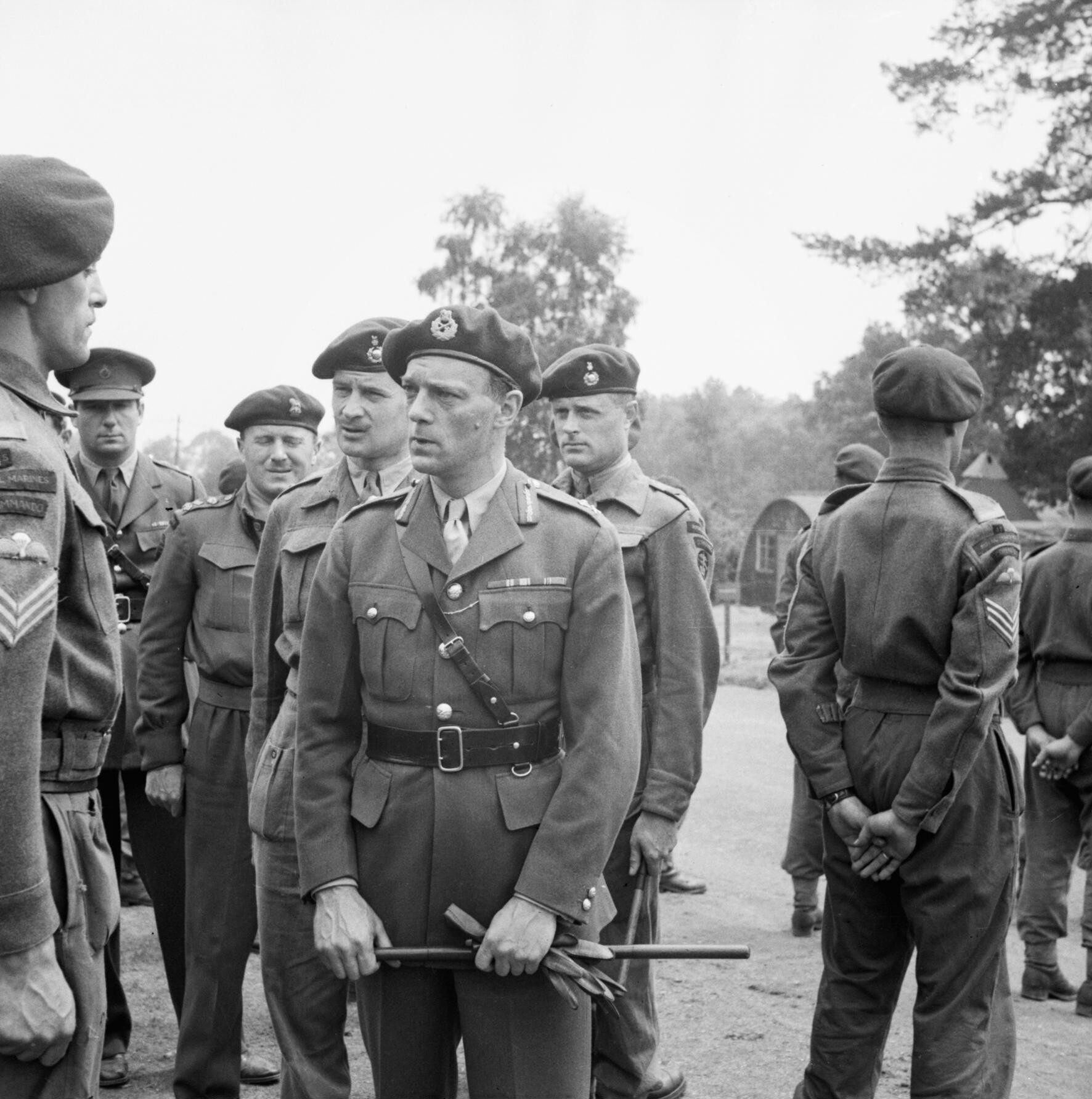
Laycock inspecting Marine Commandos shortly before the 1944 Normandy landings. Standing behind is Lieutenant Colonel Norman Charles Ries, CO of No. 45 (RM) Commando.

== Governor of Malta ==
In 1954, his old friend, Antony Head, now Secretary of State for War appointed Laycock to the position of Commander-in-Chief and Governor of Malta. This was during a period of tensions surrounding a drive for independence, with Prime Minister Dom Mintoff leading a campaign for "Integration (with Britain) or Self-Determination", and the Nationalist Party looking for a "Quasi-Dominion Status. Prior to his assuming the position of Governor, Queen Elizabeth knighted Laycock in the drawing room of Sledmere House, Yorkshire whilst staying as fellow house guests of Sir Richard Sykes, Baronet. Laycock served until 1959, having had his term extended twice.

== Later years ==
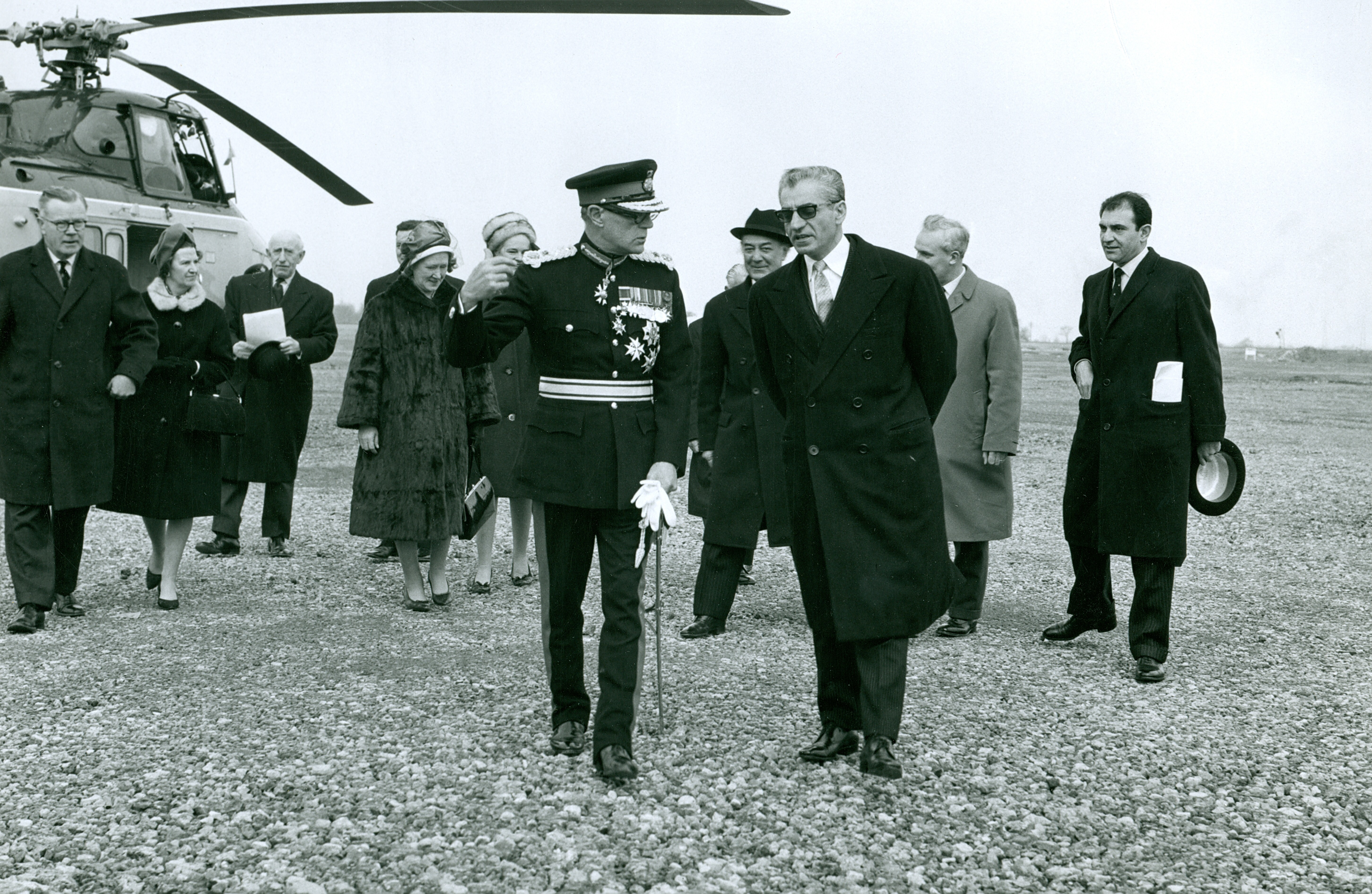
Shah of Iran visiting West Burton Power Station on 6 March 1965 with Major-General Sir Robert Laycock, the Lord Lieutenant of Nottinghamshire

From 1960 Laycock held the honorary positions of Colonel Commandant of the Special Air Service and Colonel of the Sherwood Rangers Yeomanry.

He was appointed Lord Lieutenant of Nottinghamshire in 1962.

A noted horseman, yachtsman and historical book collector, his interests made him a man who could enjoy life. It was said by many he had no enemies. He suffered from severe circulatory problems, which meant constant pain in one leg. He died at Wiseton on 10 March 1968. His estate was probated at £279,910.

== Family ==
Laycock married Claire Angela Louise Dudley Ward (1916–1999) on 24 January 1935 at St Margaret's, Westminster. Dudley Ward was the younger daughter of William Dudley Ward, Liberal MP for Southampton by his wife Freda Dudley Ward, granddaughter of Sir Thomas Isaac Birkin, 1st Baronet. Laycock and Dudley Ward had two sons and three daughters.

=== Children ===
1. Edwina Ottilie Jane Laycock (born 1936) has been twice married, and has children from both marriages.
2. Joseph William Peter Laycock (1938 – bef. 16 December 1980), accidentally drowned with his eight-year-old daughter Flora in a boating accident on the River Thames, and was survived by two children. He married 1971 Eve Lucinda Fleming (born 15 May 1947), better known as the actress Lucy Fleming, younger daughter of Peter Fleming, otherwise Lt. Col. (Robert) Peter Fleming, OBE (1907–1971) by his wife Dame Celia Johnson, actress (1908–1982). Lucy Fleming is a niece of Ian Fleming, creator of "James Bond", and has remarried.
3. Benjamin Richard Laycock (born 1947); married 1971, and has issue 1 son and 2 daughters.
4. Emma Rose Laycock, now Lady Temple (born 1943), married 1964 Sir Richard Chartier Carnac Temple, 5th Bt. (born 1937), elder son and heir of Sir Richard Antony Purbeck Temple, 4th Bt., of The Nash, MC (1913 – 5 December 2007) by his first wife Lucy Geils de Lotbinière, dau of Alain Joly de Lotbinière, of Montreal; they have issue, three daughters.
5. Katherine Martha Laycock (born 1949); married 1969 David Mlinaric (born 1939), interior designer and decorator, has three children.

== Bibliography ==
- Dictionary of National Biography
- MacDonald, Callum (1995). The Lost Battle: Crete 1941. London: Macmillan. ISBN 978-0-333-61675-8.
- Mead, Richard (2007). Churchill's Lions: a biographical guide to the key British generals of World War II. Stroud (UK): Spellmount. ISBN 978-1-86227-431-0.
- Smart, Nick (2005). Biographical Dictionary of British Generals of the Second World War. Barnesley: Pen & Sword. ISBN 1844150496.
- Mead, Richard (2016). Commando General: The Life of Major General Sir Robert Laycock KCMG CB DSO. Pen and Sword Books. ISBN 978-1473854079.
- Young, Peter (1969). Commando. London: Pan Books. ISBN 0330239163.

Government offices
Preceded by Sir Gerald Creasy	Governor of Malta; 1954–1959	Succeeded by Sir Guy Grantham
Honorary titles
Preceded by The Duke of Portland	Lord Lieutenant of Nottinghamshire; 1962–1968	Succeeded by Robert Sherbrooke
