= Middle East Commando =

- Active: 1942
- Country: United Kingdom
- Branch: British Army
- Type: Commando
- Role: Coastal raiding force Assault Infantry
- Size: Battalion
- Part of: Combined Operations
- Engagements: Second World War

Insignia
- Combined Operations Shoulder Patch

Middle East Commando was a battalion sized British Commando unit of the British Army during the Second World War. The Commando was formed in the Middle East from the survivors of the Layforce Commando unit partly to placate Winston Churchill who championed the commando idea. In December 1940 a Middle East Commando depot was formed with the responsibility of training and supplying reinforcements for the Commando units in the Middle East. The Middle East Commando was disbanded in 1942.
