= Hedgerow (disambiguation) =

A hedge or hedgerow is a line of closely spaced shrubs planted to act as a barrier or boundary.

Hedgerow may also refer to:

- Hedgerow (weapon), a variant of the Hedgehog anti-submarine mortar used to support amphibious assaults
- All the Rivers (Hebrew: גדר חיה Gader Chaya, literally: Hedgerow), a 2014 novel written by Dorit Rabinyan
- Hedgerow removal
- Hedgerow Theatre, an historic theatre in Rose Valley, Pennsylvania

== See also ==
- Hedge (disambiguation)
