= Asma Ghanem =

Palestinian artist

- أسمى
- Born: 1991 (age 34–35); Damascus, Syria
- Education: IAAP, ISDAT
- Occupations: Visual arts, photography, experimental music
- Works: Fi Alard, HOMELAND IS…, Wall Piano.

Asma Ghanem (Arabic: أسمى غانم; born 1991), is a Syrian-born Palestinian visual artist, photographer, and experimental musician. She is best known for her short documentary film, Wall Piano (2020).

== Life and career ==
Asma Ghanem was born in 1991 in Damascus, Syria, and raised in a refugee camp with her family. Ghanem graduated from the International Academy of Art Palestine - IAAP (Ramallah, Palestine) and she received the Master of Fine Arts (MFA) from the ISDAT or École des beaux-arts de Toulouse (France).

Ghanem started her career working on an experimental music project called Shams Asma (شمس أسمى). About this, she says:

I began working on an experimental music project called Shams Asma, meaning both ‘Asma’s Sun’, and ‘Highest Sun’ in Arabic. I began recording different sounds – the sounds of machines, daily movements, silence, musical instruments, electronic sounds, etc, with an aim to criticize the transformation of lifestyles and the phenomenon of construction in Palestinian cities, focusing on the questions that arise around the audio-visual transformation of ugly, yet beautiful, independent yet occupied cities, as well as other contradictions.

In 2014, she produced her first experimental album titled Fi Alard (في الأرض).

In 2015, her Photography received special mention in the Palest’In & Out festival, a festival to promote talented young Palestinian artists that it held in Paris (France) and organized by Institut Culturel Franco-Palestinien.

In 2016, her experimental music project called HOMELAND IS… won the 3rd Prize in the Young Artist Award (YAYA) of the Hassan Hourani Award.

In 2021, her documentary film Wall Piano was selected at the Tampere Film Festival (Tampereen elokuvajuhlat), a short film festival held at Finland. In this festival, it received the special mention and the Audience Award.

She currently lives in Ramallah (Palestine).

== Awards ==
- 2015: Special mention in the Palest’In & Out festival;
- 2016: 3rd Prize in the Young Artist Award (YAYA) of the Hassan Hourani Award (HOMELAND IS… - an experimental music project).
- 2021: Special mention and the Audience Award of the Tampere Film Festival (Wall Piano - a short film).

== Filmography ==
Year	Film	Writer	Director	Notes
2020	Wall Piano	✓	✓	Short film
