= Hasan Hourani =

Palestinian artist (1974–2003)

Hasan (Hassan) Hourani (Arabic: حسن حوراني, 1974 – August 6, 2003) was a Palestinian artist born in Hebron, Palestine. He attended the College of Fine Art in Baghdad, Iraq from 1993 to 1997. In 2001 he presented his one-man show "One Day, One Night" in the UN building in New York City. He then studied at the Art Students League of New York and continued to live in the city for several years. His work has been exhibited in Palestine, Iraq, Egypt, Jordan, South Korea, New York and Houston.

In 2003, he returned home for a visit. Like nearly all West Bank Palestinians, he had been barred from traveling across the Green Line to see the sea for many years; but during this trip home, he was able to visit the Mediterranean shore. On August 6, 2003 he went swimming with his young nephew Samer Abu Ajamieh and their girlfriends from Ramallah, and both drowned near the Port of Jaffa.

== Hassan Everywhere ==
At the time of his death, Hourani had completed only 10 of the 40 drawings that make up his whimsical children's book, Hassan Everywhere, in which the character Rihan roams the world in search of the rose of love. That year, his drawings were exhibited at Al-Hoash's grand opening in Jerusalem, and the next year A. M. Qattan Foundation, a Palestinian cultural foundation, established the Hassan Hourani Young Artist of the Year Award. In 2006 the Qattan Foundation compiled his completed stories and half-rendered drawings, and published Hassan Everywhere.

Hassan's friends are the birds, bees, fishes in the sea and fearful beasts, as he journeys alone but makes his home everywhere. The Paltel Virtual Gallery of Birzeit University writes that Hassan embodies the local as well as the world traveller, from ancient Egypt to the rooftops of New York: "Hassan rides the waves, is fed by the birds, flies on his magic bicycle, sits on the rooftops, always looking on to see the panorama of the world. Finally, the freedom of flight and travel of Hassan in 'Hassan Everywhere' carries particular resonance in the context of the confinement of Palestinians for whom such freedom is a dream."

== Dorit Rabinyan ==
Dorit Rabinyan's book Gader Haya ("Hedgerow" - English title: All the Rivers, novel), 2014 [גדר חיה Gader Chaya] is dedicated to Rabinyan’s former lover, Hassan Hourani, who drowned in 2003. She wrote a poignant farewell to him in The Guardian.
