= Raid on Bardia =

Amphibious landing in North Africa during the Second World War

- Part of the Siege of Tobruk, during the Second World War
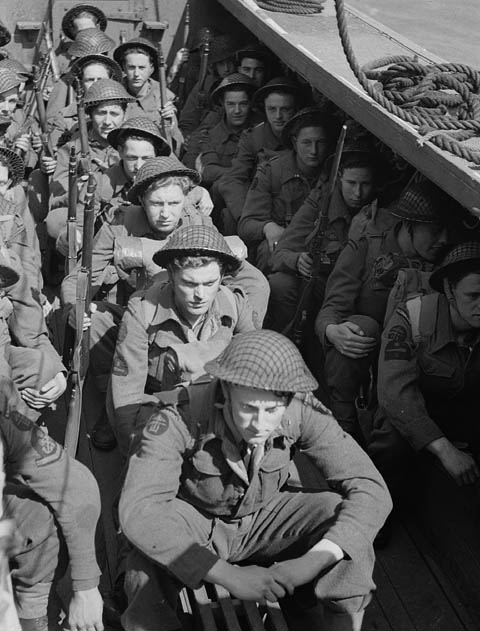
- British commandos in landing craft
Date	19/20 April 1941
Location	Bardia, Cyrenaica 31°46′N 25°06′E
Result	Allied victory

Belligerents
United Kingdom; Australia	Germany; Italy

Commanders and leaders
(United Kingdom) Lieutenant Colonel Colvin	(Nazi Germany) Erwin Rommel

Strength
A Battalion Layforce; RTR Troop; HMS Glengyle; HMS Coventry; HMAS Stuart; HMAS Voyager; HMAS Waterhen; HMS Triumph	

Casualties and losses
1 killed; 70 captured	1 artillery battery destroyed; 1 supply dump destroyed

The raid on Bardia was an amphibious landing at the coastal town of Bardia in North Africa by British Commandos over the night of 19/20 April 1941 during the Second World War. The raid was carried out by No. 7 Commando, also known as A Battalion Layforce, together with a small detachment from the Royal Tank Regiment; the raiders were supported by five navy ships and a submarine. The raid destroyed an Italian artillery battery and a supply dump. It was deemed a success despite the loss of 70 men captured and one killed. The more lasting strategic effect of the raid was the diversion of a German armoured brigade from the front line to provide rear area security.

== Background ==
In January 1941, an ad hoc force of 2,000 commandos, known as Layforce, was sent from Great Britain to take part in raiding operations in the Mediterranean. Under the command of Colonel Robert Laycock, the force comprised No. 7 Commando, No. 8 (Guards) Commando, No. 11 (Scottish) Commando, a troop from No. 3 Commando and the Folbot section. On their arrival in Egypt in March 1941, the force was strengthened by the amalgamated No. 50 Commando and No. 52 Commando. To disguise from the Axis powers that a large force of commandos had arrived in the theatre, 7, 8, 11 and 50/52 Commandos were camouflaged as A, B, C and D Battalions Layforce.

== Prelude ==
=== Unternehmen Sonnenblume ===
In early 1941, Operation Compass was a big British and Commonwealth victory against the Italian troops in Egypt and Cyrenaica, the eastern province of Libya. General Archibald Wavell ordered a large part of XIII Corps (Lieutenant-General Richard O'Connor) to Greece as part of Operation Lustre in the Battle of Greece. Adolf Hitler responded to the Italian disaster by ordering Unternehmen Sonnenblume (Operation Sunflower), the dispatchof the new Afrika Korps to North Africa as reinforcements for the Italians, to prevent their collapse. The Afrika Korps had fresh troops, better equipment and tanks and a charismatic commander, Erwin Rommel. When Rommel arrived in North Africa along with six Italian divisions, including the Trento and Ariete, his orders were to remain on the defensive.

In the first Italo-German offensive, the Axis force raided and quickly defeated the British at El Agheila on 24 March, exploited the success and by 15 April had pushed the British back to the Libyan–Egyptian border at Sollum and besieged Tobruk. Lieutenant-General Philip Neame, the new commander of XIII Corps (re-named HQ Cyrenaica Command after the transfers to Greece), O'Connor, and Major-General Michael Gambier-Parry, commander of the 2nd Armoured Division, were captured. The Western Desert Force HQ took over under Lieutenant-General Noel Beresford-Peirse, who was recalled from East Africa. An armoured brigade group of the 2nd Armoured Division had been used to provide forces for the Greek campaign and the rest of the division in Cyrenaica had lost most of its tanks to mechanical breakdowns and fuel shortage. Several Axis attempts to seize Tobruk failed and a front line was formed on the Egyptian border. In April 1941, the plans for the deployment of Layforce were changed; their first operation would be a raid on Bardia.

== Raid ==
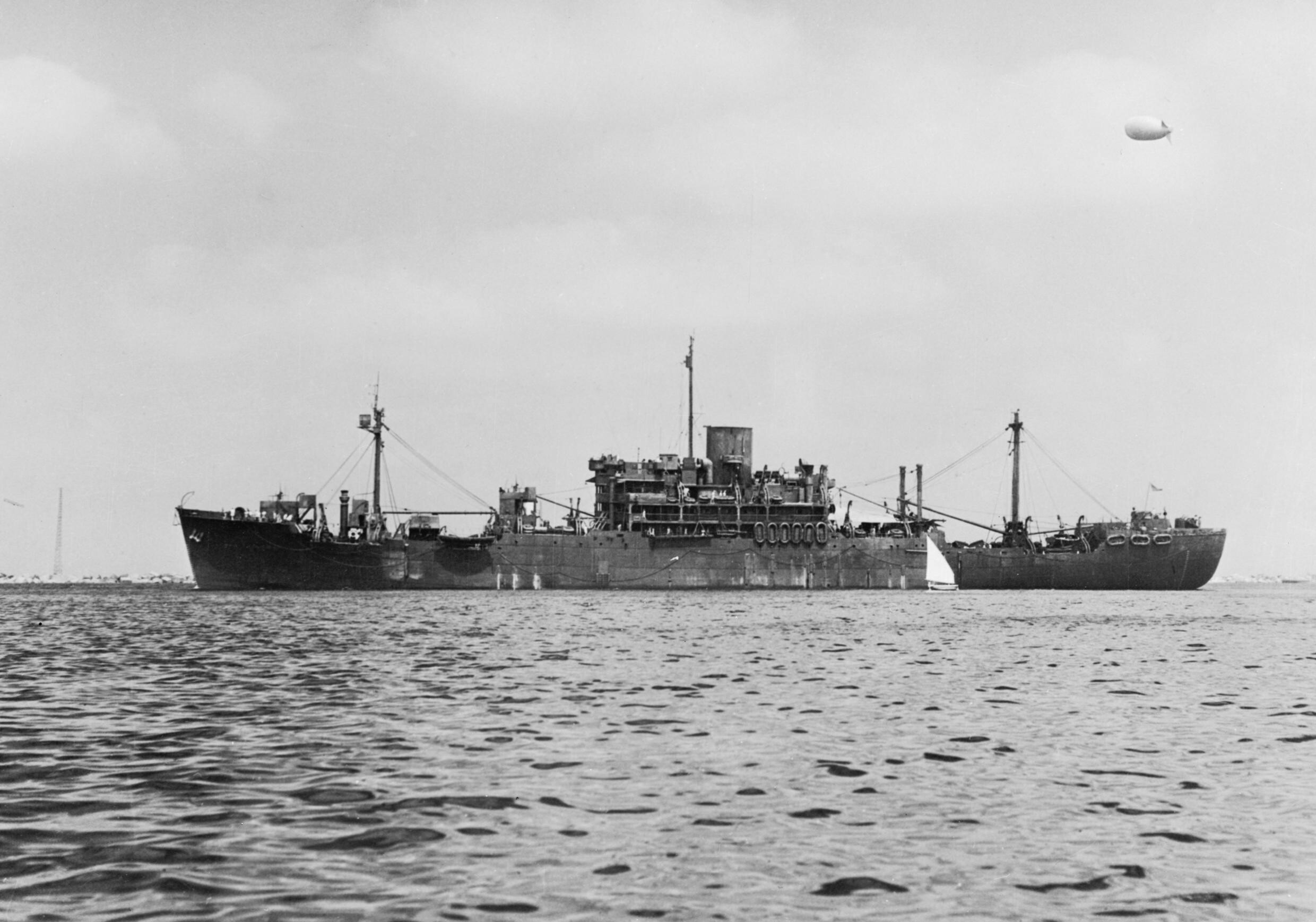
HMS Glengyle, an infantry assault ship

The Bardia raid was planned for the night of 19/20 April for A Battalion, Layforce to disrupt Axis lines of communication and inflict as much damage as possible to installations and equipment. The plan called for the simultaneous landing of A Battalion and a troop of tanks from the Royal Tank Regiment on four beaches by Landing Craft Assault (LCA). The landing force would be transported to the area by HMS Glengyle, escorted by the anti-aircraft cruiser HMS Coventry and the destroyers HMAS Stuart, Voyager and Waterhen. Off Bardia, one LCA could not be lowered and there were difficulties releasing the others. When they did get going and approached the beaches, they were expecting to see lights to guide them in, which were to have been set up by the Folbot section but the Folbot section had been delayed en route when friendly fire caused HMS Triumph, the submarine transporting them, to submerge and take evasive action.

The main landing force, running late, were landed on the wrong beaches. The landings were unopposed and the commandos made their way inland to destroy their objectives. Bardia was found to be empty of Italian or German forces and faulty intelligence resulted in some objectives being missed, as they were not where they were supposed to be or they did not exist. The commandos managed to destroy an Italian supply dump and an Italian coastal artillery battery before returning to their LCAs to re-embark. The raid would have passed without loss to the commandos but for the death of a commando officer by friendly fire from an over-alert commando and the capture of 70 men who, after getting lost, ended up on the wrong evacuation beach and became prisoners of war.

== Aftermath ==
=== Analysis ===
Despite the limited results and seventy captured and one killed, the raid on Bardia had considerable strategic effect. The Germans diverted the greater part of an armoured brigade from Sollum, where it was beginning to exert heavy pressure on the Western Desert Force and kept it for some time guarding rear areas. Layforce was less fortunate, being used as normal infantry, a role for which it was neither equipped nor trained. As one of the few reserve forces available, it was sent to take part in the Battle of Crete; fighting as the rearguard they lost 600 men before being evacuated. C Battalion was not sent to Crete but instead to Lebanon, where they lost over 120 men fighting in the battle of the Litani River. The steady drain of manpower without the replacement system of normal British Army battalions meant that Layforce was left in an ineffective state and was disbanded in July 1941.

=== Commemoration ===
The author Evelyn Waugh, who took part in the raid, related in an article he wrote for Life Magazine in November 1941, that the Germans "sent a strong detachment of tanks and armoured cars to repel the imagined invasion". In his diary published in 1976, a very different picture emerged of incompetence by the commandos, against virtually no opposition.

== See also ==
- List of British military equipment of World War II
- List of German military equipment of World War II
- List of Italian military equipment in World War II
