= Landing Craft Assault =

Landing craft used extensively in World War II

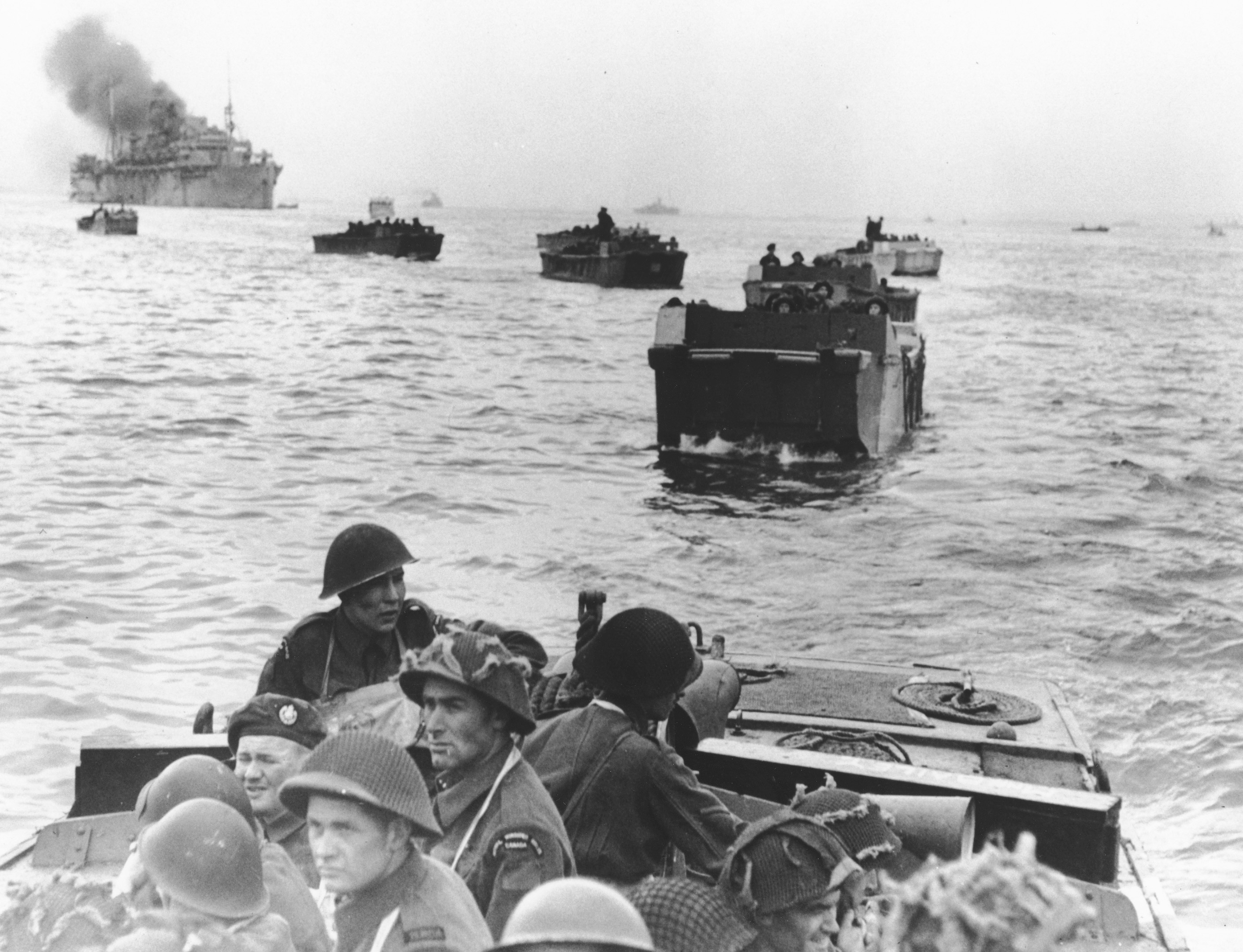
- LCAs form line ahead as they move off from the landing ship Llangibby Castle, carrying troops of the Winnipeg Rifles to Juno Beach, Normandy, June 6, 1944

Class overview
- Name: Assault landing craft
- Builders: John I. Thornycroft Ltd. and others
- Operators: Royal Navy; Royal Canadian Navy; Royal Indian Navy; Royal Netherlands Navy
- Preceded by: Various ship's boats and cutters
- Succeeded by: LCA (Large), Westland Whirlwind (helicopter)
- Built: 1939–1945
- Completed: ~2,000
- Active: 0
- Lost: 1939–1945: 371 (267 in 1944)

General characteristics
- Type: Landing craft
- Displacement: 9 long tons (9,144 kg)
- Length: 41 ft 6 in (12.65 m)
- Beam: 10 ft (3.0 m)
- Draught: Light: 1 ft 1 in (0.33 m) forward, 1 ft 9 in (0.53 m) aft; Loaded: 1 ft 9 in (0.53 m) fwd, 2 ft 3 in (0.69 m) aft
- Ramps: 1
- Propulsion: 2 × 65 hp Ford V-8 petrol
- Speed: 10 knots (19 km/h; 12 mph) (light); 6 knots (11 km/h; 6.9 mph) (loaded)
- Range: 50–80 miles
- Troops: 36 troops or 800 lb (363 kg) cargo
- Crew: Four: coxswain, two seamen and a stoker plus one officer per group of three boats
- Armament: 1 × Bren light machine gun; possibly 2 × Lewis Gun; 2 × 2-inch mortar fitted aft (later models)
- Armour: 10 lb. DIHT (.75 in (19 mm)) on bulkheads and sides; 7.8 lb. DIHT (.25 in (6.4 mm)) on decks above the troop well and engine space.

Landing Craft Assault (LCA) was a landing craft used extensively in World War II. Its primary purpose was to ferry troops from transport ships to attack enemy-held shores. The craft derived from a prototype designed by John I. Thornycroft Ltd. of Woolston, Hampshire, UK. During the war it was manufactured throughout the United Kingdom in places as various as small boatyards and furniture manufacturers.

Typically constructed of hardwood planking and selectively clad with armour plate, this shallow-draft, barge-like boat with a crew of four could ferry an infantry platoon of 31 and five additional specialist troops, to shore at 7 knots (13 km/h). Men generally entered the boat by walking over a gangplank from the boat deck of a troop transport as the LCA hung from its davits. When loaded, the LCA was lowered into the water. Soldiers exited by the boat's bow ramp.

The LCA was the most common British and Commonwealth landing craft of World War II. Prior to July 1942, these craft were referred to as "assault landing craft" (ALC), but "landing craft, assault" (LCA) was used thereafter to conform with the joint US-UK nomenclature system.

The LCA design's sturdy hull, load capacity, low silhouette, shallow draft, little bow wave, and silenced engines were all assets that benefited the occupants. The extent of its light armour, proof against rifle bullets and shell splinters with similar ballistic power recommended the LCA. Also, soldiers were able to sit, unlike other landing craft which required them to stand. Throughout the war in the Atlantic, the Mediterranean, and the Indian Ocean, the LCA was the most likely sea assault transport of British Commandos, United States Army Rangers, and other special forces.

== Origins ==
For centuries the Royal Navy had been landing soldiers on hostile shores, prominent examples being Quebec 1759, Peking 1900, during the Dardanelles campaign 1915-16 and the Zeebrugge Raid 1918. During the inter-war period, however, a combination of recent experience and economic stringency contributed to the delay in producing a modern infantry assault landing craft.

The costly failure of the Gallipoli campaign during World War I coupled with the emerging potential of airpower satisfied many in naval and military circles that the age of amphibious operations had come to a close. Still, throughout the 1920s and 1930s, animated discussion in Staff Colleges in Britain and the Indian Army Staff College, Quetta surrounded the strategic potential of the Dardanelles campaign compared with the strategic stalemate of the Western Front. The economic austerity of the worldwide economic depression and the government's adoption of the Ten Year Rule assured that such theoretical talk would not result in the procurement of any equipment.

The Munich Agreement of 1938 delayed the inevitable war between Britain and Germany. Munich also led to many changes in Imperial General Staff policies, among which was the acceptance of a proposal in November from the Inter-Service Training and Development Centre (ISTDC) at Fort Cumberland for amphibious assault procedures and for a new type of landing craft. Up to this time the Landing Craft Committee had produced some Motor Landing Craft but had not formed procedures for the assault role of these boats. Now there were specifications for what the new boat must be able to do. It must weigh less than ten long tons, enabling lifting by passenger liner davits. The new craft also had to be built around the load - apart from crew it should carry the thirty-one men of a British Army platoon and five assault engineers or signallers – and be so shallow drafted as to be able to land them, wet only up to their knees, in eighteen inches of water. The troops had to unload quickly. All of these specifications made the LCA personnel carriers; a separate set of requirements were laid down for a vehicle and supplies carrier, although previously the two roles were combined in the Motor Landing Craft.

When the ISTDC approached the Director of Naval Construction (DNC) at the Admiralty to design a craft to these specifications the DNC staff were urgently engaged in designing new ships to serve more immediate priorities. Germany's coastline was small and the army would be able to engage the enemy through France. Any urgent need for landing craft was not apparent and ISTDC were told it would take seven months to design what was required. The Board of Trade was therefore approached and asked to suggest a maritime architect. Mr. Fleming of Liverpool was proposed who soon came down to Fort Cumberland and the design of the first LCA began.

Following many visits with new drawings and proposals, a plan was ready by November 1938. Approval was sought from the DNC to build a prototype Fleming LCA. A wooden mock-up of the craft had been built in the model shed in Portsmouth dockyard. Fully equipped troops had practiced embarking and disembarking from it, and the design was altered to meet the practical difficulties discovered. The craft to be put into service was to be built of Birmabright, an aluminium alloy.

A meeting with the DNC was convened to discuss the results. The Fleming craft had few friends in the DNC, though their criticisms were not specific. They introduced representatives of three shipbuilding firms. The ISTDC were only interested in the Fleming design submitted already, and in trying the craft at a landing on the east coast of England in a matter of months. The DNC accepted this, but asked ISTDC to give their specifications to the firms present so that they could also submit designs. Two of the firms were unable to tender, the third, Messrs Thornycroft, had a proposal on the drawing board in forty-eight hours and ISTDC and the DNC agreed that construction of a prototype should be paid for. The craft might be constructed for experimental purposes on the understanding that the DNC held no responsibility.

J. S. White of Cowes built a prototype to the Fleming design. Eight weeks later the craft was doing trials on the Clyde. The craft behaved admirably, though it tended to bury its nose in the sea at full throttle. Noise from the two 120 hp Chrysler engines was excessive, being amplified by the metal hull. Also, there remained the difficulty of applying armour plate to the hull. The sides were not flat, but rounded – a complicated shape for which to roll an armoured skin. The Birmabright alloy used also presented chemical and physical obstacles for the application of hardened steel plates.

The Thornycroft design was being built at the same time with a hull of mahogany, the internal arrangements for the troops and exit being generally similar to the mock-up that had been built in Portsmouth Dockyard. The power plant of two 65 hp Ford V8 engines would be much quieter.

The Fleming won competitive trials at Langstone Harbour. Compared to the Thornycroft, the Fleming was superior in many areas. Troops disembarked in a quarter of the time. The silhouette and bow wave were smaller, qualities typically beneficial for surprise landings. However, the Fleming remained noisy. During trials on a misty morning the noisy approaching craft frightened civilians along the shore; tactical surprise was impossible.

Afterwards, Thornycroft produced a prototype to a revised design based on a double-diagonal mahogany hull. The silhouette and bow wave were small, and the twin engines could be made silent beyond 25 yards. Armour could replace the outer mahogany planking. Beaching qualities were satisfactory, something retained by the LCA. There was a lowerable ramp, but disembarkation speed remained unsatisfactory due to the narrowness. The revised Thornycroft became the basis for the LCA. DNC and Thornycroft collaborated to develop the design further, leading to a third prototype, ALC No 2.

== Design ==
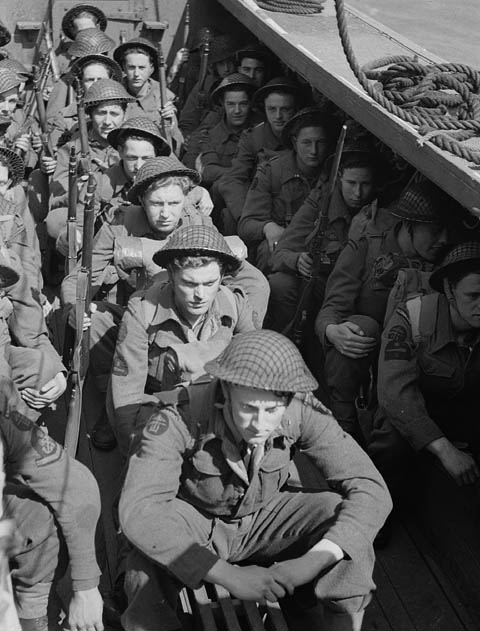
Royal Navy Beach Commandos aboard a Landing Craft Assault of the 529th Flotilla, Royal Navy

All landing craft designs (and landing ship designs for ships intended to beach) must find a compromise between two divergent priorities; the qualities that make a good sea boat are opposite those that make a craft suitable for beaching. The LCA keel was produced from Canadian rock elm which was treated with steam to make it pliable and then shaped using a keel block and wedges. Twenty-four mahogany transverse frame pieces were joined to the keel providing the overall structure. The craft had a hull built of double-diagonal mahogany planking. The sides were plated with "10lb. DIHT" armour, a heat treated steel based on D1 steel, in this case Hadfield's Resista ¼". Steps were taken to ensure that the boat would not sink when swamped. In the bow section between the armoured doors and the ramp, each bulkhead was packed with 30 cubic feet (850 L) of Onazote (a type of vulcanised foam rubber) buoyant material. The same Onazote packing was placed along both hull sides for the length of the well, and 42.5 cubic feet (1.20 m^{3}) filled the aft compartment.

The LCA had a long central well section fitted with three benches, one centre, one each port and starboard, for seating troops. The side benches were covered by the top deck. The well was divided from the bow by a bulkhead fitted with two vertically hinged doors. This pair of forward-opening armour-plate doors led to the ramp, which was lowered and raised by a simple arrangement of pulleys and wire. Two rollers on the leading outboard edge providing some freedom of movement for the ramp when it was grounded. Over this ramp troops could come ashore in two to three minutes, or less if the soldiers and crews were well trained. Immediately behind the bulkhead were the steering shelter on the starboard, and the Lewis gun shelter on the port. (Note: Shelters are referred to as cockpits in the 1944 US Navy pamphlet "Allied Landing Craft and Ships".) The steering shelter was fitted with a telegraph and voice pipe for communication with the stoker, a featherspray control lever, and a fold-up seat. The shelter was protected on all four sides by non-magnetic bulletproof plate surmounted by a hinged double-door roof. Most LCAs were fitted with a compass.

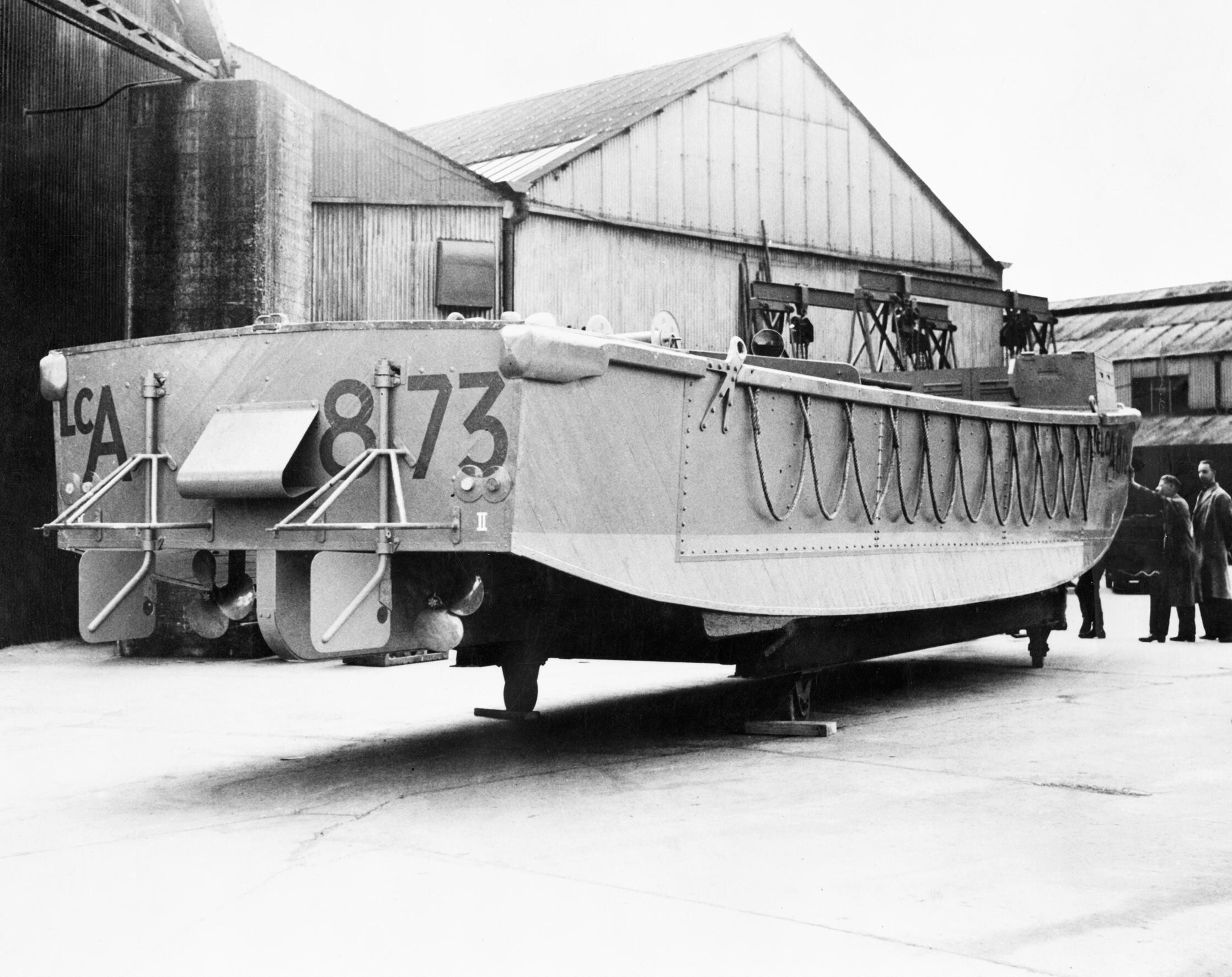
A newly completed LCA (assault landing craft) ready for launching, 1942.

Drive was by two shafts from the pair of Ford V8 engines to two 19 inch x 14 inch 2-bladed propellers. Fuel capacity was 64 imperial gallons (290 L). The craft were steered by twin rudders with steering wires that ran from the coxswain's shelter aft through the well and engine compartment, and the last three foot (unarmoured) buoyancy section in the stern. The LCA propulsion system was designed to be quiet. At low speeds the engines could not be heard at 25 yards. The LCA handled well enough in moderate seas when waves were 3 to 5 ft (0.91 to 1.52 m) but could make no speed against rough weather, demonstrated in the number of LCA-hulled support craft that foundered in 6 ft (1.8 m) waves while on tow to Normandy (specifically LCA(HR)). The power-plant, while quiet, has been criticized for being underpowered. Nevertheless, the bow lines and small ramp made the LCA a reasonably good sea boat.

=== Variants ===
From the start, the Inter-Service Training and Development Centre intended to use armed versions of the LCA to provide close support to the troop-carrying types. These variants were armed with heavy machine guns and smoke-firing mortars. The two prototype LCA from 1938 were converted for this purpose, and other, similar, conversions became the Mkl LCS(M). The Mk1 had a centrally located armoured steering shelter just fore of the engine compartment, and was armed with two .50 inch machine guns, two .303 Lewis guns, and one 4-inch mortar or 20mm gun. The crew of 11 included one officer, three ratings to sail, and seven gun crew. The Mk2 was similarly armed on a standard LCA hull, except the two machine guns were in a twin turret rather than single mounts. These craft were not expected to beach and later in production boats were given a proper bow, making them more seaworthy. Thus the LCS(M)(3) was produced and stayed in production for the rest of the war. The LCS(M)(3) used Scripps marine conversions of the Ford V8 engine and had 98 gal. fuel tanks. The power-operated turret was armed with twin .50 inch Vickers machine guns.

The LCA(HR) ('Hedgerow') was another support weapon variant. The troop well was filled by a Hedgehog spigot mortar weapon. The additional weight of this weapon and the force it placed on the craft when fired required strengthening of the well floor. This was the same Hedgehog used in anti-submarine warfare with the addition of impact fuse extensions in the projectile nose to detonate the warheads above ground - it fired 24 bombs arranged in four rows of six, each bomb containing about 30 lb (14 kg) of explosive. When fired successfully the bomb pattern was a 100-yard circle about 250 yards forward. The bombs would clear paths through mines and wire on the beach. Using this principle of 'counter-mining' - the explosions from mortar rounds setting off the mines both above and below the water's edge, proved very successful. They were used at Salerno and Normandy. Later in the war, the US built a similar craft the "Woofus" based on the LCM.

One experiment was mounting a "flying hose" on an LCA as a mine-clearing line charge device for clearing mines and obstacles on beaches. The LCA was fitted with a coil of hose, attached to a rocket. The rocket would carry the hose onto the beach, the crew would pump nitroglycerine into the hose, and then attach an explosive charge to the near end and throw it overboard. Fortunately, this system was never used operationally. The same concept was employed by the 79th Armoured Division (called "Congers"), using Universal Carriers. The nitroglycerin supply for the unit using them accidentally ignited - causing great damage and loss of life.

While not, perhaps, a variant, a field modification was developed by US Rangers with assistance from LCA crews and Commandos, for the famous Pointe du Hoc assault of 6 June 1944. Each of the 10 LCAs of Flotillas 510 and 522 which carried the 2nd Ranger Battalion to Pointe du Hoc was fitted with 3 pairs of rocket tubes, firing six-tine grapnels. These pulled up (by pairs) ¾" plain ropes, toggle ropes, and rope ladders. The ropes and ladders were stowed in three large tackle boxes mounted down either side of the LCA decks and the rocket tubes were positioned down either side behind the corresponding boxes. In addition, each craft carried a pair of small hand-projector-type rockets, which could be easily carried ashore and fired small 100 ft ropes. These could carry to full extension provided the line was dry and used in moderate weather conditions. Each craft also carried tubular-steel extension ladders made up of light, four-foot sections suitable for quick assembly. These modified craft had the central bench in the well removed. At least some of the LCAs also had smoke floats on the stern and the armament in the gunner's shelter was a Lewis gun, but a variety of Brens and other light weapons were also carried.

Additional support craft variants included the LCA (OC), which was fitted to clear foreshore obstructions. Neither the LCA (FT) fitted with a flamethrower, nor the LCA (CDL) appears to have been used in action. The latter was a conversion by the parent firm of Thornycroft to carry an armoured searchlight (Canal Defence Light) originally developed for use in tanks and intended to blind the enemy or create 'Artificial Moonlight' in a night attack. Though plans exist of a prototype conversion it is not clear whether it was ever completed. There was an LCA (Bakery) variant to provide fresh bread.

== Production and development history ==
With few exceptions, the hull, ramp, and power plant of the LCA remained the same throughout the war. Early on the coxswain's position was moved from aft to forward on the starboard side. Other particulars could vary greatly; some LCAs having Direction finding antenna loops, others Danforth anchors on vertical racks forward. The hatch layout on the stern deck varied, as did the placement and type of mooring bits, chocks, cleats, fairleads, and fuel caps. Photographic evidence shows all these variations and also differences in the placement of the lifelines that were looped along either hullside for men in the water.

The Admiralty ordered 18 LCAs from Messrs. Thornycroft in April 1939. These early boats weighed more than 9 tons and had flush-decked hulls, an armoured bulkhead forward that wrapped around the steering compartment on the starboard side. The steering compartment's armour plates stood about two feet proud of the deck line. In September, 8 more were ordered. Ford V8 marine conversions by Thornycroft powered the early groups of LCAs, these water-cooled petrol engines developing 65 hp each when driving the 19"x14" 2-bladed propellers through a 41:20 gear reduction. The twin propulsion units gave a speed of 10½ knots at 2,800 revolutions per minute with a load of 8,300 lb (3,800 kg) in the boat. Later craft used propellers with three blades.

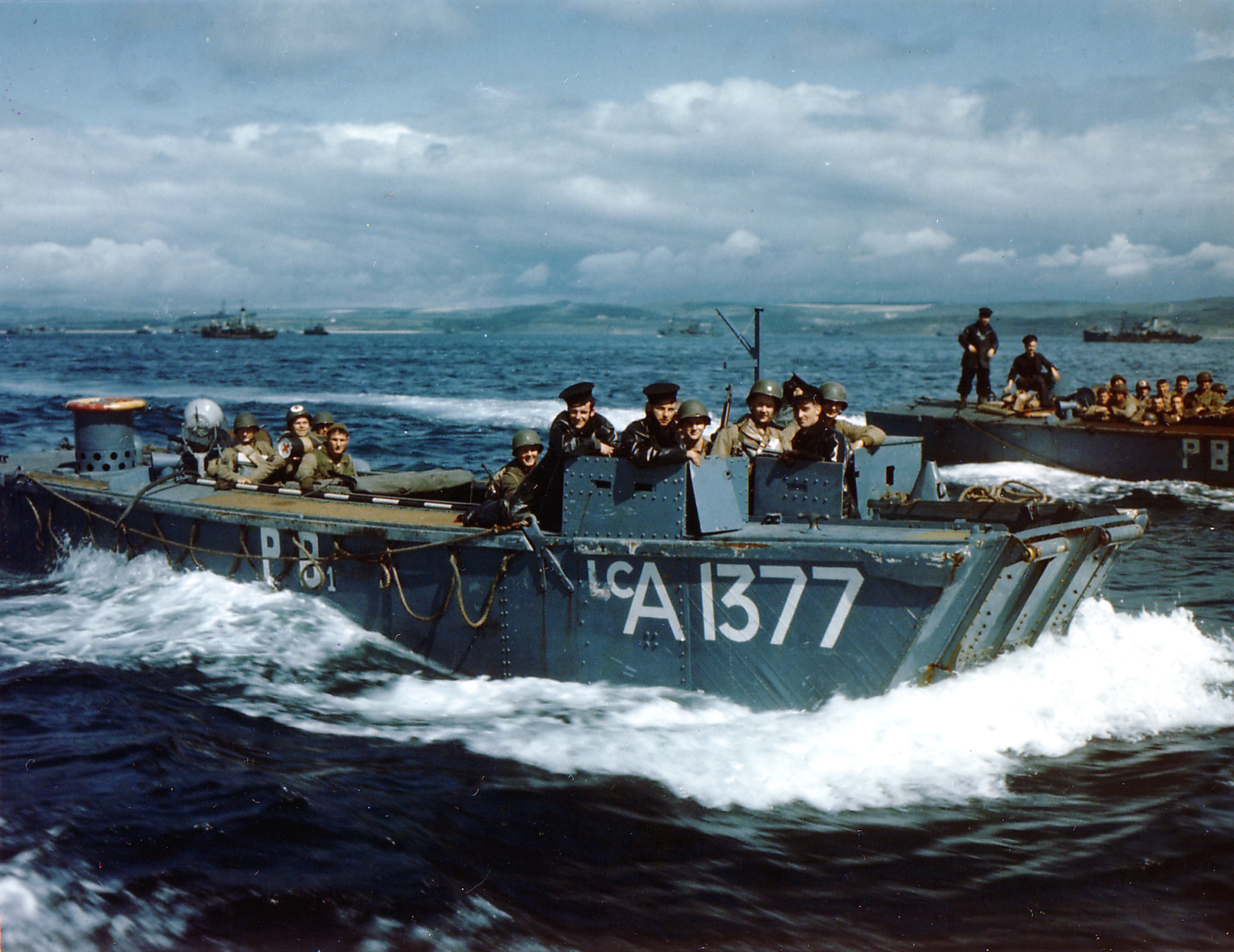
Royal Navy Landing Craft LCA-1377 carries American troops to a ship in a British port, during preparations for the Normandy invasion, circa May–June 1944.

The Admiralty placed orders for 30 LCAs in March 1940. By this time, Thornycroft were subcontracting with South Coast yacht-builders to fill the Admiralty's many small boat orders as Thornycroft yards were overtaxed building war-emergency convoy escorts and the like. Some LCAs - Numbers 24-29 and 51 - were fitted with Parsons conversions of the Ford V8, driving propellers similar to the standard type but on a 2:1 gear reduction; these LCAs did 12 knots (22 km/h) at 3,300 revolutions. The standard engine fitted in almost all other craft was the Scripps conversion of the Ford V8. Official trial results for craft built in 1940–1 with this engine show a consistent performance with an unladen speed of 11 knots (20 km/h) at 2,800 revolutions. June saw 64 more LCA orders, and then between late September and March 1941 another 104. These early craft did not yet have the later standard portside armoured Lewis gun position, but nevertheless, had framed canvas hold covers, scaling ladders mounted on the decks amidships, and various other refinements dropped when mass production got into full swing. The finish and performance of these early LCAs were quite fine, which might be expected as these boats were built in established Thornycroft selected yards, but in circumstances of nightly blackouts, air raids, wartime restrictions, and shortages the LCA building programme was a remarkable achievement.

About April 1941 the Admiralty decided not to place orders exclusively through Thornycroft and leaving them to sub-contract, rather, the Admiralty placed orders directly with cabinet makers, carpenters, and yacht-builders in all parts of Britain. After February 1942, LCAs began being manufactured with deck armour in addition to their vertical armour. In the 42 months prior to the end of 1944 Britain was able to produce an additional 1,694 LCAs. Certain details were modified as production ran, but the basic LCA design remained unchanged for the length of the war. By the time production was in full tilt in preparation for Operation Overlord production rose to sixty LCAs a month.

Sources differ regarding the speed and endurance of the LCA. By 1945 the all-up loaded weight of an LCA had risen to 13½ tons, due to the addition of further armour and the weight of weaponry an infantry platoon expected to carry into battle. As with all wooden vessels after prolonged immersion, weight increased in the LCA and performance consequently fell. The equipment had evolved and so had the personnel. The time of needing a few craft for raiding was past and the time for invasion, for scores of flotillas dawned. Another obstacle to getting the best performance out of the LCA was the early war tendency to return ratings to their various barracks who had landing craft and small marine engine training. Unfortunately, the Navy appointed these ratings to duties without regard to the importance of their amphibious skills. In June 1941 this pattern was changed with the establishment of the Combined Operations naval base HMS Quebec at Inveraray. Combined Operations was then able to keep trained landing craft crew until boats became available.

== Crew and flotilla structure ==
Early in the war the arrangements for manning LCAs and structure of LCA units was governed by the expediency of the moment; nevertheless, by mid-war permanent crews and larger formation plans could be kept.

=== Manning the LCA ===
In Royal Navy service LCAs were normally crewed by hostilities-only ratings, personnel of the Royal Naval Patrol Service, and officers and ratings of the Royal Navy Volunteer Reserve (RNVR). Approximately 43,500 hostilities-only and 5,500 RNVR officers and ratings crewed the various landing craft types in 1944. Of these, the Royal Canadian Navy provided 60 officers and 300 ratings, on the condition that they be formed into specifically Canadian companies.

In July 1943 Royal Marines from the Mobile Naval Bases Defence Organization and other shore units were drafted into the pool to crew the expanding numbers of landing craft being gathered in England for the Normandy invasion. By 1944, 500 Royal Marine officers and 12,500 Marines had become landing craft crew. By 1945, personnel priorities had changed once more. Marines of landing craft flotillas were formed into two infantry brigades to address the manpower shortage in ending the war in Germany.

In Royal Indian Navy (RIN) service, crewing LCAs followed somewhat similar lines. By mid-1941 members of the RIN Reserve and RIN Volunteer Reserve were being trained to operate LCA. In 1942, the RIN began receiving four battalions of Indian army troops to provide crews for landing craft. Seven hundred soldiers of the 9/1st Punjab Regiment volunteered for such a transfer in February 1943. The 15/13th Frontier Force Rifles Regiment voted similarly. These battalions were transferred despite the fact that few of the men had ever seen the sea. Their training suffered severely from lack of landing craft, spares, and trained instructors. From around mid-1943 there was also a Burma Royal Naval Volunteer Reserve in existence working closely among LCA and LCS crews. By 1945, the BRNVR seems to have been formed into the 59th Motor Launch Flotilla. In all likelihood, it had been put together at least partly from those with maritime experience escaping from the 1942 Japanese onslaught in Burma.

A junior naval or Royal Marine officer commanded three LCAs and was carried aboard one of the craft. The officer relayed signals and orders to the other two craft in the group by signal flags in the earlier part of the war, but by 1944 many of the boats had been fitted with two-way radios. On the wave leader's boat the Sternsheetsman was normally employed as the Signalman but flags, Aldis lamps, and loudhailers were sometimes more reliable than 1940s radio equipment. The communications equipment of the troops being ferried could sometimes prove helpful.

=== LCA crew ===
The LCA's crew of four ratings included a Sternsheetsman, whose action station was at the stern to assist in lowering and raising the boat at the davits of the Landing Ship Infantry (LSI), a Bowman-gunner, whose action station was at the front of the boat to open and close the armoured doors, raise and lower the ramp, and operate the one or two Lewis guns in the armoured gun shelter opposite the steering position, a stoker-mechanic responsible for the engine compartment, and a Coxswain who sat in the armoured steering shelter forward on the starboard side. Though in control of the rudders, the coxswain did not have direct control of the engines and gave instructions to the stoker through voicepipe and telegraph. The craft relayed signals and orders to the other two craft in the group by signal flags in the earlier part of the war, but by 1944 many of the boats had been fitted with two-way radios. The sternsheetsman and bowman were to be available to take over from the coxswain or stoker should they be killed or injured. On longer journeys they might relieve them to rest. They also manned any additional machine guns and operated the kedge anchor, if it was required. In mine fields and among anti-invasion obstacles and rocks seaman would sit on the bow or stern or move about the sides of his boat piloting or preventing it from hitting the obstacles.

=== Flotilla size ===
Normally, a flotilla comprised 12 boats at full complement, though this number was not rigid. The flotilla's size could alter to fit operational requirements or the hoisting capacity of a particular LSI. An infantry company would be carried in six LCAs. A flotilla was normally assigned to an LSI. These varied in capacity with smaller ones, such as the 3,975+ ton HMCS Prince David able to hoist 6 LCAs, and larger ones, such as the nearly 16,000 ton HMS Glengyle with room for 13 LCAs.

=== From ship to shore ===
Throughout World War II, LCAs travelled under their own power, towed by larger craft, or on the davits of LSIs or Landing Ship, Tank (LSTs).

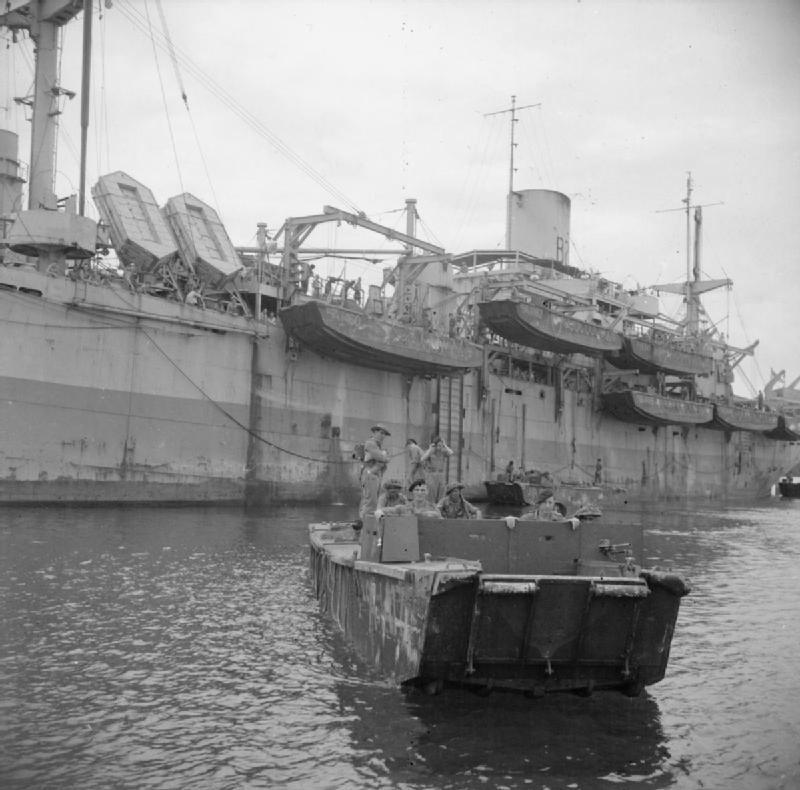
An LCA leaving the LSI HMS Rocksand for the island of Nancowry, on the Nicobar Islands, October 1945. Other LCAs are suspended on davits waiting to be loaded before being lowered.

In larger operations such as Jubilee, Torch, Husky, and Overlord, LCAs were carried to invasion areas by Landing Ship Infantry (LSI). The location chosen for the LSI to stop and lower the LCA was a designated point inside the 'Transport Area' when the LSI was operating with a US Navy Task Force, or the 'Lowering Position' when with a Royal Navy Task Force. The transport area or lowering position was approximately 6–11 miles off shore (11 miles was amphibious doctrine for the USN by mid-war, while the RN tended to accept the risks associated with drawing nearer shore). Normally landing ships were fitted with heavy-duty power-operated davits. Early landing ships were fitted with Welin-McLachlin davits – these being generally in use in the Merchant Navy for standard 99 man lifeboats. As the weight of LCAs increased through the war (eventually approaching 14 tons) heavier davits were required. Later LSIs and those being refitted were provisioned with luffing davits of a crossbeam type. The davits themselves provided a demarcation between the responsibilities of the LSI crew (either Royal Navy or Merchant Navy) and the members of the LCA Flotilla.

The LCAs were swung down to the level of the loading decks and the crews climbed aboard. At this time the troops were assembled by platoons ready to cross gangways. When the coxswain gave the platoon commander the word, he took his men over and into the stern of the LCA and they filed forward. The platoon divided into three lines, one for each section of the platoon, the outboard two sections sitting under the protection of the troop well's armoured decks, the centre section crouched on the low seating bench down the middle. Despite the wires holding the craft to a fender, the LCA rolled with the motion of the ship. The coxswain would then call, 'Boat manned,' to the telephone operator at the loading station, who, in turn, reported to the 'LC' Control Room. The coxswain would then warn the troops to mind the pulleys at the ends of falls fore and aft, which could wave freely about when the craft had been set in the water. The task of hooking on and casting off from the ship required skill and seamanship from the coxswain, bowman, and sternsheetsman. The snatch blocks used were heavy steel and difficult to handle. The bowman and sternsheetsman stood by his respective block, as the craft was lowered into the water. At a time when there was sufficient slack in the falls both had to cast off at the same instant, and the blocks had to be released while there was slack in the falls. If the boat was not freed at both ends at once the rise and fall of the sea could cause the boat to tip, swamp, and perhaps capsize with loss of life. Casting-off was done in all sorts of sea conditions, and the sea might be rising and falling a metre or more (6' swells were not uncommon on D-Day). A combination of skill and luck could redeem a failure to cast-off, nevertheless. On D-Day, an LCA of Royal Marine 535 Flotilla, LSI Glenearn, released all but its after falls, which were jammed, and the craft tilted alarmingly to 45 degrees. The coxswain kept his head, calming the passengers, while seamen worked to free the falls. Once free, the coxswain needed to get the LCA away to prevent colliding with the towering side of the LSI as it rose and fell with the swells.

Commonly, the LCAs of a flotilla would form line-ahead behind a motor launch or Motor Torpedo Boat (MTB) that would guide them to their designated beach (it was not normal for LCAs to circle the landing ship as was USN and US Coast Guard practice). As the LCA approached the beach they would form line abreast for the final run-in to the beach. When the front of the LCA came to ground on the beach it was called the 'touch down.'

== Service history ==
Throughout the Second World War, LCAs were used for landing Allied forces in almost every Commando operation, major and minor, in the European theatre. They also saw service in North Africa and the Indian Ocean. They saw a little service in the Pacific close to the end of the war. Below are operations involving LCA and LCA variants, and descriptions of how the attributes of the craft, good or ill, suited operational circumstances.

=== 1940 ===
==== The Norwegian campaign ====
The first four LCAs used in an opposed landing disembarked 120 French Foreign Legionnaires of the 13th Demi-Brigade (13e DBLE) on the beach at Bjerkvik, 8 miles (13 km) north of Narvik, on 13 May during the Norwegian Campaign. The army commander, General Antoine Béthouart, responsible for capturing the area north of Rombaks, realized that a landing behind German lines in the Herjangsfjord was required to force the enemy to retire. To assure that plans he made with the Royal Navy were understood by the Legionnaires, a meeting took place aboard HMS Effingham. The plan agreed involved the LCAs making the twenty-mile (32 km) approach journey under their own power, a pre-landing bombardment by ships, followed by the landing of three tanks - one from a new LCM (Mk. I), and two from the older Motor Landing Craft (MLC), then the landing of an initial wave of infantry from LCAs, and then a follow on force carried in barges towed by motor torpedo boats. On 12 May, at about 23:40, Royal Navy destroyers commenced a bombardment of the town intended to destroy all buildings on the foreshore. The LCAs landed soon after 01:00, when the LCM (Mk. I) had delivered a tank to the beach (the other tanks in MLCs were delayed). The LCA crews manoeuvered their craft to the left of the village of Bjerkvik, the intended landing place, and under a slight rise in the ground in order to spare the soldiers casualties from opposing machine gun fire. Though touchdown was in the early hours of the new day the midnight sun illuminated the battle. Once ashore, the 13e DBLE's companies deployed and moved to seize the high ground to the north and south of the town. This debut of the new LCA was seen, from a distance, by Admiral L. E. H. Maund, who had done much work in its development:

We could see the dark forms, like so many ants, after their five hours in the L.C.A., run out of their craft, open out and, without a moment's pause, advance across and over the knoll that covered the village from the west. They disappeared and later could be seen crossing behind the village on to the Gratangen road to follow the first tank on its way to the north and so take from the rear that was holding up the advance of the Chasseurs from Gratangen.

The LCAs, along with towed ship's boats and other landing craft types, then turned to landing the rest of 13e DBLE and its supporting elements.

Maund was most pleased with the efficiency with which the Legionnaires disembarked from the LCA. The small flotilla of LCAs, MLCs, and an LCM (Mk. I) had added greatly to the Allies' tactical latitude. No LCAs were lost to enemy action during these operations in Norway. One craft was lost, sometime before 27 May, being burned out by accident while lying up on the east shore of the Herjangsfjord. The three LCAs surviving could not be hoisted on available ships when the decision was made to evacuate. An attempt was made to tow them home behind trawlers, but the sea became too rough and the LCAs had to be cut adrift and sunk.

==== Dunkirk ====
More than a dozen LCAs were used in evacuating the BEF from Dunkirk (Operation Dynamo). Eight LCAs were sent to Dunkirk on a merchant ship, SS Clan MacAlister. Designed to be hoisted on the standard passenger liner davits used for the 99 man lifeboats, the LCA could be carried and launched from a large number of Merchant Navy vessels. Clan MacAlister began hoisting out LCAs upon arriving off Dunkirk, 29 May, but was attacked and sunk before releasing half the craft. Five LCAs were lost with Clan MacAlister. The remaining eight began taking soldiers off the beaches at La Panne and Dunkirk. One became stranded on the beach and was set afire by its crew. The balance returned to England "in a bad way" after taking some 2,000 soldiers directly off the beaches.

=== 1941 ===
Though the LCA had been designed around the most common likely load, a British infantry platoon, the original war establishment of a commando (a headquarters and 10 troops) was formed without reference to this fact. Early in 1941, each Commando unit's establishment was changed to consist of a Headquarters and six troops. Each troop would comprise three officers and 62 other ranks; this number was set so each troop would fit into two LCA.

==== Norway ====
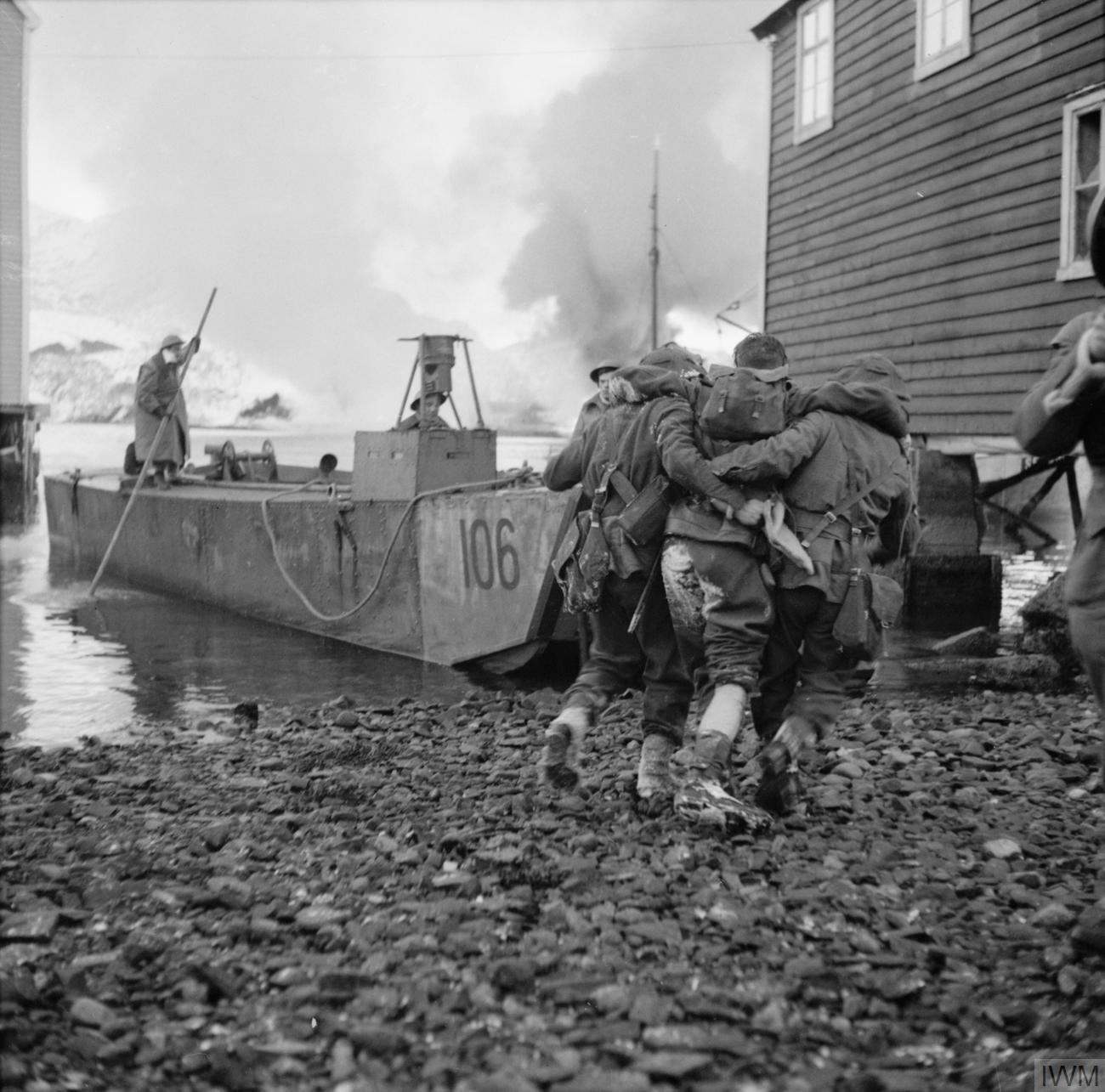
During Archery a wounded Commando is brought to a LCA. In the steering shelter, the coxswain appears to be keeping the craft nosed onto the beach by keeping the engines gently ahead while a seaman is preventing the craft from broaching to with a quant pole.

In March, LCAs carried the first British Commando raid of the war, directed at Norway. Operation Claymore was conducted by men of No. 3 and No. 4 Commandos. The landing force were to destroy the fish oil producing facilities in the ports of Stamsund, Hennmgsvaer, Svolvaer, and Brettesnes. The six LCAs and 2 LCM(1)s of the newly converted Landing Ship Infantry HMS Queen Emma carried men of 4 Commando, as well as Royal Engineer demolition experts and a contingent of men from the Royal Norwegian Navy in a raid on the Lofoten Islands. HMS Princess Beatrix, also new and with a similar flotilla of landing craft, landed No. 3 Commando. The two LSIs, in company with five destroyers, entered the Vestfjorden before 04:00 on 4 March, and launched their attack. The morning weather was clear, cold, and calm, and the landing craft approached all four landing points more or less simultaneously in broad daylight (sunrise was approximately 06:20). The LCAs were crowded with raiders; one craft ferrying 41 officers and men in addition to the four man crew. The occasional ice-cold wave would lop over the side to brace the passengers. Surprise was complete and there was little resistance. Though the LCA crews had been told to expect "gently shelving beach", the quay at the landing was quite high, and local civilians had gathered to tie up the landing craft and assist the troops in climbing the quay. All targets selected were located and destroyed. The troops were embarked by 13:00 and within half an hour the British had left. After returning, the LCA flotilla from Queen Emma was used for a time in Combined Operations training in Scotland.

In December there were two raids. The first was Operation Anklet, a raid on the Lofoten Islands by No. 12 Commando on 26 December. The German garrison was in the midst of their Christmas celebrations and was easily overcome; the Commandos re-embarked after two days. Operation Archery was a larger raid at Vågsøy Island. This raid involved men from Nos. 2, 3, 4 and 6 Commandos, a Royal Navy flotilla, and limited air support. The raid caused significant damage to factories, warehouses, and the German garrison, and sank eight ships. After this the Germans increased the garrison in Norway by an extra 30,000 troops, upgraded coastal and inland defences, and sent a number of capital ships to the area.

==== Mediterranean ====
In the Mediterranean, LCAs from HMS Glengyle carried No. 7 Commando (designated A battalion Layforce, 6th Infantry Division at the time) in their raid on Bardia in April. The objective was to silence a coastal defence battery atop 300 ft high cliffs on a rocky coast. Here the sturdy hull of the LCA, coupled with the skill of the crews allowed many of the Commandos to land almost dry-shod.

Later that month, following the successful German intervention, LCAs were involved in the evacuation of Greece, where in hastily organized operations some 50,000 troops were embarked from ports including Porto Rafti, Argos, and Kalamata.

In May LCAs ferried many of these troops to Crete, and days later, LCAs from Glengyle and HMT Cameronia evacuated 6,000 Argyll and Sutherland Highlanders during the evacuation of Crete.

=== 1942 ===
Operation Biting, between 27–28 February (also known as the Bruneval Raid), targeted a German coastal radar installation atop 300-foot (91 m) cliffs. The raiding party itself was dropped by parachute at night and following the raid was taken back to England by sea. The naval force under Commander F. N. Cook, Royal Australian Navy, departed earlier, during the afternoon of the 27th, for the journey across the Channel. Motor Gun Boats (MGBs) towed LCAs across the Channel (LCA crews manned their craft during such tows) and carried detachments from No. 12 Commando who would provide fire support for the raiding party when they reached the evacuation beach. To accomplish this task each LCA had sandbags laid down its decks as parapets for Boys anti-tank rifles and Bren guns fitted with high volume drum magazines. When close to the coast the commandos climbed into the LCAs, the crews cast off, and the craft made for the beach under their own power. Meanwhile, on land, having accomplished their objectives the airborne raiders withdrew through a gully in the cliffs to the evacuation beach. By this time, it was 02:15, (Note: 24-hour clock notation.) a sea mist prevented the naval force from seeing paratrooper's signals to evacuate them. The raiders fired off an emergency Very light seen by three LCA crews who soon approached accompanied by three MGBs. The original plan for the operation had called for two LCAs to land on the beach at a time, but this had never been satisfactorily achieved during the training manoeuvres. Instead, as the other three LCAs caught up, all six landed at the same time. One, LCA 125, dropped its kedge anchor just prior to beaching, but the anchor line played out and ran off the drum. Troops in the landing craft opened fire on German troops gathering by the top of the cliff. With all the craft beached at once, and enemy fire causing considerable confusion on the beach, some LCAs left over-crowded, whilst others left half-empty. The coxswain of LCA 125 was able to reverse his engines quickly and prevent the craft from being stranded. The entire raiding force was taken off the beach and soon transferred to MGBs for more comfortable transport back to England. Communications had failed; the naval force had received no signals apart from the Very light, and had spent much of the time hiding from a German naval patrol that had nearly discovered them. The journey back to Britain was uneventful, with the MGBs, LCAs in tow, being escorted by four destroyers and a flight of Spitfires. This raid with its dramatic embarkation from the base of a cliff occupied by enemy soldiers demonstrated the need for deck armour on LCA. Production of new craft soon incorporated 1/4 inch armour for the decks over the hold and the stoker's position.

In April two troops of No. 4 Commando and eight officers and 43 other ranks of the Carleton and York Regiment (1st Canadian Infantry Division) took part in Abercrombie, a raid on Hardelot, France, near Boulogne. The LCAs of HMS Prince Albert transported the party. This raid also marked the first operational use of the new LCS. The raid set out on the night of 19 April with the LCAs towed by MGBs. The plan was for the party to travel to within two miles (3.2 km) of the French coast on the MGBs and then transfer to the LCA for the landing. Due to high seas and strong winds, which swamped and sank LCA 211, the raid was stopped with the loss of two naval ratings. The raid was remounted two nights later in calmer seas, but the period of optimum tide, moon, and darkness had past. The raid became uncoordinated, and whilst the commandos got ashore and began their mission, the boats with the regular infantry became lost. Soon a German E-Boat was engaged by the MGBs. The army officers in the LCA conferred and decided not to disembark. Aboard the LCS, the senior naval officer's compass failed, and the flotilla only returned to England steered by Lt. Groom's army compass.

==== Madagascar ====
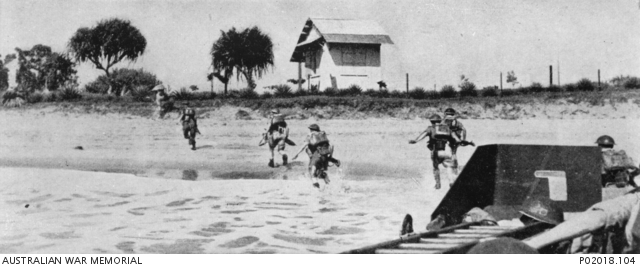
British soldiers landing at Tamatave 18 September 1942. The portside Lewis gun shelter of their LCA is visible at the bottom right

In response to the dramatic Japanese advances in early 1942, Combined Operations landing craft were shipped to the Indian Ocean for Operation Ironclad, the invasion of the Vichy French colony of Madagascar on 5 May. Following the assault, it was intended that the craft would be sent on to India and Burma.

The initial target was the naval base at Diégo Suarez. The harbor entrance faced east and was well defended with gun batteries, but a neck of land 3 to 6 miles (4.8 to 9.7 km) wide separated Diégo Suarez from good landing beaches, in Courrier Bay and Ambararata Bay, on the northwest coast. The Joint Planners decided in favour of these western beaches as opposed to a direct approach. This decision had a definite effect on the employment of the LCAs. Despite the advantages of the western approach the LCAs and other vessels would have to contend with rocks, reefs, and mines.

===== Diégo Suarez =====
Ironclad was Britain's longest range amphibious operation of the war. The landing ships were the LSIs HMS Winchester Castle with 14 LCAs, HMS Royal Ulsterman, Keren, and Karanja each carrying 6 LCAs, Sobieski with LCP(L)s, RFA Derwentdale carrying 15 LCM(Mk. 1)s to land tanks and other vehicles, and HMS Bachaquero, the world's first operational LST. Few could sleep between supper and midnight 4 May because of the turgid tropical heat and the noise from preparing the LCAs. Across the boat decks of the LSIs, all sorts of stores were being manhandled into the LCAs. Because of the long journeys which the landing craft had to make from the parent ships to the landing beaches in Courrier Bay and Ambararata Bay, the landing craft crews ate breakfast at midnight on 4/5 May. At 02:00 the convoy had reached the outer anchorage, and the minesweepers were clearing the 8 miles (13 km) lanes to the main anchorage. The five blacked-out LSIs sailed towards the coast proceeding slowly in line ahead. The assault troops gathered by platoon at their assigned gangways and clambered into the LCAs. Orders were given to lower all assault craft to within 6 feet (1.8 m) of the waterline. The electric motors of ships' davits accomplished this with soldiers (and vehicles, in the case of LCMs) aboard.

Each LSI could just see the faint outline of the nearest ship ahead, as the convoy furtively sailed forwards. Navigation marker-lights appeared marking the swept channel. The night was silent save the low throb of ships' engines, the churning of water, and the explosion of two swept mines (one at 03:00 and the other at 03:15). In good time, the ships hove to and anchored. Electric motor noise filled the air once more as the LCAs were lowered the remaining distance and met the sea with a loud splash. Then the LCAs chugged away, fully loaded with soldiers and equipment, headed into the darkness.

The searchlight of HMS Lightning guided the LSI Royal Ulsterman into Courrier Bay carrying No. 5 Commando to an assault preliminary to the main landing. At 04:30, the Royal Ulsterman's LCA touched down at the base of a 50 feet (15 m) cliff, which the commandos then proceeded to scale achieving complete surprise over the two Vichy gun crews. The landings in Courrier Bay were designated Red North, Red Centre, Red South, and in addition to No. 5 Commando, LCAs also landed a company of the East Lancashire Regiment.

A small force of corvettes proceeded the LCAs to their landing beaches in Ambararata Bay, sweeping mines clear and placing navigational lights to mark safe passage through the rocks, enabling the flotillas to land 29th Brigade without casualties. The beaches here were designated Blue for the South Lancashire Regiment and the balance of the East Lancashires north of the bay, White for the Royal Welch Fusiliers in the centre, and Green for the Royal Scots Fusiliers at the south end of the bay. Touch down was 04:45, 1¼ hours before sunrise (06:06 on 5.5.42). The landings were made in darkness, though with almost a half-moon in the sky. Also, the sea was very calm. Complete surprise was achieved, against light or no opposition, as the Vichy French believed navigating through the reefs and rocks efficiently in the dark was not likely. After retracting, the LCAs began making return trips back and forth with reinforcements and equipment. When the sun rose, the landing craft crews in Courrier Bay discovered that they were surrounded by jagged rocks that continued as far out to seaward as they could see.

Because the approaches were more heavily mined than anticipated, the ships of the invasion fleet were unable to use the main anchorage safely until it was properly swept. As the day proceeded, ship to shore travel became more difficult as a south-easterly gale blew up and made heavy seas. But by this time, no one thought to delay operations for better weather. Thus, LCAs were required to make long and frequent journeys from ship to shore with supplies and reinforcements in worsening sea conditions.

Originally, the Joint Planners had limited Ironclad to the capture of Diego Suarez, after which the LCAs and other amphibious assets would travel on to India. With the naval base now in British control the Admiralty gave orders 16 May that further operations in Madagascar were to be abandoned. The ships and craft assembled for Ironclad were assigned to other pressing duties. However, South African prime minister Smuts insisted on further Madagascan ports being captured. This, along with a Vichy decision to fight on, kept LCAs employed in Madagascar through the end of September.

===== Majunga, Morondava, and Nossi-Bé =====
On 10 September, LCAs landed the lead elements of the 29th Brigade at Majunga, in north-western Madagascar, to re-launch offensive operations ahead of the rainy season. Though zero hour was supposed to be before dawn some of the landing craft broke down. The landings took place later in the day without the cover of darkness. As machine guns began firing on the landing craft, the support vessels fired on the shore providing cover to the assaulting troops, who suffered casualties as they stormed the quayside. Along the beaches the high tide at the time of the assault carried the landing craft very close to the main seafront road, and at least one LCA was beached and stranded until the next tide The follow on units of the 22nd (East African) Brigade also landed in LCAs and LCMs. At the same time, in a violent thunderstorm, a troop of No. 5 Commando made a diversionary assault on a radio station and airfield at Morondava, more than 400 miles (640 km) south of Majunga. The commandos were not transported in LCAs, but entered the port aboard the destroyer HMAS Napier.

During the Madagascar operations it became obvious that the LCA design was not ideal for utility and supply purposes and future expeditions were allotted more LCMs and LCVs. LCAs were used in additional landings during the campaign before Madagascar surrendered in September.

==== Dieppe ====
Sixty LCAs were involved in Operation Jubilee at Dieppe in August and carried the assault infantry of the 2nd Canadian Infantry Division, A Commando Royal Marines, and No. 4 Commando. Eight LCS(M)(Mk I)s were among the fire support craft. The plan for this large-scale raid was for the force to stay ashore for two tides and re-embark on the rising tide before dark. The operation included landings on beaches designated (west to east) Orange, Green, White, Red, Blue, and Yellow. (Note: No. 3 Commando, "A" Royal Marine Commando, the 2nd Division's floating reserve - le Fusiliers Mont-Royal, and certain follow-on units were transported in other landing craft types.)

Until Dieppe, LCAs had only been used in small numbers. The part of the naval plan, 'Outline for Operation' (JNO 1), for the Dieppe Raid that involved LCAs, and other minor landing craft, was much more complicated than any previous combined operations plan. In all other sizable raids beforehand coxswains had groped in the darkness and spent extra time while finding the correct landing beaches. Now a large number of flotillas of various landing craft types needed to coordinate their activities. The endless working-up practices and landing exercises carried out prior to the Dieppe assault were not confined to training infantry; they were also designed to shake down the crews of the landing craft flotillas. This was necessary because officers and ratings with LCA experience were not left idle after operations, but were reassigned to other pressing duties throughout the Navy. This massive raid required more trained crews and more flotilla coordination. The few experienced LCA hands available had to be supplemented by dozens of new crewmen collected by the RNVR. These had to learn how to approach a beach, ground on it, disembark troops, ease off the beach, and remain off shore within instant call, ready to come when necessary.

In the Jubilee plan, the LCAs for 2nd Division were to touch down just before dawn. The lowering point for the landing ships was 10 miles (16 km) from the shore. Here too was an added complication, because naval planners wished to avoid the danger of flotillas colliding, becoming mixed together and confused. Therefore, zero hour was to be half an hour later for the inner than the outer beaches. At about 03:00 (Note: All times in the Dieppe section of this article are British Summer Time, that is, one hour ahead of Greenwich Mean Time.) the LCAs were to be lowered from their landing ships. Once the LCAs were away, the ships would then sail back to England. The LCAs would make the two-hour journey to the shore. On 19 August, Nautical Twilight was 04:31 and sunrise 05:50. The four outer landings would touch down at 04:50 and the two inner flotillas of LCAs would touch down half an hour later. After disembarking their troops the LCAs, along with other landing craft types, were to withdraw away from the coast a few miles to an area protected by a smoke screen designated as the "boat pool." Here the landing craft would wait until ordered to re-embark the assault force at the end of the operation. The LCAs were to make their own way back. Despite the plan, the raid soon began to go wrong.

At 03:47, while approximately seven miles from the French coast, the 1st and 24th Flotillas (LCP(L)), some craft crewed by RCNVR, carrying No. 3 Commando, were illuminated by star shells fired from a group of German armed trawlers. The element of surprise was lost.

===== Orange Beach =====
At the lowering position, ten miles (16 km) off the coast, at 03:00, aboard the LSI Prins Albert the boatswain's whistle summoned the troops of No. 4 Commando to the loading deck. Seven LCAs waited on their davits for the commandos, most of whom were overloaded with 3" mortar bombs and equipment, to walk across the gangways onto the sterns of the landing craft. Zero hour for landing was to be 04:50 and re-embarkation was timed for 07:30 — two hours and forty minutes for the commando operation. In darkness, the LCAs were then lowered into the Channel. Prins Albert's eighth LCA would be employed in transporting Goatley boats to the withdrawal at the close of the operation. Once the landing craft were away, Prins Albert sailed back to England.

The landing craft enjoyed a number of navigating advantages, mostly planned, but one great windfall was provided by the Germans. The flotilla formed two columns behind their navigational guide, MGB 312, and set off for the coast. Also escorting the flotilla was Steam Gun Boat (SGB) 9, ready to provide close support. Both these gun boats possessed far more sophisticated navigational instruments than the LCA.

The Pointe d'Ailly Lighthouse was working. Its silhouette stood out plainly against the horizon from sea level; even when not lit it could be seen for five miles (8.0 km) on a clear night through binoculars. For the LCA flotilla, tactical surprise seemed possible, as it was highly improbable that the enemy would be obliging enough to assist the Royal Navy with such a brilliant navigational aid.

Looking over to the east, at 03:50, those aboard these LCAs could see the gunfire and flares that marked the collision of the Yellow Beach flotillas with the German convoy. Once the fire of the engagement far off to port died away, navigation was aided again by the spectacle of red and green navigation lights shining steadily on Dieppe's harbour entrance.

At about 04:30, just before Nautical Twilight, the flotilla broke into two; one group of three LCAs continued on the same bearing toward Vasterival (Orange One Beach) and four LCAs followed MGB 312 to a new bearing starboard along the coast to Quiberville (Orange Two Beach). Approximately 2 miles (3.2 km) separated the Orange beaches. Two Spitfires flew overhead and fired on the lighthouse which straight away doused its light. Anti-aircraft fire went aloft along the coast as additional planes strafed the Hess Battery, creating a distraction which covered the approach of the landing-craft.

The first LCA group, arriving at 04:50 at Orange One Beach, touched down with textbook precision — at the right beach at the right time. The shingle beach was simply a narrow cove, perhaps seventy yards long with the beach sixty yards deep. The Commandos raced up the beach unopposed.

The four LCAs approaching Quiberville were observed from shore and illuminated by star shell at 04:53, just as they were making their final run in to touch down. Orange Two Beach was larger - some 300 yards (270 m) long and 400 yards (370 m) deep with an incline to the right leading to the wide valley of the River Saane. Incoming machine-gun fire from pillboxes did not cause casualties while the commandos were aboard the armoured landing craft.

This unit was able to accomplish its mission: the destruction of the Hess Battery.

Once the LCAs had landed the Commando at Quiberville, they withdrew and made their way to Vasterival. The Commandos' withdrawal was made through Orange One Beach, the calculation being that the German reaction would concentrate on Quiberville. In this the plan was most successful. The enemy made no attempt to counter-attack, only desultory sniping. The re-embarkation began at approximately 07:30 under cover of 18-type smoke generators on the beach and naval smoke floats on the water. The wide, flat beach and rapidly ebbing tide made re-embarkation difficult, and the troops had to wade out up to their necks to reach the landing-craft which had waited unmolested fifty yards off-shore throughout the operation. The Commandos had to wade out to the LCAs because the fast-ebbing tide threatened to strand any craft that touched down. Goatley collapsible boats were brought in by an LCA crew to help cover the water gap, widening by the fast ebbing tide. German prisoners were used to carry the wounded down to the water where they were placed in the Goatley boats for the trip out to the LCA. By 08:15, the LCAs had re-embarked the raiders. Two miles offshore the wounded were transferred to a destroyer on the way back to the boat pool around HMS Calpe and then the LCAs returned the approximately 65 miles (105 km) to England under their own power.

===== Blue Beach =====
The main landings, those by 2nd Canadian Division, were mostly crushed on the beaches. At Puys (Blue Beach), some of the LCAs transporting The Royal Regiment of Canada mistook for their guide boat another similar craft. Corrections in course were made, but this was at the cost of arriving a quarter of an hour late. Touch down at Puys was about 05:10 in the light of dawn and amid German flares, instead of 04:50 darkness. Some LCAs were able to provide the men first off a dry landing, but those last off the landing craft had to jump into the water and wade ashore. (In certain beaching conditions, each man's last step as he ran off the ramp pushed the LCA back out to sea.) Alasdair Ferguson, second-in-command of the seven LCAs of the 10th LCA Flotilla, carried on HMS Princess Astrid, felt his LCA scrape bottom as enemy fire poured down from a cliff, entering the craft. Having touched down, he ordered "Down ramp!" and urged the troops of the Royal Regiment of Canada and the Royal Canadian Artillery onto the beach. Soldiers were shot down before they cleared the ramp, where their bodies blocked others. Others fell as they crossed the beach to the seawall 40 feet (12 m) away. The operation was not successful. All three waves (1st and 2nd LCA, and 3rd LCM1) on Blue Beach were subject to withering fire. The Royal Regiment were trapped against the impenetrable seawall.

Since the third wave had landed on Blue Beach at 05:45 few other craft had been able even to approach the shore. At 07:00 two craft picked up a request from the beach party. LCA 209 went in but was immediately half swamped by a rush of soldiers. She tried to back off but was hit by an enemy shell and sank 50 yards out, killing all save two crew and a soldier. At 09:40 the signal to withdraw was sent to all the assault forces - "Vanquish 1100 hours". (Note: Military 24-hour clock. 1100 would be spoken as "eleven-hundred".) This presented great difficulties for the LCAs as they were designed best to beach on rising tides and the tide would not rise again for some hours. A few soldiers managed to swim out and be picked up by friendly craft but many more were killed in the attempt. Unarmoured craft could not come near the beach because the fire was too heavy. Several LCAs went in to evacuate troops, including the four surviving craft of the 10th LCA Flotilla, but suffered due to the intense fire from mortars and machine-guns; two 10th Flotilla craft were sunk. When Ferguson saw that there was no sign of life on the beach, he reluctantly obeyed an order to withdraw. Only one craft, LCA 209, managed to touch down on Blue Beach for the evacuation and while taking wounded aboard it was unable to raise its ramp before it pushed off the beach. Grenades and mortar bombs added more casualties, and with men hanging on to LCA 209's sides, mortar bombs finally sank it. By 08:30 the Royal Regiment had surrendered.

===== White Beach and Red Beach =====
The main beaches on the Dieppe waterfront are almost a mile long. Following strafing of the defenses by aircraft, and a short bombardment by destroyers, aircraft laid a blanket of smoke on Dieppe Harbour. LCSs with heavy machine-guns and smoke mortars engaged targets ashore and provided a smoke-screen over the eastern headlands. The LCSs continued to engage targets all morning, but also suffered extensively from the defenders' fire. The first wave of LCAs touched down between 05:20 and 05:23. They carried The Royal Hamilton Light Infantry to Red Beach and The Essex Scottish Regiment to White Beach. Once the infantry left the armour-plated protection of the LCAs they were in a killing field. None of the preparatory fire had diminished the defense, and the new tank landing craft, designed to deliver tanks to accompany the assault infantry, were ten minutes late. As the smoke drifted off, the Canadians found themselves savagely pinned down. Their landing craft, LCAs and LCM(Mk. I)s, had orders to collect off the coast in the boat pool - an area covered in smoke. Adding to the tragedy, the floating reserve, Les Fusiliers Mont-Royal, were sent to reinforce the Essex Scottish, who had been incorrectly reported as making good progress. The Fusiliers were transported in LCP(L) Eureka boats made of seven-plywood; they provided no protection from bullets or shrapnel. The Fusiliers received fire all the way in to the beach, and only 125 of them made it back to England. On White Beach, LCAs landed 369 men of A Commando Royal Marines in withering fire - none got more than a few yards ashore.

On these central invasion beaches, it was vital that the Canadians hold the Casino as its capture would make the whole of the shoreline untenable. When the signal to withdraw was sent and the time arrived, The Royal Navy started to move in to extricate the Canadians and the RAF began to lay smoke. Flights of LCAs and LCM(Mk 1)s came in and suffered heavy casualties but the Royal Navy managed to extricate several hundred Canadian troops before the Canadians withdrew from the Casino and the beach became impossible to defend. At 12:20, the Naval Force Commander gave the order to stop the evacuation as the beach was virtually all in enemy hands. The German garrison ceased firing at 13:58 after LCA 186, the last craft to return from Dieppe, quit the beach.

===== Green Beach =====
At Pourville (Green Beach), LCAs carrying the South Saskatchewan Regiment touched down on the shingle beach at approximately 04:52 without having been detected. All the troops got ashore before the Germans opened fire. This was less than half an hour after zero hour. The LCA flotillas had left their landing ships punctually, but lost time on the run in. As the landing craft moved shoreward they received "a warm wind laden with the smell of hayfields blowing upon them from the south." Unfortunately, some of the landing craft had drifted off course on the way in, and most of the battalion was disembarked west of the Scie River, not east of it as planned. The opposition was much lighter on Green Beach for the landing craft and did not begin to stiffen for the South Saskatchewans until they were getting established on shore. German resistance to the Saskatchewans had been stiffening inland, but Green Beach was still not receiving heavy fire at approximately 05:35 when a LCA landed the Queen's Own Cameron Highlanders of Canada. By 08:45 the expected link-up with Churchill tanks of the Calgary Regiment landing at White Beach had not taken place. When, at 09:40, the signal to withdraw was sent, German resistance was growing and the Saskatchewans and Camerons were being fought to a standstill.

Confusion between ship and shore led to the South Saskatchewans reducing their defensive perimeter too quickly, yielding the western heights to German infantry. The original order for evacuation was for 10:00 but was changed to 11:00. The change proved disastrous for the assault troops, as the Queen's Own Cameron Highlanders of Canada had already started to withdraw to the beach at 09:30, closely followed by the Saskatchewans. They would have to contend with the increasing enemy action for another hour, despite the perimeter now being too close to the beach. At about 10:30, all available craft were sent to Green Beach at Dieppe, which was still under intense fire from mortars and machine-guns. At 10:45, six LCAs came inshore to Green Beach under heavy fire. It was a mistake; the evacuation should have begun on Red Beach. As Alasdair Ferguson grounded his LCA, he could see no movement on the beach. Moments later, so many troops were rushing Ferguson's craft that it was swamped and, as he made out to sea, the craft was hit by a shell and capsized. He helped the survivors board another craft, and the traumatized sailors and soldiers returned to Newhaven. The other five LCAs participated in a chaotic evacuation, taking men aboard and clearing the beach successfully, but casualties mounted. A second flight of LCAs appeared soon after, but the state of the tide was changing markedly and the risk of becoming stranded kept the LCAs well off shore. The loss of the western heights and the receding tide made further attempts to evacuate most costly. Heavy losses occurred on the sand and in the water. By 11:30, the few men left on the beach were overwhelmed by an enemy attack and captured while attempting to disengage.

===== Yellow Beach =====
No. 3 Commando were carried to Yellow Beach in LCP(L)s. No LCAs were present on Yellow Beach.

===== Losses and results =====
Of the 33 landing craft of all types lost, approximately half, 17, were LCAs, along with 1 LCS(M)(Mk I), No. 9. Two more LCS(M)(Mk I)s, No. 8 and No. 25, were damaged sufficiently in fire-fights off Blue Beach during the evacuation that most of their crews were casualties and their guns silenced. The crews bringing in the landing craft to the beaches, as well as assault troops trying to get to them, again suffered significant casualties from intense German fire.

As a result of the Dieppe raid, the Royal Navy determined to keep permanent assault groups. The LCA flotillas of Dieppe in 1942 remained together with other Dieppe naval assets and became the Force J (for 'Jubilee') that again carried Canadians, this time to assault Juno Beach on D-Day.

==== The Torch landings ====
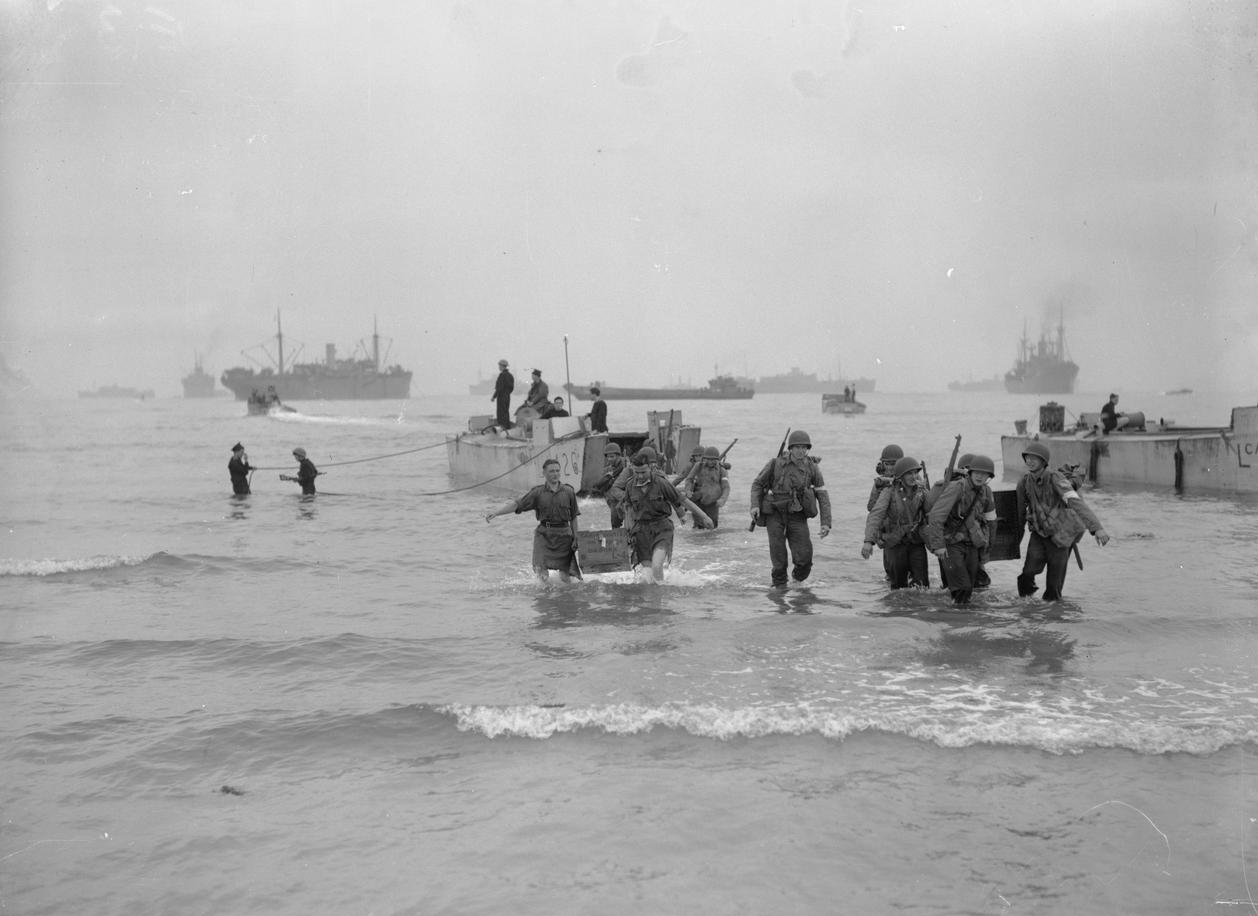
American troops unload stores from LCA 26 at Beach Z, near Arzeu

The invasion of French North Africa, Operation Torch, took place 8 November. The operation involved three Task Forces - Western, Centre, and Eastern - landing US and British divisions over 500 miles of coast.

The Western Task Force sailed directly from the United States and landed near Mehdia, Casablanca, and at Safi. This task force contained no LCAs.

Making landings inside the Mediterranean at Algiers and Oran were two task forces composed primarily of British ships. In these landings LCAs were the most numerous landing craft type. Torch was the largest amphibious operation mounted to date and was done on a "shoestring" budget with regard to landing craft and personnel. Combined Operations establishments were combed through zealously for personnel in anticipation of the operation. The requirements were so great that partially trained crews were embarked in Landing Ships (some had not operated an LCA until they were on board). The Combined Operations HQ was under considerable strain as the demands increased. The operational plan had originally asked for 15 LSIs. 25 eventually participated. Originally, as the Torch plan was developed, 91 LCA and crews were required, but eventually 140 LCAs were employed. For want of training, several LCA flotillas got into difficulties. Even the trained crews were subjected to operations in a foreign environment; the coasts of French North Africa were vastly different from the Scottish establishments used for training.

===== Algiers =====
The approximately 50 miles of coast assaulted by the Eastern Task force was divided into 3 sectors – A, B, and C (Apple, Beer, and Charlie). In the last hour of 7 November, the landing craft were launched from their parent ships, in a moderate swell, a new moon and a westward current of about 4 knots. Running west to east beginning just east of Castiglione were Apple Green and Apple White, assaulted by 11 Brigade, British 78th Infantry Division. Just east of Cape Sidi Ferruch was Beer Green, assaulted by No. 1 Commando, and Beer White assaulted by 168 Regt., US 34th Infantry Division. US Navy transports were in the majority at Charlie Beach to the east of Algiers, and it is likely that no LCAs were employed there during the initial landings.

====== A Sector ======
At 23:49, flotillas of LCAs moved off from LSIs Karanja, Viceroy of India, and Marnix van Suit Aldegonde to land 11 Brigade well on the Apple beaches. There was some delay off these westernmost beaches, late in the night of 7 November, as a small French convoy appeared, distracting the minesweepers guiding the LCAs to the beaches. Still, the flotillas continued toward the objective and A Green flight beached at H-Hour (01:00). A White flight touched down at H-hour + 8 minutes. Some delay and confusion, and damage to landing craft, was caused by the unexpected shallowness of water and sandbars. Although periscope observations had been carried out, no reconnaissance parties had landed on the beaches to determine local conditions.

=== 1943 ===
==== Far East ====
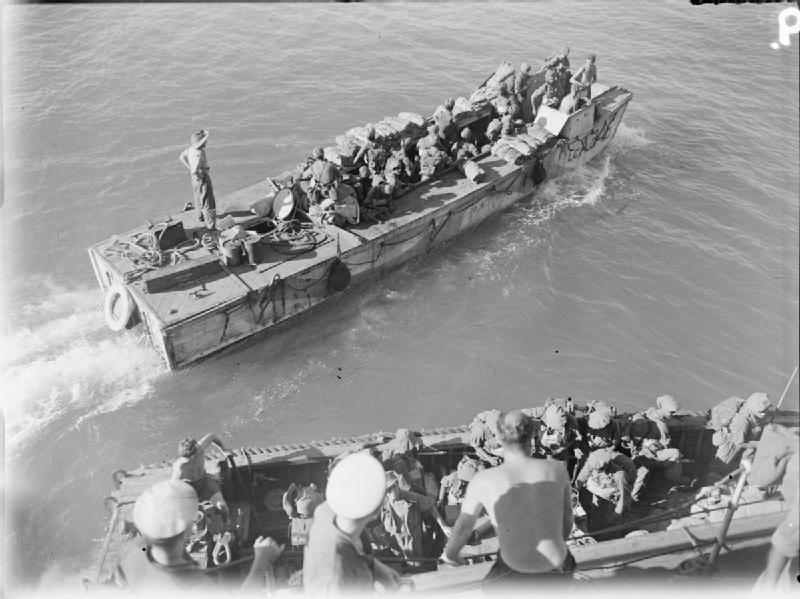
Indian troops embarking from the cruiser HMS Kenya in a landing craft assault (LCA 346) to take over from the Royal Marines, South of Ramree, Burma.

By February it was obvious that there would be no major amphibious operation in Burma before the onset of the monsoon season, due in the Bay of Bengal in May. Nevertheless, Lieutenant Commander Robert D. Franks, RN, managed to introduce two craft, LCS(M) 17 and LCS(M) 23, into the Mayu River, which empties into the Bay of Bengal just north of Akyab, and of which the Japanese held the mouth. The little flotilla was meant to frustrate Japanese use of the river to reinforce their army which was pushing the British north. Two Motor Launches of the Burma Royal Navy Volunteer Reserve (BRNVR) had forced their way into the river already. For two and a half months these two LCSs, designed for the English Channel, and the two BRNVR MLs took turns dodging Japanese patrols by day, and wrecking Japanese outposts and ambushing Japanese supply craft at night among the creeks and chaungs. On 25 April, LCS(M) 17 was sunk by enemy action. Gradually, the Japanese advance over land forced Franks higher up the river: he might have continued operations against the enemy, but in mid-May he was shot up by the RAF and decided it was unsafe to stay in the no-man's-land between the two armies. The British troops had had to withdraw so far up the river that there was no longer enough depth of water for the other three vessels to manoeuvre. The MLs were destroyed by their crews, and the remaining LCS(M) 23 was laid up at Taung Bazaar on a muddy bank where it was claimed by the jungle. The 21 British Empire survivors of this vicious little campaign had to struggle back to friendly lines on foot through swamps.

==== The Sicily Landings ====
Operation Husky, the invasion of Sicily in July 1943, was the first direct assault on the defended territory of an Axis homeland, and the most complex combined operations expedition yet. All together, 94 LCAs were employed in six of the seven landing areas. In addition, new craft and vehicles were used on some beaches in preference to LCAs. The results of such innovations were mixed.

Most of the LCAs were in the Eastern Task Force sector, landing initial assault units of the Eighth Army in the Gulf of Noto and around Cape Passero. The Western Task Force employed LCAs in landing Seventh Army infantry and Rangers near Licata and Gela.

The date for the invasion, Saturday, 10 July, occurred in the second quarter of the moon. This was not an ideal phase of the moon where the Navy was concerned; complete darkness would have been preferred. Although the landing ships of the assault forces approached Sicily in a brilliant waxing moon, which would not set until the vessels had stopped in their lowering positions, the LCAs made their approach to the coast in darkness. H-Hour was fixed at 02:45, almost two hours before first light.

On the afternoon of D-1 an unexpected north-westerly gale (force 7) blew up and the invasion fleet's small craft were tossed about. On D-Day itself the sea had calmed considerably as the hours passed, but continued churning from the gale. Joss, Dime, Cent, Bark West, and Bark South Areas experienced heavier seas in the wake of the storm. Bark East, Acid South, and Acid North benefited from somewhat calmer water afforded by being on the leeward of Sicily.

===== Joss =====
In the Joss landings, the LSIs HMS Princess Astrid and HMS Princess Charlotte anchored approximately 3 miles (4.8 km) from Licata, about the time that the moon was setting; at 01:00, 10 July. The 3rd US Rangers aboard filed into the LCAs and were lowered into the sea. Their objective was to hold the western flank of the 3rd US Division's landing area. By 01:50, the Rangers left ship on their way to Licata. At 04:00, about half an hour before first light, 6 of the 8 LCAs Astrid launched returned. Italian resistance at Licata had been lighter than at Gela. Even so, the surf had been severe and the other two LCAs had been left stranded on beach.

===== Dime =====
In the Dime landings, LCAs from the LSIs HMS Prince Charles and HMS Prince Leopold landed the 1st and 4th Ranger Battalions. Though the crossing in the LSIs had been storm-tossed, by the time the ship came to its Transport Area the gale had settled. One Ranger recalls the sea "was almost mirror like; it was kind of eerie." As LCAs closed the beach, flares and rockets filled the sky. One LCA was damaged by a shell that snapped a cable securing the ramp; the craft immediately flooded and all aboard were lost except the coxswain. Although Italian resistance was more determined at Gela, and the beach was mined, the rest of the LCAs delivered their Rangers to their pier objective.

===== Bark West =====
Still, the sea was not ideal for landing craft. The diary of one RCN LCA bowman states:

At 12:15 a.m., we were lowered away. It was pretty grim, since there was a great wind and the davits themselves were shaking. When we hit the water our LCAs really took a beating... The soldiers were very seasick and for the first time, I thought I would be a victim. Up in the bow, I swallowed more salt water than I thought existed.

However these unfavourable conditions had a beneficial side effect - the enemy relaxed their guard in the belief that a landing in such conditions was not likely and initial resistance proved less than expected. Newer craft were used in the Sicily invasion such as the DUKW amphibious truck; the Landing Craft Infantry (Large) (LCI(L)), and, for the first time in numbers, the much larger Landing Ship Tank (LST Mk 2). None of these supplanted the LCA in its designed role; none of these new types was intended for the initial assault and the LCA was still vital for first wave transportation on contested shores.

===== Bark South =====
The ships and craft landing the 51st (Highland) Division arrived at their lowering positions 7 miles (11 km) south of Capo Passero by 23:00. During the night, even before the run in to Bark South, the 51st Division suffered losses from crushing and drowning when troops transferred from the LSI Queen Emma to LCI(L)s in the midst of the storm, but on the morning that followed the Division was put ashore with fewer than a dozen casualties. Many suffered from seasickness, even in the large troop transports. Here LCAs were filled with soldiers and lowered, after which the craft formed flotillas and moved to their respective waiting positions, Red and Green, a mile off Bark South.

The LCAs for the initial assault wave were scheduled to touch down at 02:45, which they managed, and in most cases at the correct beaches. At approximately 03:15, LCIs and LCTs moving the reserve companies and assaulting battalion's headquarters were to touch down. Unfortunately, this wave was not so successful; a number of craft initially failed to locate their designated beaches, and, arriving 30 to 60 minutes late, delayed the division's movement inland. Soon after, at 03:45, the LCIs and LCTs of the brigade reserve follow-up flight were to be in the vicinity of the beaches ready to beach when opportunity afforded. All craft were to be beached by first light (04:39) or be in an unsinkable position by that time. To enable loading to be carried out after sunrise, 05:47, arrangements were made for ample smoke canisters to be carried in all craft, so that the area of the landing beaches could be adequately smoked should the need arise.

Among the naval support for the LCAs approaching Bark South were LCS(M)s to provide supporting fire during their approach to the beaches. The naval plan worked adequately, with few exceptions, and there was no enemy air or sea interdiction. The Mediterranean was rough, however, and most of troops travelling in LCAs suffered sea-sickness, one man so much so that he died. Some worry plagued planners regarding LCAs swamping in the heavy surf at the shoreline, but the crews touched down and retracted their craft without serious difficulty. Anxious minutes passed at the Red and Green waiting positions, as by zero hour, (Note: Sources referring to the 51st Division's Sicily landing often use the term 'Zero Hour' common in the British army since at least the First World War. The 1st Canadian Division's invasion plan used the new American mnemonic, 'H-Hour.') when the assault wave of LCAs had beached, many of the LCIs and most of the LCTs had not arrived. This was largely due to the rough sea which, though inconvenient for landing ships carrying LCAs, had considerably reduced the distances landing craft could cover.

==== Baytown ====
At 04:30 on 3 September, approximately an hour before first light, LCAs carrying British 5th Division and Canadian 1st Division troops of the 13th Corps, Eighth Army, touched down after crossing the Strait of Messina into Calabria. This was a shore to shore landing craft operation with the assault forces embarking at Mili Marina, south of Messina, and travelling an average of 12,000 yards to their assault beaches. The LCAs and LCMs that comprised the initial assault wave were joined by DUKWs and LCI(L)s in later waves. The flotillas were led in by Motor Launches, and guided by directional tracer from Bofors guns along with four vertical searchlight beams to allow coxswains to keep their bearings. Still, navigation proved difficult. The rapid and irregular currents, whirlpools, and winds of the Messina Strait hampered navigation. Though the night was starlit, with no moon, the prodigious artillery barrage accompanying the assault contained a high number of smoke rounds (500). The navigation lights of the guiding Motor Launches, which LCA coxswains were to follow, became lost among the lights on the opposing shore.

The task of 13th Corps was to cross the Straits and land in two small bays north of Reggio. The 1st Canadian Division, landing at Fox Beach, a short distance north of Reggio, were to capture the town and the airfield south of town, while 5th Division took San Giovanni, to the north, and the coastline to Canitello. The artillery barrage on the beach was planned to take advantage of the LCA's splinter-proof armoured protection. The barrage would lift from the beach only moments before touchdown for the LCAs. Apart from some craft landing in the wrong places, and some mixing of the divisions, the assault troops landed without difficulty and with little hindrance from the enemy. Following the assault phase, the LCAs were used to ferry supplies. By the evening of D+1 the landing of supplies had gone so well that the build-up was 1½ days ahead of schedule.

==== Far East ====
Toward the end of 1943, ships from one assault force (HMS Bulolo and six LSIs with their attendant LCAs) that had taken part in Husky were transferred to India only to be recalled to the Mediterranean for Anzio.

=== 1944 ===
==== Normandy landings ====
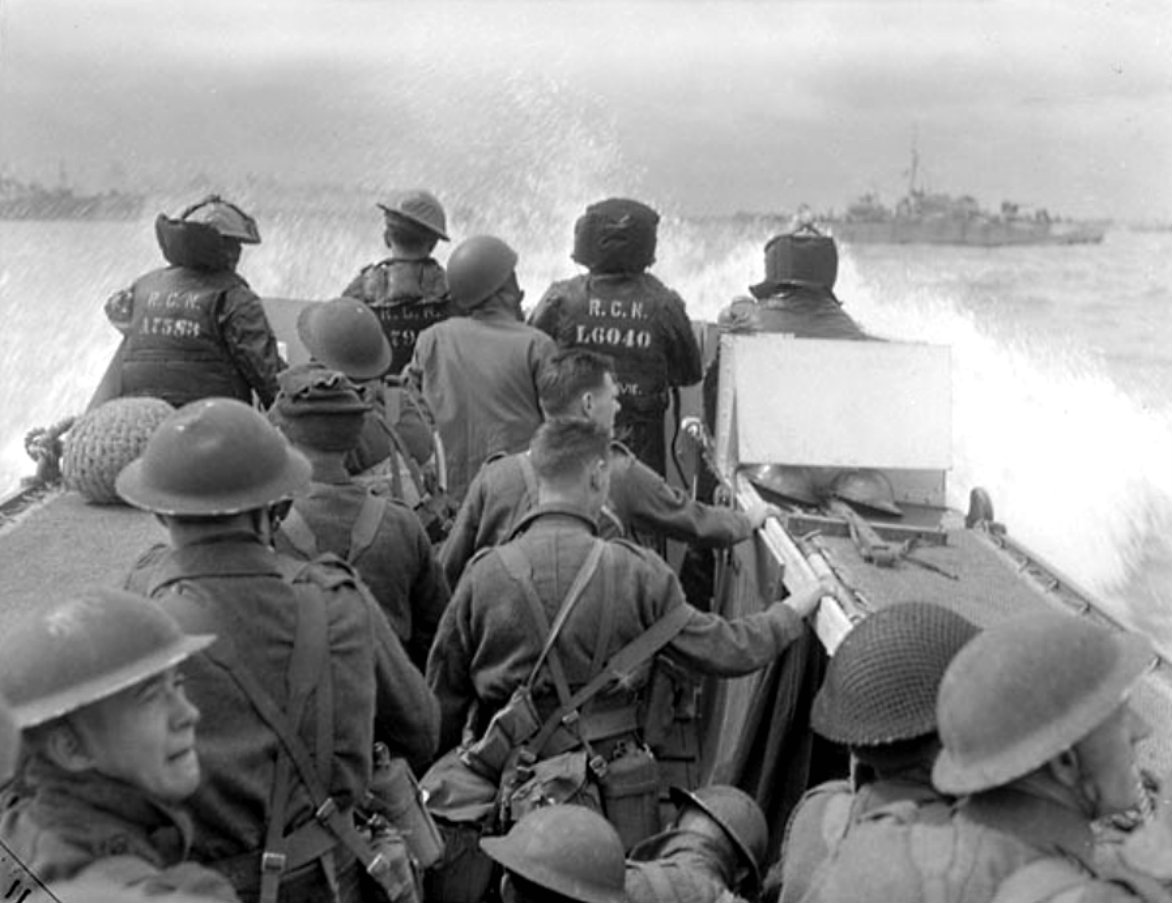
LCA going ashore from HMCS Prince Henry off the Normandy beachhead, France, 6 June 1944

On D-Day LCAs put troops ashore at Juno, Gold, and Sword Beaches. LCAs landed the US infantry formations on either flank of Omaha Beach and the Rangers who assaulted Pointe du Hoc. The westernmost landings on Utah Beach and the pre-dawn landing on Îles Saint-Marcouf were also carried in LCAs.

The LCA type was confronted with many challenges on D-Day; some presented by the Neptune plan, some by the enemy defences, and others by the weather. The initial seaborne assault on the Normandy coast broke with previous Allied practice, in that it was made in daylight. The invasion could occur 6 June because the date satisfied certain preliminary requirements. Of particular concern to landing craft, H-Hour was fixed forty minutes after nautical twilight. H-Hour was also fixed for three hours before high-water mark. The tide in the English Channel rises from west to east (high water in Utah area occurs approximately 40 minutes before it occurs in the Sword area), and so some difference in H-Hour were planned among the assault areas in order to provide the initial assault landing craft the full advantage of a rising tide. Among the many variable concerns to be considered by the planners was whether to land below, among, or above the line of Element 'C' obstacles. The sea conditions at many places along the coast (6' waves and 2.7-knot (5.0 km/h) currents) were just at the outside operational limit of the LCA. The setting of the Transportation Area 11 miles (18 km) from shore presented an additional complication for LCAs operating in the Western Task Force Area in these condition.

A total of 474 LCAs were used on the first day of D-Day (of which 132 were lost or seriously damaged). With a high demand for crews for all types of landing craft at the time of the Normandy landings, the Royal Navy crews were supplemented by training Royal Marines to operate LCAs. RN crews were preferentially assigned to the larger types of landing craft. Consequently, many assault flotillas were entirely manned by Royal Marine crews.

===== Gold Beach =====
Just before 05:58, (Note: All times in the Normandy section of this article are British Double Summer Time, that is, two hours ahead of Greenwich Mean Time) moments before daybreak, at a lowering position 7 miles (11 km) off shore, a bugler sounded reveille on the LSI Empire Lance. The 6th Green Howards, of 69th Brigade, formed their boat sections on deck and then boarded their LCAs down scramble nets. The storm of the previous day was abating, but the weather was still grey, cold, and rainy. The water was rough, with swells as great as 6 ft (1.8 m). (2 m) and each LCA rose and fell in an alarming fashion. Once their craft were loaded, the crews pulled away from the landing ship and sailed their LCAs forward to form the flotilla line for the run in to the beach.

The approach to Gold area was to be no easy matter for the LCAs scheduled to make H-Hour at 07:25. The assembly of the flotillas proved difficult, with the seas running higher than in other landing areas. The timing schedule was upset by the tide, which was driven in-shore by a strong north-westerly wind, with water levels running 30 minutes earlier than normal. After the assault, 2,500 obstacles were counted that the Germans had emplaced on this coastal front of 3 1/4 miles (5.2 km). It proved almost impossible for engineers and beach obstacle clearance parties to make lanes through these barriers until the tide fell. For much of the morning, Germans in fortified resistance nests directed a withering fire on to flights of LCAs touching down on the beach, which added to the troubles of the assault units. At approximately 09:50, approaching the shore side town of Asnelles, five of the LCAs transporting No.47 Royal Marine Commando ashore blew up mines or were wrecked on beach obstacles with the loss of more than a fifth of the Commando before they reached the beach.

===== Juno Beach =====
On Juno Beach, RCN, RN, and RM flotillas employed 142 LCAs and experienced some difficulty getting the units of the 3rd Canadian Infantry Division to shore. Earlier, ten minutes had been lost to delays during the passage of Task Force J from Southampton. The I Corps planners had scheduled the landing on Nan, the eastern sector of Juno, at 07:45, 20 minutes later than on Mike, the western sector. The planners considered that Nan landing craft would require higher water to navigate among what aerial photographs suggested were underwater rocks, but later discovered that this threat had been much overestimated and that much of the shoal was actually floating seaweed. At any rate, the shallow draft of the LCAs managed the transit without trouble from the shoals, but other deeper draft landing craft types were at risk. The water had risen fast in the strong north-westerly wind. When LCA carrying assault infantry approached the beach, the crews discovered that the tide was running too high for demolition personnel to clear lanes through the beach obstacles (Demolition personnel on Juno used four LCA(OC)s, Obstacle Clearance). Consequently, landing craft had to disembark their troops among the obstacles or smash through them.

===== Utah Beach =====
Two little islands off Utah Beach presented a potential threat to the invasion forces and became the first French territory liberated by seaborne Allied soldiers on D-Day. At 04:30, four LCAs of 552 Flotilla landed detachments of the US 4th and 24th Cavalry Squadrons on the Îles Saint-Marcouf. From a navigation perspective this operation presented acute challenges; locating two tiny islets in darkness while weaving through unmarked minefields to touch down on rocky shores. These LCAs came from SS Empire Gauntlet, the landing ship whose LCAs also delivered the initial wave of the 1st Battalion, 8th Infantry, US 4th Division, the westernmost seaborne landing of D-Day.

==== Dragoon landings ====
The sturdiness and quietness of the LCA proved invaluable during Operation Dragoon, the invasion of southern France in July 1944. Operation Romeo had LCAs of the RCN disembark the 1^{er} Commando Français de l'Afrique du Nord to disable German artillery atop the cliffs of Cap Nègre. Canadian LCAs also landed the U.S.-Canadian 1st Special Service Force on the difficult, sharp-rocked shores of Île du Levant in a pre-dawn operation to silence batteries there that threatened the main force. The LCA was a strong little craft, in this instance standing up better to the pounding in rough landings than other LC types, especially on these rocky offshore islands, when many LCVPs were lost. Following the landings in southern France, the RN's LSI units remained in the Mediterranean or began moving to the Indian Ocean in anticipation of joining the war against Japan.

==== Walcheren and the Scheldt estuary ====
There was one more notable use of LCAs in the war in northwestern Europe: the fierce fighting around Walcheren Island and the Western Scheldt (Battle of the Scheldt). Though by mid-September 1944, most amphibious assets had been sent to the Mediterranean for Dragoon, the Royal Navy still had 70 LCAs in Portsmouth. Because the approaches precluded the use of destroyers to support the assault, the presence of LCSs and other support craft was vital in providing covering fire and warding off German craft. The low speed of the LCA made the navigation plans and timing of the infantry assault more challenging due to the Scheldt's 4 and 5-knot (9.3 km/h) currents. Still, No. 4 Commando got ashore from the bullet-proof LCA under heavy fire with only two or three casualties. The LCA containing the heavier equipment was sunk by an anti-invasion obstacle. Two hours later, the 5th King's Own Scottish Borderers were also landed from LCAs at Flushing. During the balance of the operations around Walcheren, LCAs were used to ferry troops through the river network and the extensive flooded areas.

== Postwar ==
Perhaps 1,500 LCAs survived the war in serviceable condition. But many of these LCAs were discarded, as when the LSI HMS Persimmon, returning to Britain from the Far East in 1946, dumped her lower deck LCAs overboard to lighten ship and make better speed. Many LCAs used in the Far East were not sent back to the United Kingdom. Damaged LCAs, along with other damaged landing craft, were sunk rather than repaired. In Cochin, India, at the shore establishment HMS Chinkara (home of the Landing Craft Storage, Section 21), many LCA were towed out to the 10 fathom mark and sunk by various means from axe to Bofors gun fire. In home waters, the end of the war meant the merchant ships and passenger liners that had served as LSIs were returned to their owners and refitted to civilian trim. This left an LCA surfeit that was sold off for civilian uses. They were popular acquisitions among riparian holiday-makers and canal enthusiasts in Britain. Their holds covered and ramps sealed, LCAs became charming little houseboats. After the Second World War the Royal Netherlands Navy also acquired 22 LCAs that were all built in 1944.

Peace brought difficult challenges to Britain's armed forces and the LCA was to suffer because of understandable changes in material requirements. Most landing craft crews had been hostilities only and reserve personnel who now returned to civilian life. Career minded personnel remaining in the service naturally gravitated toward larger ships; so amphibious warfare decayed. In addition, questions emerged about the feasibility of amphibious warfare in the shadow of the atomic bomb just as, between the wars, the advent of aircraft had been used as a reason not to develop amphibious capabilities. One source reports 286 LCAs on Royal Navy books in 1947. In 1949, Admiral Maund lamented the scrapping of so many landing craft. Following the war, all active LCAs were crewed by the Royal Marines who were given the responsibility for all landing craft and raiding in the post-war British armed forces. Flotillas were retained in Royal Marine service through the 1960s.

=== The Suez Crisis ===
The Suez Crisis in 1956 caused a scramble for available LCAs. A few were serviceable in the Amphibious Warfare Squadron stationed in Malta. Twenty LCAs were pulled out of storage at Gareloch, in Scotland, and returned to fighting trim in Greenock.

At 06:45 on 6 November, LCAs landing Nos. 40 and 42 Commando touched down at Port Said. The water here was particularly shallow as the beach shelved gently and the Commandos, having to wade through such a wide water gap, were perhaps fortunate that LVT amphibians also participated in the landing. Still, the LCA crews had done exactly what was required of them - landing the assault force on target and on time. The weather and sea conditions had cooperated; north-easterly winds blew up over the next eight hours that would have made the landing less accurate (and by the next morning impossible).

Although the commandos' initial assault had been seaborne, their follow on build-up arrived by Westland Whirlwind helicopter. The great success of this, the first helicopter-borne assault, signalled the close of the assault landing craft era. As amphibians became more seaworthy and helicopters had demonstrated the ability to fly over fixed beach defences, the day of landing craft as initial assault transport was seen to have passed.

=== Indochina ===
As France began repossession of its southeast Asian colonies after the war, the need for amphibious craft became apparent. In 1946, France acquired 26 LCA and other landing craft from the Royal Navy supply at Singapore. They were, "well liked for their armour protection and relatively silent engines, slow speed and lack of endurance were their main drawbacks." These craft were fitted with overhead canvas covers, which provided the crews some respite from the tropical rain and sun. They were armed with various weapons, mostly 12.7mm heavy machine guns (mounted to face aft) and .303 Lewis guns; these latter were replaced by more modern weapons as they became available. The LCAs were used as patrol and assault craft until 1951. The French Army and Navy created a number of river flotillas - sailors operated the craft and soldiers manned the weapons - and in 1947 these flotillas were designated as Divisions Navales d'Assaut. Two LCS(M)s were used in 1946–47 in Indochina. These arrived unarmed, but improvised mounts enabled twin 7.62mm machine guns to be carried in the turrets. Also, an 81mm mortar was installed in each craft. Fittingly perhaps, considering that French troops were the first transported into enemy fire by LCAs in 1940, these boats were the last LCAs to be recorded in combat service.

=== Final years in service ===
The first amphibious craft of the Navy of the Federal Republic of Germany were 10 LCAs obtained from Britain in October 1958. These boats were viewed as well built by the German Navy, and were fitted with a machine-gun and carried 25 soldiers. Though well regarded, they were small for the tactical plans of the time and sometime about 1967 they were retired.

Perhaps the last operational use of LCAs by the Royal Navy was in 1967 when boats from HMS Albion supported operations in Aden; an LCA being the last craft to carry British personnel away from Aden.

== See also ==
- LCPL
- LCM (1)
- LCM (2)
- Landing Craft Vehicle Personnel
- Landing Craft Mechanized
- Landing Ship, Infantry
