= Assaf Gavron =

Israeli writer and novelist (born 1968)

- אסף גברון
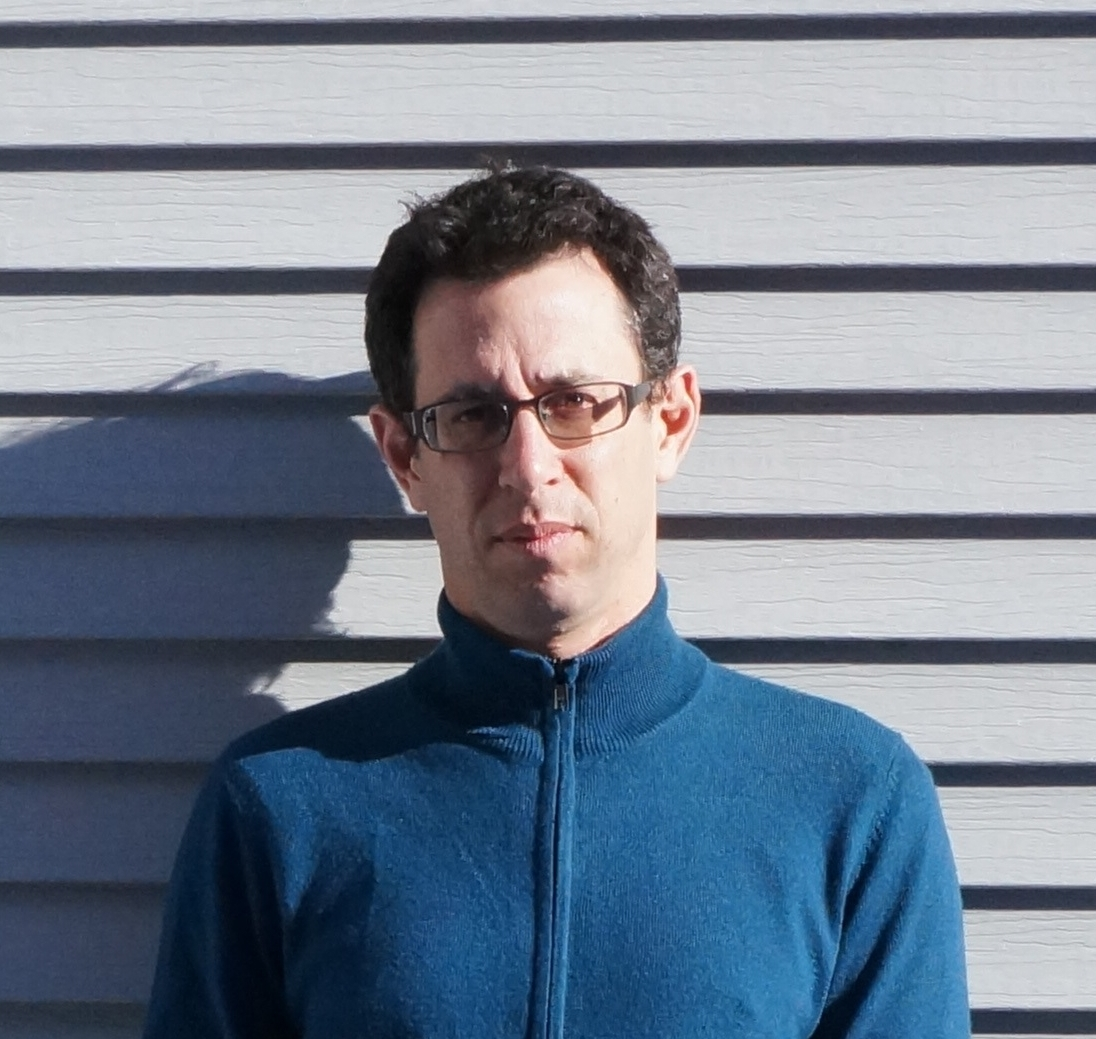
- Gavron in 2014
- Born: December 21, 1968 (age 57); Arad, Israel
- Education: Goldsmiths' College, London, UK
- Occupations: Writer, novelist, translator, musician
- Awards: Bernstein Prize (2013), Israeli Prime Minister Award for authors (2011)
- Website: Official website

Assaf Gavron (Hebrew: אסף גברון; born 21 December 1968) is an Israeli writer, novelist, translator, and musician. Formerly a journalist and hi-tech worker, his books have been translated to several languages and won awards such as the Bernstein Prize for The Hilltop (2013), Prix Courrier International (France) for Croc Attack (2012), "Ein Buch für die Stadt" (Cologne, Germany) for the same novel (2012), and the Israeli Prime Minister Award for authors (2011).

== Early life and career ==
Gavron was born in the town of Arad in 1968 and grew up in Motza Illit near Jerusalem. He earned a Bachelor of Arts (BA) in Media and Communication in Goldsmiths' College in London (1991–1994) and New Media in Vancouver (1997). In the 1990s, he worked as a journalist for several Israeli newspapers. Between 2000 and 2004, he was a creative director for Israeli high-tech company Valis. He has been teaching creative writing in Israel (Bar-Ilan University in Ramat Gan, the Sam Spiegel Film and Television School in Jerusalem, and Sapir Academic College in Sderot) and the United States (University of Nebraska Omaha and San Diego State University). Gavron has worked creating video games and as a rock musician; he has also translated American novels into Hebrew.

== Other activities ==
Apart from his original works, Gavron is a literary translator from English to Hebrew. Among the more than twenty books he translated are J. D. Salinger's Nine Stories, Philip Roth's Portnoy's Complaint, Jonathan Safran Foer's Everything is Illuminated, J. K. Rowling's The Casual Vacancy, and Audrey Niffenegger's The Time Traveler's Wife. Gavron is the singer and songwriter with Israeli cult pop band The Mouth and Foot (הפה והטלפיים), which has released five albums between 1989 and 2013. He is the founder and captain of the Israeli Writers Football national team. He was the chief writer of video game Peacemaker.

== Personal life ==
Gavron lives in Tel Aviv. He is divorced and has two daughters.

== Awards and accolades ==
- The Hilltop won the Israeli Bernstein Prize (2013) and was long listed for the Sapir Prize (2014).
- CrocAttack won the Courrier International Prix in France (2013) and the "Buch für die Stadt" prize in Cologne, Germany (2012). It was short listed for the Adei-Wizo Prize in Italy (2010) and long listed for the Dayton Literary Peace Prize in the US (2011).
- Hydromania won the Wizo Prize in the Netherlands (2012) and the Geffen Award in Israel (2009).
- 2010: DAAD artists-in-Berlin fellowship.
- 2011: Israeli Prime Minister Award for Authors

== Works ==
- Ice (אייס): novel, Tel Aviv: Gvanim, 1997.
- Sex in the Cemetery (מין בבית העלמין): story collection, Tel Aviv: Zmora-Bitan, 2000.
- Moving (מובינג): novel, Or Yehuda: Zmora-Bitan Publishing, 2003. (German: Alles Paletti, Luchterhand Literaturverlag, 2010)
- CrocAttack (תנין פיגוע): novel, Or Yehuda: Kinneret Zmora-Bitan, 2006. (German: Ein schönes Attentat, Luchterhand Verlag, 2008; Dutch: Krokodil van de aanslagen, Ailantus, 2009; Italian: La mia storia, la tua storia, Mondadori, 2009; French: Croc Attack, Rivages, 2010; English (UK): CrocAttack, 4th Estate, 2010; English (US): Almost Dead, HarperCollins, 2010; English (Canada): Almost Dead, Harper Canada, 2010; Greek: Croc Attack, Bartzolulianos, 2013; Bulgarian: Almost Dead, Enthusiast, 2014)
- Hydromania (הידרומניה): novel, Or Yehuda: Kinneret Zmora-Bitan, 2008. (German: Hydromania, Luchterhand Verlag, 2009; Dutch: Hydromania, Ailantus, 2010; Italian: Idromania, La Giuntina, 2013)
- Eating Standing Up (אוכל בעמידה): collection of journalism, Jerusalem: Uganda, 2009.
- The Hilltop (הגבעה): novel, Tel Aviv: Books in the Attic (Sifrey Aliyat Hagag), 2013. (German: Auf fremdem Land, Luchterhand Verlag, 2013; Dutch: De Nederzetting, Nieuw Amsterdam, 2014; French: Les Innocents, Rivages, 2014; Italian: La Colina, La Giuntina, 2014; English (US): The Hilltop, Scribner, 2014; English (UK): The Hilltop, One World, 2014; Swedish: Uppe på höjden, Natur & Kultur, 2015; Czech: Osada na pahorku, Pistorius & Olšanská, 2017).
- Eighteen Lashes (שמונה-עשרה מלקות), Books in the Attic (Sifrey Aliyat Hagag), 2017. (German: Achtzehn Hiebe, Luchterhand Verlag, 2018; Italian: Le diciotto frustate, La Giuntina, 2019).
- The Cement (הַמֶּלֶט), Pardes Publishing, 2023.
- Don't You Want Me (האם אינך רוצה בי), Books in the Attic (Sifrey Aliyat Hagag), 2025.
