= The Hilltop (novel) =

2013 novel by Assaf Gavron

The Hilltop הגבעה
- First edition (publ. ספרי עליית הגג ספרי עלית הגג)
- Author: Assaf Gavron
- Language: Hebrew
- Publication date: 2013
- ISBN: 978-9-655-45649-3

The Hilltop (Hebrew: הגבעה, Ha-Giv'ah) is a 2013 Israeli novel by Assaf Gavron. The novel was "an Israeli best-seller and prize-winner."

The Hilltop is set in an Israeli Jewish settlement in the West Bank. It was published in Israel in 2013 and in late 2014 in an English translation by Steven Cohen.

Adam Kirsch calls it "a great Israeli novel", praising Gavron for his contemporary voice. In The Wall Street Journal, Sam Sacks described The Hilltop as, describing "superbly orchestrated chaos" making it, "an indispensable novel of... the 'Wild West Bank.'"

== Awards and accolades ==
- The Hilltop won the Israeli Bernstein Prize (2013) and was long listed for the Sapir Prize (2014).
