= Bernstein Prize =

Israeli literary award

- Awarded for: Awarded for literary works of young Hebrew writer
- Country: Israel
- Presented by: The Bernstein Foundation, managed by the Book Publishers Association of Israel
- First award: 1978; 48 years ago

The Bernstein Prize (Hebrew: פרס ברנשטיין) is an annual Israeli literary award for writers 50 years of age and younger. The prize is awarded by the Bernstein Foundation, named after Mordechai Bernstein, who left money in his estate to establish a foundation in order to encourage young Hebrew writers. The foundation is managed by Book Publishers Association of Israel.

The prize has been awarded since 1978 to writers in following four categories:

- Original Hebrew-language novel (presented every year – 50,000 shekel prize).
- Book of original Hebrew-language poetry (presented every two years – 25,000 shekel prize).
- Book of original Hebrew-language for children and for young adults.
- Original Hebrew-language play (presented every two years – 25,000 shekel prize).
- Literary criticism (presented every two years – 15,000 shekel prize).

For each category there are separate professional committees to determine the winners.

The prize awards are the second largest prize purses in literature in Israel, exceeded only by the Sapir Prize.

== Winners ==
- 1981: Dorit Orgad
- 2009: Ronit Matalon won the prize for best original Hebrew novel, for her book Kol Tsa'adenu (The Sound of our Steps).
- 2011: Sayed Kashua won the award for best original Hebrew novel, for his book Second Person Singular
- 2013: Assaf Gavron for his novel The Hilltop
- 2015: Roy Hasan
- 2015: Dorit Rabinyan for the novel Gader Hayah (English: All the Rivers, originally titled Borderlife)
- 2016: Yishai Sarid on his book The Third.
- 2017: Yaara Shachori on her book Aquarium.
- 2022: Carmit Sakhar on her book Torat HaKvutzot (English: Set Theory).
- 2023: Oshrat Assayag-Lopez on her book Al Mishkavi BaLaylot (English: Upon My Bed at Nights).
- 2024: Meira Weiss on her book Mischakim Mesukanim (English: Dangerous Games).
- 2025: Elad Wingard on his book HaMachsom (English: The Checkpoint).
