= Dorit Rabinyan =

Israeli writer and screenwriter

- דורית רביניאן
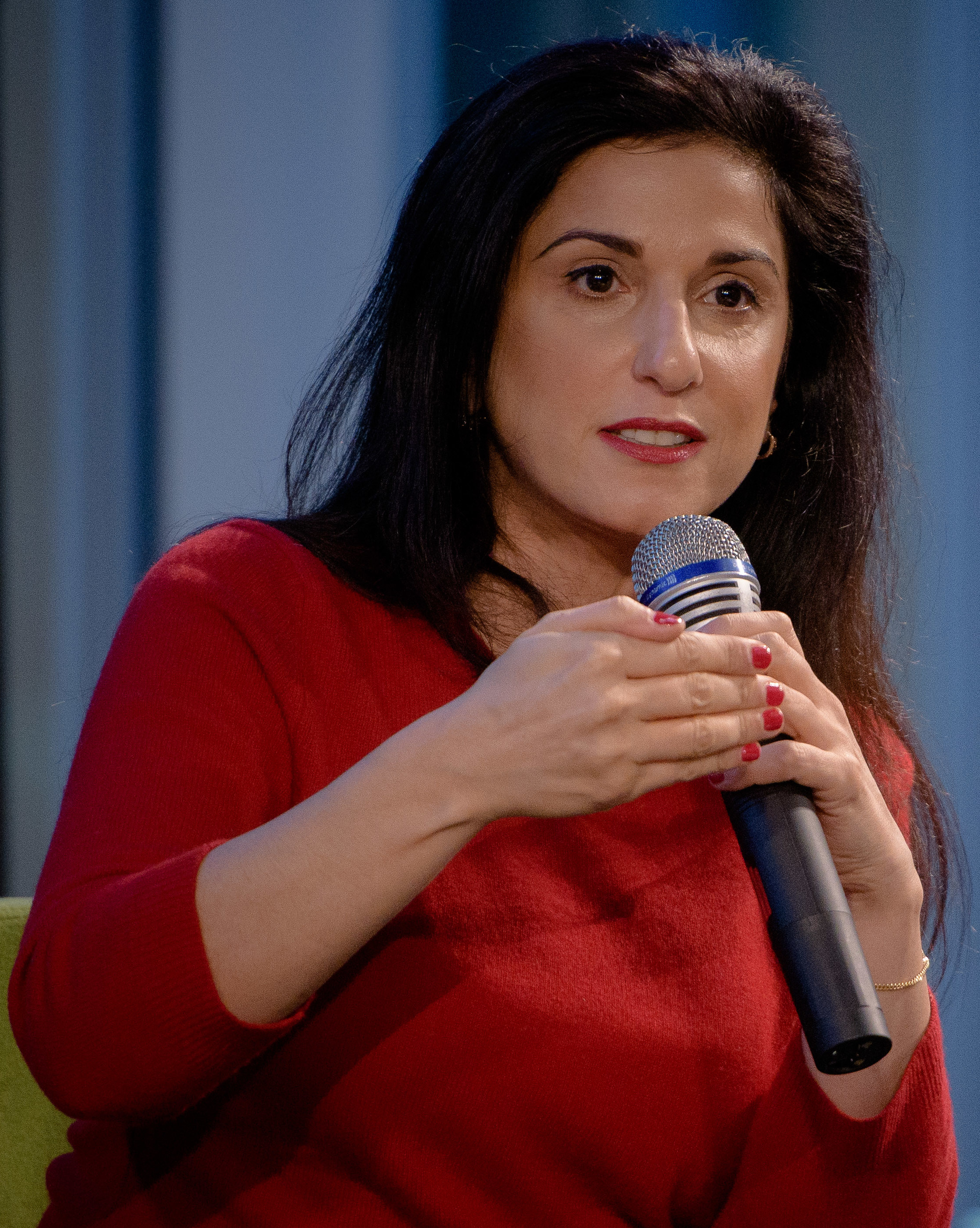
- Born: September 25, 1972 (age 54); Kfar Saba, Israel
- Citizenship: Israeli
- Writing career
- Language: Hebrew

Dorit Rabinyan (Hebrew: דורית רביניאן; born 25 September 1972) is an Israeli novelist and screenwriter known for Persian Brides (1995), Our Weddings (1999; also published as Strand of a Thousand Pearls) and All the Rivers (Hebrew: Gader Haya, 2014). Her literary awards include the Jewish Quarterly-Wingate Prize for Persian Brides and the Bernstein Prize for All the Rivers. In 2015, All the Rivers, which depicts a romance between an Israeli woman and a Palestinian man, became the subject of controversy after Israel's Ministry of Education declined to include it in a high-school literature curriculum. The decision attracted international attention and prompted debate about literature, national identity and the Israeli–Palestinian conflict.

== Biography ==
Dorit Rabinyan was born in Kfar Saba, Israel, to an Iranian-Jewish family. Her father, Zion, owned a textile factory in Tel Aviv. She has published four novels, two of which have been widely translated. She has also published a poetry collection and three illustrated children's books. Rabinian wrote the screenplay for the film "Shuli's Boy," which won the Israeli Film Academy Award in 1997. Her first novel, Persian Brides, won the Jewish Quarterly-Wingate Prize in 1999.

She was a close friend of Palestinian artist Hasan Hourani, and wrote a eulogy for him in The Guardian after his death in 2003.

Her 2014 novel, All the Rivers, originally published in English as Borderlife in English (Heb. Gader Haya), which tells a love story between an Israeli woman and a Palestinian man and semi-biographical, has become the center of controversy. The novel was well-received and won the Bernstein Prize. In 2015, a committee of teachers requested Borderlife be added to the recommended curriculum for Hebrew high school literature classes.

A committee in the Israeli Ministry of Education found the book inappropriate and declined to add it, on the grounds, according to The Economist, that it promotes intermarriage and assimilation. Dalia Fenig, the leading committee member, argued that the book "could do more harm than good" at this time of heightened tensions, though she noted the book was not banned and could be added next year. The decision led to protests from high school teachers and principals and opposition politician Isaac Herzog. Sales of the book surged in the aftermath of the ban.

Rabinyan appeared on reality TV show MasterChef VIP in 2015.

Rabinyan has received the Prime Minister's Prize for Hebrew Literary Works.

== Books ==
=== Novels ===
- Persian Brides (1995; Hebrew: סמטת השקדיות בעומריג'אן)
- Our Weddings (1999; Hebrew: החתונות שלנו; also published in English as The Strand of a Thousand Pearls)
- All the Rivers (2014; Hebrew: גדר חיה; also published in English as Borderlife)
- Nine Singing Lessons (2025; Hebrew: שיעורים בפיתוח קול)

=== Children's books ===
- And Where Was I? (2006; Hebrew: אז איפה הייתי אני?)
- The Homes Swap (2017; Hebrew: חתולה וארנבון מחליפים בתים)
- The She-Cloud (2019; Hebrew: העננה רננה)
