= No. 7 Commando =

Commando unit of the British army during World War II

- Active: 1940–1941
- Country: United Kingdom
- Branch: British Army
- Type: Commando
- Role: Raiding
- Size: ~ 500 officers and men
- Part of: Layforce
- Engagements: Second World War: Raid on Bardia; Battle of Crete

Insignia
- Combined Operations Shoulder Patch

No. 7 Commando was a unit of the British Commandos and part of the British Army during the Second World War. The commando was formed in August 1940 in the United Kingdom. No. 7 Commando was transferred to the Middle East as part of Layforce. Committed to the Battle of Crete, it suffered heavy casualties, after which it was disbanded.

== Background ==
The commandos were formed in 1940, by the order of Winston Churchill the British prime minister. He called for specially trained troops that would "develop a reign of terror down the enemy coast". At first they were a small force of volunteers who carried out small raids against enemy occupied territory, but by 1943 their role had changed into lightly equipped assault Infantry which specialised in spearheading amphibious landings.

The man initially selected as the overall commander of the force was Admiral Sir Roger Keyes himself a veteran of the landings at Galipoli and the Zeebrugge raid in the First World War. Keyes resigned in October 1941 and was replaced by Admiral Louis Mountbatten.

By the autumn of 1940 more than 2,000 men had volunteered for commando training, and what became known as the Special Service Brigade was formed into 12 units called commandos. Each commando would number around 450 men commanded by a lieutenant colonel. They were sub divided into troops of 75 men and further divided into 15-man sections. Commandos were all volunteers seconded from other British Army regiments and retained their own cap badges and remained on their regimental roll for pay. All volunteers went through the six-week intensive commando course at Achnacarry. The course in the Scottish Highlands concentrated on fitness, speed marches, weapons training, map reading, climbing, small boat operations and demolitions both by day and by night.

== History ==
No. 7 Commando was formed in Felixstowe in July 1940 and in October 1940 were sent to Scotland for boat training. They were then re-designated 3rd Special Service Battalion on 24 October 1940 and sent to the Middle East on the 31st January 1941. On arrival in Alexandria they were assigned to Layforce – a commando formation commanded by Robert Laycock – as 'A' Battalion.

Their first planned operation was the invasion of Rhodes, which was later cancelled. This was followed by the Raid on Bardia on 19 April 1941, which was a fiasco later publicised by Evelyn Waugh. They were next sent to take part in the Battle of Crete, assisting in the evacuation of the Allied forces who were subjected to aerial bombardment by German forces, most of the men of the commando were taken prisoner. After Crete the commando was disbanded and its personnel sent to other commando units in the theatre or returned to their previous units.

== Battle honours ==
The following Battle honours were awarded to the British Commandos during the Second World War.

- Adriatic
- Alethangyaw
- Aller
- Anzio
- Argenta Gap
- Burma 1943–45
- Crete
- Dieppe
- Dives Crossing
- Djebel Choucha
- Flushing
- Greece 1944–45
- Italy 1943–45
- Kangaw
- Landing at Porto San Venere
- Landing in Sicily
- Leese
- Litani
- Madagascar
- Middle East 1941, 1942, 1944
- Monte Ornito
- Myebon
- Normandy Landing
- North Africa 1941–43
- North-West Europe 1942, 1944–1945
- Norway 1941
- Pursuit to Messina
- Rhine
- St. Nazaire
- Salerno
- Sedjenane 1
- Sicily 1943
- Steamroller Farm
- Syria 1941
- Termoli
- Vaagso
- Valli di Comacchio
- Westkapelle
