= All the Rivers =

2014 novel by Dorit Rabinyan

Gader Chaya
- First edition (Hebrew)
- Author: Dorit Rabinyan
- Language: Hebrew
- Published: 2014
- Publisher: Am Oved
- Publication place: Israel
- Pages: 344

All the Rivers (initially referred to as Borderlife; Hebrew: גדר חיה Gader Chaya, literally: "Hedgerow") is a 2014 novel written by Israeli author Dorit Rabinyan, published by Am Oved in May 2014. The book's English-language edition was translated by Jessica Cohen and published by Random House in the United States and by Serpent's Tail in the United Kingdom, both in 2017. It is considered a controversial book in Israel.

The novel was a winner of the Bernstein Prize for young writers, an Israeli award for Hebrew literature.

== Plot ==
The novel, which is set in New York City, chronicles a love affair between Hilmi, a Palestinian artist, and Liat, a Jewish Israeli translator. The two eventually separate, with the man going to Ramallah and the woman going to Tel Aviv.

== Controversy ==
It became controversial in Israel after being disqualified from Israeli high school curricula for its subject matter of a love story between a Jewish-Israeli woman and a Palestinian man who's of Muslim-Arab background. The novel topped bestseller lists once it was rejected by the Israel Education Ministry. The controversy led to pro-book protests from high school teachers and principals to the Knesset Opposition head, Zionist Union leader Isaac Herzog. This controversy led to a doubling in the book's sales; some people even "bought multiple copies and posted photos of themselves holding the book in bookstores," according to The New York Times. Shortly afterward the Ministry stated that the novel may be taught only in advanced literature classes.

Besides the objections to the plot's interracial relationship, the book has been controversial due to claims by the then Education Minister Naftali Bennet that the book represented Israel Defense Forces troops as sadists. It has been criticized for its encouragement of illegal drug use. In addition, it was reported for calling the State of Israel an "Occupier", while its soldiers are compared to Hamas".

== Film adaptation ==
In December 2019, a film adaptation of the novel was announced to be in production by Gal Gadot and Keshet International.
