= Amphibious warfare =

Military operation attacking from air and sea to land

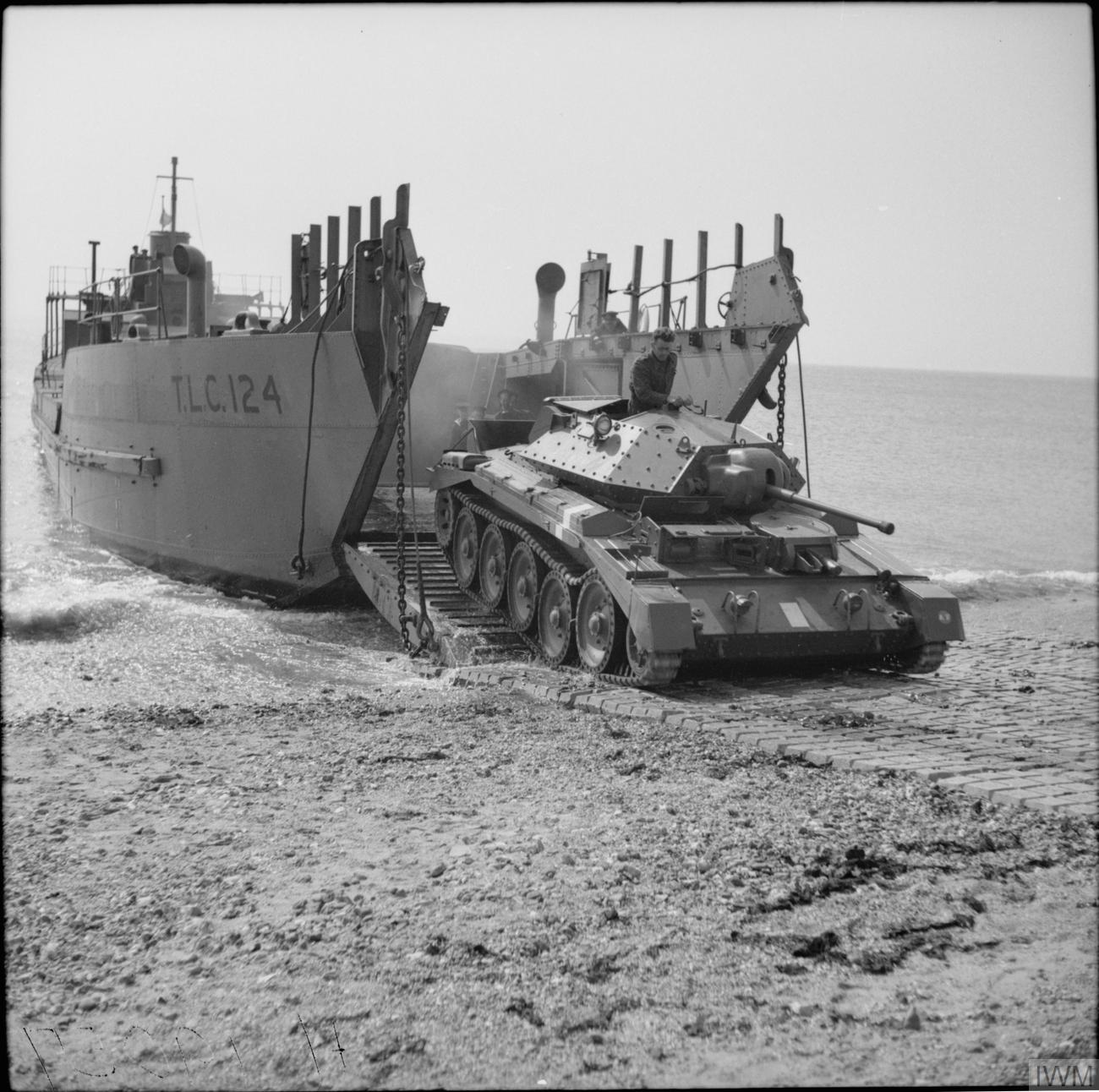
A Crusader tank landing on a beach from a Tank Landing Craft in a 1942 test

Amphibious warfare is a type of offensive military operation that today uses naval ships to project ground and air power onto a hostile or potentially hostile shore at a designated landing beach. Through history the operations were conducted using ship's boats as the primary method of delivering troops to shore. Since the Gallipoli Campaign, specialised watercraft were increasingly designed for landing troops, material, and vehicles, including by landing craft and for insertion of commandos, by fast patrol boats, zodiacs (rigid inflatable boats) and from mini-submersibles. The term amphibious first emerged in the United Kingdom and the United States during the 1930s with introduction of vehicles such as Vickers-Carden-Loyd Light Amphibious Tank or the Landing Vehicle Tracked. (Note: The first LVT prototypes were named Alligator and Crocodile, though neither species is actual amphibian)

Amphibious warfare includes operations defined by their type, purpose, scale and means of execution. In the British Empire at the time these were called combined operations which were defined as "...operations where naval, military or air forces in any combination are co-operating with each other, working independently under their respective commanders, but with a common strategic object." All armed forces that employ troops with special training and equipment for conducting landings from naval vessels to shore agree to this definition. Since the 20th century, an amphibious landing of troops on a beachhead is acknowledged as the most complex of all military maneuvers. The undertaking requires an intricate coordination of numerous military specialties, including air power, naval gunfire, naval transport, logistical planning, specialized equipment, land warfare, tactics, and extensive training in the nuances of this maneuver for all personnel involved.

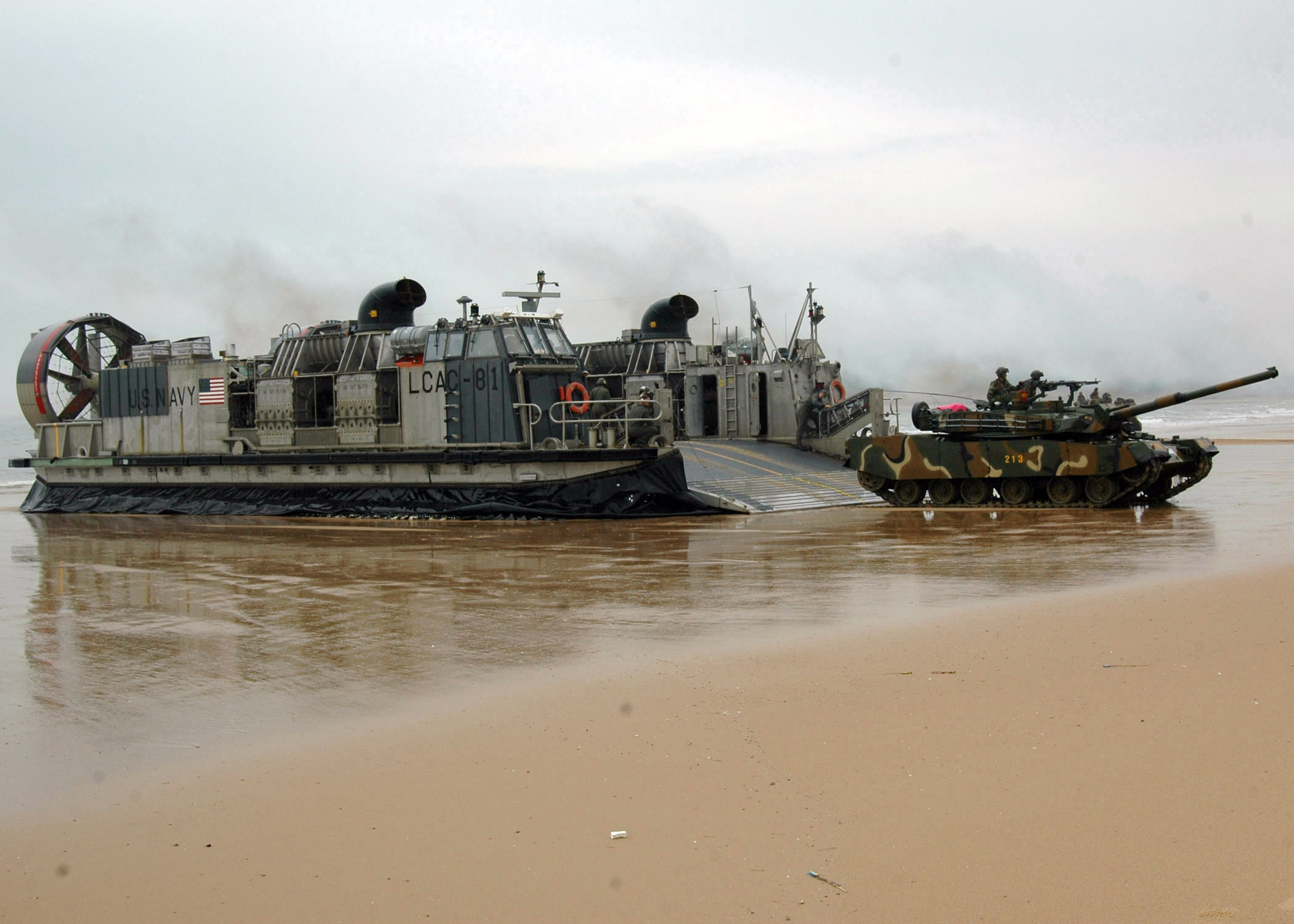
South Korean Type 88 K1 MBT comes ashore from an American LCAC in March 2007.

In essence, amphibious operations consist of the phases of strategic planning and preparation, operational transit to the intended theatre of operations, pre-landing rehearsal and disembarkation, troop landings, beachhead consolidation and conducting inland ground and air operations. Historically, within the scope of these phases a vital part of success was often based on the military logistics, naval gunfire and close air support. Another factor is the variety and quantity of specialised vehicles and equipment used by the landing force that are designed for the specific needs of this type of operation. Amphibious operations can be classified as tactical or operational raids such as the Dieppe Raid, operational landings in support of a larger land strategy such as the Kerch–Eltigen Operation, and a strategic opening of a new Theatre of Operations, for example the Operation Avalanche. The purpose of amphibious operations is usually offensive, except in cases of amphibious withdrawals, but is limited by the plan and terrain. Landings on islands less than 5,000 km^{2} (1,900 sq mi) in size are tactical, usually with the limited objectives of neutralising enemy defenders and obtaining a new base of operation. Such an operation may be prepared and planned in days or weeks, and would employ a naval task force to land less than a division of troops.

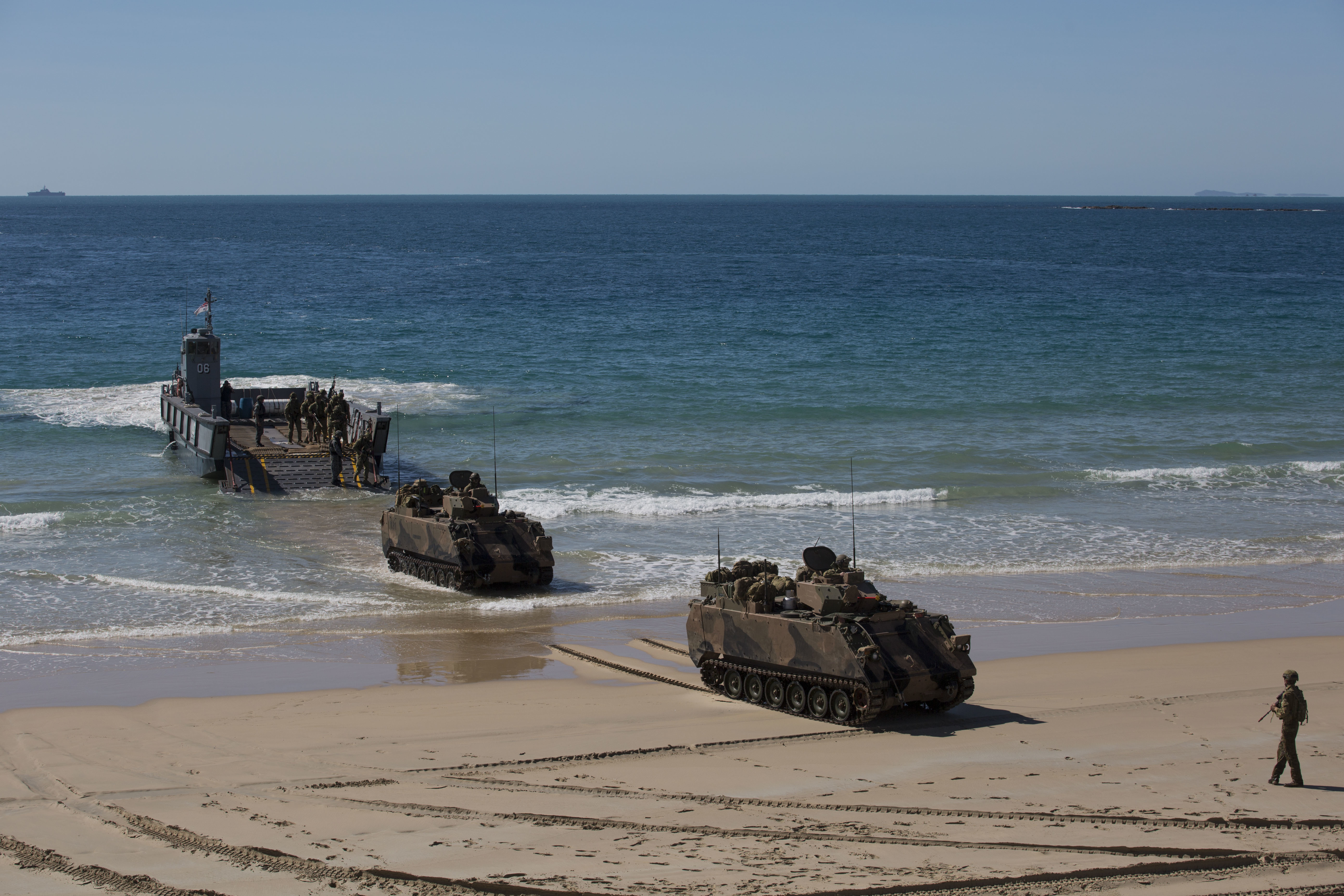
Two Australian M113s disembarking from a landing craft during a training exercise in 2019

The intent of operational landings is usually to exploit the shore as a vulnerability in the enemy's overall position, forcing redeployment of forces, premature use of reserves, and aiding a larger allied offensive effort elsewhere. Such an operation requiring weeks to months of preparation and planning, would use multiple task forces, or even a naval fleet to land corps-size forces, including on large islands, for example Operation Chromite. A strategic landing operation requires a major commitment of forces to invade a national territory in the archipelagic, such as the Battle of Leyte, or continental, such as Operation Neptune. Such an operation may require multiple naval and air fleets to support the landings, and extensive intelligence gathering and planning of over a year. Although most amphibious operations are thought of primarily as beach landings, they can exploit available shore infrastructure to land troops directly into an urban environment if unopposed. In this case non-specialised ships can offload troops, vehicles and cargo using organic or facility wharf-side equipment. Tactical landings in the past have utilised small boats, small craft, small ships and civilian vessels converted for the mission to deliver troops to the water's edge.

== Preparation and planning ==
A naval landing operation requires vessels to troops and equipment and might include amphibious reconnaissance. Military intelligence services obtain information on the opponent. Amphibious warfare goes back to ancient times. The Sea Peoples menaced the Egyptians from the reign of Akhenaten as captured on the reliefs at Medinet Habu and Karnak. The Hellenic city states routinely resorted to amphibious assaults upon each other's shores, which they reflected upon in their plays and other art. The landing at Marathon by the Persians on 9 September 490 BC was the largest amphibious operation until the landings at the Battle of Gallipoli.

== Marines ==
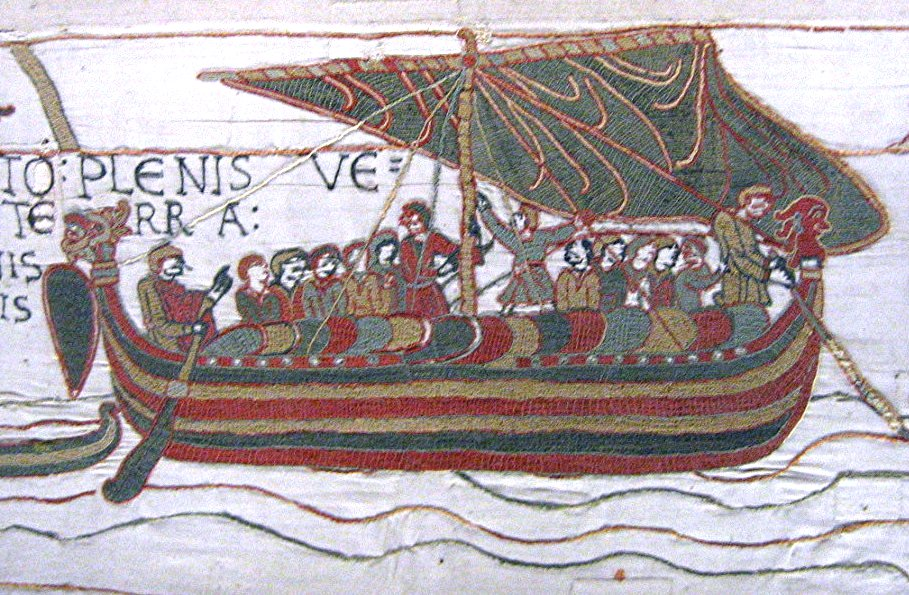
The Bayeux Tapestry depicts the 1066 Norman invasion of England with a force of some 8,000 infantry and heavy cavalry landed on the English shore.

In 1537 Charles V, Holy Roman Emperor and King of Spain, decided to train and assign amphibious-assault skilled units to the Royal Armada specifically for fighting on and from ships. The Spanish Marines were born under the name Compañías Viejas del Mar de Nápoles ("All-Spanish Sea Companies of Naples"). The idea was to set up a permanent assignation of land troops to the Royal Spanish Navy that would be available for the Crown.

The first "professional" marine units were already task-trained amphibious troops, but instead of being disbanded, they were kept for the Spanish Crown's needs. Their first actions took place all along the Mediterranean Sea, where the Turks and pirate settlements were risks for commerce and navigation: Algiers, Malta and Gelves.

In 1565, the island of Malta was invaded by the Ottoman Turks during the Great Siege of Malta, forcing its defenders to retreat to the fortified cities. A strategic choke point in the Mediterranean Sea, its loss would have been so menacing for the kingdoms of Western Europe that forces were urgently raised to relieve the island. It took four months to train, arm and move a 5,500-man amphibious force to lift the siege.

Other countries adopted the idea and subsequently raised their own early marine forces as well.

== Development ==
From the 15th to the 20th centuries, several European countries established and expanded overseas colonies. Amphibious operations mostly aimed to settle colonies and to secure strong points along navigational routes. Amphibious forces were fully organized and devoted to this mission, although the troops not only fought ashore, but on board ships. By their nature amphibious assaults involve highly complex operations, demanding the coordination of disparate elements; when accomplished properly a paralyzing surprise to the enemy can be achieved. However, when there is a lack of preparation and/or coordination, often because of hubris, disastrous results can ensue.

=== Portuguese India ===
The Portuguese made usage of amphibious attacks during their campaigns in the Portuguese India, employing their naval advantage to compensate the relatively equality on land with the local forces. Afonso de Albuquerque achieved significant control over lands of the Indian Ocean by conquering ports like Goa, Hormuz and Malacca in operations from the sea. Governor João de Castro promoted to use amphibious attacks, based on swift landings and attacks, to spread terror and devastate coastal settlements, seeking to keep their enemy on their toes.

=== Ottoman-Habsburg wars ===
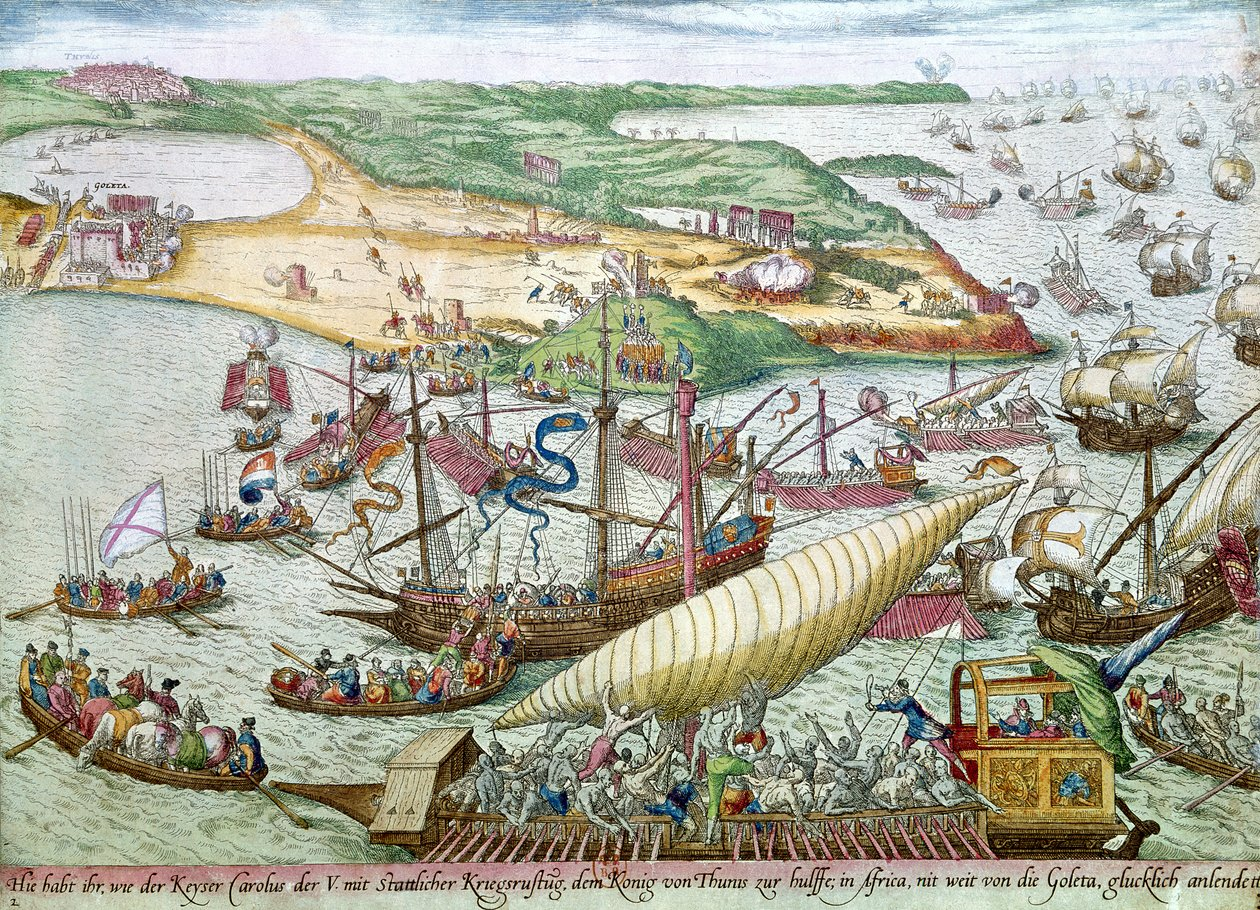
Conquest of Tunis of 1535.

During the Ottoman–Habsburg wars, all sides employed numerous and well-trained marine infantry and a combination of naval and land force. However, where Ottomans would favor disembarking their troops aside from their targets and initiating land attacks, Spanish and Genoese fleets made a breakthrough by investing in quick, direct disembarks protected by artillery, which often surprised their enemies. One of their poignant examples was that of the conquest of Coron in Morea in 1532, undertaken by their admiral Andrea Doria through direct assaults coupled with massive gunnery.

The 1535 conquest of Tunis by Emperor Charles V turned out one of the largest amphibious operations of the 16th century, involving both galleys and sailing ships, troops of many nationalities and newer siege techniques. The fleet, led by Andrea Doria and Alfonso d'Avalos, first captured the coastal fortress of La Goulette with the help of naval bombardments, resulting in the capture of Hayreddin Barbarossa's fleet in port. The fleet later transitioned into a land battle which led to the capture of the city of Tunis.

Doria and d'Avalos performed another such assault to relieve the Siege of Nice, surprising Barbarossa's French and Ottoman troops by bombarding the shore and landing the Spanish tercios directly. In contrast, during the amphibious assault on Mahdia by Doria and Bernardino de Mendoza, the Ottoman approach proved its obsolescence when Dragut landed a relief army away from the imperial position only to be cut short by their contravallation, ultimately failing to prevent the capture of the city.

=== Terceras Landing ===
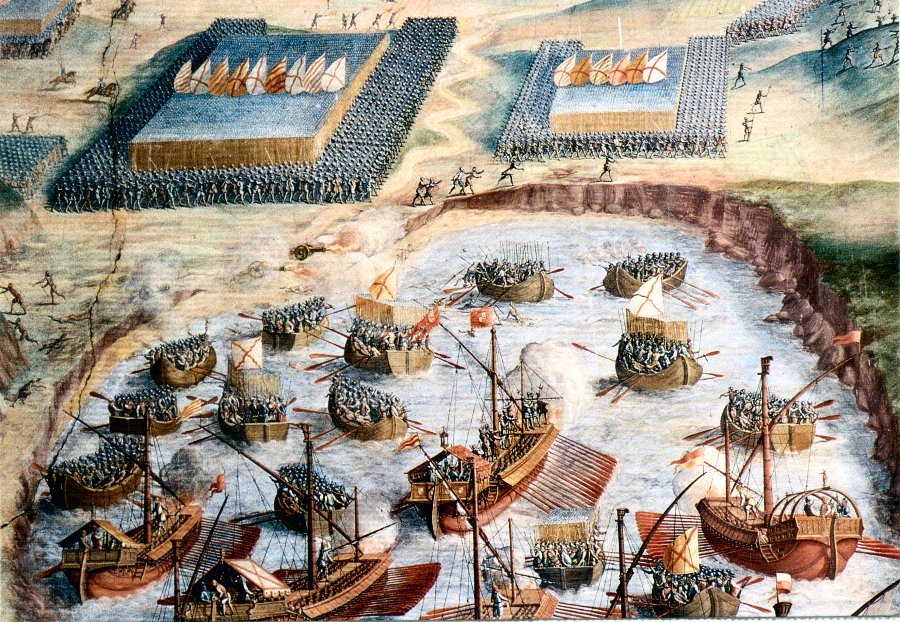
Terceras Landing.

Álvaro de Bazán, Marquis of Santa Cruz, was an early developer of amphibious warfare. The "Terceras Landing" in the Azores Islands on 25 May 1583, was a military feat as Bazán and the rest of commanders decided to make a fake landing to distract the defending forces (5,000 Portuguese, English and French soldiers). Special seagoing barges were also arranged as landing craft to unload cavalry horses and 700 artillery pieces on the beach; special rowing boats were armed with small cannons to support the landing boats, as well as galleys and galleasses; special supplies were readied to be unloaded and support the 11,000-man landing force strength. The total strength of the amphibious force was 15,000 men, including an armada of 90 ships. The operation resulted in complete victory.

=== Queen Anne's War ===
A superb example of successful combined operations, of both military branches and different imperial units, is the Siege of Port Royal (1710). The siege was a combined arms, British/Colonial American amphibious assault upon the Acadian Provincial capital Port-Royal (Acadia) of French Canada, during Queen Anne's War (the name of the American theater of the War of the Spanish Succession). The battle is known as the seminal moment in the conquest of Acadia. The siege resulted in the British imperial Force conquering French Arcadia and renaming Port Royal, Annapolis Royal.

=== The War of Jenkin's Ear ===
One famous instance of a failed amphibious assault was in 1741 at the Battle of Cartagena de Indias in New Granada, when a large British amphibious assault force commanded by Admiral Edward Vernon, and including a contingent of 200 Virginia "Marines"(not originally meant to be so) commanded by Lawrence Washington (older half brother of George Washington), failed to overcome a much smaller, but very heavily fortified Spanish defence force and were forced to retreat back to the ships and call off the operation.

=== King George's War ===
The Siege of Louisbourg (1745) took place in 1745 when a New England colonial force aided by a small British fleet captured Louisbourg, the capital of the French province of Île-Royale (present-day Cape Breton Island) during the War of the Austrian Succession, known as King George's War in the British colonies.

The northern British colonies regarded Louisbourg as a menacers, calling it the "American Dunkirk" due to its use as a base for privateers. There was regular, intermittent warfare between the French and the Wabanaki Confederacy on one side and the northern New England colonies on the other (See the Northeast Coast Campaigns of 1688, 1703, 1723, 1724). For the French, the Fortress of Louisbourg also protected the chief entrance to Canada, as well as the nearby French fisheries. The French government had spent 25 years in fortifying it, and the cost of its defenses was reckoned at thirty million livres. Although the fortress's construction and layout was acknowledged as having superior seaward defences, a series of low rises behind them made it vulnerable to a land attack. The low rises provided attackers places to erect siege batteries. The fort's garrison was poorly paid and supplied, and its inexperienced leaders mistrusted them. The colonial attackers were also lacking in experience, but ultimately succeeded in gaining control of the surrounding defences. The defenders surrendered in the face of an imminent assault.

Louisbourg was an important bargaining chip in the peace negotiations to end the war, since it represented a major British success. Factions within the British government were opposed to returning it to the French as part of any peace agreement, but these were eventually overruled, and Louisbourg was returned, over the objections of the victorious British North Americans, to French control after the 1748 Treaty of Aix-la-Chapelle, in return for French concessions elsewhere.

=== French and Indian War ===
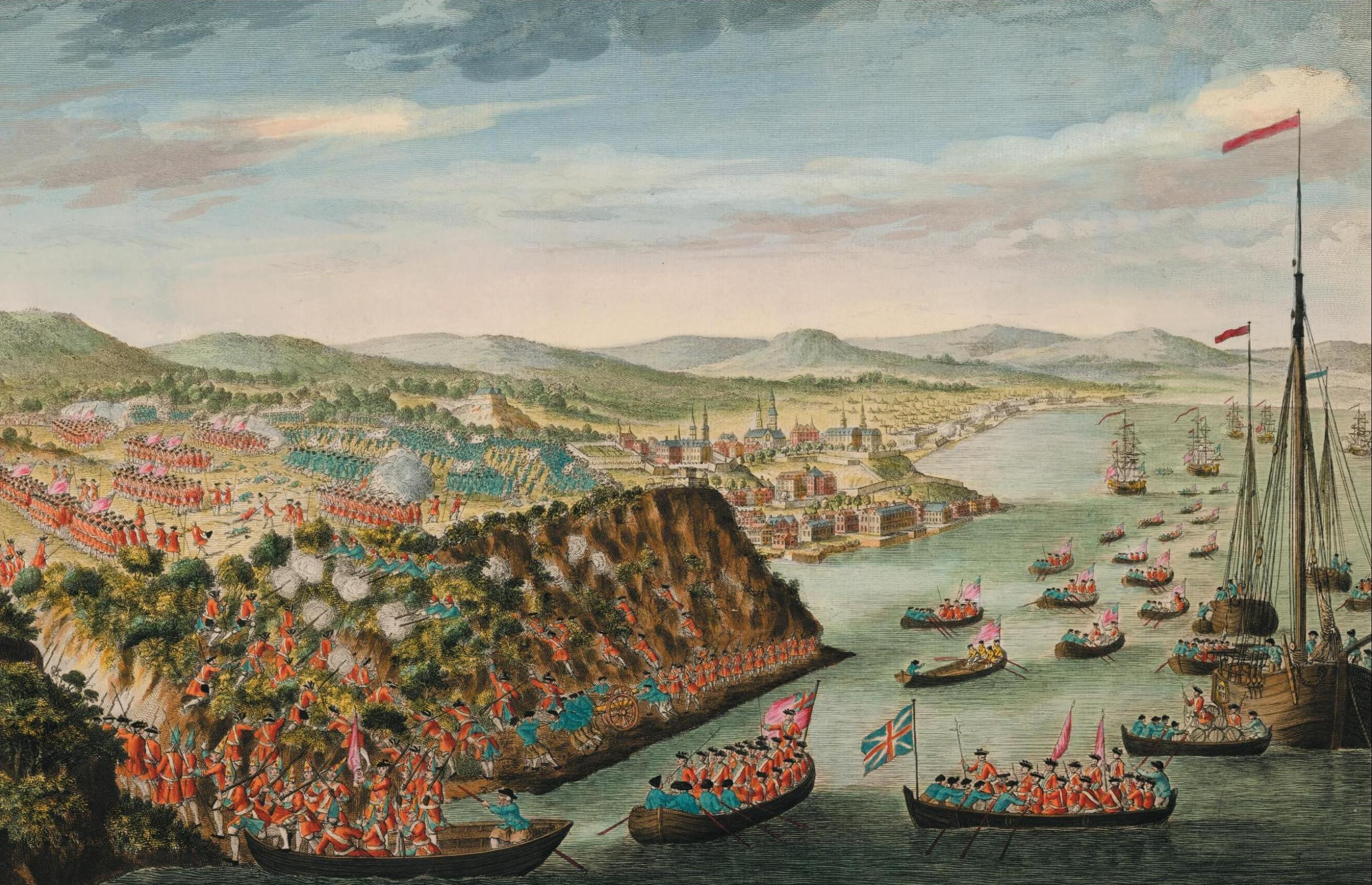
A drawing depicting the amphibious landing of British troops during the Siege of Quebec in 1759

The Siege of Louisbourg (1758) was a pivotal operation of the British military in 1758 (which included Colonial American Provincial and Ranger units) during the Seven Years' War (known in the United States as the French and Indian War), a war that ended the French colonial era in Atlantic Canada and led to the subsequent British campaign to capture all of French North America by the war's end.

Another major amphibious landing took place during the Seven Years' War, the Siege of Quebec in 1759. The British, in addition to colonial American Ranger units, had raised experimental light infantry units to integrate aspects of the ranger ideal into the regular army. They also produced the first specially designed landing-craft in order to enable their troops to cross the Saint Lawrence River in force. After considering and rejecting a number of plans for landings on the north shore of the river, Major General James Wolfe and his brigadiers decided in late August to land upriver of the city.

The British prepared for their risky deployment upstream. Troops had already been aboard landing ships and drifting up and down the river for several days when on 12 September Wolfe made a final decision on the British landing site, selecting L'Anse-au-Foulon. Wolfe's plan of attack depended on secrecy and surprise—a key element of a successful amphibious operation—a small party of men would land by night on the north shore, climb the tall cliff, seize a small road, and overpower the garrison that protected it, allowing the bulk of his army (5,000 men) to ascend the cliff by the small road and then deploy for battle on the plateau. The operation proved a success, leading to the surrender of the city, and heavily influenced subsequent engagements.

In 1762 a British force, with a small colonial American ranger contingent, successfully landed at Havana in Cuba, besieged the city and captured it after a two-month campaign thanks to improved coordination of land and sea forces. In the same year, 1762, British Royal Navy sailors and marines succeed in taking the capital of the East Indies: Manila in the Philippines as well.

=== American Revolutionary War ===
In 1776 Samuel Nicholas and the Continental Marines, the "progenitor" of the United States Marine Corps, made a first successful landing in the Raid of Nassau in the Bahamas. In 1782 The British rebuffed a long Franco-Spanish attempt to seize Gibraltar by water-borne forces. In 1783 a Franco-Spanish force invaded the British-held island of Minorca.

=== The Second British Empire ===
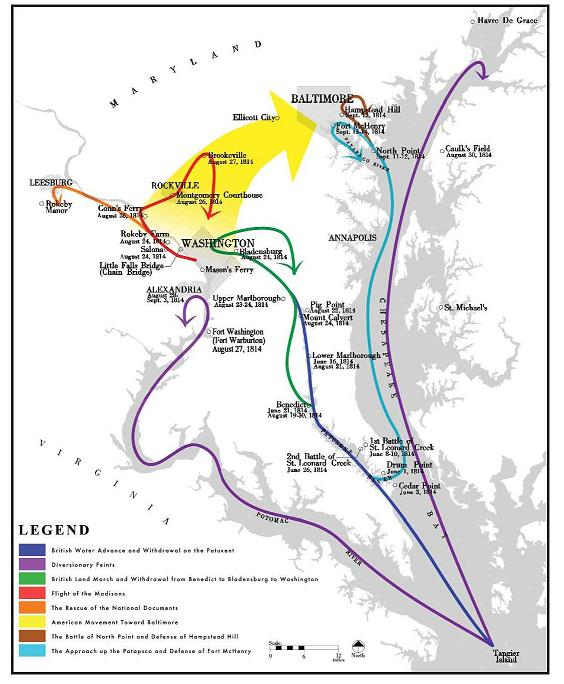
British and American movements during the Chesapeake Campaign

In 1798 Minorca experienced yet another of its many changes of sovereignty when captured by a British landing.

As the British Empire expanded worldwide, four colonies (Halifax, in Nova Scotia; Bermuda; Gibraltar; and Malta) were designated Imperial fortresses, from which Britain's domination of the oceans and the Mediterranean and Caribbean seas was maintained, including its ability to deny safe passage to enemy naval and merchant vessels while protecting its own merchant trade, as well as to its ability to project superior naval and military force anywhere on the planet.

This was demonstrated during the American War of 1812, when the ships of the North America Station of the Royal Navy and military forces of the British Army, Board of Ordnance, and Royal Marines, maintained a blockade of much of the Atlantic seaboard of the United States of America, carried out amphibious raids such as the 22 June 1813 Battle of Craney Island, and then launched the Chesapeake Campaign (defeating American forces in the Battle of Bladensburg, capturing and burning Washington, DC, and raiding Alexandria, Virginia), from Bermuda.

The point is further reinforced by Britain's poor showing during the war in the battles upon the Great Lakes and Lake Champlain. Without great naval fortresses or forward reinforced ports the Royal Navy was unable to hold and command the lakes, or stop amphibious raiding into Canada, such as the many raids on York (now Toronto) during the conflict. However, the strategic situation changed with the construction of HMS St Lawrence which was manned by Royal Navy sailors, rather than the landsman that had hitherto been used to complement the somewhat ad hoc flottilas used in the skirmishes on the lakes. Concurrently, the British would inflict the single biggest maritime loss of either side during the war by landing a force of 136 Royal Marines and sailors at the privateer base in Pettipaug, Connecticut. In this amphibious action, more akin to a "Commando" raid, they destroyed 26 vessels, capturing 2 and blowing up warehouses storing ammunition and supplies; under the noses of the American regulars and militia tasked with guarding the important base.

=== Industrial era ===
In the Mexican–American War, US forces under Winfield Scott launched the first major amphibious assault in US history, and its largest amphibious assault until WWII, in the 1847 Siege of Veracruz.

During the Crimean War of 1853–1856 the anti-Russian alliance launched an Anglo-French amphibious operation against Russia at Bomarsund, Finland on 8 August 1854.

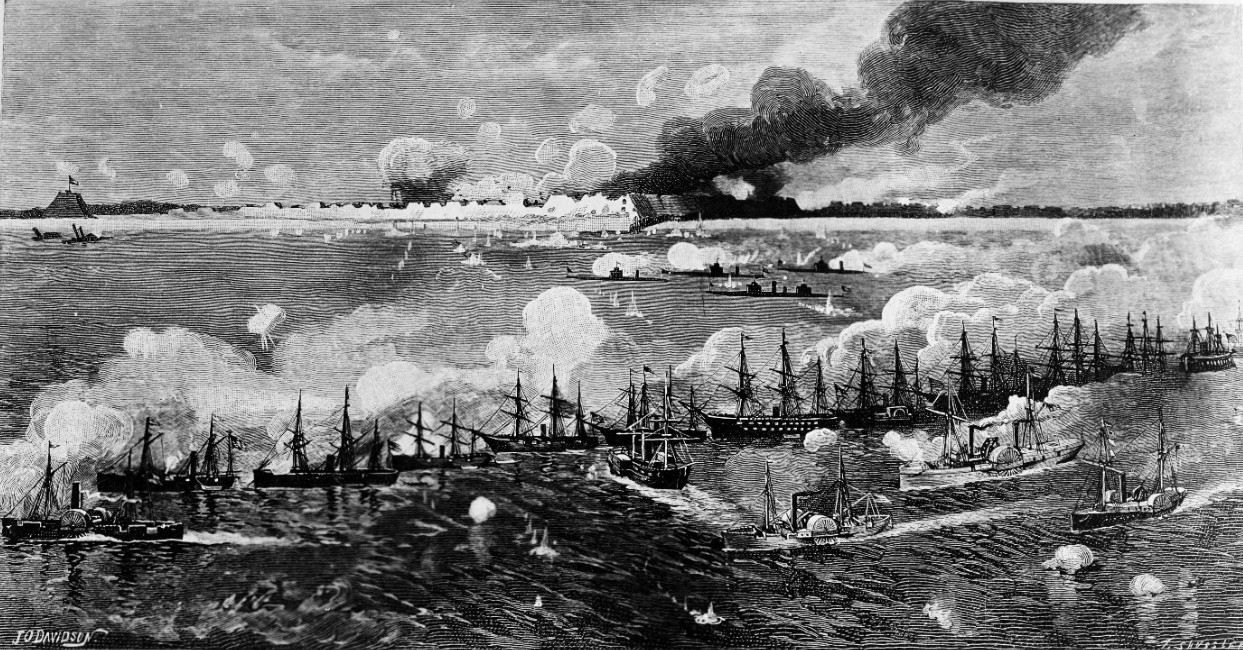
Ships of the North Atlantic Blockading Squadron bombarding Fort Fisher prior to the ground assault, during the American Civil War

During the American Civil War of 1861–1865 the United States made several amphibious assaults along the coastlines of the Confederate States. Actions at Hatteras Inlet (August 1861) and at Port Royal, South Carolina were the first of many attacks, others occurring on Roanoke Island, NC; Galveston, TX; Fort Sumter, Morris Island and James Island, SC; and several more. The largest such clash happened in January 1865 at Fort Fisher—the largest and most powerful fort in the world at the time—which protected the entrance of Wilmington, North Carolina. The assaulting force consisted of over 15,000 men and 70 warships with over 600 guns.

During the American Civil War, the Mississippi Marine Brigade was established to act swiftly against Confederate forces operating near the Mississippi River and its tributaries. The unit consisted of artillery, cavalry and infantry with the United States Ram Fleet used as transportation.

Amphibious warfare during the War of the Pacific of 1879 to 1883 saw coordination of army, navy and specialized units. The first amphibious assault of this war took place during the Battle of Pisagua when 2,100 Chilean troops successfully took Pisagua from 1,200 Peruvian and Bolivian defenders on 2 November 1879. Chilean Navy ships bombarded beach defenses for several hours at dawn, followed by open, oared boats landing army infantry and sapper units into waist-deep water, under enemy fire. An outnumbered first landing-wave fought at the beach; the second and third waves in the following hours succeeded in overcoming resistance and moving inland. By the end of the day, an expeditionary army of 10,000 had disembarked at the captured port.

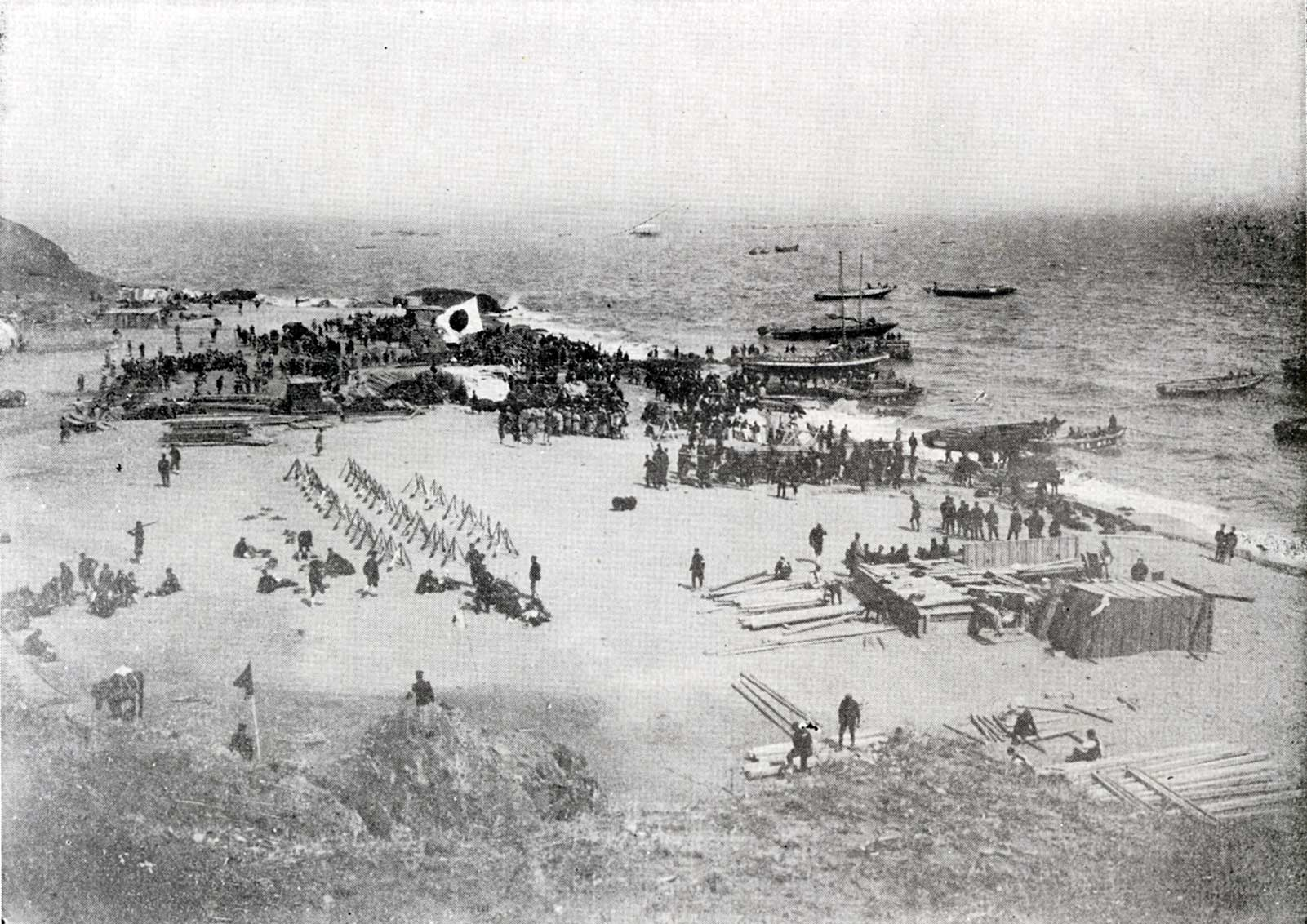
Japanese landing on Liaodong Peninsula, 1909

In 1881 Chilean ships transported approximately 30,000 men, along with their mounts and equipment, 500 miles (800 km) in order to attack Lima. Chilean commanders commissioned purpose-built, flat-bottomed landing craft that would deliver troops in shallow water closer to the beach, possibly the first purpose-built amphibious landing-craft in history: "These [36 shallow draft, flat-bottomed] boats would be able to land three thousand men and twelve guns in a single wave".

Neutral military observers closely studied landing tactics and operations during the War of the Pacific: two Royal Navy ships monitored the Battle of Pisagua; United States Navy observer Lt. Theodorus B. M. Mason included an account in his report The War on the Pacific Coast of South America. The USS Wachusett with Alfred Thayer Mahan in command, was stationed at Callao, Peru, protecting American interests during the final stages of the War of the Pacific. He formulated his concept of sea power while reading a history book in an English gentleman's club in Lima, Peru. This concept became the foundation for his celebrated The Influence of Sea Power upon History (1890).

An amphibious assault took place on the beaches of Veracruz, Mexico in 1914, when the United States Navy attacked and occupied the city as result of the Tampico Affair.

== Modern operations ==
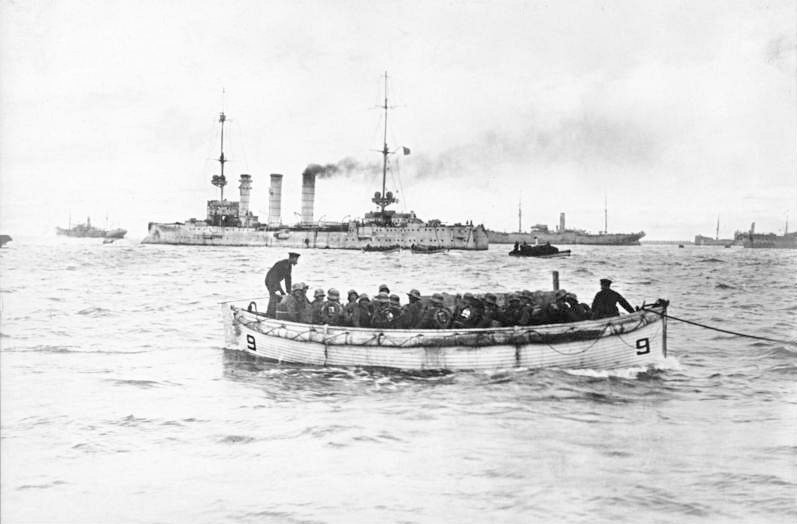
German invasion fleet during Operation Albion

World War I (1914-1918) marked the beginning of the first "modern" amphibious-warfare operations. However, tactics and equipment were still rudimentary and required much improvisation.

At the time, British Royal Marine Light Infantry (RMLI, merged with the Royal Marine Artillery in the 1920s to form the Royal Marines) were used primarily as naval parties onboard Royal Navy warships to maintain discipline and to man ships' guns. The RMLI joined a new Royal Navy entity, the Royal Naval Division, formed in 1914 (out of personnel not needed on ships) to fight on land; however, throughout the conflict, army units were depended upon to provide the bulk, if not all, of troops used in amphibious landings.

The first amphibious assault of the war was the Battle of Bita Paka (11 September 1914) was fought south of Kabakaul, on the island of New Britain, and was a part of the invasion and subsequent occupation of German New Guinea by the Australian Naval and Military Expeditionary Force (AN&MEF) shortly after the outbreak of the First World War. A British amphibious assault ended in disaster in November 1914, after a large British Indian Army force was directed to launch an amphibious assault on Tanga, German East Africa. British actions prior to the assault, however, alerted the Germans to prepare to repel an invasion. The Indian forces suffered heavy casualties when they advanced on the city, forcing them to withdraw back to their boats, leaving much of their equipment behind.

A plan was devised to land British heavy tanks from pontoons in support of the Third Battle of Ypres in 1917, but this was abandoned.

The Imperial Russian Army and Navy also grew adept in amphibious warfare in the Black Sea, conducting many raids and bombardments on Ottoman positions. But events after the February Revolution of March 1917 curtailed Russian plans for an amphibious assault on the Bosphorus.

On 11 October 1917, German land and naval forces launched an amphibious assault, code-named Operation Albion, on the islands of Saaremaa (Ösel), Hiiumaa (Dagö) and Muhu (Moon); together they control the entrance to the Gulf of Riga. By the end of the month German forces had successfully overrun the islands forcing the Russians to abandon them with the loss of some 20,000 troops, 100 guns and the pre-dreadnought battleship Slava. The capture of the islands opened a route for German naval forces into the Gulf of Finland threatening the city of Petrograd, a threat that contributed to the cessation of hostilities on the Eastern front.

=== Gallipoli ===
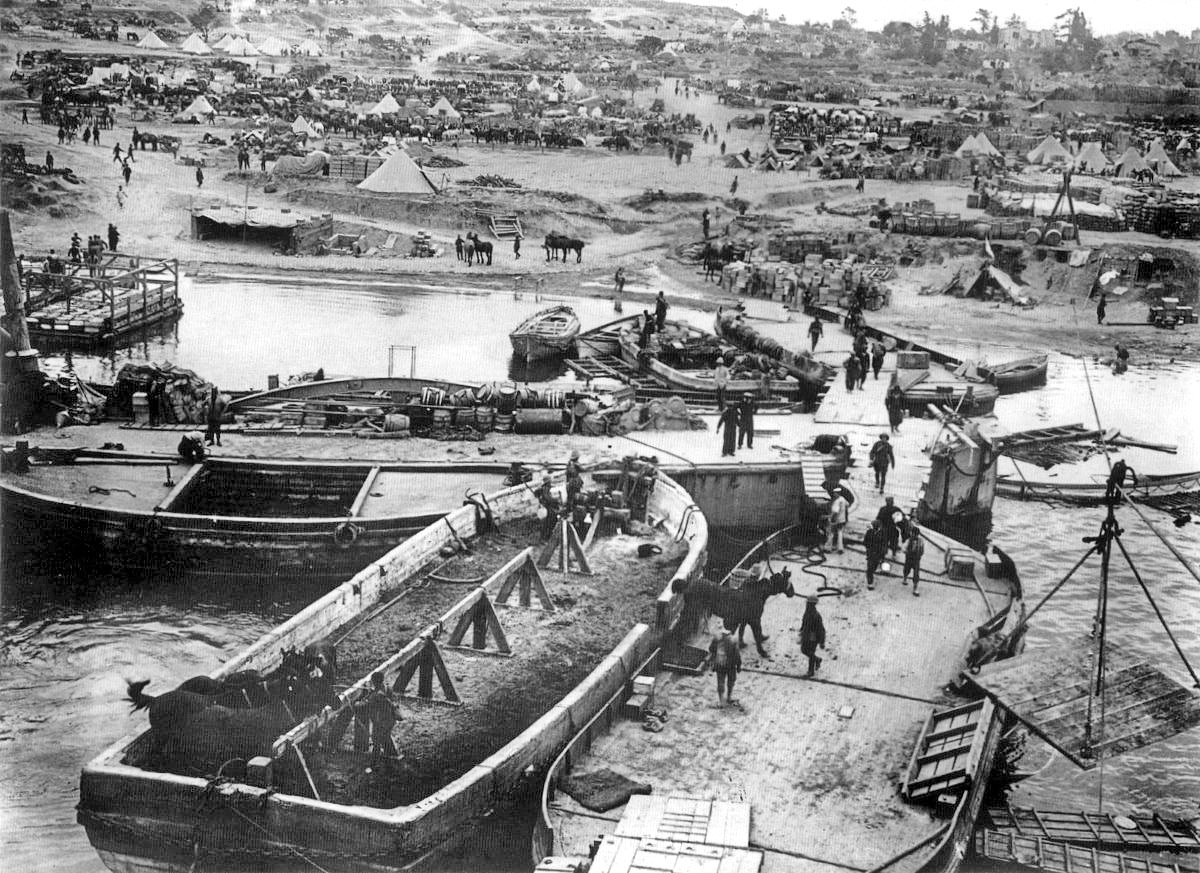
V Beach about two days after the landing, seen from the bow of the River Clyde

The first large-scale amphibious operations, ones that were to heavily influence theorists in the decades to come, took place as part of the Battle of Gallipoli in 1915 against the Ottoman Empire during World War I. The Gallipoli peninsula forms the northern bank of the Dardanelles, a strait that provided a sea route to what was then the Russian Empire, one of the Allied powers during the war. Intending to secure it, Russia's allies Britain and France launched a naval attack followed by an amphibious landing on the peninsula with the eventual aim of capturing the Ottoman capital of Constantinople (modern-day Istanbul). Although the naval attack was repelled and the land campaign failed, the campaign was the first modern amphibious landing, and featured air support, specialized landing-craft and a naval bombardment.

The British seaplane tender HMS Ark Royal supported the landings under the command of Commander Robert Clark-Hall. Seaplanes were used for aerial reconnaissance, ground support for the troops landing at Anzac Cove and the bombing of Ottoman fortifications. Ark Royal was augmented by a squadron from the No. 3 Squadron of the Royal Naval Air Service, operating from a nearby island.

Initial Allied landings, starting on 25 April, took place in unmodified rowing-boats that were extremely vulnerable to attack from the shore defences. The first purpose-built landing craft were built for the campaign. SS River Clyde, built as a collier, was adapted to be a landing ship for the Landing at Cape Helles. Openings were cut in her steel hull as sally-ports from which troops would emerge onto gangways and then to a bridge of smaller boats from the ship to the beach. Boiler plate and sandbags were mounted on her bow, and behind them a battery of 11 machine-guns was installed. The machine-gun battery was manned by Royal Naval Air Service men. Work began on painting River Clyde's hull sandy yellow as camouflage, but this was incomplete by the time of the landing.

It soon became clear that the Turkish defence was equipped with rapid-fire weapons, which meant that ordinary landing boats were inadequate for the task. In February 1915, orders had been placed for the design of purpose-built landing craft. A design was created in four days resulting in an order for 200 'X' Lighters (or X-lighters) with a spoon-shaped bow to take shelving beaches and a drop-down frontal ramp.

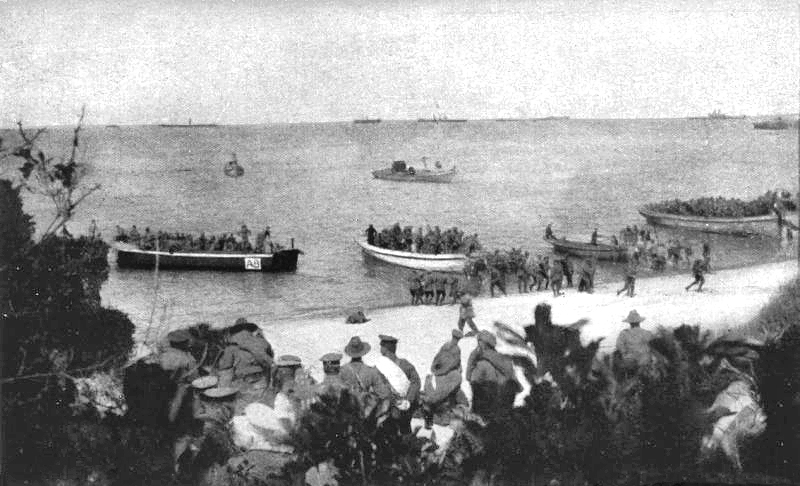
Anzac Beach amphibious landing, on 25 April 1915

The first use took place after they had been towed to the Aegean and performed successfully in the 6 August 1915 landing at Suvla Bay of IX Corps, commanded by Commander Edward Unwin.

'X' Lighters, known to the soldiers as 'Beetles', carried about 500 men, displaced 200 tons (or 160 tons according to some sources) and were based on London barges, being 105 feet 6 inches long, 21 feet wide, and 7 feet 6 inches deep. The engines mainly ran on heavy oil and ran at a maximal speed of approximately 8 knots (9.2 mph). The sides of the ships were bullet-proof, and the design incorporated a ramp on the bow for disembarkation.

The lessons of the Gallipoli campaign had a significant impact upon the development of amphibious operational planning, and were subsequently studied by military planners prior to operations such as the Normandy Landings in 1944 and assaults during the Falklands War in 1982. The campaign also influenced US Marine Corps amphibious operations during the Pacific War, and continues to influence US amphibious doctrine.

During the interwar period the Gallipoli operations "became a focal point for the study of amphibious warfare" in the United Kingdom and United States, because they involved the four types of amphibious operations: the raid, demonstration, assault and withdrawal. Analysis of the campaign before World War II led to a belief among many armed forces that amphibious assaults could not succeed against modern defences. The perception continued until the Normandy Landings in June 1944, despite some successful examples of amphibious operations earlier in the World War II, such as those in Italy in September 1943, and at Tarawa and in the Gilbert Islands ()1942 to 1944 in the Pacific. Although the negative perception prevailed among Allied planners in the interwar years, the war situation after 1940 meant that such operations had to be considered. However, despite early successes in North Africa (Operation Torch) and Italy, it was not until Normandy that the belief that "opposed landings could not succeed" was completely excised.

=== Interwar developments ===
One of the first amphibious landings involving armour was conducted by the Irish National Army in 1922, during the Irish Civil War. Landings against Republican rebels at Westport, Fenit and Cork all involved armour cars. The Westport and Fenit landings involved light armoured cars and 18-pounder artillery guns being hoisted off the ships by crane. Heavier armoured cars were used at Cork, resulting in some difficulty. While Irish troops could reach the coast in small boats from naval vessels offshore, the ships had to dock to unload the heavy vehicles and artillery guns. These operations were a major success for the Irish government forces, mainly due to the element of surprise and the use of armoured vehicles and artillery. Government forces were able to capture all the major towns and cities in southern Ireland.

The Alhucemas landing on 8 September 1925, performed by a Spanish-French coalition against rebel Berber tribesmen in the north of Morocco, was an amphibious landing where tanks were used for the first time and massive aerial and naval gunfire support was employed by the landing forces, directed by spotting personnel with communication devices.

Floating depots were organized with medical, water, ammunition and food supplies, to be dispatched ashore when needed. The barges used in this landing were the surviving "K" boats from Gallipoli, upgraded in Spanish shipyards.

In 1938, Japanese forces attacked Chinese defenders over the Yangtze River at the Battle of Wuhan. Soon, the Japanese would later further improve its techniques upon seaborne assaults by the Second Sino-Japanese War. By World War II, marines such as the Special Naval Landing Force used amphibious landings to attack and sweep across territories in South East Asia. Their technique of surprise landings with naval support inspired the British and American landings in World War II such as D-Day and the Pacific Campaign.

==== Britain ====
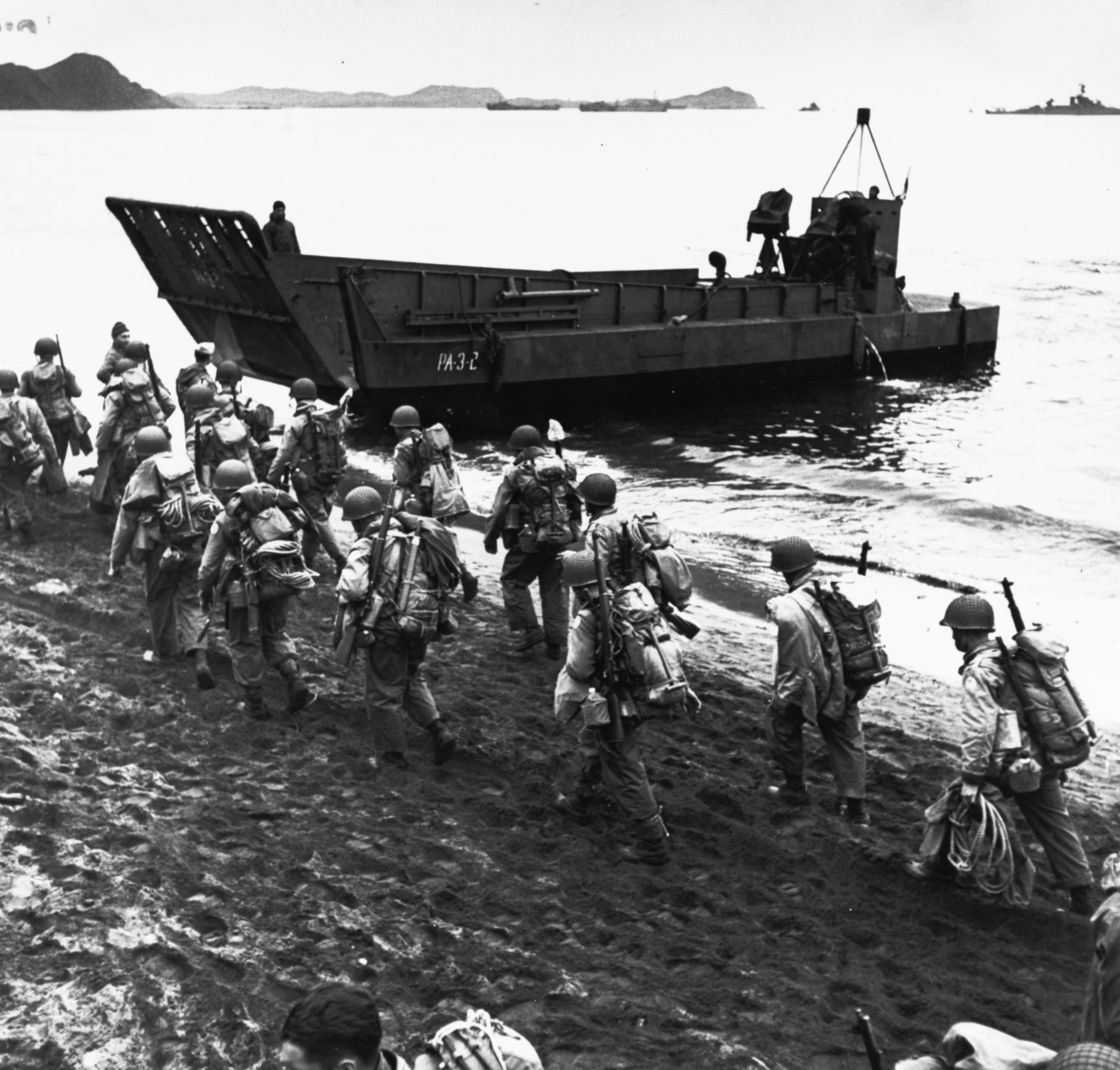
The Landing Craft Mechanized was designed by Inter-Service Training and Development Centre from 1938 as the first specialized amphibious ship for the transportation of tanks.

During the inter-war period, the combination of the negative experience at Gallipoli and economic stringency contributed to the delay in procuring equipment and adopting a universal doctrine for amphibious operations in the Royal Navy.

The costly failure of the Gallipoli campaign coupled with the emerging potential of airpower satisfied many in naval and military circles that the age of amphibious operations had come to a close. Still, throughout the 1920s and 1930s, animated discussion in Staff Colleges in Britain and the Indian Army Staff College at Quetta surrounded the strategic potential of the Dardanelles campaign compared with the strategic stalemate of the Western Front. The economic austerity of the worldwide economic depression and the government's adoption of the Ten Year Rule assured that such theoretical talk would not result in the procurement of any large scale equipment.

Despite this outlook, the British produced the Motor Landing Craft in 1920, based on their experience with the early 'Beetle' armoured transport. The craft could put a medium tank directly onto a beach. From 1924, it was used with landing boats in annual exercises in amphibious landings. It was later called Landing Craft, Mechanized (LCM) and was the predecessor of all Allied landing craft mechanised (LCM).

The Army and Royal Navy formed a landing craft committee to "recommend... the design of landing craft". A prototype motor landing craft, designed by J. Samuel White of Cowes, was built and first sailed in 1926. It weighed 16 tons and had a box-like appearance, having a square bow and stern. To prevent fouling of the propellers in a craft destined to spend time in surf and possibly be beached, a crude waterjet propulsion system was devised by White's designers. A Hotchkiss petrol engine drove a centrifugal pump which produced a jet of water, pushing the craft ahead or astern, and steering it, according to how the jet was directed. Speed was 5–6 knots and its beaching capacity was good. By 1930, three MLC were operated by the Royal Navy.

The Inter-Service Training and Development Centre, which helped to pioneer modern amphibious warfare doctrine, came under the command of Combined Operations Headquarters in June 1940. Pictured, the badge of Combined Operations.

For a short journey, from shore to shore, the cargo could be rolled or carried into the boat over its ramp. On longer journeys, ship to shore, a derrick would lower the MLC into the sea from the transporting vessel. The derrick would then lower the vehicle or cargo load. Upon touching down on shore, soldiers or vehicles exited by the bow ramp.

Although there was much official apathy toward amphibious operations, this began to change in the late 1930s. The Royal Naval Staff College at Greenwich, drafted a document detailing combined operations requirements and submitted it to the Chiefs of Staff in 1936. The document recommended the establishment of an inter-service 'Training and Development Centre', with a permanent force of Royal Marines attached to it. Its functions were to "train in all methods for the seizure of defended beaches; develop the materiel necessary for such methods, with special regard to protection of troops, speed of landing, and the attainment of surprise; and develop methods and materiel for the destruction or neutralization of enemy defenses, including bombardment and aircraft co-operation.

The Inter-Service Training and Development Centre was established at Fort Cumberland, near Portsmouth in 1938, and brought together representatives from the Royal Navy, Army, and Royal Air Force convened with the portfolio of developing methods and equipment to use in Combined Operations.

The Centre examined certain specific problems, including craft for landing tanks, beach organisation, floating piers, headquarters ships, amphibian tanks, underwater obstacles, the landing of water and petrol and the use of small craft in amphibious raids By the end of 1939 the ISTDC had codified a policy for landings, and defended it at Staff College discussions. Operational experience during the Second World War introduced modifications to this landing policy, but it was essentially the policy used in the Torch and Husky landings four years later.

The essential shape of this landing policy is described by Bernard Fergusson in The Watery Maze,

The system provided for an approach under cover of darkness in fast ships carrying special craft; the craft being sent ashore while the ships lay out of sight of land; small-craft smoke and gun protection while the beachhead was seized; the landing of a reserve; the capture of a covering position far enough inland to secure the beach and anchorage from enemy fire; the bringing in of ships carrying the main body; and finally the discharge of vehicles and stores by other craft specially designed to do so directly on to beaches. And in all this it was important to achieve tactical surprise.

Among the many tactical innovations introduced by the centre, codified in the Manual on Combined Operations and the Standard Naval Bombardment Code, was the use of Floating Piers (pontoons) to bridge the water gap, the creation of Smoke Generating devices to obscure the assault and the use of infrared directional beacons for landing accuracy. The centre also played a role in the development of the first specialized landing crafts, including the Assault Landing Craft, the Mechanized Landing Craft (LCM(1)), the Landing Craft Tank (Mk. 1), Support Landing Craft LCS(1), LCS(2) and Landing Ship Infantry.

Divisional-sized amphibious landing exercises were carried out by the British Army in the 1930s.

==== United States ====
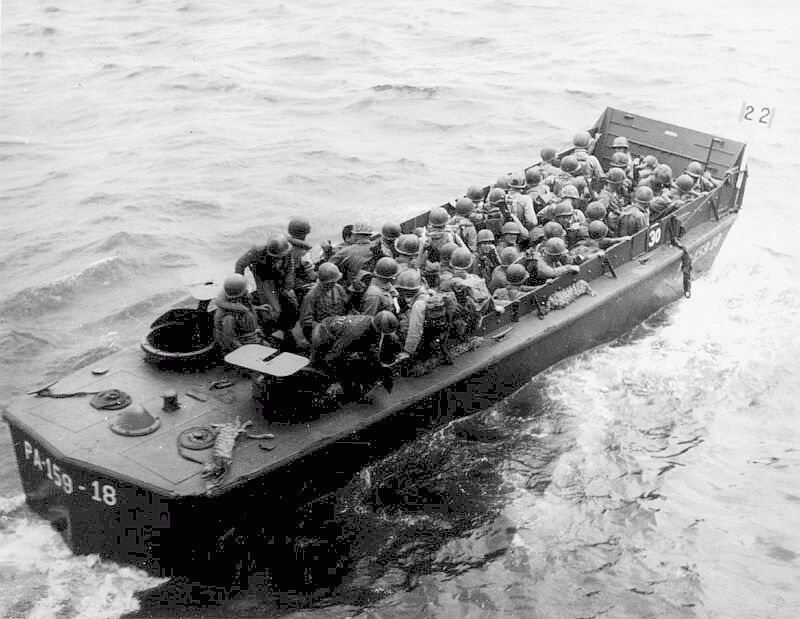
LCVPs, known as 'Higgins Boats', were the first specialized landing craft for the US Navy. Pictured, USS Darke LCVP 18, possibly with Army troops as reinforcements at Okinawa, 1945.

In contrast to the British attitude, the U.S. military, especially the Marine Corps remained enthusiastic at the possibilities of amphibious warfare. The Marine Corps was searching for an expanded mission after World War I, during which it had merely been used as a junior version of the Army infantry. During the 1920s, it found a new mission—to be a fast-reacting, light infantry fighting force carried rapidly to far off locations by the US Navy. Its special role would be amphibious landings on enemy-held islands, but it took years to figure out how to do that. The Mahanian notion of a decisive fleet battle required forward bases for the Navy close to the enemy. After the Spanish–American War the Marines gained the mission of occupying and defending those forward bases, and began a training program on Culebra Island, Puerto Rico.

As early as 1900 the General Board of the United States Navy considered building advance bases for naval operations in the Pacific and the Caribbean. The Marine Corps was given this mission in 1920, but the challenge was to avoid another disaster like Gallipoli. The conceptual breakthrough came in 1921 when Major "Pete" Ellis wrote Advanced Base Operations in Micronesia, a secret 30,000-word manifesto that proved inspirational to Marine strategists and highly prophetic. To win a war in the Pacific, the Navy would have to fight its way through thousands of miles of ocean controlled by the Japanese—including the Marshall, Caroline, Marianas and Ryukyu island chains. If the Navy could land Marines to seize selected islands, they could become forward bases.

Ellis argued that with an enemy prepared to defend the beaches, success depended on high-speed movement of waves of assault craft, covered by heavy naval gunfire and attack from the air. He predicted that the decisive action would take place on the beach itself, so the assault teams would need not just infantry but also machine gun units, light artillery, light tanks, and combat engineers to defeat beach obstacles and defenses. Assuming the enemy had its own artillery, the landing craft would have to be specially built to protect the landing force. The failure at Gallipoli came because the Turks could easily reinforce the specific landing sites. The Japanese would be unable to land new forces on the islands under attack.

Not knowing which of the many islands would be the American target, the Japanese would have to disperse their strength by garrisoning many islands that would never be attacked. An island like Eniwetok in the Marshall Islands, would, Ellis estimated, require two regiments, or 4,000 Marines. Guided by Marine observer aircraft, and supplemented by Marine light bombers, warships would provide enough firepower so that Marines would not need any heavy artillery (in contrast to the Army, which relied heavily on its artillery). Shelling defended islands was a new mission for warships. The Ellis model was officially endorsed in 1927 by the Joint Board of the Army and Navy (a forerunner of the Joint Chiefs of Staff).

However, actual implementation of the new mission took another decade because the Marine Corps was preoccupied in Central America and the Navy was slow to start training in how to support the landings. The prototype advanced base force officially evolved into the Fleet Marine Force (FMF) in 1933. In 1939, during the annual Fleet Landing Exercises, the FMF became interested in the military potential of Andrew Higgins's design of a powered, shallow-draught boat. These LCVPs, dubbed the 'Higgins Boats', were reviewed and passed by the U.S. Naval Bureau of Construction and Repair. Soon, the Higgins boats were developed to a final design with a ramp, and were produced in large numbers.

=== Second World War ===
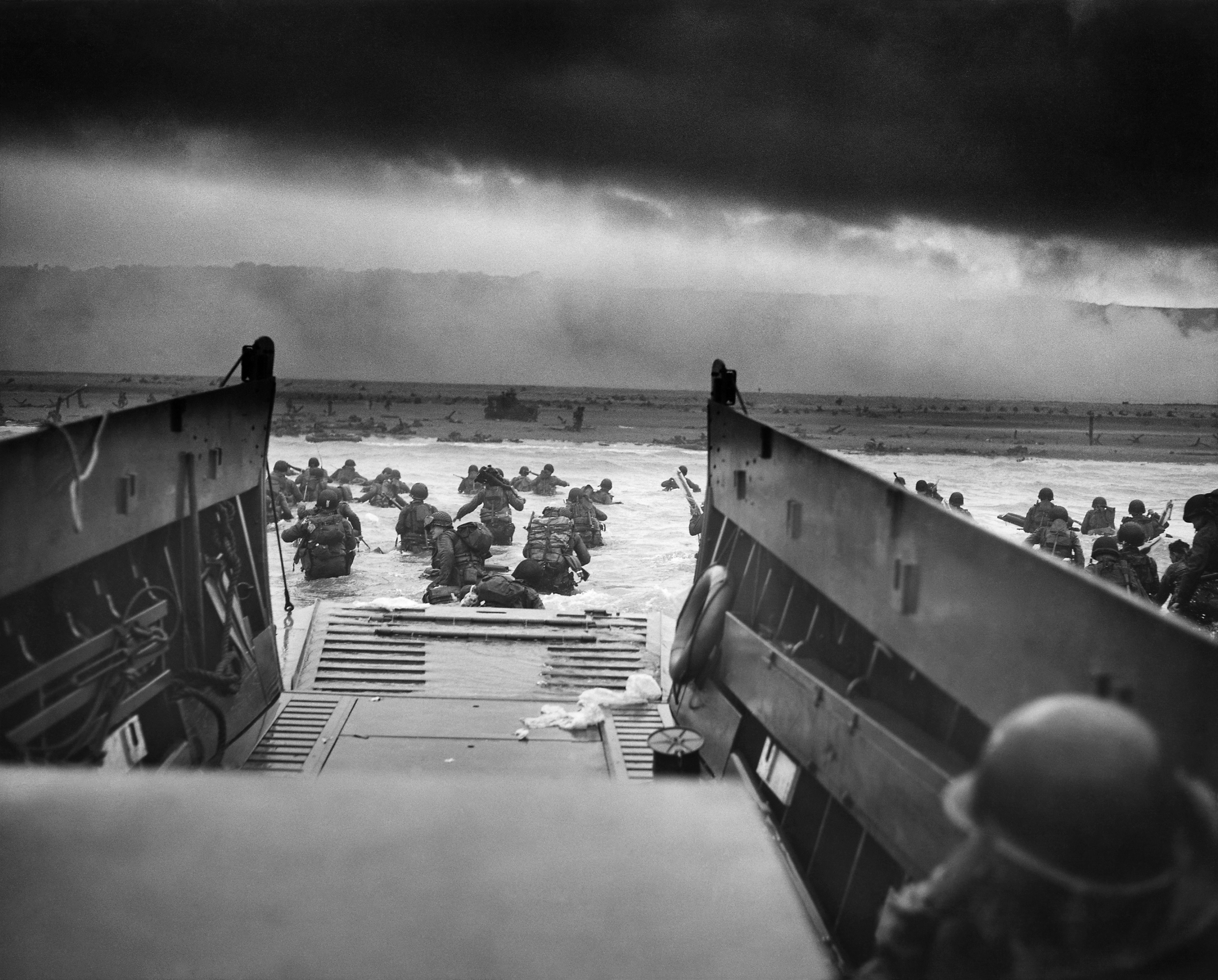
Into the Jaws of Death: Troops from the U.S. 1st Division landing on Omaha beach as part of Operation Overlord

By the Second World War tactics and equipment had moved on. The first use of British landing craft in an opposed landing in the Second World War, saw the disembarkation of French Foreign Legionnaires of the 13th Demi-Brigade and supporting French Hotchkiss H39 tanks on the beach at Bjerkvik, eight miles (13 km) above Narvik, on 13 May during the Norwegian campaign.

The first major and successful amphibious operation was Operation Ironclad, a British campaign to capture Vichy French-controlled Madagascar. The naval contingent consisted of over 50 vessels, drawn from Force H, the British Home Fleet and the British Eastern Fleet, commanded by Rear Admiral Edward Neville Syfret.

The fleet included the aircraft carrier Illustrious, her sister ship Indomitable and the aging battleship Ramillies to cover the landings. The first wave of the British 29th Infantry Brigade and No. 5 Commando landed in assault craft on 5 May 1942, follow-up waves were by two brigades of the 5th Infantry Division and Royal Marines. Air cover was provided mainly by Fairey Albacore and Fairey Swordfish torpedo bombers which attacked Vichy shipping.

Purpose-built landing craft were among the vessels used at the evacuation from Dunkirk (Operation Dynamo) and an amphibious operation was tried out at Dieppe in 1942. The operation proved a costly failure, but the lessons, hard learned, were used later. Many small-scale operations were conducted by the Allies on the Axis-held coast of Europe, including raids on the Lofoten Islands, St Nazaire and Bruneval.

==== Specialized infantry landing craft ====
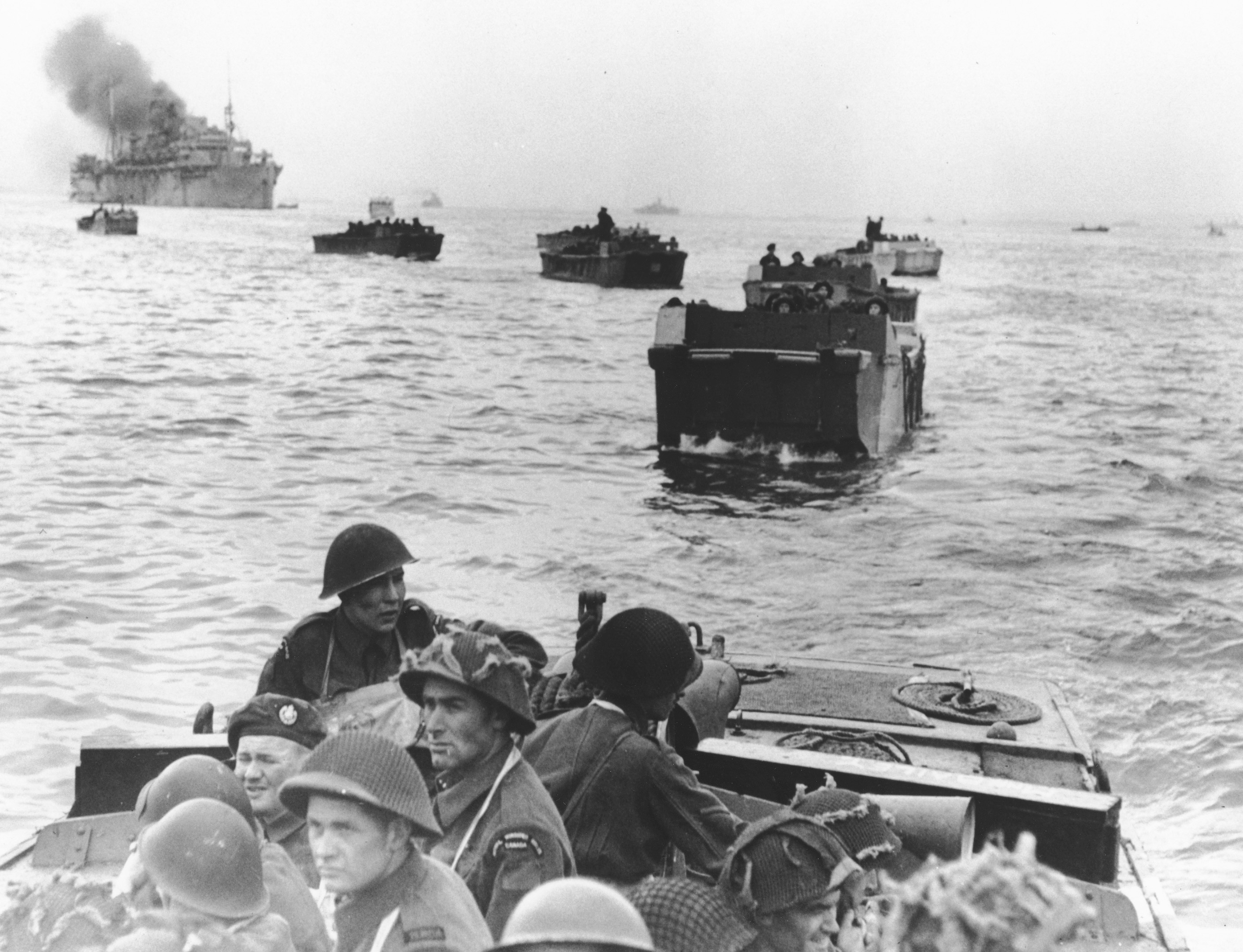
Canadian landings at Juno Beach in the Landing Craft Assault

In the run up to World War II, many specialized landing craft, both for infantry and vehicles, were developed. In November 1938, the Inter-Service Training and Development Centre proposed a new type of landing craft. Its specifications were to weigh less than ten long tons, to be able to carry the thirty-one men of a British Army platoon and five assault engineers or signallers, and to be so shallow drafted as to be able to land them, wet only up to their knees, in eighteen inches of water. All of these specifications made the Landing Craft Assault; a separate set of requirements was laid down for a vehicle and supplies carrier, although previously the two roles had been combined in the Motor Landing Craft.

J. S. White of Cowes built a prototype to the Fleming design. Eight weeks later the craft was doing trials on the Clyde. All landing craft designs must find a compromise between two divergent priorities; the qualities that make a good sea boat are opposite those that make a craft suitable for beaching. The craft had a hull built of double-diagonal mahogany planking. The sides were plated with "10lb. DIHT" armour, a heat treated steel based on D1 steel, in this case Hadfield's Resista 1/4".

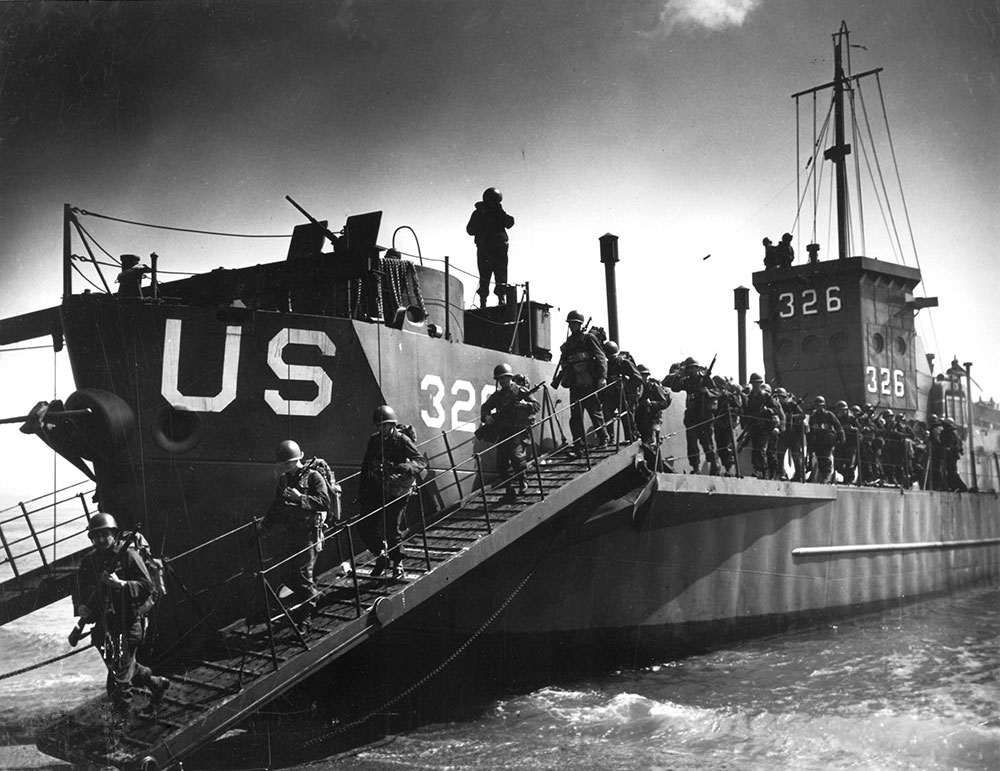
USS LCI-326, a Landing Craft Infantry, during training for D-Day

The Landing Craft Assault remained the most common British and Commonwealth landing craft of World War II, and the humblest vessel admitted to the books of the Royal Navy on D-Day. Prior to July 1942, these craft were referred to as "Assault Landing Craft" (ALC), but "Landing Craft; Assault" (LCA) was used thereafter to conform with the joint US–UK nomenclature system.

The Landing Craft Infantry was a stepped up amphibious assault ship, developed in response to a British request for a vessel capable of carrying and landing substantially more troops than the smaller Landing Craft Assault (LCA). The result was a small steel ship that could land 200 troops, traveling from rear bases on its own bottom at a speed of up to 15 knots. The original British design was envisioned as being a "one time use" vessel which would simply ferry the troops across the English Channel, and were considered an expendable vessel. As such, no troop sleeping accommodations were placed in the original design. This was changed shortly after initial use of these ships, when it was discovered that many missions would require overnight accommodations.

The first LCI(L)s entered service in 1943 chiefly with the Royal Navy (RN) and United States Navy. Some 923 LCI were built in ten American shipyards and 211 provided under lend-lease to the Royal Navy.

==== Specialized vehicle landing craft ====
Following the Inter-Service Training and Development Centre's (ISTDC) successful development of the infantry carrying LCA, attention turned to the means of efficiently delivering a tank to a beach in 1938. Inquires were made of the army as to the heaviest tank that might be employed in a landing operation. The army wanted to be able to land a 12-ton tank, but the ISTDC, anticipating weight increases in future tank models specified 16 tons burthen for Mechanised Landing Craft designs. Another governor on any design was the need to land tanks and other vehicles in less than approximately 2 1/2 feet of water.

Design work began at John I. Thornycroft Ltd. in May 1938 with trials completing in February 1940. Although early LCM(1)s were powered by two Thornycroft 60 bhp petrol engines, the majority were powered by Chrysler, in-line, 6-cylinder Crown petrol engines. Constructed of steel and selectively clad with armour plate, this shallow-draft, barge-like boat with a crew of 6, could ferry a tank of 16 long tons to shore at 7 knots (13 km/h). Depending on the weight of the tank to be transported the craft might be lowered into the water by its davits already loaded or could have the tank placed in it after being lowered into the water.

Although the Royal Navy had the Landing Craft Mechanised at its disposal, in 1940, Prime Minister Winston Churchill demanded an amphibious vessel capable of landing at least three 36-ton heavy tanks directly onto a beach, able to sustain itself at sea for at least a week, and inexpensive and easy to build. Admiral Maund, Director of the Inter-Service Training and Development Centre (which had developed the Landing Craft Assault), gave the job to naval architect Sir Roland Baker, who within three days completed initial drawings for a 152-foot (46 m) landing craft with a 29-foot (8.8 m) beam and a shallow draft. Ship builders Fairfields and John Brown agreed to work out details for the design under the guidance of the Admiralty Experimental Works at Haslar. Tank tests with models soon determined the characteristics of the craft, indicating that it would make 10 knots (19 km/h; 12 mph) on engines delivering about 700 hp (520 kW). Designated the LCT Mark 1, 20 were ordered in July 1940 and a further 10 in October 1940.

The first LCT Mark 1 was launched by Hawthorn Leslie in November 1940. It was an all-welded 372-ton steel-hulled vessel that drew only 3 feet (0.91 m) of water at the bow. Sea trials soon proved the Mark 1 to be difficult to handle and almost unmanageable in some sea conditions. The designers set about correcting the faults of the Mark 1 in the LCT Mark 2. Longer and wider, three Paxman diesel or Napier Lion petrol engines replaced the Hall-Scotts, and 15 and 20 lb. armoured shielding was added to the wheelhouse and gun tubs.

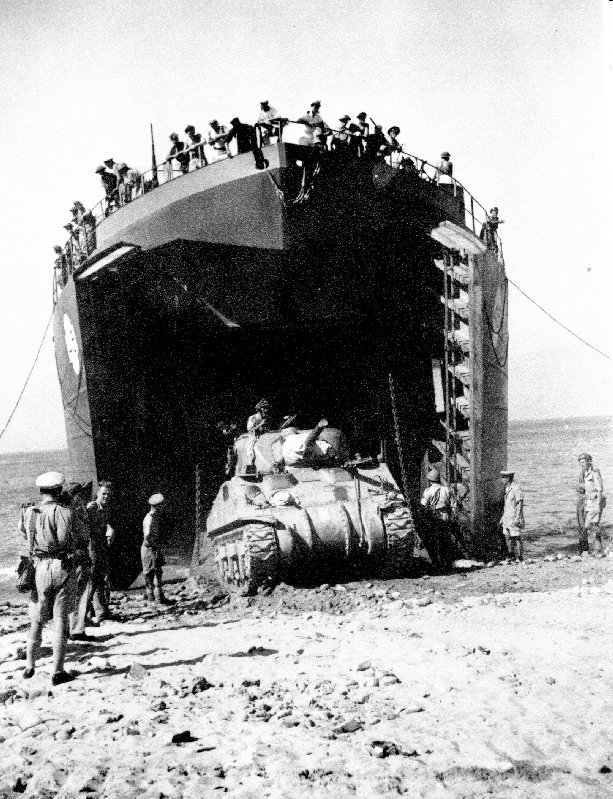
A Canadian LST off-loads an M4 Sherman during the Allied invasion of Sicily in 1943.

The Mark 3 had an additional 32-foot (9.8 m) midsection that gave it a length of 192 feet (59 m) and a displacement of 640 tons. Even with this extra weight, the vessel was slightly faster than the Mark 1. The Mk.3 was accepted on 8 April 1941, and was prefabricated in five sections. The Mark 4 was slightly shorter and lighter than the Mk.3, but had a much wider beam (38 ft 9 in (11.81 m)) and was intended for cross channel operations as opposed to seagoing use. When tested in early assault operations, like the ill-fated Canadian commando raid on Dieppe in 1942, the lack of manoeuvring ability led to the preference for a shorter overall length in future variants, most of which were built in the United States.

When the United States entered the war in December 1941, the U.S. Navy had no amphibious vessels at all, and found itself obliged to consider British designs already in existence. One of these, advanced by K.C. Barnaby of Thornycroft, was for a double-ended LCT to work with landing ships. The Bureau of Ships quickly set about drawing up plans for landing craft based on Barnaby's suggestions, although with only one ramp. The result, in early 1942, was the LCT Mark 5, a 117-foot craft with a beam of 32 feet that could accommodate five 30-ton or four 40-ton tanks or 150 tons of cargo. With a crew of twelve men and one officer, this 286 ton landing craft had the merit of being able to be shipped to combat areas in three separate water-tight sections aboard a cargo ship or carried pre-assembled on the flat deck of an LST. The Mk.5 would be launched by heeling the LST on its beam to let the craft slide off its chocks into the sea, or cargo ships could lower each of the three sections into the sea where they were joined.

A further development was the Landing Ship, Tank designation, built to support amphibious operations by carrying significant quantities of vehicles, cargo, and landing troops directly onto an unimproved shore. The British evacuation from Dunkirk in 1940 demonstrated to the Admiralty that the Allies needed relatively large, ocean-going ships capable of shore-to-shore delivery of tanks and other vehicles in amphibious assaults upon the continent of Europe. The first purpose-built LST design was HMS Boxer. To carry 13 Churchill infantry tanks, 27 vehicles and nearly 200 men (in addition to the crew) at a speed of 18 knots, it could not have the shallow draught that would have made for easy unloading. As a result, each of the three (Boxer, Bruiser, and Thruster) ordered in March 1941 had a very long ramp stowed behind the bow doors.

In November 1941, a small delegation from the British Admiralty arrived in the United States to pool ideas with the United States Navy's Bureau of Ships with regard to development of ships and also including the possibility of building further Boxers in the US. During this meeting, it was decided that the Bureau of Ships would design these vessels. The LST(2) design incorporated elements of the first British LCTs from their designer, Sir Rowland Baker, who was part of the British delegation. This included sufficient buoyancy in the ships' sidewalls that they would float even with the tank deck flooded. The LST(2) gave up the speed of HMS Boxer at only 10 knots but had a similar load while drawing only 3 feet forward when beaching.

In three separate acts dated 6 February 1942, 26 May 1943, and 17 December 1943, Congress provided the authority for the construction of LSTs along with a host of other auxiliaries, destroyer escorts, and assorted landing craft. The enormous building program quickly gathered momentum. Such a high priority was assigned to the construction of LSTs that the previously laid keel of an aircraft carrier was hastily removed to make room for several LSTs to be built in her place. The keel of the first LST was laid down on 10 June 1942 at Newport News, Va., and the first standardized LSTs were floated out of their building dock in October. Twenty-three were in commission by the end of 1942. Lightly armored, they could steam cross the ocean with a full load on their own power, carrying infantry, tanks and supplies directly onto the beaches. Together with 2,000 other landing craft, the LSTs gave the troops a protected, quick way to make combat landings, beginning in summer 1943.

==== D-Day ====
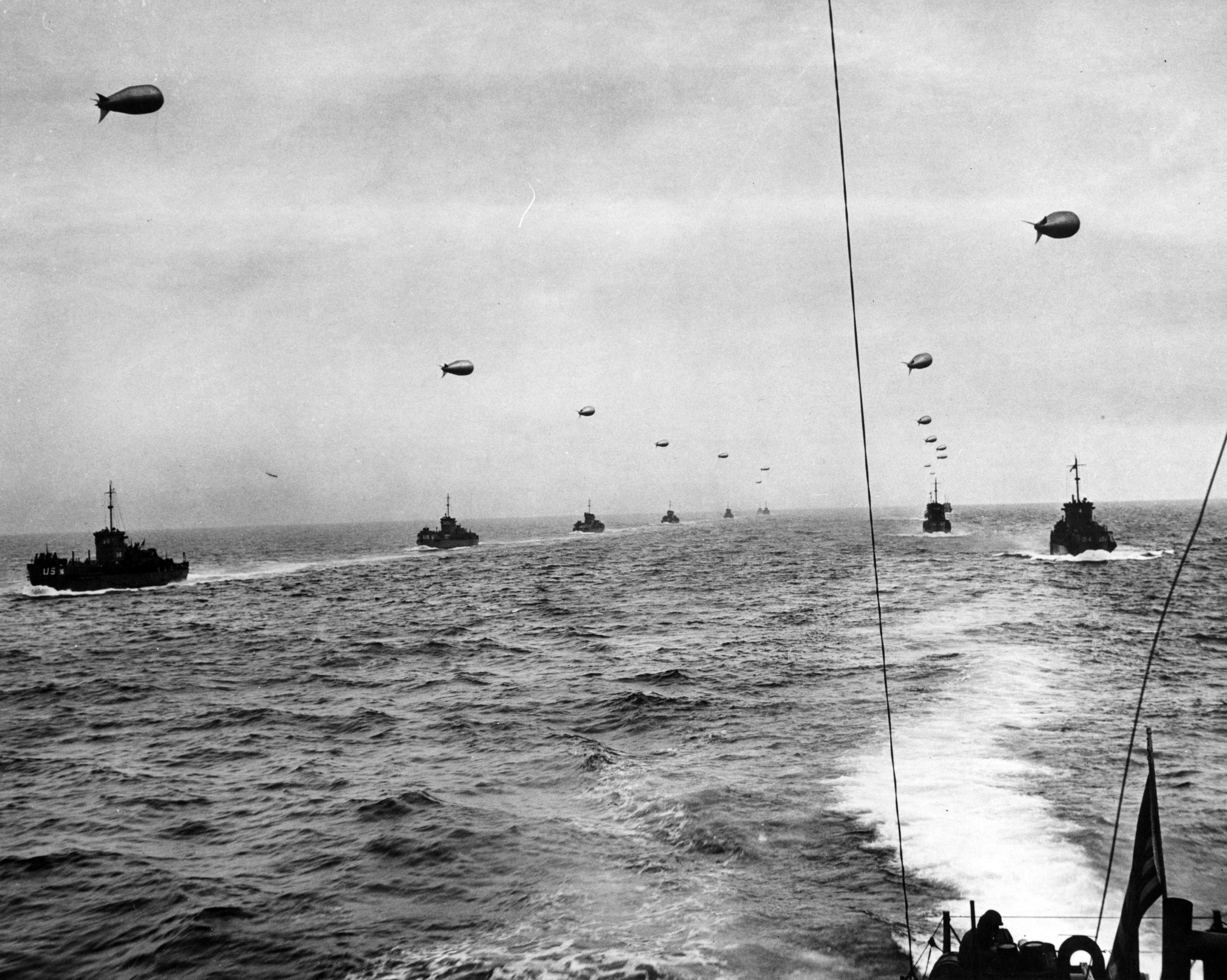
A large landing craft convoy crosses the English Channel on 6 June 1944.

The most famous amphibious assaults of the war, and of all time, were the Normandy landings on 6 June 1944, in which British, Canadian, and US forces landed at Utah, Omaha, Gold, Juno and Sword beaches in the largest amphibious operation in history.

The organizational planning of the landings (Operation Neptune) was in the hands of Admiral Bertram Ramsay. It covered the landing of the troops and their re-supply. Many innovative elements were included in the operation to ensure its success.

Operation Pluto was a scheme developed by Arthur Hartley, chief engineer with the Anglo-Iranian Oil Company, to construct an undersea oil pipeline under the English Channel between England and France to provide logistical support to the landed armies. Allied forces on the European continent required a tremendous amount of fuel. Pipelines were considered necessary to relieve dependence on oil tankers, which could be slowed by bad weather, were susceptible to German submarines, and were also needed in the Pacific War. Geoffrey William Lloyd, the Minister for Petroleum gained the support of Admiral Mountbatten, Chief of Combined Operations for the operation.

Two types of pipeline were developed. The first type was the flexible HAIS pipe with a 3 inch (75 mm) diameter lead core, weighing around 55 long tons per nautical mile (30 t/km), was essentially a development by Siemens Brothers (in conjunction with the National Physical Laboratory) of their existing undersea telegraph cables, and known as HAIS (from Hartley-Anglo-Iranian-Siemens). The second type was a less flexible steel pipe of similar diameter, developed by engineers from the Iraq Petroleum Company and the Burmah Oil Company.

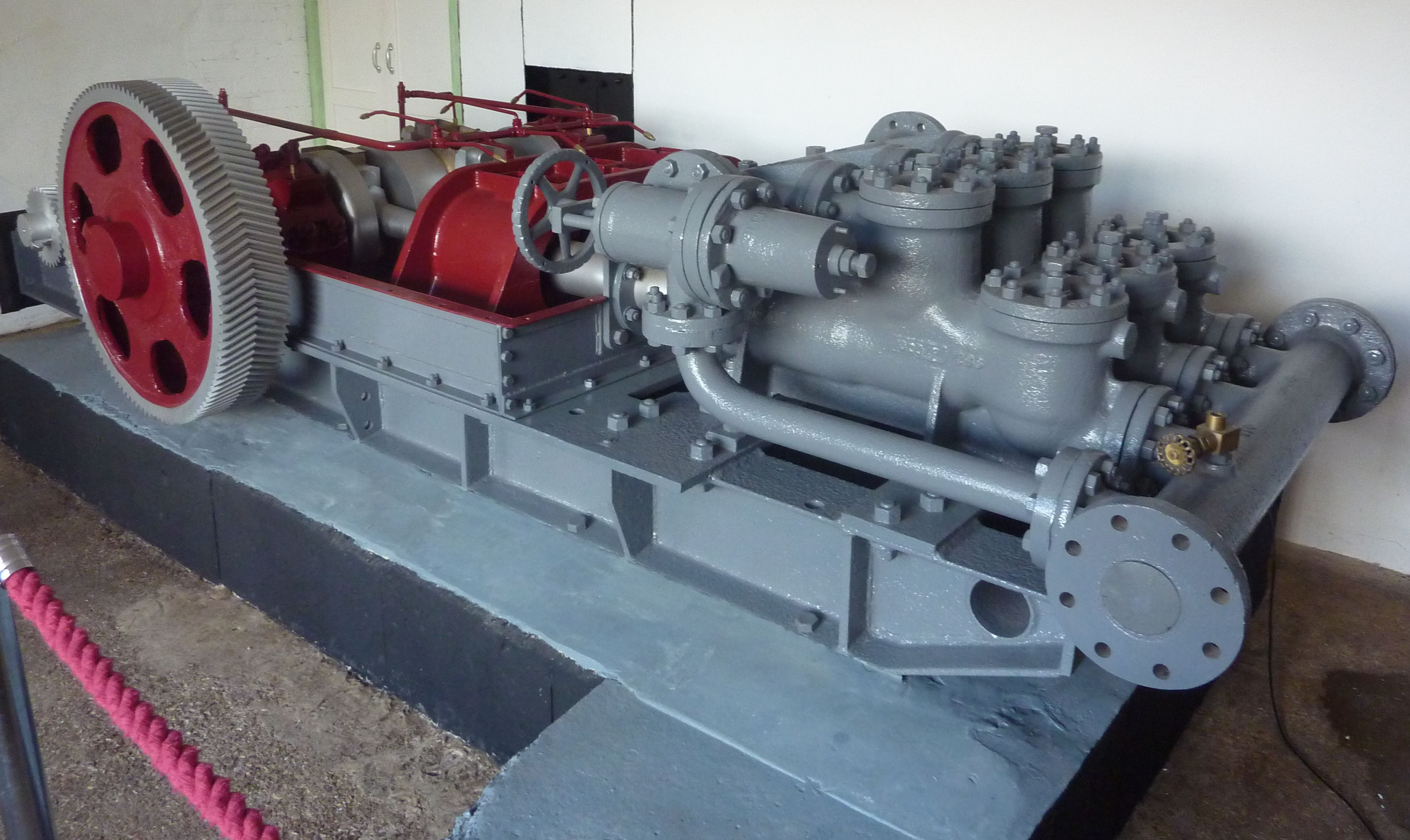
PLUTO Pump from Sandown on the Isle of Wight

In June 1942 the Post Office cable ship Iris laid lengths of both Siemens' and Henleys' cable in the Clyde. The pipeline was completely successful and PLUTO was formally brought into the plans for the invasion of Europe. The project was deemed "strategically important, tactically adventurous, and, from the industrial point of view, strenuous". After full-scale testing of an 83 km (45 nautical mile) HAIS pipe across the Bristol Channel between Swansea in Wales and Watermouth in North Devon, the first line to France was laid on 12 August 1944, over the 130 km (70 nautical miles) from Shanklin Chine on the Isle of Wight across the English Channel to Cherbourg Naval Base. A further HAIS pipe and two HAMELs followed. As the fighting moved closer to Germany, 17 other lines (11 HAIS and 6 HAMEL) were laid from Dungeness to Ambleteuse in the Pas-de-Calais.

In January 1945, 305 tonnes (300 long tons) of fuel was pumped to France per day, which increased tenfold to 3,048 tonnes (3,000 long tons) per day in March, and eventually to 4,000 tons (almost 1,000,000 Imperial gallons) per day. In total, over 781 000 m^{3} (equal to a cube with 92 metre long sides or over 172 million imperial gallons) of gasoline had been pumped to the Allied forces in Europe by VE day, providing a critical supply of fuel until a more permanent arrangement was made, although the pipeline remained in operation for some time after.

Portable harbours were also prefabricated as temporary facilities to allow rapid offloading of cargo onto the beaches during the Allied invasion of Normandy. The Dieppe Raid of 1942 had shown that the Allies could not rely on being able to penetrate the Atlantic Wall to capture a port on the north French coast. The problem was that large ocean-going ships of the type needed to transport heavy and bulky cargoes and stores needed sufficient depth of water under their keels, together with dockside cranes, to off-load their cargo and this was not available except at the already heavily defended French harbours. Thus, the Mulberries were created to provide the port facilities necessary to offload the thousands of men and vehicles, and tons of supplies necessary to sustain Operation Overlord and the Battle of Normandy. The harbours were made up of all the elements one would expect of any harbour: breakwater, piers, roadways etc.

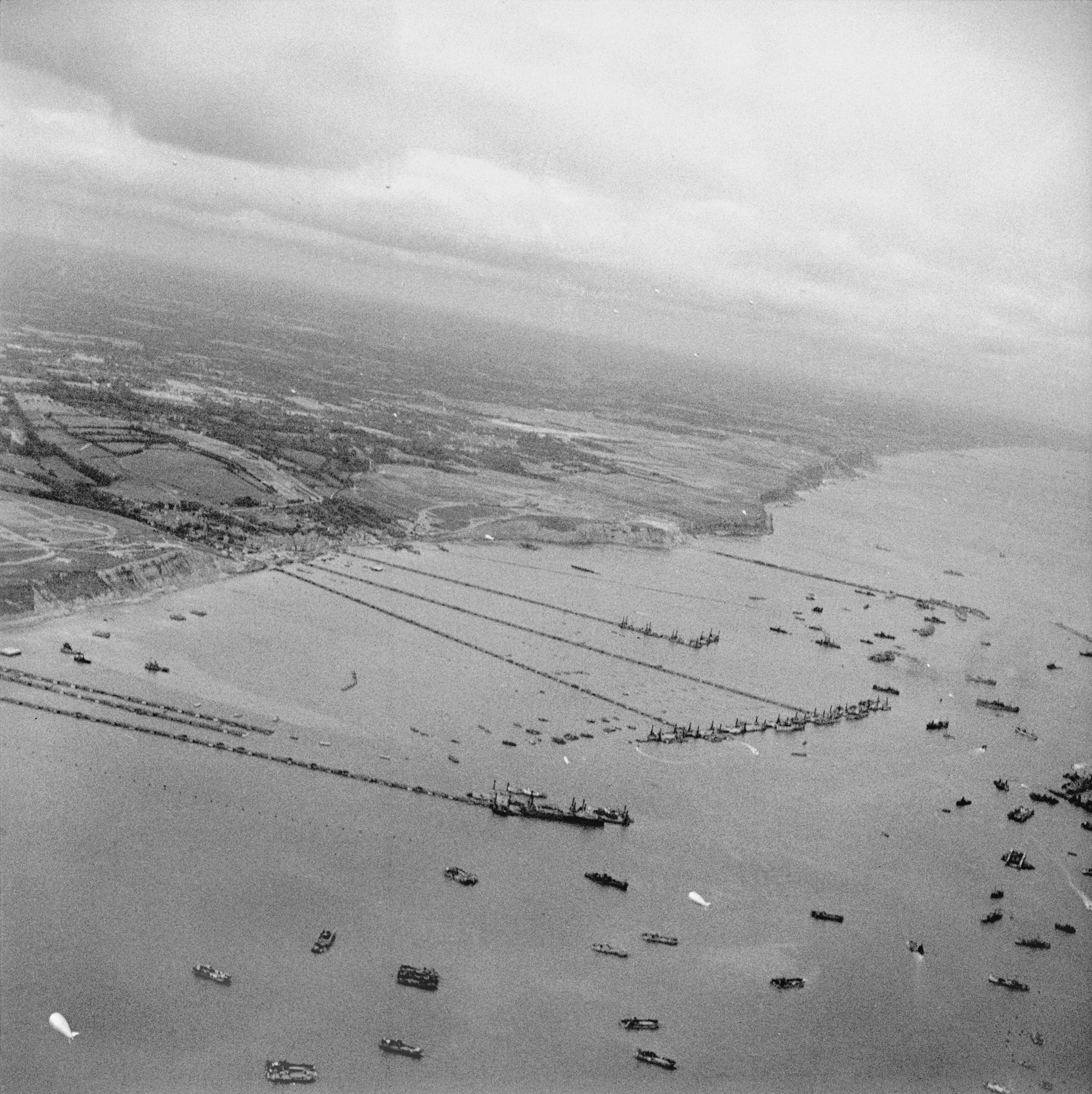
Overall aerial view of the Mulberry B harbour "Port Winston" in September 1944

At a meeting following the Dieppe Raid, Vice-Admiral John Hughes-Hallett declared that if a port could not be captured, then one should be taken across the Channel. The concept of Mulberry harbours began to take shape when Hughes-Hallett moved to be Naval Chief of Staff to the Overlord planners.

The proposed harbours called for many huge caissons of various sorts to build breakwaters and piers and connecting structures to provide the roadways. The caissons were built at a number of locations, mainly existing ship building facilities or large beaches like Conwy Morfa around the British coast. The works were let out to commercial construction firms including Balfour Beatty, Costain, Nuttall, Henry Boot, Sir Robert McAlpine and Peter Lind & Company, who all still operate today, and Cubitts, Holloway Brothers, Mowlem and Taylor Woodrow, who all have since been absorbed into other businesses that are still operating. On completion they were towed across the English Channel by tugs to the Normandy coast at only 4.3 Knots (8 km/h or 5 mph), built, operated and maintained by the Corps of Royal Engineers, under the guidance of Reginald D. Gwyther, who was appointed CBE for his efforts.

By 9 June, just 3 days after D-Day, two harbours codenamed Mulberry "A" and "B" were constructed at Omaha Beach and Arromanches, respectively. However, a large storm on 19 June destroyed the American harbour at Omaha, leaving only the British harbour still intact but damaged, which included damage to the 'Swiss Roll' which had been deployed as the most western floating roadway had to be taken out of service. The surviving Mulberry "B" came to be known as Port Winston at Arromanches. While the harbour at Omaha was destroyed sooner than expected, Port Winston saw heavy use for 8 months—despite being designed to last only 3 months. In the 10 months after D-Day, it was used to land over 2.5 million men, 500,000 vehicles, and 4 million tonnes of supplies providing much needed reinforcements in France.

==== Other ====
Other large amphibious operations in the European theatre of World War II and the war in the Pacific include:

Europe:

Location	Operation	Date	Notes
Norway	Operation Weserübung (German: Unternehmen Weserübung)	9 April 1940	German attack on Norway and Denmark
Cross English Channel	Operation Sea Lion (German: Unternehmen Seelöwe)	planned 20 September 1940	Not carried out after Germany failed to gain air supremacy, postponed indefinitely on 17 September 1940
East Africa	Operation Appearance	16 March 1941	Beach landing at Berbera
Battle of Crete	Operation Mercury (German: Unternehmen Merkur)	20 May 1941	Axis invasion of Crete. Primarily an airborne assault. The battle lasted about 10 days
Crimea	Feodosia Landing	December 1941	Soviet forces established a bridgehead on the Kerch Peninsula which they maintained until May 1942, but failed to prevent the fall of Sevastopol.
Crimea	Yevpatoria assault	January 1942	Stormy weather prevented the reinforcement of Soviet troops from Sevastopol who landed at Yevpatoria and occupied part of the town for 4 days.
North Africa campaign	Operation Torch	8 November 1942	Three Allied task-forces covering the coasts of French Morocco and Algeria
Sicily	Operation Husky	9 July 1943	Largest amphibious operation of World War II in terms of size of landing-zone and number of divisions put ashore on the first day; see also Operation Mincemeat (disinformation), Operation Ladbroke (glider landings) and Operation Fustian (parachute brigade, with glider-borne forces in support)
Salerno	Operation Avalanche	9 September 1943	Also involved two supporting operations: in Calabria (Operation Baytown, 3 Sept) and Taranto (Operation Slapstick, 9 September).
Crimea	Kerch-Eltigen Operation	November 1943	Soviet landings preceding the recapture of the Crimean Peninsula from German and Romanian forces.
Anzio	Operation Shingle	22 January 1944	Bridgehead pinned down until 23 May 1944, when a breakout (Operation Diadem) allowed a move on Rome
Southern France	Operation Dragoon	15 August 1944	Operation Dragoon forced a German retreat and accelerated the liberation of France. See also preliminary effort (Operation Sitka), diversion (Operation Span), airborne operations (1st Airborne Task Force)

Pacific:

Location	Operation	Date	Notes
Malaya	Battle of Kota Bharu	8 December 1941	Following failure to implement Operation Matador (1941), ~5,200 Japanese troops landed on beaches at Kota Bharu
Philippines	Philippines campaign (1941–1942)	8 December 1941	Preliminary landings on Batan Island then Camiguin Island, north of Luzon, and at Vigan, Aparri, and Gonzaga (northern Luzon) were followed by main attack—43,110 men, supported by artillery and approximately 90 tanks, landed at three points along the east coast of Lingayen Gulf
Guadalcanal	Guadalcanal campaign	7 August 1942	
Tarawa	Battle of Tarawa	20 November 1943	
Makin atoll	Battle of Makin	20 November 1943	
Philippines	Philippines Campaign (1944–45)	20 October 1944	After capture of the Gilbert Islands, some of the Marshall Islands, and most of the Marianas Islands, landings on Leyte and Mindoro allowed some 175,000 men to cross the broad beachhead and participate in the Battle of Luzon within a few days
Iwo Jima	Battle of Iwo Jima	19 February 1945	As part of the American invasion of the island of Iwo Jima, designated Operation Detachment, during the Battle of Iwo Jima the U.S. Marines landed on and eventually captured the island of Iwo Jima.
Okinawa	Battle of Okinawa	1 April 1945	The series of battles fought in the Ryukyu Islands, centered on the island of Okinawa, included the largest amphibious assault in the Pacific War during World War II, the 1 April 1945 invasion of the island of Okinawa itself.
Korea	Seishin Landing Operation	13 August 1945	Three Soviet amphibious landings in northern Korea in the rear of the Japanese Kwantung Army
Malaya	Operation Zipper	planned 9 September 1945	British-planned Indian Ocean amphibious assault to capture Port Swettenham as a staging area for a later invasion of Singapore. Cancelled after the Surrender of Japan, replaced by the unopposed Operation Jurist and Operation Mailfist on 28 August 1945.
Japanese home islands	Operation Downfall	planned 1 November 1945	Massive Allied invasion planned for Kyushu and Honshu, would have been the largest amphibious invasion in history. Canceled after the Surrender of Japan, US troops occupy Tokyo unopposed on 28 August 1945 instead

=== Korean War ===
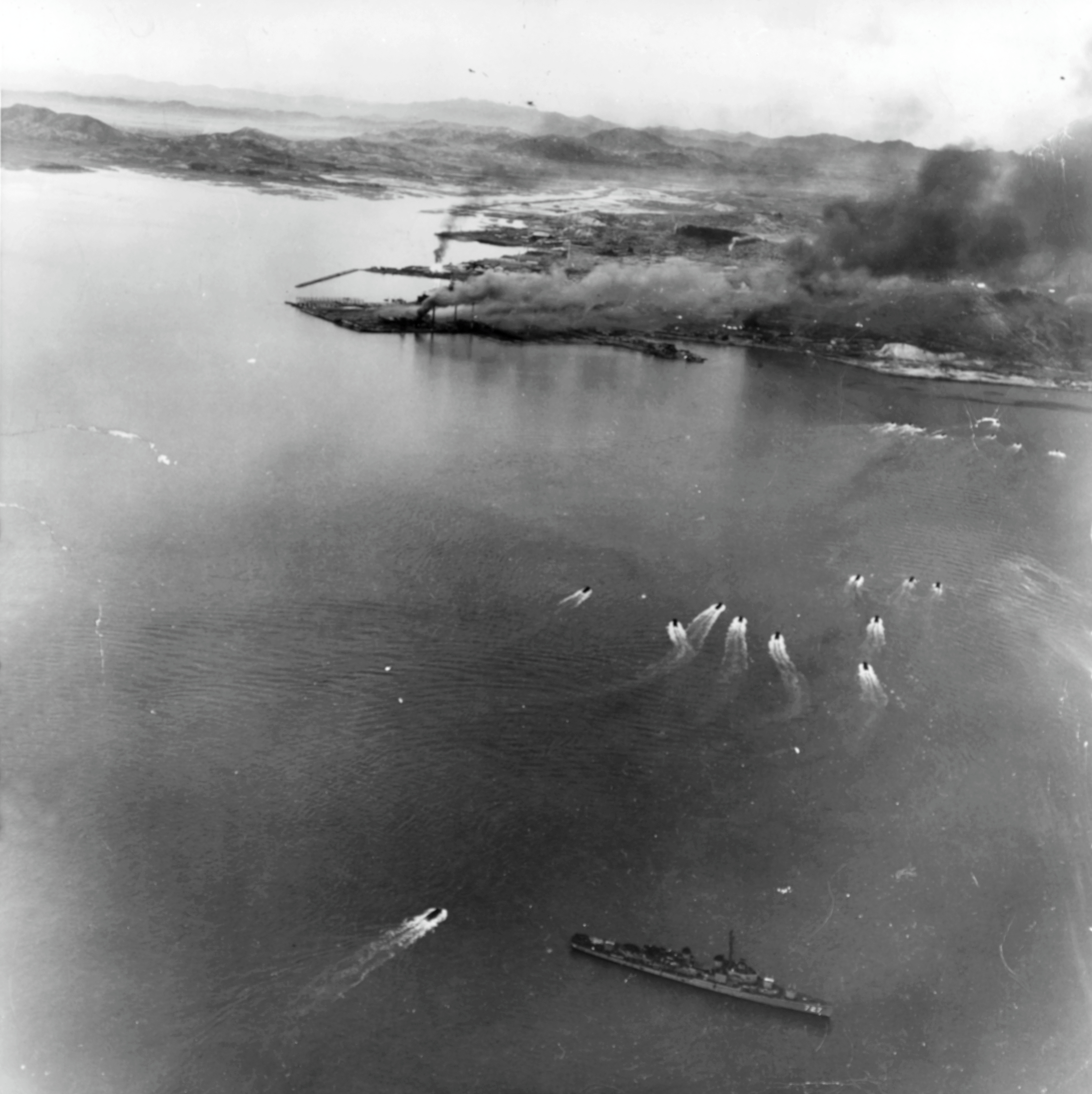
Landing craft approach Blue Beach during the Inchon landings on 15 September 1950, covered by the U.S. Navy destroyer USS De Haven (DD-727) (bottom center).

During the Korean War the U.S. X Corps, consisting of the 1st Marine Division and 7th Infantry Division landed at Inchon. Conceived of and commanded by U.S. General Douglas MacArthur, this landing is considered by many military historians to have been a tactical jewel, one of the most brilliant amphibious maneuvers in history (See analysis in main article).

The success of this battle eventually resulted in link up with U.S. Army forces that broke out of the Pusan perimeter, and led by the 1st Cavalry Division and its Task Force Lynch, cleared much of South Korea. A second landing by the Tenth Corps on the east coast approached the Chosin Reservoir and hydroelectric plants that powered much of Communist China's heavy industry, and led to intervention by Chinese forces on behalf of North Korea. Amphibious landings also took place during the First Indochina War, notably during Operation Camargue, one of the largest of the conflict.

=== Suez Crisis and Falklands War ===
The British Royal Marines made their first post-World War II amphibious assault during the Suez Crisis of 1956 when they successfully landed at Suez on 6 November as part of a joint seaborne/airborne operation code-named Operation Musketeer.

Despite all the progress that was seen during World War II, there were still fundamental limitations in the types of coastline that were suitable for assault. Beaches had to be relatively free of obstacles, and have the right tidal conditions and the correct slope. However, the development of the helicopter fundamentally changed the equation.

The first use of helicopters in an amphibious assault came during the Anglo-French-Israeli invasion of Egypt in 1956 (the Suez War). Two British light fleet carriers were pressed into service to carry helicopters, and a battalion-sized airborne assault was made. Two of the other carriers involved, HMS Bulwark (R08) and HMS Albion, were converted in the late 1950s into dedicated "commando carriers."

Nearly 30 years later in the Falklands War, the 1st Marines Brigade of the Argentine Marine Corps along with Navy's Special Forces performed Operation Rosario landing at Mullet Creek near Stanley on 2 April 1982, while later the Royal Marines' 3 Commando Brigade, (augmented by the British Army's Parachute Regiment) landed at Port San Carlos on 21 May 1982 during Operation Sutton.

=== Landing at Cyprus ===
The Turkish Armed Forces launched an amphibious assault on 20 July 1974, on Kyrenia, following the 1974 Cypriot coup d'état. The Turkish naval force provided naval gunfire support during the landing operation and transported the amphibious forces from the port of Mersin to the island. The Turkish landing forces consisted of around 3,000 troops, tanks, armoured personnel carriers and artillery pieces.

=== Iran-Iraq war ===
During the Iran–Iraq War, the Iranians launched Operation Dawn 8 (Persian: عملیات والفجر ۸), in which 100,000 troops comprising 5 Army divisions and 50,000 men from the IRGC and the Basij advanced in a two-pronged offensive into southern Iraq. Taking place between 9 and 25 February, the assault across the Shatt al-Arab achieved significant tactical and operational surprise. The Iranians launched their assault on the peninsula at night, their men arriving on rubber boats. Iranian Navy SEALs spearheaded the offensive despite a shortage of gear. Prior to this action Iranian Naval Commandos performed reconnaissance of the Faw Peninsula. The Iranian SEALs penetrated an obstacle belt and isolated Iraqi bunkers whose troops had taken cover from the heavy rains inside or were sleeping. Iranian demolition teams detonated charges on the obstacles to create a path for the Iranian infantry waiting to begin their assault.

Not only did the amphibious landings provide a significant lodgement behind Iraq's tactical front, but they also created a psychological shock wave throughout the Persian Gulf region. Soon after the initial landings, Iranian combat engineers were able to construct bridges to improve the flow of ground troops into the lodgement area. Iran managed to maintain their foothold in Al-Faw against several Iraqi counter-offensives and chemical attacks for another month despite heavy casualties until a stalemate was reached. The Faw Peninsula was later recaptured by Iraqi forces, by the massive and illegal use of chemical weapons, the same day as the US launched Operation Praying Mantis on Iran, destroying their navy.

=== Persian Gulf War ===
During the Persian Gulf War, Assault Craft Unit 5 was able to position U.S. Marine and naval support off the coast of Kuwait and Saudi Arabia. This force was composed of 40 amphibious assault ships, the largest such force to be assembled since the Battle of Inchon. The objective was to fix the six Iraqi divisions deployed along the Kuwaiti coast. The purpose behind this amphibious maneuver (known as an amphibious demonstration) was to prevent 6 Iraqi divisions poised for the defense of the littorals from being able to actively engage in combat at the real front. The operation was extremely successful in keeping more than 41,000 Iraqi forces from repositioning to the main battlefield. As a result, the Marines maneuvered through the Iraq defense of southern Kuwait and outflanked the Iraqi coastal defense forces.

=== Elem War ===
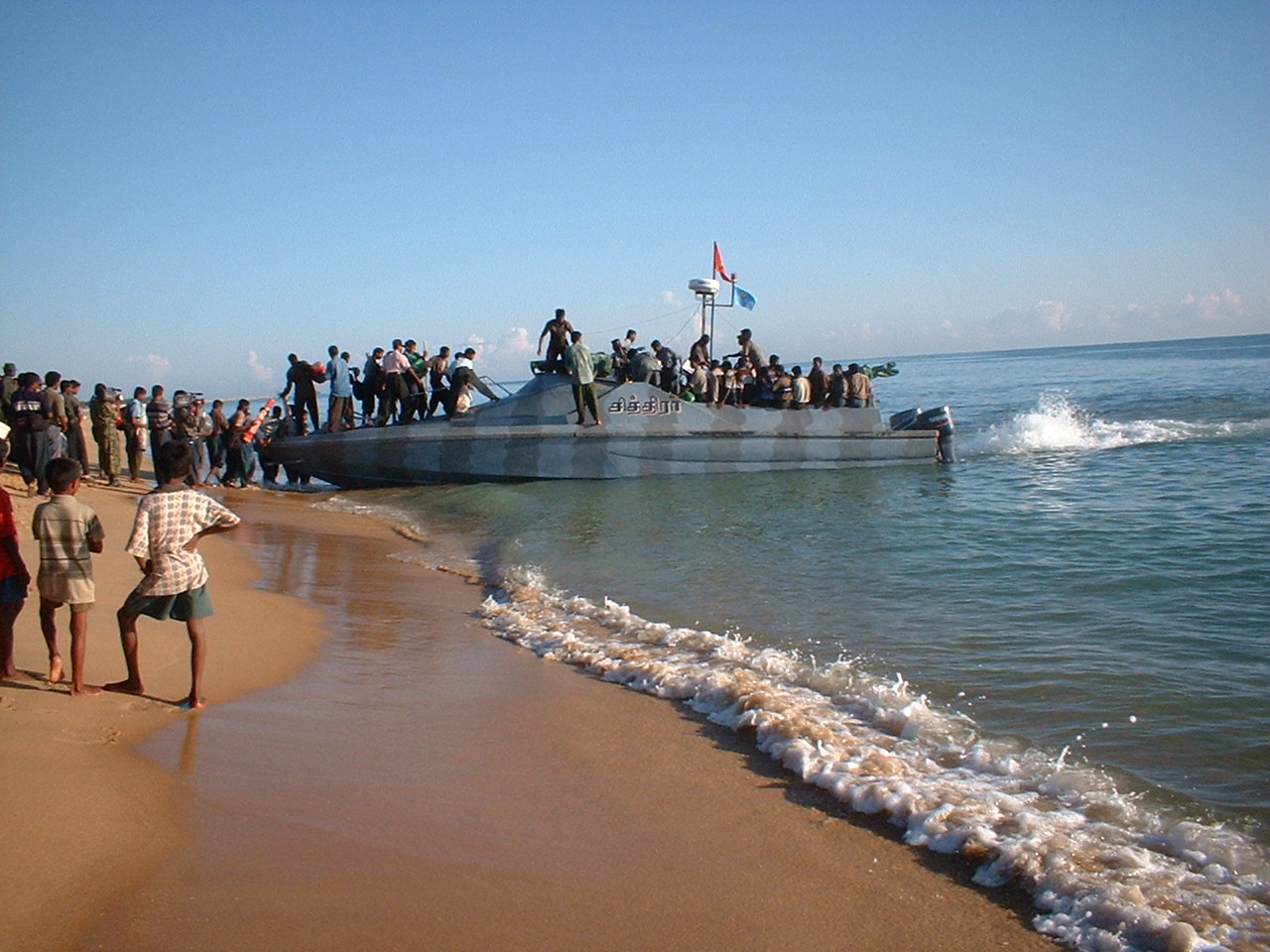
LTTE cadres embarking a Sea Tigers boat.

During the Sri Lankan civil war the LTTE used amphibious warfare in some of their successful battles such as Battle of Pooneryn in 1992 and Second Battle of Elephant Pass in 2000 to overrun and capture Sri Lankan Army bases.

=== Iraq War ===
An amphibious assault was carried out by Royal Marines, U.S. Marines and units of the Polish special forces when they landed at the Al-Faw Peninsula on 20 March 2003 during the Iraq War.

=== Invasion of Anjouan ===
On 25 March 2008, Operation Democracy in Comoros was launched in the Comoros by government and African Union troops. The amphibious assault led to the ousting of Colonel Bacar's government, which had taken over the autonomous state of Adjouan.

=== Battle of Kismayo (2012) ===
From 28 September to 1 October 2012, the Kenya defence Force launched an assault in conjuncture with allied forces from Africa to liberate the city of Kismayo from insurgent control in a first of its kind by an African military. The operation, known as Operation Sledge Hammer, started with the landing of Somali and Kenyan troops outside the city of Kismayo. By 1 October, the coalition forces were able to push Al-Shabaab out of the city.

== See also ==
- List of marines and similar forces
- Marines
- Navy
- Raid (military)#Seaborne
- US Amphibious Training Base
