= Yevpatoria assault =

WWII amphibious assault by Soviet Union

- Part of the Eastern Front of World War II
Date	5 – 8 January 1942
Location	Crimea, Russian SFSR, Soviet Union
Result	German victory

Belligerents
Soviet Union	Germany

Strength
700 marines 3 × 45-mm ATG; 2 × T-37A; Soviet partisans	

The Yevpatoria assault was an amphibious assault during World War II by Soviet marine battalion on 5 January 1942 at Yevpatoria aiming at diverting part of German troops attacking Sevastopol and the Kerch Peninsula.

== History ==
The assault was undertaken by a reinforced Marine battalion (700 soldiers under the command of Cpt G. K. Businov and commissar A. S. Boyko).

- one battalion of 2nd Marine regiment (under the command of Cpt G. K. Businov)
- reconnaissance unit (under the command of Cpt V. V. Tomichev)
- several militsiya officers from Yevpatoria

They were carried to destination by a convoy of ships from the Black Sea Fleet under the command of Frigate captain N. V. Buslaev.

- minesweeper "Exploder" (базовый тральщик «Взрыватель»)
- seven patrol boats of "MO IV" class (МО-036, МО-041, МО-062, МО-081, МО-0102, МО-0105, МО-0125)
- tugboat "SP-14" (морской буксир «СП-14»)

The convoy left Sevastopol on 4 January 1942 at 11:30 pm and proceeded to the landings between 3 am and 6 am on the 5th. The assaillants were able to take control of the southern part of the city. Reinforcements sent by the opponent included an infantry regiment two battalions and batteries. A stormy weather prevented the soviet to get back up. They battled during 3 days against superior forces. Meanwhile, in the city occurred an uprising which participants along with local partisans joined the fight alongside the soviet troopers. Among 700 assaillants remained alive a mere hundred by the time the battle ended. The operation succeeded in distracting German forces from Sevastopol as well as allowing for troops on the Kerch peninsula more to prepare to withstand German assaults.

The marines taken prisoners along with some 3000 civilians were shot later on the Red Hill part of the 10,400 people shot here during the war.

== Aftermath ==
A sculpture outside the city on the sealine recalls the move. It represents the soldiers emerging from a wave. Another monument stands at the angle between Demychev and Revolution streets. A street is named after the feat in Yevpatoria.
