= Armed merchant ship =

Vessel built for civilian purposes, carrying weaponry

The term armed merchant ship may describe a number of similar ship modifications intended for significantly different missions. The term armed merchantman is generally used.

- East Indiaman describes late 18th and early 19th-century sailing ships engaged in trade while carrying guns similar to contemporary warships.
- Defensively Equipped Merchant Ships were civilian-crewed cargo ships carrying a small number of military personnel to operate an anti-submarine gun and anti-aircraft machine guns during the world wars of the early 20th century.
- Auxiliary cruisers were cargo ships commissioned as naval vessels with a military crew, converted to carry the guns of a light cruiser, and sometimes used as Merchant raiders.
- Armed merchant cruisers were fast passenger liners commissioned as naval vessels with a military crew and converted to carry the guns of a light cruiser.
- Naval trawlers were fishing trawlers commissioned as naval vessels with a military crew and equipped for minesweeping or anti-submarine escort.
- Q-ships were small civilian ships commissioned as naval vessels with a military crew, but retaining their original appearance while carrying concealed anti-submarine weapons.
- Armed boarding steamers were merchant steamers converted by the United Kingdom for boarding enemy vessels.

== Sources ==
- Hague, Arnold (2000). The Allied Convoy System 1939–1945. Naval Institute Press. ISBN 1-55750-019-3.
- Lenton, H.T. & Colledge, J.J. (1968). British and Dominion Warships of World War II. Doubleday and Company.
- Morison, Samuel Eliot (1975). History of United States Naval Operations in World War II, Volume I The Battle of the Atlantic 1939–1943. Little, Brown and Company.
- Schmalenbach, Paul (1979). German Raiders. Naval Institute Press.
