= Operation Dryad =

British Commando raid during the Second World War

- Part of North West Europe Campaign
Date	2–3 September 1942
Location	Casquets, Channel Islands
Result	British victory

Belligerents
United Kingdom	Germany

Commanders and leaders
(United Kingdom) Major Gus March-Phillipps	(Nazi Germany) Unknown

Units involved
No. 62 Commando	

Strength
12	7

Casualties and losses
2 minor injuries	7 captured

Operation Dryad was a raid on the Casquets lighthouse in the Channel Islands by British Commandos during World War II. The Commandos captured the lighthouse and its occupants and departed leaving no trace that anyone had ever been there.

== Background ==
The Casquets Lighthouse was built in 1724, and is located 6 miles (9.7 km) west of the island of Alderney in the Channel Islands. It is sited among some of the fastest ocean currents in the English Channel. The Lighthouse has a 88 feet (27 m) tower and two shorter towers on a barren rock. After the German occupation of the Channel Islands in 1940, they decided to man the lighthouse with an observation post and a naval radio station while allowing the lighthouse to be turned on for passing German ships. The crew were rotated every 3 months.

Its isolated location made it a perfect objective for a commando raid. Seven previous attempts to raid the lighthouse were abandoned due to weather conditions. The commandos selected to carry out the raid belonged to No. 62 Commando also known as the Small Scale Raiding Force (SSRF). The raid was to occur on the night of 2/3 September 1942 with the objective of capturing prisoners.

The raiding party consisted of 12 men from the SSRF, the commanding officer Major Gus March-Phillipps, his second in command Captain Geoffrey Appleyard, and others including Captain Graham Hayes, Captain Peter Kemp (writer), Sergeant Winter, Private Anders Lassen, Dutch Lieutenant Henk Brinkgreve, and Sergeant Geoffrey Spencer.

== Mission ==
Sailing from Portland aboard HM MTB 344, a motor torpedo boat nicknamed The Little Pisser because of its outstanding turn of speed at 21.00 hrs arriving close to Les Casquets at 22.45 hrs. An Alderney man and Special Operations Executive operative, "Bonnie" Newton acted as pilot. After anchoring, the landing party rowed ashore, arriving just after midnight, Appleyard was the first to leap ashore and tied their boat forward and Hayes was in control of the stern-line, which had been attached to the kedge-anchor that had been dropped on approach to prevent the boat from being smashed against the rocks. All the landing party made it safely ashore without any damage to the boat. Appleyard handed the bowline to another and Hayes remained in control of the stern-line as the raiding party departed.

The commandos made their way through barbed wire up the steep rocky surface to the lighthouse courtyard unchallenged. Once in the courtyard the group dispersed to their prearranged objectives. Appleyard and Sergeant Winter dashed up the spiral staircase to the tower light only to find it unoccupied. The garrison was totally surprised. Appleyard said, "I have never seen men so amazed and terrified at the same time." Three were sleeping, two were just turning in and two others were on duty, the seven Germans were taken prisoner without a shot being fired. One German, who was in charge of the lighthouse operation, fainted at the sight of the commandos. Another was initially thought to be a woman because he was wearing a hairnet.

Weapons found included an Oerlikon 20 mm cannon, rifles and stick grenades, which were all dumped in the sea. The radio was smashed with an axe. The boat they had arrived in was designed to take a maximum of 10, now with 19, it was difficult, but they managed. Appleyard suffered an accident and fractured his tibia as he re-boarded their boat.

Setting sail at 01.35 hrs, the seven prisoners, some still in their pyjamas, were taken to England, arriving at Portland at 04.00 hrs. Several codebooks, logs, diaries and letters were found and taken back for analysis. The code books proved to be of little value, given that the code had already been broken, and indeed the Germans, realising that these books had been captured, increased their wireless security. The effect of the raid may have been counter-productive.

== Aftermath ==
It was a few days before the Germans were aware of a problem. When a boat arrived, they found the lighthouse deserted. An order to remove all lighthouse crews did not last long when it was realised the benefits outweighed the risks. The Casquets lighthouse was re-armed with a 2.5cm Pak, five machine guns and had a larger crew of 24 installed.

The next raid for the SSRF was 12/13 September Operation Aquatint. The raiding party led by March-Phillipps would all be killed or captured. Winter and Hayes were captured, Hayes after having succeeded in crossing the French–Spanish border was later executed in Fresnes prison.

In October 1942 Appleyard now in command of the SSRF was in charge of a raid on Sark Operation Basalt where four German prisoners who had been tied up were shot and killed as they tried to escape. Adolf Hitler, incensed with the Commando raids, issued the Commando Order which ordered that all captured commandos in or out of uniform were to be shot. He also protested the binding and killing of German prisoners, and gave orders to shackle British prisoners of war who were captured during the Dieppe raid. Appleyard later joined the Special Air Service (SAS); he was posted missing believed killed when returning from a SAS mission the plane he was travelling on was lost over the Mediterranean. Private Anders Lassen would be commissioned and win a posthumous Victoria Cross while serving with the Special Boat Squadron of the SAS in Italy 1945.

== Bibliography ==
- Richards, Brooks; Foot, M R D (2002). Clandestine Sea Operations to Brittany: 1940 - 1944. Routledge. ISBN 0-7146-5316-0.
- Brown, Gordon (2008). Wartime Courage: Stories of Extraordinary Courage by Ordinary People in World War Two. Bloomsbury Publishing Plc. ISBN 978-0-7475-9607-3.
- Forty, George, Channel Islands at War: A German Perspective , (2005), Ian Allan Publishing, ISBN 978-0711030718
