= Operation Postmaster =

Naval operation during the Second World War

- Part of SOE operations and the Battle of the Atlantic
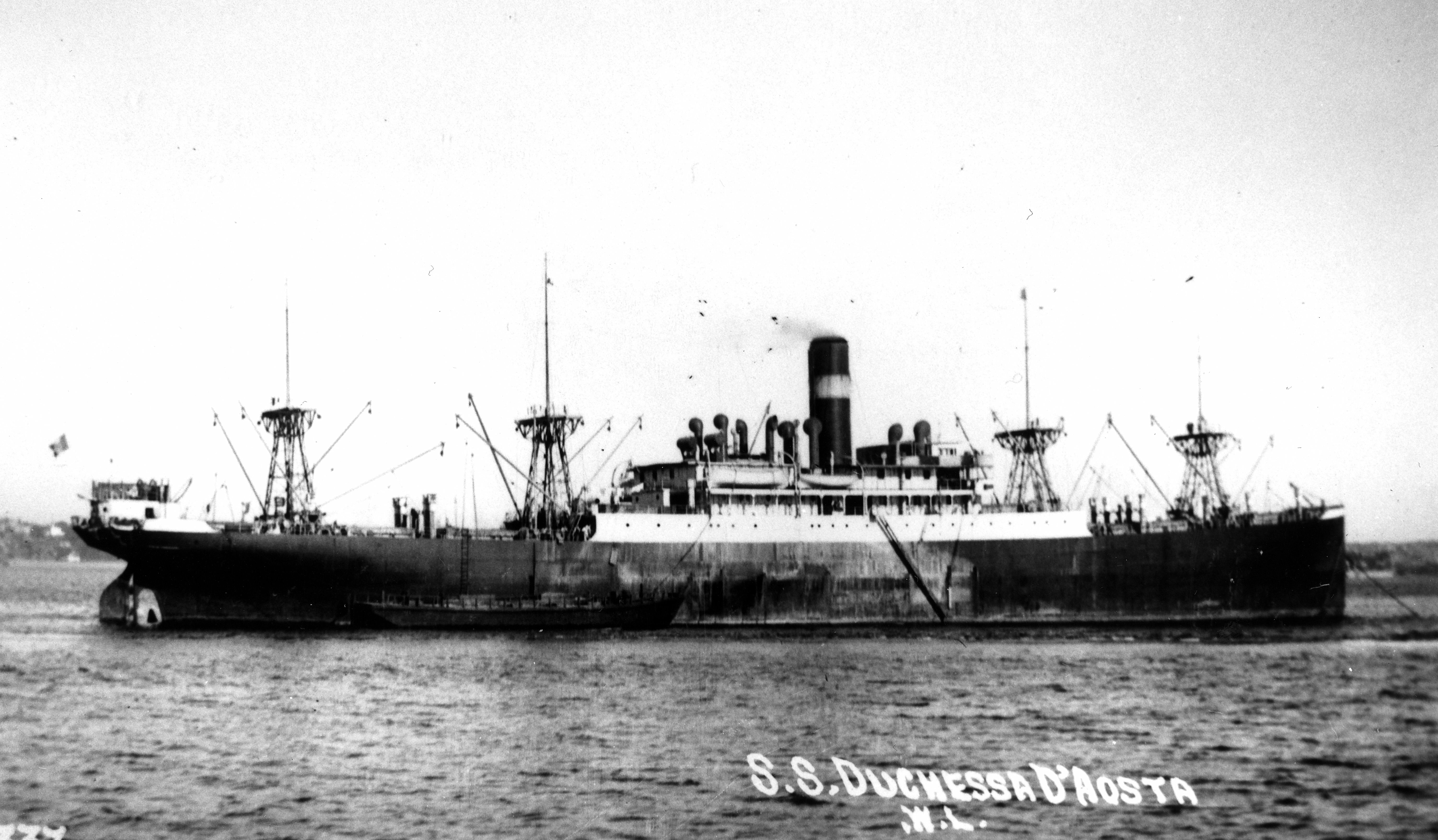
- The Italian cargo liner Duchessa d'Aosta captured during the raid
Date	14 January 1942
Location	Santa Isabel, Fernando Po, Spanish Guinea 3°45′40″N 8°46′50″E
Result	British victory

Belligerents
United Kingdom	Germany; Italy

Commanders and leaders
Gus March-Phillipps	Captain Specht

Strength
11 men Small Scale Raiding Force; 4 men Special Operations Executive; 17 local volunteers HMS Violet	46 crew Duchessa d'Aosta; Bibundi crew; Likomba crew

Casualties and losses
None	One merchant ship and 2 smaller vessels captured; 29 crew captured

Operation Postmaster was a British special operation conducted on the Spanish colony of Fernando Po, now known as Bioko, off West Africa in the Gulf of Guinea, during the Second World War. The mission was carried out by the Small Scale Raiding Force (SSRF) and the Special Operations Executive (SOE) in January 1942. Their objective was to board the Italian and German ships in the harbour and sail them to Lagos. The SSRF under the command of Major Gus March-Phillipps left Britain in August 1941 and sailed the Brixham trawler, Maid Honor, to the Spanish colony.

The British authorities in the area refused to support the raid, which they considered a breach of Spanish neutrality. Permission for the operation to go ahead eventually came from the Foreign Office in London. On 14 January 1942, while the ships' officers were attending a party arranged by an SOE agent, the commandos entered the port aboard two tugs, overpowered the ships' crews and sailed off with the ships, including the Italian merchant vessel Duchessa d'Aosta. The raid boosted SOE's reputation at a critical time and demonstrated its ability to plan and conduct secret operations no matter the political consequences.

== Background ==
In 1941 the Admiralty started receiving reports that German submarines were using the rivers in Vichy French parts of Africa as a base for refuelling. The unit selected to investigate the reports was the Small Scale Raiding Force (SSRF) also known as No. 62 Commando. The SSRF was formed in 1941, and consisted of a small group of 55 commando-trained personnel working with the Special Operations Executive (SOE). While being under operational control of Combined Operations Headquarters, No. 62 Commando was under the command of Major Gus March-Phillipps.

Maid Honor, a 65-ton Brixham yacht trawler, left Poole harbour on 9 August 1941, bound for West Africa. The five man crew were under the command of March-Phillipps. The remainder of the SSRF under the command of Captain Geoffrey Appleyard had departed earlier aboard a troop transport ship. On 20 September 1941 after six weeks under sail, Maid Honor arrived at Freetown, Sierra Leone. Freetown was the agreed rendezvous for both groups, Appleyard's party having arrived at the end of August. After Maid Honor's arrival in Freetown the search for the German submarine bases started. Sailing into the many rivers and deltas in the area, they failed to locate any submarines or evidence of a submarine base.

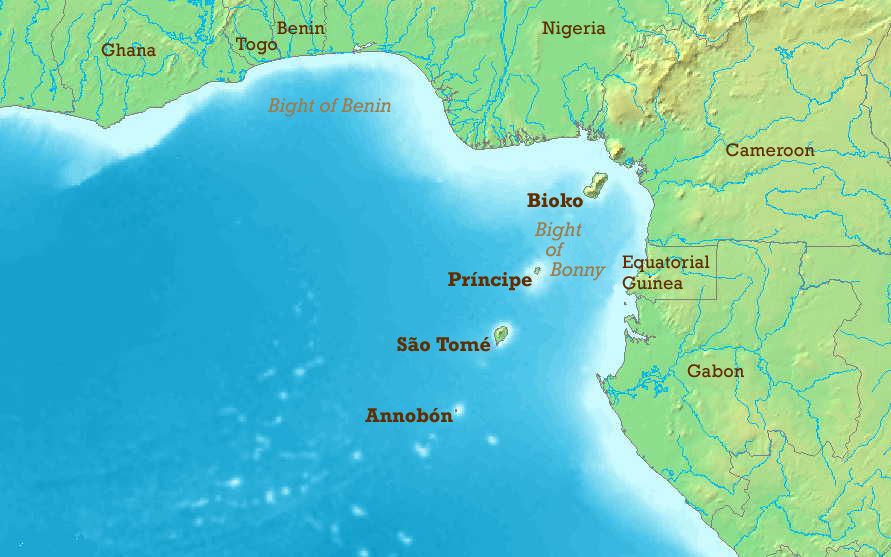
Gulf of Guinea. Fernando Po, now called Bioko, is the island nearest the mainland.

SOE maintained a presence in West Africa, where it could observe Vichy French, Spanish and Portuguese territories with the intention of identifying and hindering any activities that threatened Britain's colonial possessions. While the commandos were searching for the German submarine bases, SOE agents had become aware of three vessels in the port of Santa Isabel on the Spanish island of Fernando Po 30 kilometres (19 mi) off the coast of Africa near the border of Nigeria and Cameroon.

The ships were the Italian 7,872 GRT merchant vessel Duchessa d'Aosta, built in 1921, the large German tug Likomba and a diesel-powered barge Bibundi. Duchessa d'Aosta had a radio which was considered a threat, with the potential to provide details of Allied naval movements. Her declared cargo was 3 million pounds of wool, 316,610 pounds of hides and skins, 1.3 million pounds of tanning materials, 4 million pounds of copra, 544,660 pounds of crude asbestos fibre and over 1.1 million ingots of electrolytic copper. The first page of the ship's cargo manifest was not presented to the port authorities and the ship's captain refused to provide them with any details, which led to speculation it was also carrying arms or ammunition. In his visits to the island, SOE agent Leonard Guise kept the ships under observation, and in August 1941 submitted a plan to seize Likomba and disable Duchessa d'Aosta. Approval for the military operation in a neutral port was given by the Admiralty on 20 November 1941.

To transport the raiders to the island, two tugs, Vulcan and Nuneaton, were provided by the Governor of Nigeria, Sir Bernard Bourdillon. The raiding force would consist of 32 men: four SOE agents, 11 commandos from the SSRF and 17 men recruited from the local population to crew the two tugs. The mission suffered a blow when the British General Officer Commanding (GOC) West Africa Command, General Sir George Giffard, refused to support the mission. He declined to release the 17 men required, stating it would compromise some unnamed plans he had in mind, and that the act would be seen as piracy and could lead to repercussions. Responding to the concerns of the GOC West Africa, the Admiralty suspended the operation. The Foreign Office was also not in favour of the operation, nor was the British Embassy in Madrid, which was concerned about the possible reactions of the Spanish government. The final go-ahead, eventually supported by the Foreign Office, was not given until 6 January 1942, on the grounds that, while suspicion of British involvement in the raid was inevitable, what counted was the avoidance of any tangible proof. As a safeguard the Admiralty also dispatched HMS Violet, a Flower-class corvette, to intercept the vessels at sea, which would provide the cover story that they had been intercepted while trying to make their way home to Europe.

== Mission ==
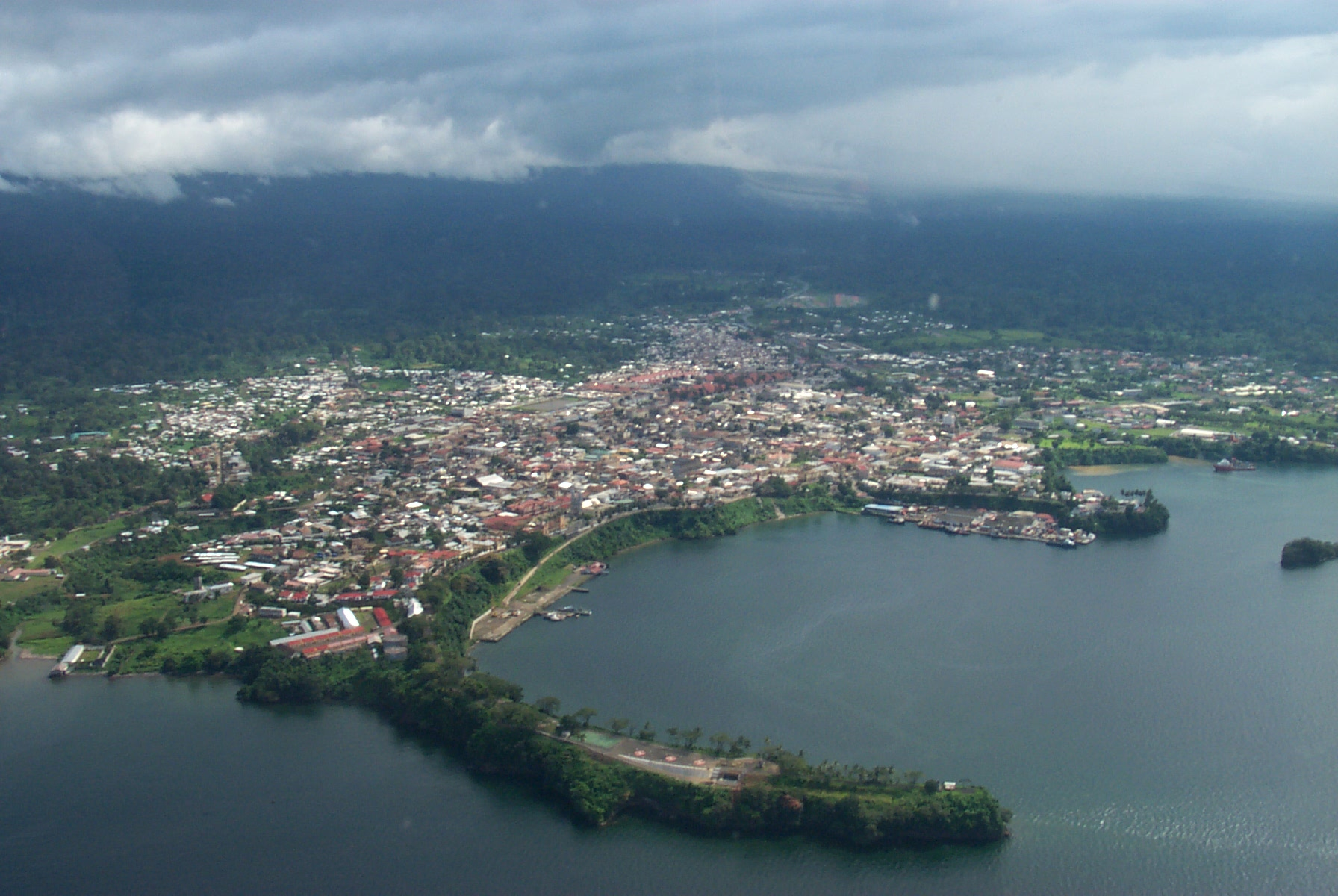
Santa Isabel harbour c. 2007

SOE agent Richard Lippett obtained employment with the shipping company John Holt & Co (Liverpool), which had business offices on the island. In that post, he made preparations for the raid. He became aware that the crew of Duchessa d'Aosta were in the habit of accepting invitations to parties ashore and had held their own party aboard ship on 6 January. Under the guise of a party-goer, Lippett gained information about the readiness of the ship for sea, crew numbers, and the watch arrangements.

=== Santa Isabel harbour ===
The raiders left Lagos in their two tugs on the morning of 11 January. While en route, they practised lowering folbots (folding kayaks) and boarding ships at sea, under the command of Captain Graham Hayes. They approached Santa Isabel harbour and at 23:15 and 23:30 hours on 14 January; both tugs were in position 180 metres (590 ft) outside the harbour. Onshore, Lippett had arranged a dinner party for the officers from Duchessa d'Aosta; 12 Italian officers and two German officers from Likomba attended.

The boarding parties assembled on the decks of the two tugs as they entered the harbour. Vulcan, with March-Phillipps and his second in command Appleyard on board, headed for Duchessa d'Aosta. As they approached, a few men could be seen on the after deck of the merchant vessel, but they seemed to take no notice of the tug other than to shine a torch in its direction.

At the same time, folbots under the command of Hayes from Nuneaton, paddled towards Likomba and Bibundi, which were moored together. Challenged by a watchman on Bibundi, they persuaded him with their reply that it was the ship's captain coming back on board. The men from the folbots boarded Bibundi, and the two-man crew on watch jumped overboard. After attaching explosive charges on the anchor chain, the commandos guided Nuneaton alongside Likomba to take her and Bibundi in tow.

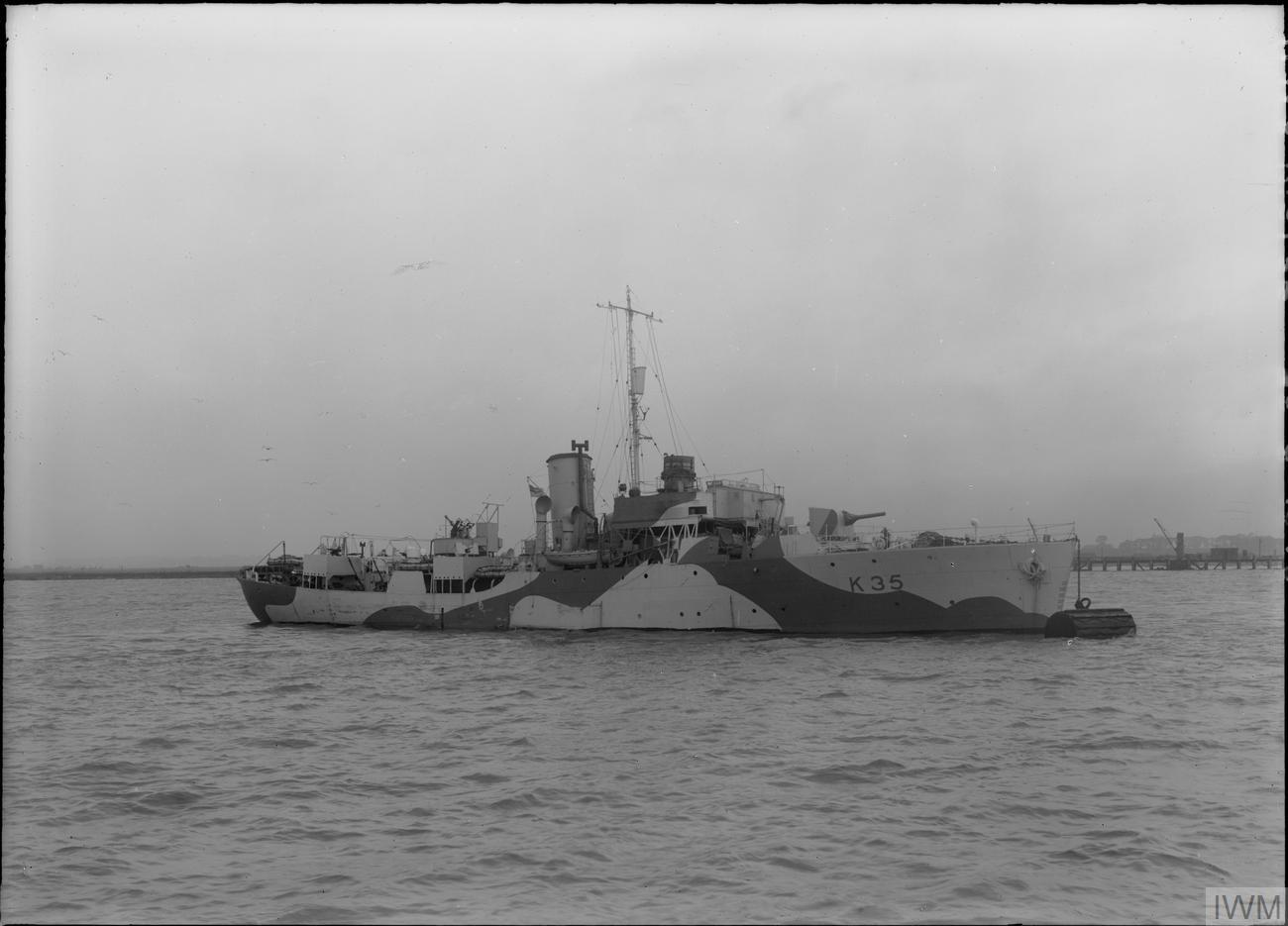
The Flower-class corvette HMS Violet

As soon as the tow was ready, the charges were detonated, releasing the anchors, and Nuneaton started to tow Likomba out of the harbour.

=== Capture of the Duchessa d'Aosta ===
Eleven men from Vulcan boarded Duchessa d'Aosta. While one group attached charges on the anchor chains, another group searched below decks, collecting prisoners. After the commandos blew the anchor chains, Vulcan started to tow Duchessa d'Aosta out of the harbour. The explosions had alerted the population of the town, who started to gather on the pier, but no attempts were made to stop the ships from leaving. Several anti-aircraft emplacements opened fire at imagined targets, believing the explosions to have been caused by an aerial attack, but the six-inch guns protecting the harbour from attack from the sea remained silent. From entering the harbour to leaving with the ships under tow, the operation had taken 30 minutes, without any losses to the raiding party.

Out at sea on 15 January, March-Phillipps established a routine of watches and placed guards on the 29 prisoners they had taken. During the evening they started to have trouble with the tugs' engines and the tow ropes to the captured vessels. The next day Vulcan and Duchessa d'Aosta reached the rendezvous point, and Duchessa d'Aosta was "captured at sea" by HMS Violet. Nuneaton, suffering from engine trouble, managed to contact the Nigerian collier Ilorin by semaphore, which in turn contacted Lagos, and a ship was dispatched to tow them into port.

== Aftermath ==
The Special Operations Executive had now demonstrated their ability to undertake operations, no matter the political consequences. Hugh Dalton, the government minister in charge of SOE, informed the British prime minister Winston Churchill of the outcome of the raid. He also stated his belief that "other neutral governments would be impressed that Britain would, if needed, disregard the legal formalities of war in their efforts to succeed". The agent in charge of SOE Africa station submitted a report to the head of SOE Colin Gubbins reflecting on the success of Postmaster: "perhaps next time it will not be necessary for prolonged negotiations before undertaking a 30-minute operation".

=== Spanish and Axis reaction ===
The Spanish government was furious about the raid, which was seen as a breach of the country's neutrality; Foreign Minister Ramón Serrano Suñer described the operation as an

intolerable attack on our sovereignty, no Spaniard can fail to be roused by this act of piracy committed in defiance of every right and within water under our jurisdiction. Do not be surprised, if we return the answer which the case demands—that of arms.

The Spanish press condemned the operation, with the Falangist newspaper Arriba publishing an editorial on 17 January describing the raid as an infringement of Spanish sovereignty and warning that further violations would be resisted by force. Two days later the Spanish Ministry of Foreign Affairs lodged a formal diplomatic protest with the British embassy, arguing that the vessels had been seized from a neutral port in contravention of international law. Spain demanded the return of the captured ships, their crews and cargoes. The British government rejected the protest, maintaining that its naval forces had intercepted the vessels on the high seas and denied any responsibility for their disappearance from Santa Isabel. Despite the diplomatic confrontation, the captured vessels remained in British hands.

The incident also provoked criticism from Nazi Germany and Fascist Italy, whose governments questioned Spain's ability to protect Axis shipping in its colonial ports. In Germany radio stations reported that a..."British destroyer had entered the harbour and dropped depth charges to blow up the anchor cables and the ship's crew were shot" and the 21 January 1942 edition of Völkischer Beobachter published an article with the headline "British Denials – Admiralty Lies on Act of Piracy". British Naval Intelligence issued their own communique:

In view of the German allegations that Allied naval forces have executed a cutting-out operation against Axis ships in the Spanish port of Santa Isabel, Fernando Po, the British Admiralty considers it necessary to state that no British or Allied ship was in the vicinity...As a result... of the German Broadcast, the British Commander-in-Chief dispatched reconnaissance patrols to cover the area. A report has now been received that a large unidentified vessel has been sighted, and British naval vessels are proceeding to the spot to make investigations."

On Fernando Po, Richard Lippett, who had remained on the island, was taken in for questioning by the Spanish authorities on 17 January. He managed to persuade them he had nothing to do with the departure of the ships, nor had he spent any money on the party for the ships' officers. He was released from custody on 27 January, but was refused permission to leave the island. He finally left secretly by canoe, arriving in British territory on 1 March.

=== Post Postmaster ===
The details of the raid were being kept secret even from the British chiefs of staff, who were only informed, on 18 January 1942, that Duchessa d'Aosta had been intercepted 230 miles (370 km) offshore and was being taken to Lagos.

Maid Honor was left in Lagos and eventually sold to the Sierra Leone government as a converted trawler. Duchess d'Aosta was sailed to Greenock and then managed by Canadian Pacific as the Empire Yukon for the Ministry of War Transport. Likomba was managed by the Elder Dempster Lines, which renamed it Malakel in 1947 and then sold it to Liberia in 1948.

After the raid March-Phillipps was awarded the Distinguished Service Order, Hayes was awarded the Military Cross, and Appleyard a Bar to his Military Cross; Lippett and Guise were each appointed Member of the Order of the British Empire. Another commando, and the only professional sailor on the raid, Private Anders Lassen, was the first man to board Duchessa d'Aosta. For conspicuous efficiency in getting the ship under way, Lassen was given a commission in the field, and the immediate award of the Military Cross.

March-Phillipps was killed during Operation Aquatint, a failed SSRF raid, in September 1942. Hayes also took part in Operation Aquatint but managed to evade capture and crossed the Spanish border a month later, only to be handed over to the Germans who kept him in solitary confinement for nine months before he was executed by firing squad on 13 July 1943. Appleyard later joined the Special Air Service, and on the same day that Hayes was executed Appleyard was reported missing when his plane failed to return from a mission. Lassen also joined the Special Air Service; he was awarded two bars to his MC and promoted to major. He was killed in Italy in 1945, and awarded a posthumous Victoria Cross for his actions there.

== In popular culture ==
The 2014 book, Churchill's Secret Warriors: The Explosive True Story of the Special Forces Desperadoes of WWII by Damien Lewis, chronicles the events of Operation Postmaster.

A highly fictionalized version of the events of Operation Postmaster is the subject of the 2024 Guy Ritchie film The Ministry of Ungentlemanly Warfare.
