= Bill Stirling (British Army officer) =

Special Air Service commando (1911–1983)

Lieutenant-Colonel The Much Honoured Bill Stirling of Keir
- Born: William Joseph Stirling; 9 May 1911
- Died: 1 January 1983 (aged 71)
- Spouse: Susan Bligh (m. 1940)
- Children: 4, including Archie
- Relatives: Archibald Stirling (father); David Stirling (brother)
- Military career
- Allegiance: United Kingdom
- Branch: British Army; Special Operations Executive
- Service years: 1929–1936; 1940–c. 1945
- Rank: Lieutenant-Colonel
- Units: Lovat Scouts; Scots Guards; No. 62 Commando; Special Air Service
- Commands: No. 62 Commando; 2nd Special Air Service
- Conflicts: Second World War

Lieutenant-Colonel William Joseph Stirling of Keir (9 May 1911 – 1 January 1983) was a Scottish officer of the British Army who served during the Second World War. Initially joining the Special Operations Executive, he would go on to command No. 62 Commando and then the 2nd Special Air Service (2 SAS). He was the elder brother of David Stirling, one of the founders of the SAS, but Bill has been described as the "real brains behind the operation". He was, however, removed from his command of 2 SAS by Frederick "Boy" Browning two days before D-Day because they clashed over how best to deploy his unit, thereby ending his army career.

== Early life and education ==
Stirling was born on 9 May 1911, the eldest son of Brigadier General Archibald Stirling of Keir, a Scottish laird and Margaret Fraser, daughter of Simon Fraser, 13th Lord Lovat. His parents had married in 1910 when his father was 42 and his mother was 29. His mother's family were devout Roman Catholics, and Archibald converted to this faith before their marriage. Among his siblings were David Stirling, commanding officer of the early SAS, and Peter, a diplomat. He was educated at Ampleforth College, an all-boys independent Catholic boarding school in Yorkshire, where he "shone academically and on the sports field". He went on to study history at Trinity College, Cambridge.

== Military service ==
Stirling achieved the rank of cadet serjeant in the Ampleforth College contingent of the Junior Division, Officers' Training Corps. On 1 November 1929, he was commissioned as a second lieutenant in the Lovat Scouts, Territorial Army. After graduating from university, he undertook further training at the Royal Military College, Sandhurst with the aim of becoming a full-time army officer. On 3 September 1932, he transferred to the Scots Guards, with seniority in the rank of second lieutenant from 29 January 1931. In both units he had served alongside his cousin Simon Fraser, Master of Lovat (later the 15th Lord Lovat). He was promoted to lieutenant on 29 January 1934. He transferred to the Regular Army Reserve of Officers on 25 January 1936, with seniority in the rank of lieutenant from 29 January 1934. He then resigned his commission on 25 January 1936, to dedicate himself to the family estate.

Following the outbreak of the Second World War, Stirling was an early recruit into the Special Operations Executive (SOE), joining in March 1940. In April 1940, he was part of a six-man sabotage team tasked with guerrilla warfare on mainland Europe, but the operation was aborted when their submarine hit a mine on the way to Norway. Due to his experience of the inadequacies of the training he and other SOE agents received, the following month he suggested to the War Office that Britain needed a dedicated training centre for guerrilla warfare. After this idea received support from Winston Churchill, the War Office requisitioned Inverailort House in the Scottish Highlands and the Special Training Centre opened in June 1940. Stirling was its chief instructor and among the hundreds of men who came through its doors for training were his brother David and Paddy Mayne.

In January 1941, alongside 3 troops of commandos, an SOE unit including Stirling embarked from Scotland for the Middle East Theatre. With Peter Fleming, elder brother of the creator of James Bond, he was tasked with attempting to raise a battalion of anti-fascists from Italian prisoners of war in North Africa; they did not succeed. Following this, he worked at the Cairo GHQ of Middle East Command as the personal assistant to Lieutenant General Arthur Smith. Despite the later narrative of his brother's skilful escapade to take his personal idea for the Special Air Service (SAS) into the office of General Neil Ritchie, the concept was a joint idea between the brothers who were both in Cairo by then and it was Bill who presented the idea to the HQ. L Detachment, Special Air Squadron was raised in August 1941. The first raid for the SAS was scheduled for 16 November 1941. However, Bill was called back to the UK on 3 November, leaving his brother and their recruits to undertake their first, disastrous raid; of the 55 men who participated, only 21 returned alive to the rendezvous point and without firing a shot. Bill disembarked in Britain in January 1942, and, having given an account of his time in North Africa to the SOE and the War officer, was given four months leave. He spent this time on his family estate with his young family, while also raising money for the war effort through raffles and bake sales.

In February 1942, the Small Scale Raiding Force was formed under the command of Gus March-Phillipps. Following March-Phillipps' death on 12 September 1942 during the disastrous Operation Aquatint, leadership of the unit briefly fell to its second in command, Captain Geoffrey Appleyard. On 17 October 1942, Stirling was appointed its commanding officer and promoted to lieutenant colonel. His role was "not to lead in the field but to direct from the sidelines"; one he would also fulfill in his later command. By the end of the year, he was preparing the unit, now known as No. 62 Commando, for deployment to North Africa. His brother was captured on 24 January 1943 in Tunisia and would spend the rest of the war as a POW; Paddy Mayne then took command of the SAS. Stirling and the 62 Commando set sail from Glasgow to Algiers in February 1943. Bill learnt of his brother's capture on arrival and then played a role in the re-organisation of the SAS.

In March 1943, Mayne's unit, the original SAS, was redesignated the Special Raiding Squadron (retaining that name for the rest of the year), with one of its squadrons becoming the Special Boat Squadron (SBS). In May 1943, Stirling raised the 2nd Special Air Service (2 SAS) from 62 Commando and almost 400 recruits from among the British forces in North Africa. 2 SAS's first raid, "Operation Snapdragon", occurred at the end of the month, and involved reconnaissance of the Italian island Pantelleria. 1 SAS and 2 SAS operated separately, with the former focused on its new role as an amphibious raiding force, while Stirling's 2 SAS focused on the regiment's original modus operandi of small teams parachuting into enemy territory. Initially based in Tunisia, he led the 2 SAS during its operations in Sicily and during the Italian Campaign. Stirling himself never went on an SAS raid.

In early 1944, 1 SAS and 2 SAS were recalled to the United Kingdom, from whence they launched raids on Nazi-occupied Europe in the run up to the Allied invasion of Normandy. Stirling argued with senior army officers including Frederick "Boy" Browning about how best to use the SAS during the up coming Allied invasion of Europe; Stirling wanted his troops dropped far behind the front to continue their disrupting tactics, while Browning wanted the SAS to join other airborne troops landing just behind the front line and to act as standard parachute infantry. On 4 June 1944, two days before D-Day, Stirling was removed as commanding officer of 2 SAS and replaced by Lieutenant Colonel Brian Franks; he had won the argument as to how best to use the SAS but had been sacked in the process.

As a member of the Regular Army Reserve of Officers, he was promoted from lieutenant (war substantive major) to be major on 1 January 1949. Having reached the age limit, he relinquished his commission on 1 July 1961, and was granted the honorary rank of lieutenant colonel.

== Later life ==
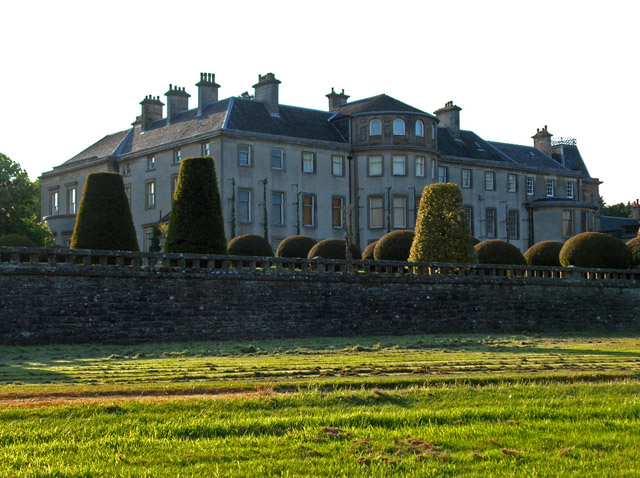
Keir House

Stirling had succeeded his father as laird of Keir upon his death in 1931. He could have lived a life of luxury, but as it states in his obituary in The Times; "Born to huge possessions he could have sat still and enjoyed good fortune but there was in his character a streak of the Scottish adventurer scorning ease and plenty".

On 27 July 1945, Stirling was appointed a Forestry Commissioner by King George VI. In addition to his estate in Scotland, he also farmed in Tanzania. He lost his 4,000 acre estate in Tanzania to the policy of Africanisation of President Julius Nyerere in 1974. The following year, in 1975, he sold Keir House and 15,000 acres (6,100 ha) of land to a Arab syndicate led by Mahdi Al Tajir, the then United Arab Emirates Ambassador to the United Kingdom for £2 million (equivalent to £15.53 million in 2025). The house had been in the Stirling family for 570 years but, controversially, he "had not consulted his family before the sale was agreed".

In late December 1982, Stirling fell and broke a leg at his home in Park Lane, London; he lay undiscovered for at least 36 hours. He subsequently died on 1 January 1983, aged 71, at King Edward VII's Hospital for Officers. On 8 March 1983, a requiem mass was held for him at the Guards' Chapel, Wellington Barracks in London; this was attended by representatives of the royal family, nobility and veterans who had served with him.

== Personal life ==
Stirling was married to Susan Rachel Bligh (1916–1983), daughter of Noel Bligh, son of the 8th Earl of Darnley; she was a model before they married. They had four children together. His eldest son, Archibald, was married to Diana Rigg.

== In popular culture ==
Bill Stirling is depicted by Gwilym Lee in Season 2 (2025) of the television historical drama SAS: Rogue Heroes.
