= Casquets lighthouses =

Lighthouse in the Channel Islands

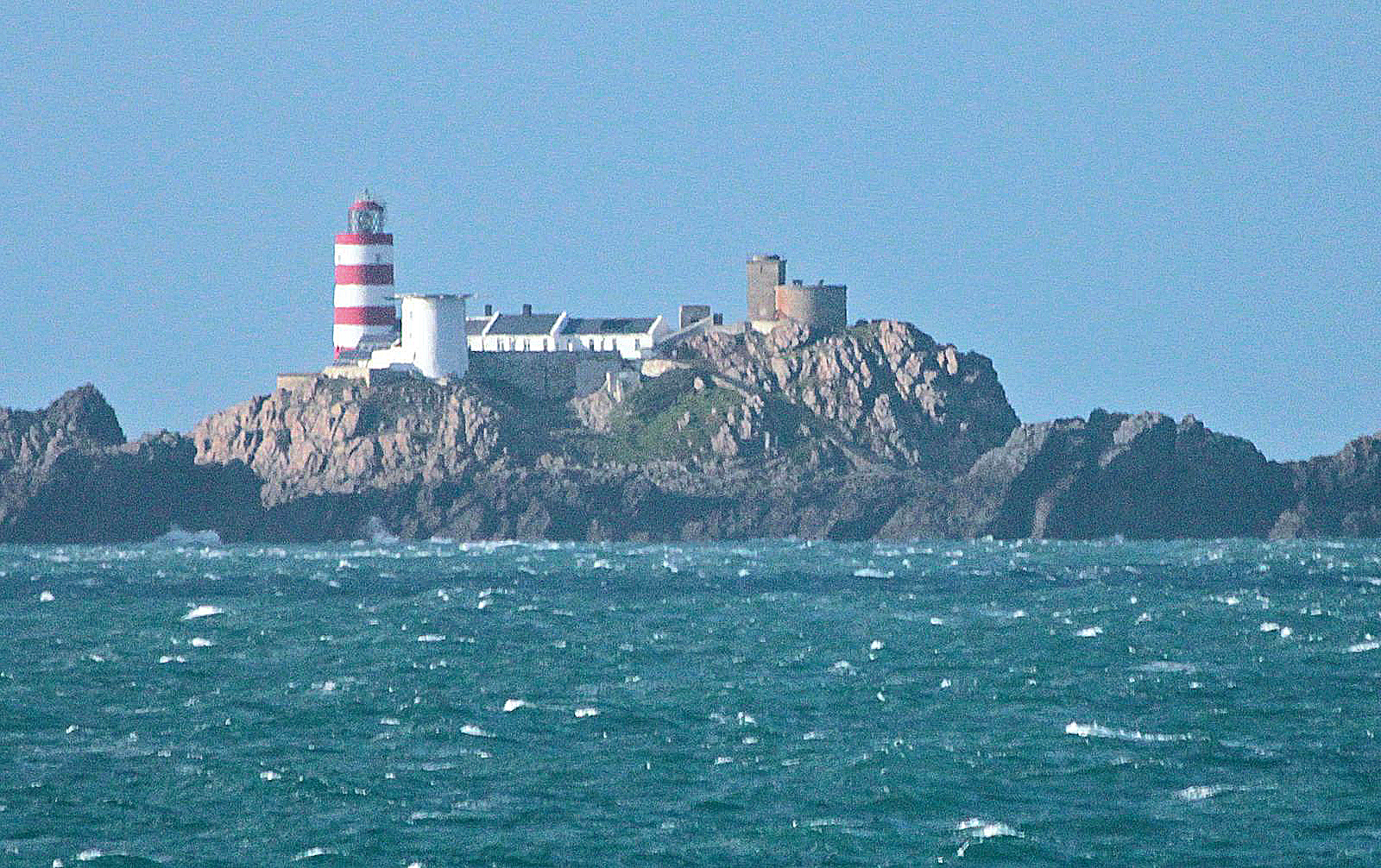
- Les Casquets seen from the ferry Condor Liberation
- Location: Les Casquets; Alderney; Channel Islands
- Coordinates: 49°43′19″N 2°22′37″W

Tower
- Constructed: 1723
- Construction: stone tower
- Automated: 1990
- Height: 23 m (75 ft)
- Shape: cylindrical tower with balcony and lantern
- Markings: white and red horizontal bands, red lantern
- Power source: solar power, wind turbine
- Operator: Trinity House

Light
- First lit: 1724
- Focal height: 37 m (121 ft)
- Lens: 2nd Order (700mm) five panel rotating
- Light source: LED
- Intensity: 452,000 candela
- Range: 18 nmi (33 km; 21 mi)
- Characteristic: Fl (5) W 30 s.

Casquets Lighthouse is an active lighthouse located on the rocky Les Casquets, Alderney, Channel Islands.

== History ==
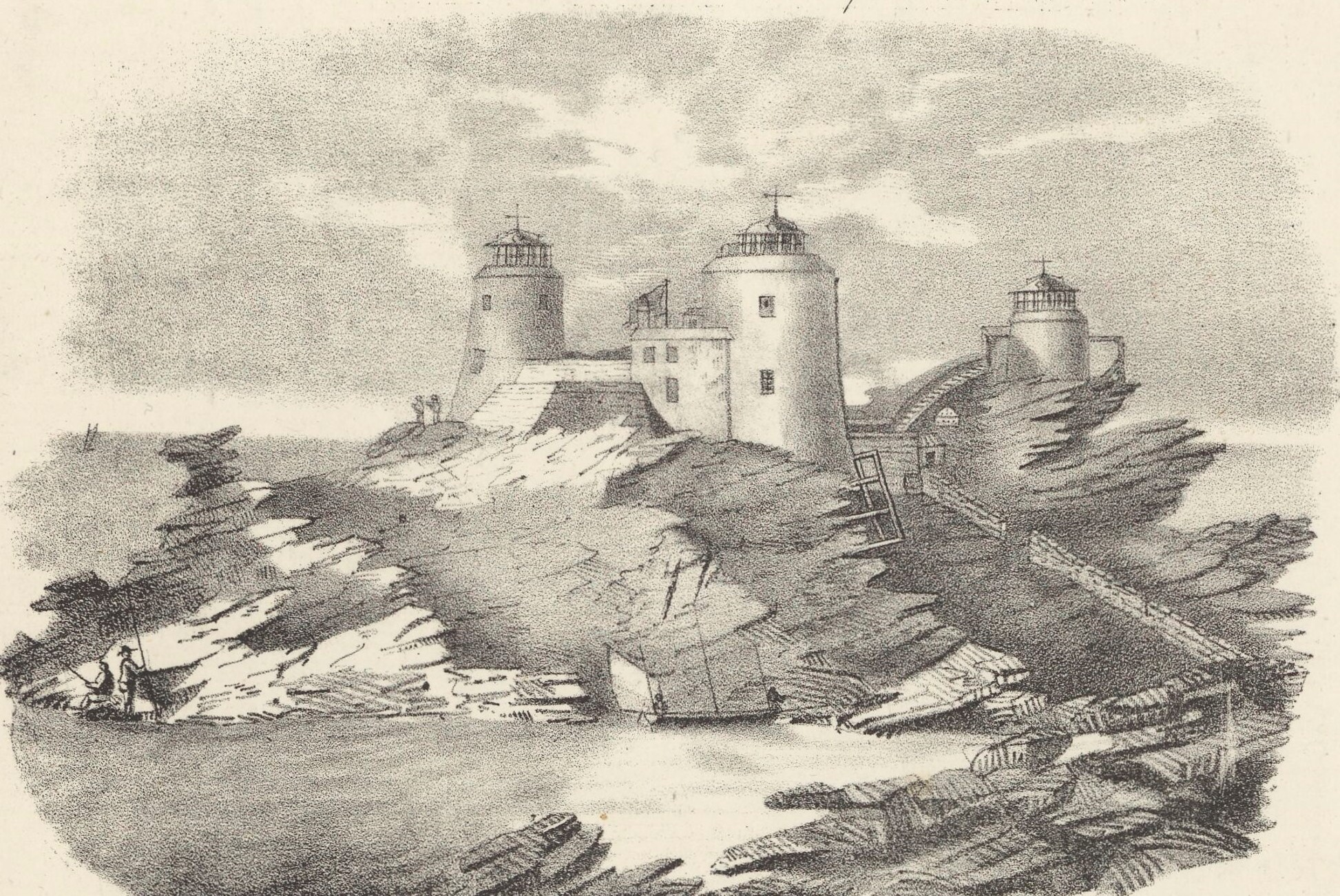
The lighthouses on Les Casquets (left-right: St Peter's, St Thomas & Dungeon), pictured in 1833.

=== 18th century ===
Originally the lighthouse was one of three lighthouses which were established together on Les Casquets in the early 1720s. All three were lit by coal fires. The decision was taken to build three towers so as to give the lights a distinctive appearance which would not be confused with lighthouses in nearby France, and also to distinguish them from the double lighthouse which had recently been established on Portland Bill to the north (which marked the opposite side of the English Channel). The individual lighthouses were named St Peter's (the north-west tower), St Thomas (the south-west tower) and Dungeon (the easternmost tower). The towers were built of stone quarried from the island itself; the west towers were taller than the east tower, but all three lights were at the same elevation from sea level. They started operation on 30 October 1724. Stone walls were built, linking the three towers, to create a triangular compound for the keepers who lived on site.

The lighthouses were built by Thomas Le Cocq, owner of the rocks, under licence from Trinity House. Le Cocq was granted a 61-year lease: he was to be paid a halfpenny per ton of ship when vessels passed the rocks (foreign vessels were to pay double) and in turn he paid Trinity House 50 pounds per year for the right to run the lighthouses.

Each coal brazier, atop its tower, was placed within a glass lantern to protect against the wind; but these were prone to getting obscured by soot. Moreover, when the lighthouses were inspected (following the loss of HMS Victory, which had gone down with over a thousand souls in 1744) it was found that several broken panes of glass had been replaced with wood, and that larger braziers, which Trinity House had provided to improve the lights, had not been installed (Le Cocq wishing to avoid increased expenditure on coal).

Thomas Le Cocq died in 1760; his grandchildren inherited the lease. They left Les Casquets in the hands of a local agent, who recruited the keepers and managed their supplies of food and of coal for the lights. He went on to oversee the rebuilding of the towers, which were fitted with new copper and glass lanterns containing oil lamps in place of the coal fires; these came into operation on 30 October 1779 (allowing the number of keepers on station to be reduced from seven to four).

In 1785 the lease which had been granted to Le Cocq expired and the lighthouses reverted to Trinity House. Five years later they were again upgraded, each tower being fitted with new-style parabolic reflectors and 'a number of Argand-lamps, fixed on a ring, moving in a circular revolution, and presenting alternately a bright body of light in every direction'. A single clockwork mechanism caused the lamps to revolve, which was connected to the three towers by way of a system of ropes and sheaves. The new lamps and reflectors were first used on 25 November 1790.

=== 19th century ===
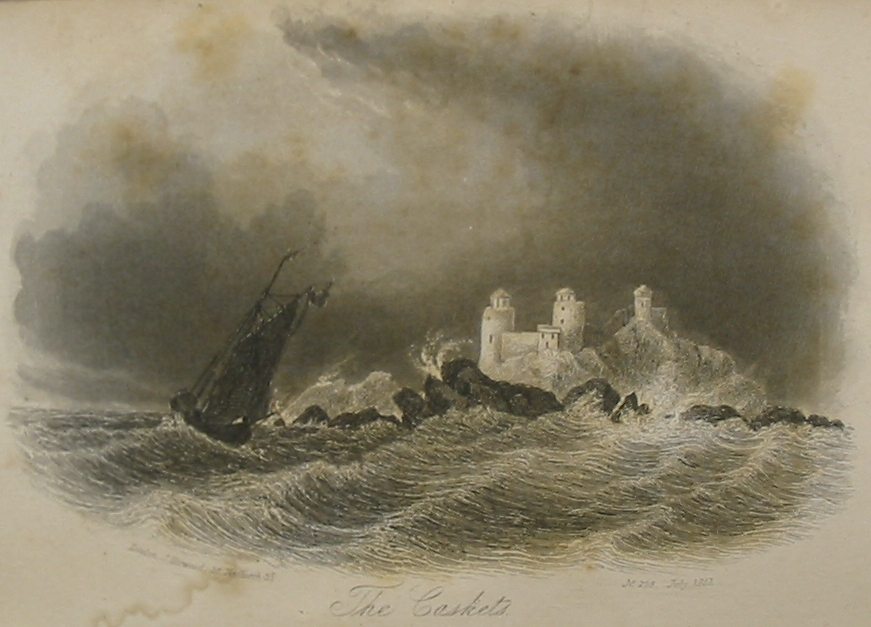
Les Casquets in 1852 (before the towers were extended in height)

In the early nineteenth century the lights were looked after by a family living on the island. Local historian John Jacob describes the lighthouses in 1815 as being kept by 'a man, his wife and a grown up daughter, whose duty was pretty severe, in watching and trimming the lamps at night, particularly in winter, when the spray of the sea flies over, perhaps double the height of the towers'. As well as living quarters for the family, the compound contained a house for the agent to use on his visits to the island, a carpenter's shop for repairs, a small vegetable garden (with soil provided from Alderney) and a considerable amount of storage room (mostly within the two western towers), where stocks of provisions 'brought here in fair season' could be kept for winter sustenance. A shutter telegraph enabled communication with Alderney. Victuals such as salt beef, flour, malt and biscuit were provided by Trinity House; there were two (later three) landing areas for boats on the island, and a system of different coloured flags was used to signal to approaching vessels which (if any) was safe to use at that particular time. As well as growing vegetables, the family kept poultry on the island and caught a great many fish, which were either consumed promptly or else cured and kept for later.

At this time each lantern contained eight lamps and reflectors. The western towers were 38 ft in height, the Dungeon tower 13 ft, which placed the three lights at 80 feet (24 m) above sea level. When Robert Stevenson visited the towers in 1818 he criticised the state of the lamps and their general arrangement. In particular, since the revolving lamps were not synchronised, the triple characteristic of the light was no longer easily discernible; and because they had been mounted low each light was prone to being obscured by the diameter of its tower. A new revolving apparatus was provided in 1818, which needed winding every hour and a half (there was now one mechanism for the Dungeon tower and a shared mechanism for the other two towers). The lighthouses were badly damaged and the lanterns smashed in a severe storm on 31 October 1823.

From 1818 to 1849 the lighthouse was managed by keeper Louis Hougre and his family, who lived together on the island. Some Elder Brethren, visiting in 1833, reported that he, his wife and their eight children were all living on the island and managing the lights between them; the usual routine was that Louis and his son would light the lamps and then go immediately to bed, whereupon his wife and their two eldest daughters would keep watch until midnight, after which Louis and his son would take over for the remainder of the night.

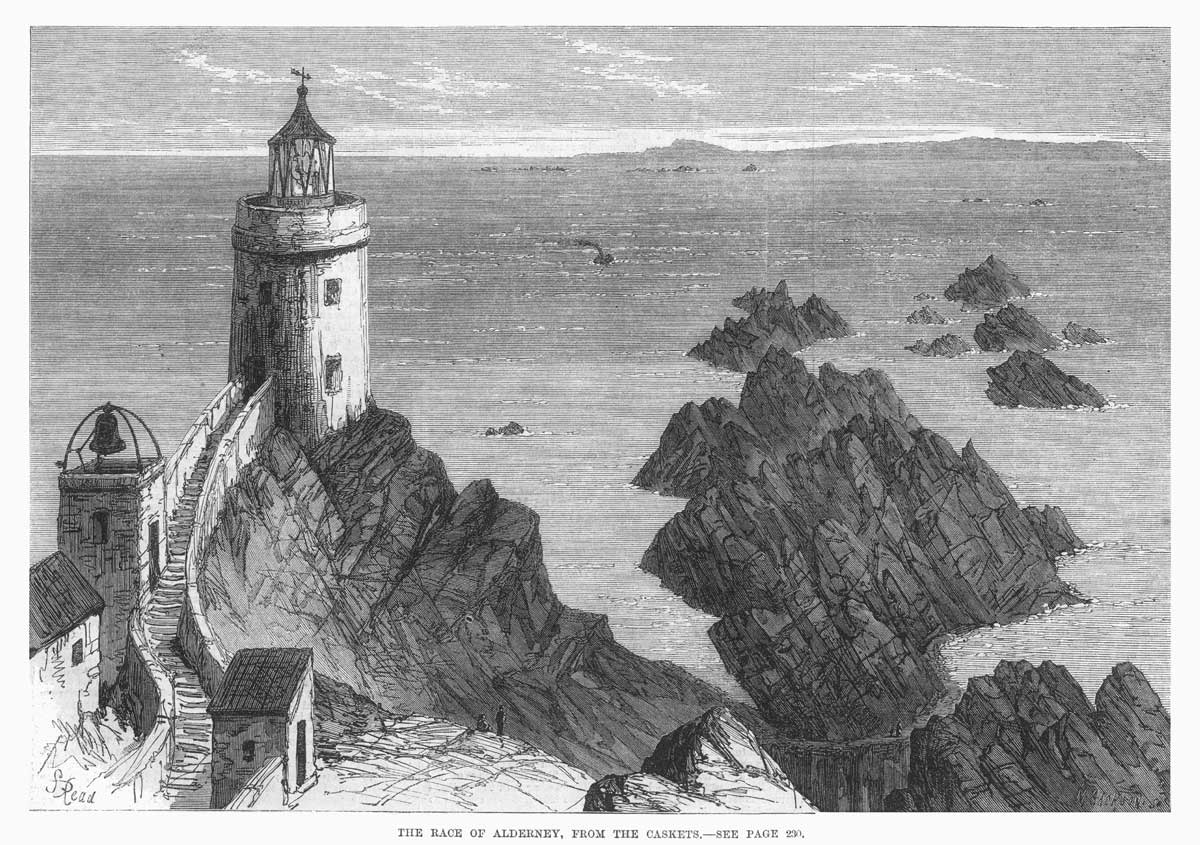
Les Casquets (the Dungeon light and bell tower) looking east (towards Alderney)

In 1832 the lights were listed as having a range of 13 nautical miles (24 km; 15 mi) and displaying one flash every 15 seconds. In 1847 a 12 cwt fog bell was added, which sounded once every five minutes in foggy weather; it was placed on a small square tower near the Dungeon light, and was driven by clockwork.

In 1849 Louis Hougre retired on full pay; he and his family went to live on Alderney. In their place a team of three keepers were appointed (later increased to four), of whom one would be on leave (for a month at a time, in turns) while the others were on station.

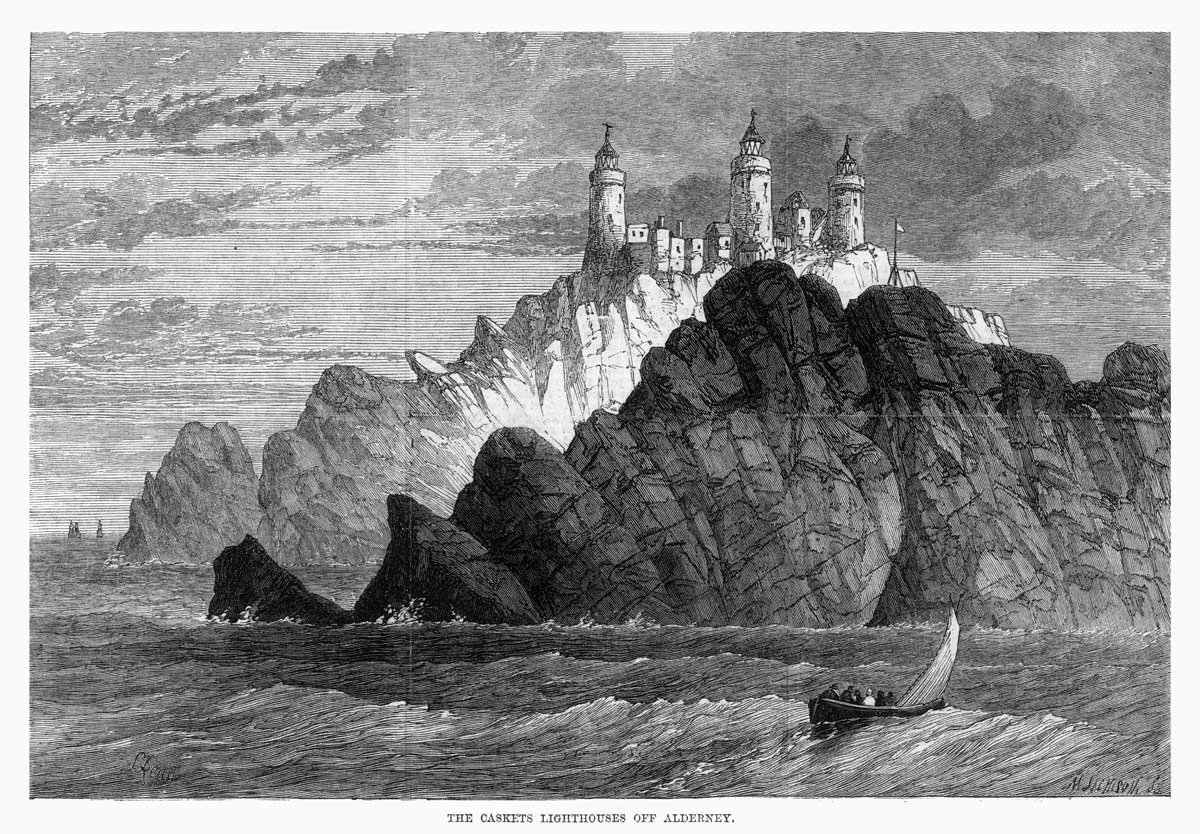
Les Casquets with lighthouses in 1868

In 1854 the lighthouse towers were improved in a series of works overseen by James Walker. Each tower was raised by a further 30 feet (10 m) and topped by a new lantern. Each lantern was equipped with a three-sided array of twelve 184-kilocandela lamps and reflectors, which revolved once a minute to give one slow flash every twenty seconds. The lamps were now 113 feet (34 m) above sea level and visible for 15 nautical miles (28 km; 17 mi) out to sea. In 1858 two new clockwork drives were provided, meaning that each tower now had its own mechanism for revolving the lamps.

In 1877 the North West Tower was raised again and fitted with a new more powerful lamp and a first-order dioptric optic (manufactured by Chance Brothers). A three-sided optic with three panels on each side, it was one of the first ever group-flashing lenses (newly-designed by John Hopkinson), the character of which was distinctive enough for the lights in the other two towers to be discontinued. (Their lanterns, however, were subsequently re-used: one on the lighthouse at Bideford, the other for a new low light at South Stack.) The new light displayed three two-second flashes every half minute; it had a range of 17 nautical miles (31 km; 20 mi), at a height of 120 feet (37 m) above sea level.

The other two towers were reduced in height. A siren fog signal was installed in the Dungeon tower in 1877, powered by a caloric engine; it was sounded through a horizontal horn mounted on the roof, which could be turned to face the prevailing wind, and gave three blasts every five minutes (changed in 1891 to three blasts every two minutes). The decommissioned St Thomas tower was initially used as a storehouse.

=== 20th century ===
The light continued to be improved: a Matthews three-mantle petroleum vapour burner replaced the old multi-wick oil lamp in the early 1900s. By 1902 a new, more powerful fog signal had been installed: a disc siren which sounded through a 22-foot (6.7 m) vertical trumpet with an omnidirectional resonator. In 1922 the siren was replaced by a diaphone; compressed air was produced by a pair of Blackstone semi-diesel engines (which would remain in service until 1970).

A radio beacon was established on Les Casquets in 1928, the equipment for which was housed in the old St Thomas tower.

Following the German occupation of the Channel Islands in 1940 the Casquets were fortified and garrisoned, and used by the occupying forces to aid the movement of their ships and to monitor Allied communications in the English Channel. British commandos of the Small Scale Raiding Force made two raids during the Second World War on the lighthouse. The first raid, Operation Dryad, took place on 2–3 September 1942: the radio equipment was destroyed, code books were removed and the seven German keepers were taken back to England as prisoners of war. Associated allied aircraft fire damaged the lantern and optic at this time, putting the light out of action.

Conversion to electric light took place in 1952, with the installation of a 2,830 kilocandela lamp. At the same time a new optic was installed: a second-order five-panel dioptric which displayed five flashes every thirty seconds and had a range of 17 nautical miles (31 km; 20 mi). The optic was unusual in that it rotated anti-clockwise. The fog signal was also upgraded: three diaphones and resonators were installed in a new turret adjacent to the engine room (in the old Dungeon tower); they sounded three blasts every two minutes (changed in 1970 to two blasts every minute). Trinity House extended its helicopter operations to the Casquets in 1972 (it had previously only been accessible by boat); later a helicopter pad was installed on top of the St Thomas tower.

Automation followed in 1990. The diaphone was decommissioned and an electric fog signal was installed on the parapet of the main tower; this, like its predecessor, produced two blasts every 60 seconds, with a nominal range of 3 nautical miles (5.6 km; 3.5 mi). Equipped with a new lamp the lighthouse had a visible range of 24 nautical miles (44 km; 28 mi) and operated 24 hours a day.

=== 21st century ===
In 2010 a two-year programme of modernisation was begun at the lighthouse, with a view to its becoming entirely powered by renewable energy sources. As part of this process the range of the light was reduced from 24 to 18 nautical miles, and the fog signal was permanently discontinued from 11 May 2011.

Trinity House celebrated the tercentenary of the lighthouse on 13 July 2024. The Deputy Master of Trinity House visited the island with the Lieutenant Governor of Guernsey and unveiled a plaque in the lighthouse 'to commemorate the 300th Anniversary of the commissioning of the lighthouse at Les Casquets, Alderney on 30th October 1724'.

== Present day ==
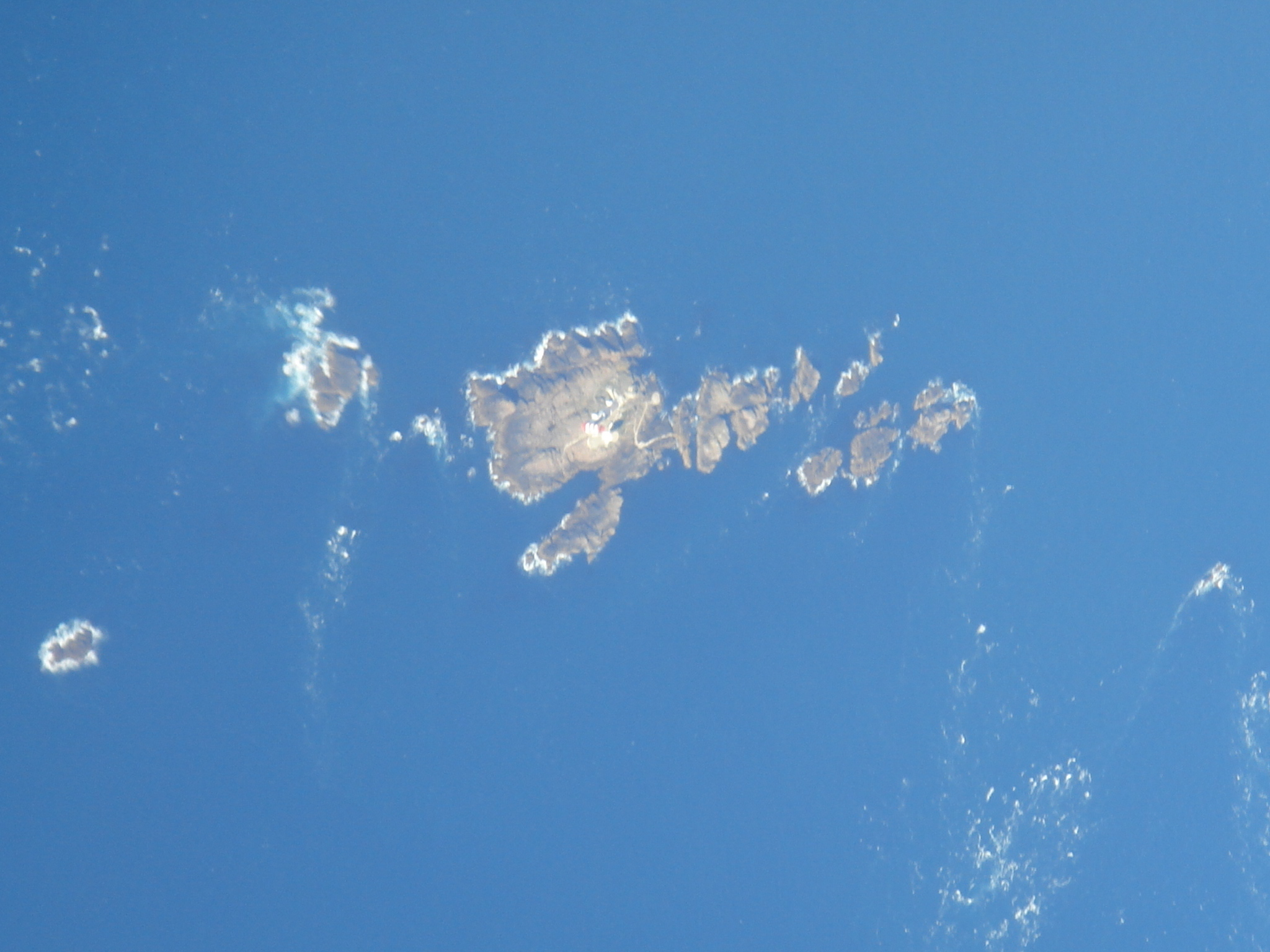
The Casquets from the air, showing the lighthouse on the centre island

The current light in the 23 metres (75 ft) North West Tower is 37 metres (121 ft) above mean sea level and flashes five times every 30 seconds and with flashes 3.7 seconds apart. It can be seen for around 18 nautical miles (33 km; 21 mi) in clear weather. The light is now powered by a combination of solar and wind energy. The revolving optic is still in use, but the light source is LED (in addition to which a separate LED flasher, mounted on the roof of the lantern, functions as a standby lamp).

The South West Tower is topped with a helipad and there is another helipad on a flat section of the rock. The rocks are also marked using racon with a Morse letter T on radar displays. The lighthouse is monitored and controlled from the Trinity House Operations Control Centre in Harwich.

== See also ==
- Les Casquets
- List of lighthouses in the Channel Islands
