= Operation Branford =

WW2 British Commando raid

Coordinates: 49.73°N 2.251667°W

Operation Branford was a British Commando raid during the Second World War. The target of the raid was the island of Burhou in the Channel Islands. The raiding force was supplied by No. 62 Commando also known as the Small Scale Raiding Force was commanded by Captain Ogden-Smith and consisted of 11 men. The raid took place a few days after the successful Operation Dryad over the night of 7/8 September 1942. Their objective was to establish whether the island was suitable as an artillery battery position to support an attack on Alderney.
