= Geoffrey Appleyard =

British Army officer

John Geoffrey Appleyard
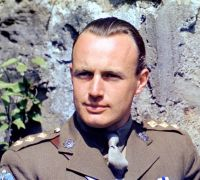
- Captain Geoffrey Appleyard
- Born: 20 December 1916; Bramley, Leeds, West Yorkshire, England
- Died: 13 July 1943 (aged 26); Near Sicily, Italy
- Burial place: Cassino Memorial
- Military career
- Allegiance: United Kingdom
- Branch: British Army
- Service years: 1939–1943
- Rank: Major
- Nickname: "Apple"
- Service number: 86639
- Units: No. 7 Commando; No. 62 Commando; 2nd Special Air Service
- Commands: Small Scale Raiding Force
- Conflicts: Second World War: Battle of France; Dunkirk evacuation; Operation Savannah; Operation Postmaster; Operation Dryad; Operation Basalt; Operation Chestnut †
- Awards: Companion of the Distinguished Service Order; Military Cross & Bar

John Geoffrey Appleyard, DSO, MC & Bar (20 December 1916 – 13 July 1943) was a British Army officer, who served in the Commandos and Special Air Service during the Second World War.

== Early life and education ==
Appleyard was born in Bramley, Leeds, West Yorkshire, the son of John Ernest Appleyard, a successful motor engineer, and Mary Elizabeth Northrop. His brother Ian became a successful rally driver. Geoffrey grew up in Linton, West Yorkshire, and was educated at Bootham School in York, where he combined academic success with natural history and roof-climbing. At Caius College, Cambridge, he obtained a first in Engineering and a skiing blue, while he was also his college's Captain of Boats, and competed as a highly successful international skier.

== Military service ==
Appleyard was commissioned into the Royal Army Service Corps (Supplementary Reserve) on 1 April 1939 with the rank of second lieutenant. Mobilised for active service on 24 August 1939, he commanded an RASC mobile motor repair workshop as part of the British Expeditionary Force in northern France. During the Battle of France he was ordered to destroy all his vehicles, and then was evacuated from Dunkirk.

Appleyard volunteered to join the Commandos in late 1940, and was posted to B Troop, No. 7 Commando. He was promoted to the war substantive rank of lieutenant on 1 January 1941 and, in May, now an acting captain, was awarded the Military Cross for his "gallant and distinguished services in the field", after taking part in an operation by boat and submarine to pick up two Operation Savanna agents on the coast of France and bring them back to England.

Appleyard then served aboard the 62-foot (19 m) ketch-rigged Brixham trawler Maid Honour, which sailed to the coast of West Africa, spending six months reporting on enemy submarine activity and carrying out clandestine raids. The highlight of the assignment was Operation Postmaster, in which the Italian liner Duchessa d'Aosta and the German tug Likomba were boarded and towed from the neutral Spanish island of Fernando Po and taken to Nigeria. On his return he was awarded a Bar to his Military Cross.

After the success of "Postmaster", the "Maid Honour Force" was expanded (though it never numbered more than 55 men at any time) and renamed the "Small Scale Raiding Force", though its official designation was No. 62 Commando, under the operational control of Combined Operations Headquarters. Appleyard took part in many SSRF raids on the coast of occupied France, landing in small boats from motor launches, compelling the Germans to reinforce their defences along hundreds of miles of coastline, and diverting significant numbers of troops from combat duties elsewhere. However, an injury prevented him from going ashore in the disastrous Operation Aquatint, on 12 September 1942, when an attack at Sainte-Honorine-des-Pertes, Normandy, went badly wrong and half the 10-man force were captured, and the other half killed, including the SSRF's commanding officer Major Gustavus March-Phillipps. Its failure stemmed in part from Appleyard mistaking the landing beach, though he never knew that.

Appleyard took command of the SSRF, and led 10 men of the SSRF and No. 12 Commando, on Operation Basalt, landing on the Channel island of Sark on the night of 3/4 October 1942. Five Germans were taken prisoner, but when one shouted a warning he was shot dead. With the enemy now alerted, the raiders returned to the beach with the remaining four prisoners. En route, three of them attempted to escape and were killed. As a result, an enraged Hitler issued the infamous Kommandobefehl ("Commando Order"), stating that all captured Commandos were to be shot without exception.

Further operations followed, and on 15 December 1942 Appleyard was appointed a Companion of the Distinguished Service Order. On meeting the now Temporary Major Appleyard at his third investiture in eleven months, King George VI was both amused and impressed, greeting him with: "What, you again?"

== Death ==
The SSRF was disbanded in April 1943, but many of its members were transferred to Algeria, where they formed the nucleus of Bill Stirling's new 2nd Special Air Service, of which Appleyard was appointed second-in-command. On the night of 12/13 July 1943, during the Allied invasion of Sicily, Appleyard supervised the dropping of a group of SAS paratroopers north of Randazzo in Operation Chestnut. The Albemarle aircraft disappeared on the return flight over the Mediterranean, and Appleyard was declared missing presumed dead. It had probably been shot down by friendly fire. He is commemorated at the Cassino Memorial.

Describing him, Vladimir "Popski" Peniakoff said, "He was one of the few officers who had developed the technique of the small scale raid: the care he took of his men made him stand out among brother officers who were too excited by the prospect of adventure to think of anybody, but their own selves."

== Cultural depictions ==
In the 2024 movie The Ministry of Ungentlemanly Warfare, Geoffrey is portrayed by British actor Alex Pettyfer. The movie portrays a heavily fictionalized version of Operation Postmaster.

== See also ==
- List of people who disappeared mysteriously at sea
