= Operation Basalt =

British raid on channel islands in WW2

Coordinates: 49.430°N 2.365°W

- Part of World War II
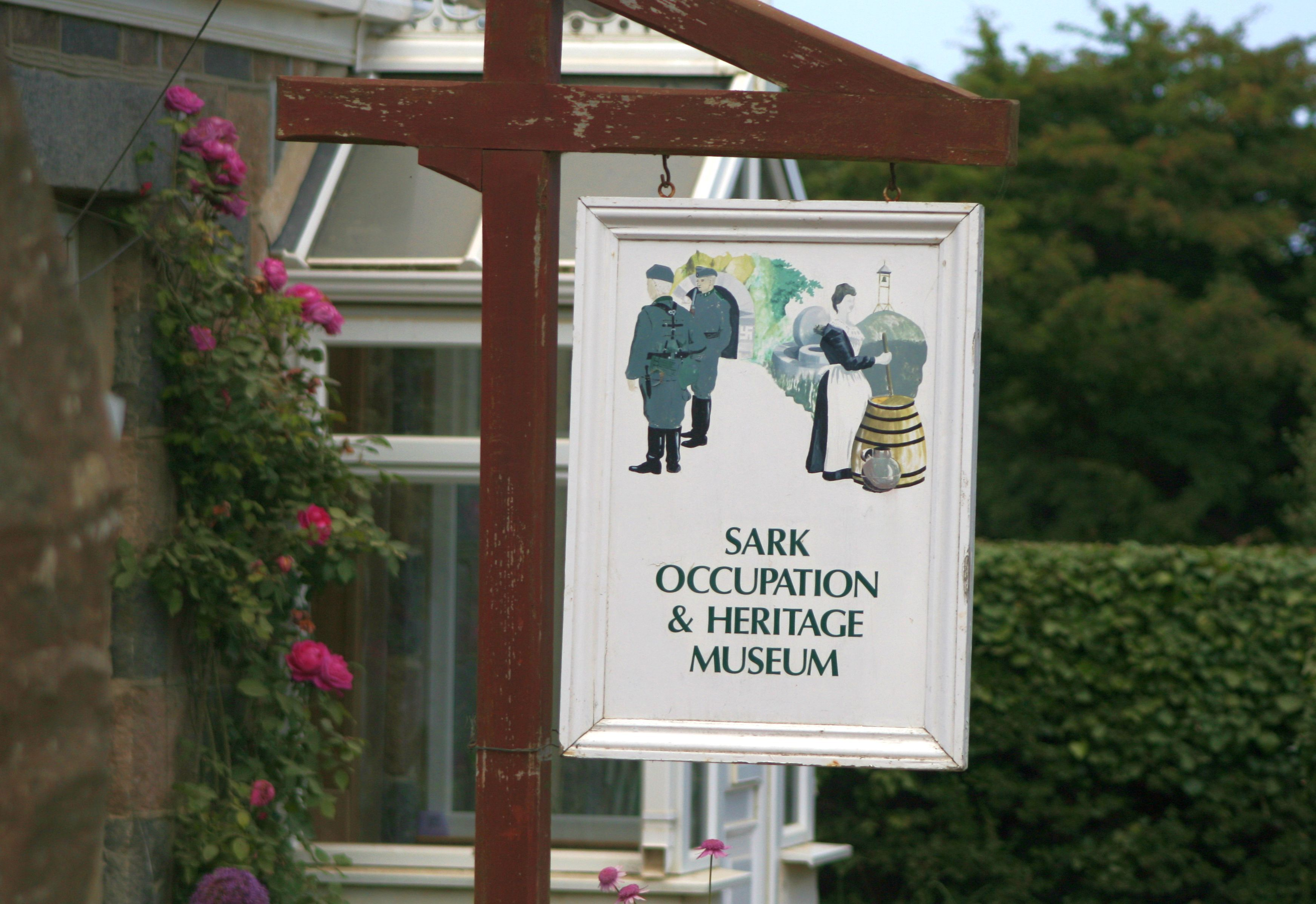
- Sark Occupation and Heritage Museum
Date	3–4 October 1942
Location	Sark
Result	British victory

Belligerents
United Kingdom	(Nazi Germany) Germany

Strength
12	20

Casualties and losses
None	Three killed, one captured

Operation Basalt was a small British raid conducted during World War II on Sark during the German occupation of the Channel Islands.

The objective of the raid was offensive reconnaissance and capturing prisoners.

== First attempt ==
The original plan was for the raid to take place on the night of 18–19 September 1942, and was postponed by a day, due to bad weather. Leaving Portland at 2200 it took longer than planned to reach Sark and MTB 344 encountered strong currents on the approach, resulting in an arrival time of 0300. The requirement to depart by 0330 in order to be clear of the German occupied islands before dawn resulted in the operation being aborted. MTB 344 returned safely to Portland at 0530.

== Second attempt ==
On the night of 3–4 October 1942 12 men from the Special Operations Executive commanded No. 62 Commando (also known as the "Small Scale Raiding Force") and No. 12 Commando, left Portland on MTB 344 at 1900 and landed on Sark with the object of offensive reconnaissance and capturing prisoners.

Climbing the cliff at the Hog's Back, between Dixcart Bay and Derrible Bay, the commandos were not spotted by German sentries and did not encounter any guards. Several of the raiders broke into the house of a Mrs Frances Noel Pittard, who proved informative and advised that there were about 20 Germans in the annex to the nearby Dixcart Hotel. She declined an offer to take her to England and provided the commandos with documents including local newspapers from Guernsey.

In front of the hotel was a long hut-type building. There was one guard, who was silently killed by Danish commando Anders Lassen, using his commando knife. This annex comprised a corridor and six rooms with five sleeping Germans, none officers. The men were roused and taken outside whereafter the commandos decided to go to the hotel and capture more of the enemy. To minimise the guard left with the captives, the commandos tied the prisoners' hands with the two metre (six-foot) toggle ropes each carried and required them to hold up their trousers. The practice of removing belts and/or braces and tearing open the fly was a common technique used by the commandos to make it as difficult as possible for captives to run away. Most of the prisoners when captured were dressed for sleeping; one was naked and was not allowed to dress.

While this was being undertaken, the naked man escaped and ran off shouting, and then a general struggle started with the other prisoners. The prisoners were shouting and, fearing the arrival of enemy troops, the raiders returned to the beach with the remaining prisoners. Three prisoners made a break. One was instantly shot dead with a .38 revolver, while another prisoner, wounded, managed to escape. Whether or not some had freed their hands was never established, nor if all three broke at the same time. Two were believed shot and one stabbed by Ogden-Brown. The sole remaining prisoner, Obergefreiter Hermann Weinreich, was conveyed safely to England and provided useful information.

Although the Germans on the island were alerted, the commandos managed to climb down the cliff, return to MTB 344 in their small boat, and escape with no injuries.

Three German soldiers had died: the sentry and two prisoners.

=== Consequences ===
A few days later, the Germans issued a communiqué implying at least one prisoner had escaped and two were shot while resisting having their hands tied. This came shortly after the Dieppe Raid where an Allied document reportedly gave instructions for prisoners' hands to be tied. When this was brought to Adolf Hitler's attention, he ordered the shackling of Canadian prisoners, which led to a reciprocating order by British and Canadian authorities for German prisoners being held in Canada.

It is also believed that this raid contributed to Hitler's decision to issue his Commando Order on 18 October 1942 instructing all captured commandos or commando-type personnel be executed as a matter of procedure. This order resulted in war crimes being committed.

The newspapers recovered from Sark gave details of the deportation of civilians to Germany, this being the first evidence the British had seen of potential German war crimes in the occupied Channel Islands. The Germans justified the action as being identical to the Allied removal of German civilians from Persia to Australia that had taken place in 1941. No prosecution took place.

The raid resulted in increased security measures being taken on Sark, mainly through an increase in the number of mines, to 13,000, being laid and the deportation to Germany of 201 Channel Island civilians with 48 Sark civilians, including Mrs Pittard, who had just completed a three-month jail term, and Robert Hathaway, the husband of the Dame of Sark, in February 1943. Dame Sybil Hathaway remarked on the raid as it "seemed a heavy price to pay for the capture of one prisoner and a copy of the Guernsey Evening Press".

=== Participants on second attempt ===
Names of the soldiers who are known to have participated in the raid:

- Major Geoffrey Appleyard (Note: Page 197 of Eric Lee's book does not have a complete list of the men involved. Lee states in Appendix 3 that "After more than seven decades I have reached the conclusion that we might never know with absolute certainty who were the twelve men in the SSRF and No. 12 Commando who landed on Sark that night.")
- Captain Philip Pinckney (later of 2nd SAS – see also Operation Speedwell)
- Lieut. Anders Lassen (later Major, VC, MC — see also Operation Roast)
- Patrick Dudgeon
- Colin Ogden Smith
- Bruce Ogden Smith
- Graham Young
- James Edgar
- Sergeant Horace 'Brummie' Stokes (later of 2nd SAS – see also Operation Speedwell)
- Corporal Flint
- Bombardier Eric Forster
- Sergeant Joseph "Tim" Robinson (later of 2nd SAS – see also Operation Speedwell)

A Private Redborn claimed to have been on the raid; however, no official records of anyone under this name exist. (Note: Alone of all the possible participants in this raid, Redborn's name appears in no official records. The first reference to him appears in Suzanne Lassen's book about her son Anders, published just after the war. Redborn may therefore be a cover name for a commando who was seeking to protect his identify, as all the men had signed the Official Secrets Act.)

== Subsequent raids ==
The actor David Niven, who participated in the Channel raids, stated in his autobiography The Moon's a Balloon that the commandos who landed on Sark were taken to the local pub by the locals for a drink. However, Niven also erroneously stated that there were no German troops on Sark at the time. Niven's account is almost certainly a reference to Operation Ambassador in July 1940, when 140 men from No. 3 Commando and No. 11 Independent Company landed on Little Sark by mistake, thinking they had landed on Guernsey as part of a larger force. They found no Germans and eventually returned to their boat, but there are no reports of them meeting with locals or drinking with them.

More than a year later, in December 1943, there was a follow-up raid on Sark by a team of British and French commandos, known as Operation Hardtack 7. It was a complete failure, as two of the four men were killed by German mines as they attempted to cross the Hog's Back, following the same route as the commandos had done in 1942 — a known route which was now heavily mined.

== Memorial ==
On the 80th anniversary of the raid, in 2022, a memorial was unveiled to the raid, on the cliff top in Sark.

== See also ==
- Commando Order
- No. 62 Commando
- German occupation of the Channel Islands
- Sark during the German occupation of the Channel Islands
