= Anders Lassen =

Danish military officer (1920–1945)

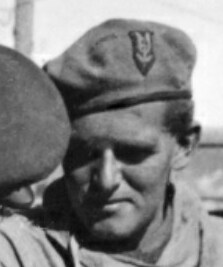
- Born: 22 September 1920; Høvdingsgård, Denmark
- Died: 9 April 1945 (aged 24); Comacchio, Italy
- Burial place: Argenta Gap War Cemetery
- Relatives: Frederik Raben-Levetzau (maternal grandfather); Axel Freiherr von dem Bussche-Streithorst (cousin)
- Military career
- Allegiance: United Kingdom (Note: Lassen never obtained British nationality and served as a Danish citizen)
- Branch: British Army
- Service years: 1940–1945
- Rank: Major
- Service number: 234907
- Commands: No. 62 Commando; Special Boat Service, Special Air Service
- Conflicts: Second World War; Operation Postmaster; Operation Albumen; Operation Dryad; Raid on Santorini; Italian campaign; Operation Roast
- Awards: Victoria Cross; Military Cross & Two Bars

Major Anders Frederik Emil Victor Schau Lassen, VC, MC & Two Bars (22 September 1920 – 9 April 1945), was a Danish military officer who was the only non-Commonwealth recipient of the Victoria Cross during the Second World War. Serving in the British Army, he was posthumously awarded the award for his actions during Operation Roast on 8 April 1945 at Lake Comacchio in Italy in the final weeks of the Italian campaign.

Lassen was ordered to lead a raid that would give the impression that a major landing was being undertaken. Lassen fulfilled his mission by destroying three enemy positions before being mortally wounded. As his men's lives would be endangered in the withdrawal, he refused to be evacuated from the area.

== Early life and background ==
Anders Lassen was born on the Høvdingsgård estate near Mern, Vordingborg Municipality, the son of estate owners Emil Victor Schau Lassen and Suzanne Maria Signe Lassen. Lassen's paternal grandfather A. F. J. C. Lassen, made his fortune as the owner of a tobacco plantation on Sumatra. In 1917, Lassen's father took over the Høvdingsgård estate. Lassen was a first cousin of Axel von dem Bussche, a German Resistance member who unsuccessfully tried to kill Adolf Hitler in 1943.

== Military career ==
While serving in Denmark's merchant navy, Lassen came to the United Kingdom shortly after the start of the Second World War where he joined the British Commandos in 1940, serving with No. 62 Commando (also known as the Small Scale Raiding Force). The unit was formed around a small group of commandos under the command of the Special Operations Executive (SOE). He was commissioned in the field on the General List and awarded an immediate Military Cross for his part in Operation Postmaster, the capture of three Italian and German ships from the neutral Spanish colonial island of Fernando Po, now known as Bioko, in the Gulf of Guinea.

In early 1943, No. 62 Commando was disbanded, and its members were dispersed among other formations. Lassen was among a number who went to the Middle East to serve in the Special Boat Section, then attached to the Special Air Service. Others joined the 2nd SAS under the command of Bill Stirling (1911-1983), elder brother of David Stirling. During his time in the SBS, Lassen rose in rank to become a major by October 1944. During his service he fought in North-West Europe, North Africa, Crete, the Aegean islands, mainland Greece, Yugoslavia and Italy. He was awarded two further bars to his Military Cross on 27 September 1943 and 15 February 1944.

On 24 April 1944, he led a successful SBS raid on Santorini, taking out the garrison on the island and blowing up the building housing the radio installation with time bombs. Lassen and the force, with only two casualties, successfully withdrew on two schooners.

Lassen was notably proficient with the bow and arrow, which he took on training missions during the war. He petitioned the War Office to make the bow available for combat, but was denied on the grounds that it was inhumane. He was known by his training partners as the "Robin Hood Commando."

== Victoria Cross ==
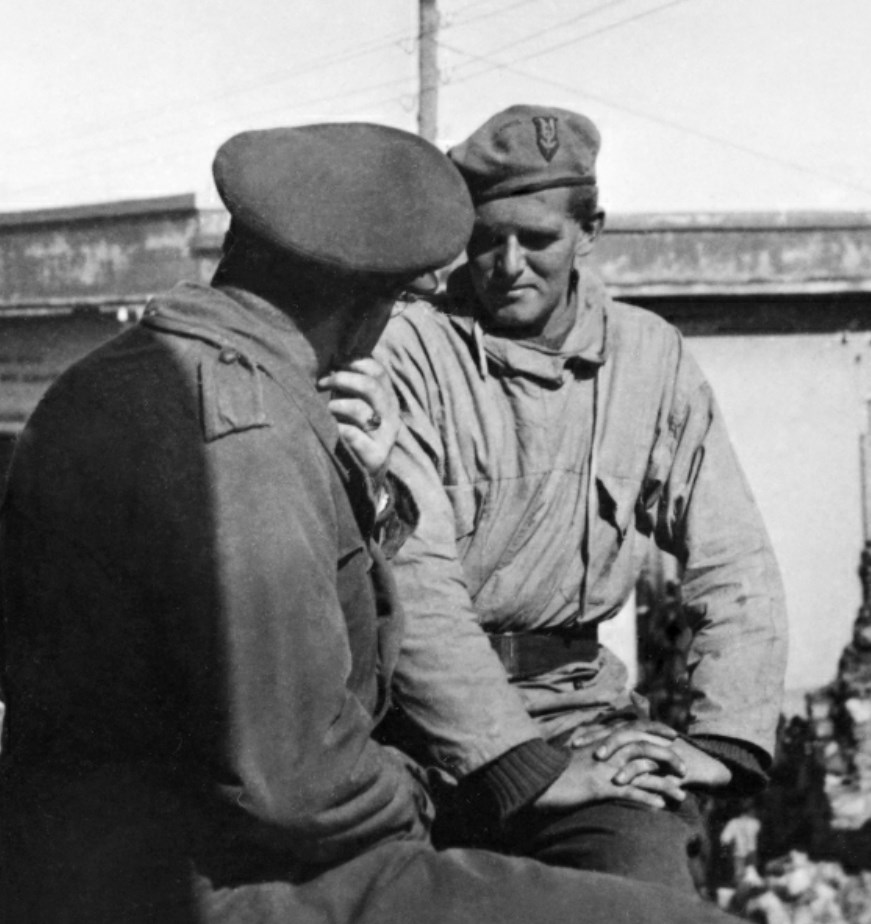
Major Anders Lassen (right) in 1945, discussing the forthcoming Lake Comacchio raid, in which he and his men were tasked to cross impossible terrain

Lassen, who was 24 years old, was serving as a temporary major in the British Special Boat Section when he was awarded the Victoria Cross. The citation published in the London Gazette on 4 September 1945 gave the following details:

The KING has been graciously pleased to approve the posthumous award of the Victoria Cross to: Major (temporary) Anders Frederik Emil Victor Schau LASSEN, M.C. (234907), General List.

In Italy, on the night of 8/9 April 1945, Major Lassen was ordered to take out a patrol of one officer and seventeen other ranks to raid the north shore of Lake Comacchio.

His tasks were to cause as many casualties and as much confusion as possible, to give the impression of a major landing, and to capture prisoners. No previous reconnaissance was possible, and the party found itself on a narrow road flanked on both sides by water.

Preceded by two scouts, Major Lassen led his men along the road towards the town. They were challenged after approximately 500 yards from a position on the side of the road. An attempt to allay suspicion by answering that they were fishermen returning home failed, for when moving forward again to overpower the sentry, machinegun fire started from the position, and also from two other blockhouses to the rear.

Major Lassen himself then attacked with grenades, and annihilated the first position containing four Germans and two machineguns. Ignoring the hail of bullets sweeping the road from three enemy positions, an additional one having come into action from 300 yards down the road, he raced forward to engage the second position under covering fire from the remainder of the force. Throwing in more grenades he silenced this position which was then overrun by his patrol. Two enemy were killed, two captured and two more machine-guns silenced.

By this time the force had suffered casualties and its firepower was very considerably reduced. Still under a heavy cone of fire Major Lassen rallied and reorganised his force and brought his fire to bear on the third position. Moving forward himself he flung in more grenades which produced a cry of "Kamerad". He then went forward to within three or four yards of the position to order the enemy outside, and to take their surrender.

While shouting to them to come out he was hit by a burst of spandau fire from the left of the position and he fell mortally wounded, but even while falling he flung a grenade, wounding some of the occupants, and enabling his patrol to dash in and capture this final position.

Major Lassen refused to be evacuated as he said it would impede the withdrawal and endanger further lives, and as ammunition was nearly exhausted the force had to withdraw.

By his magnificent leadership and complete disregard for his personal safety, Major Lassen had, in the face of overwhelming superiority, achieved his objects. Three positions were wiped out, accounting for six machine guns, killing eight and wounding others of the enemy, and two prisoners were taken. The high sense of devotion to duty and the esteem in which he was held by the men he led, added to his own magnificent courage, enabled Major Lassen to carry out all the tasks he had been given with complete success.

== Commemoration ==
Lassen is buried at the Argenta Gap War Cemetery grave II, E, 11. His Victoria Cross medal is on display at the Frihedsmuseet (Museum of Danish Resistance) in Copenhagen, Denmark. A bust of him was installed in Churchillparken (Churchill Park) outside the museum in 1987. Near the site of the action where Lassen earned his Victoria Cross, the Italians have erected a monument to Lassen and his men. This monument is situated alongside the SP1b highway, southeast of the township, and just to the north of its intersection with the Via del Camposanto.

== Awards and honours ==

1st Row	Victoria Cross			Military Cross (two bars)	
2nd Row	1939–45 Star	Africa Star	Italy Star	Defence Medal	War Medal 1939–1945
3rd Row	King Christian X’s Commemorative Medal for Participation in the War 1940–45			Greek War Cross 3rd class	

== Gallery ==
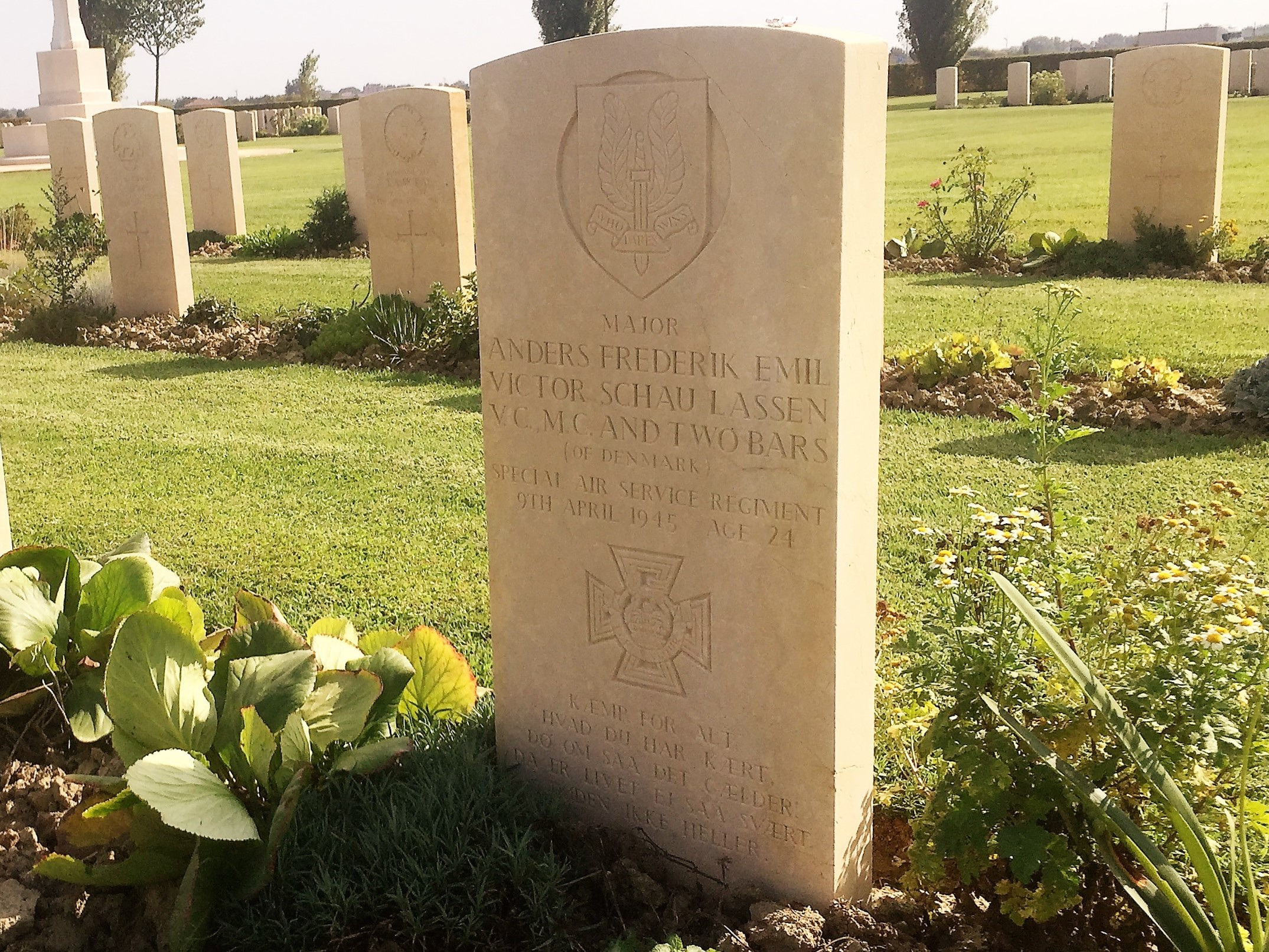
Major Anders Lassen's grave at Argenta Gap War Cemetery, 1 September 2015.

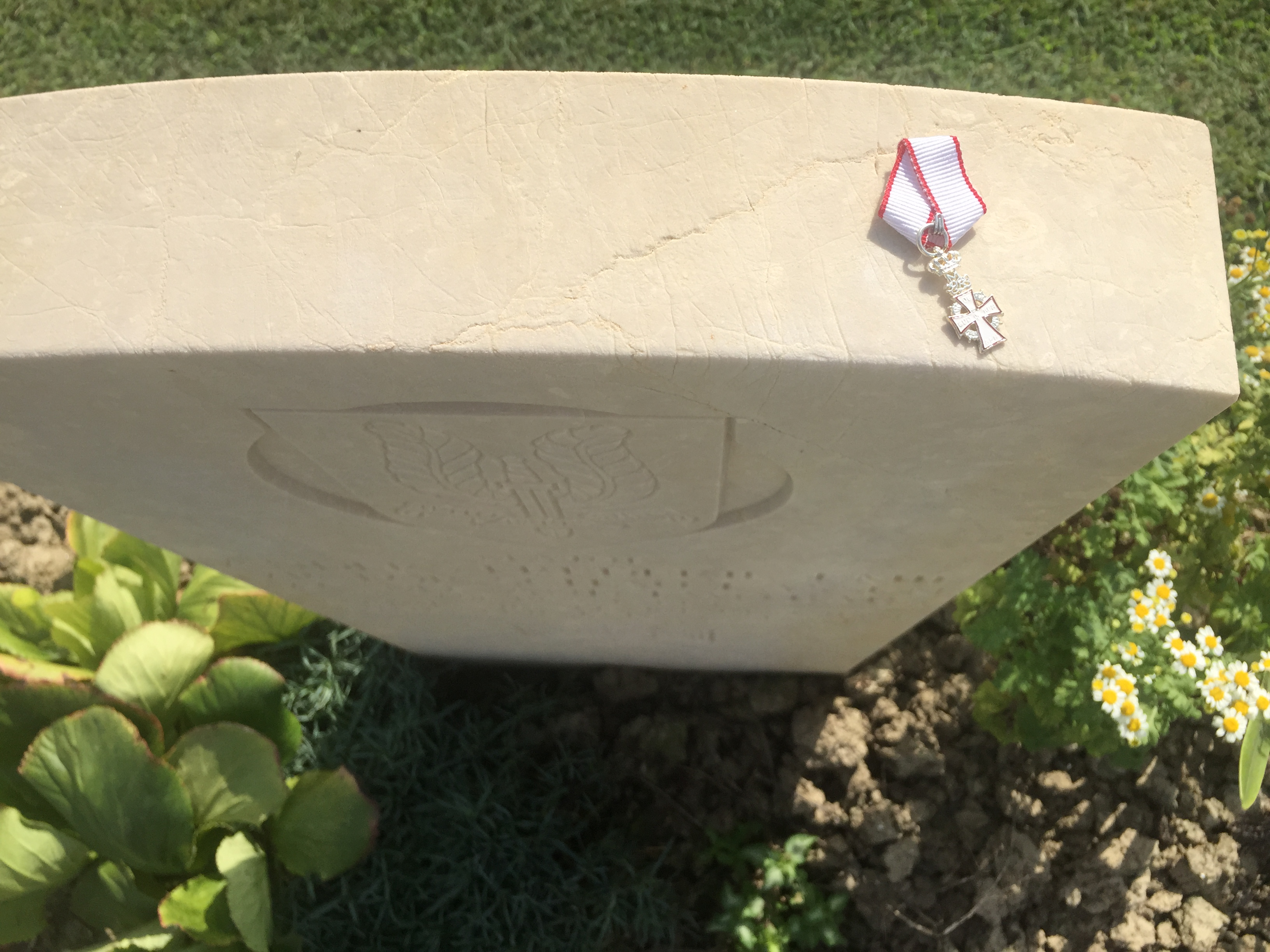
Miniature insignia of the Danish Order of the Dannebrog on Major Anders Lassen's gravestone at Argenta Gap War Cemetery, 1 September 2015. Text: "Gud og Kongen" - "God and the King".

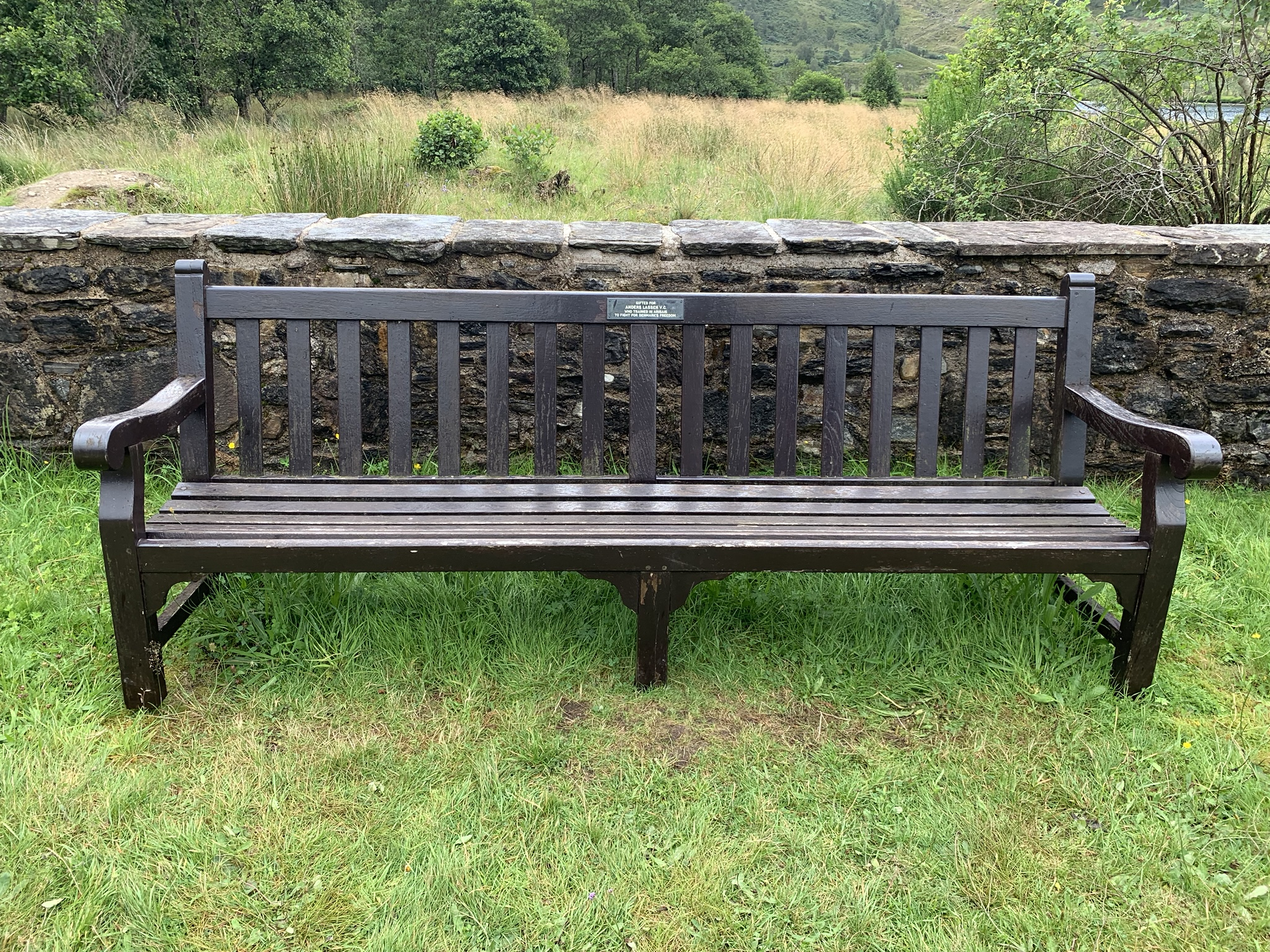
English: Anders Lassen's bench donated at the Glenfinnan monument in Scotland

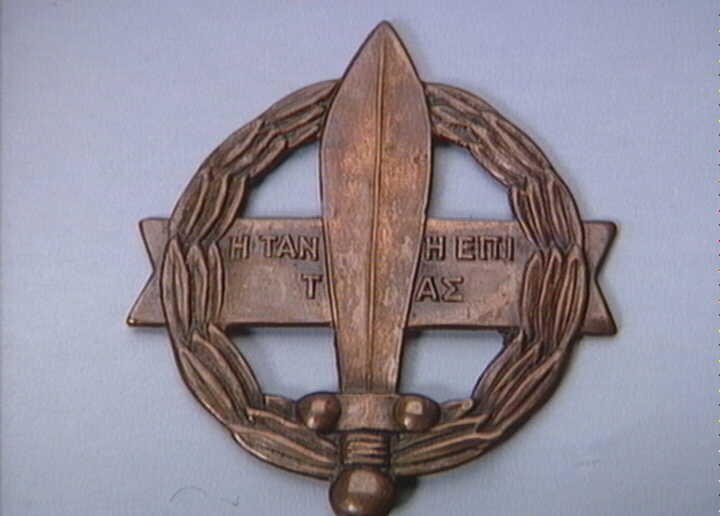
Greek Sacred Band memorial badge awarded to Lassen and now in the collection of the Museum of Danish Resistance in Copenhagen.

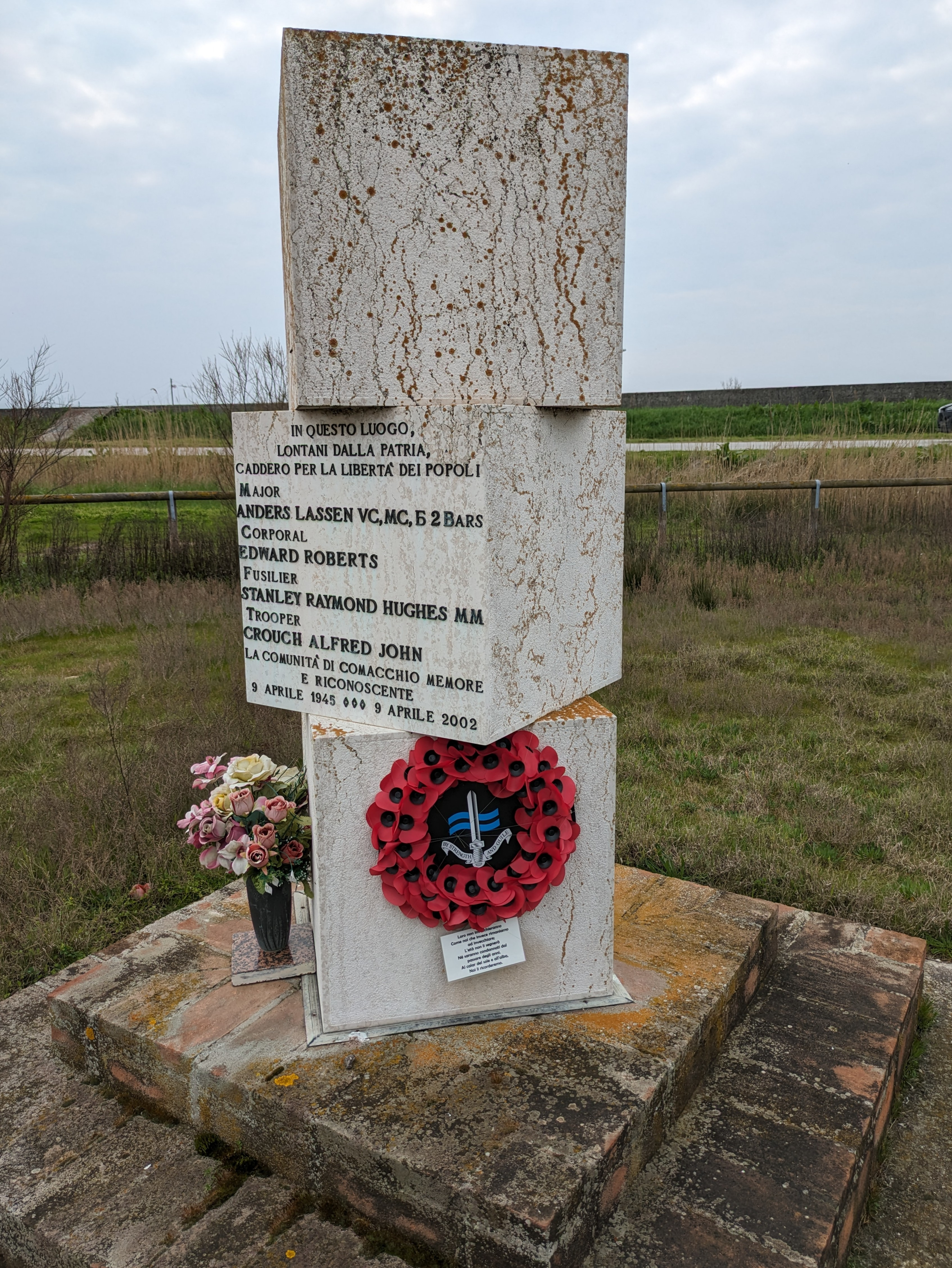
Memorial for Maj. Lassen and his men near Comacchio, Italy, 16 Mar 2024.

== Bibliography ==
- Langley, Mike (2016). Anders Lassen VC, MC, of the SAS. Pen and Sword Books. ISBN 978-1473879515.
- Chappell, Mike (2012). Army Commandos 1940–45. Osprey Publishing. ISBN 978-1855325791.
- Richards, Brooks; Foot, M R D (2002). Clandestine Sea Operations to Brittany: 1940 – 1944. Routledge. ISBN 0-7146-5316-0.
- Mortimer, Gavin (2013). The Special Boat Squadron in WW2. Osprey Publishing. ISBN 978-1782001898.
