= Graham Hayes =

British Army Commandos officer

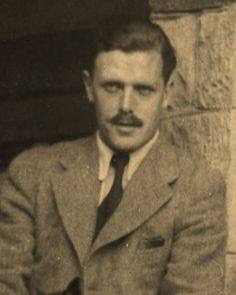
- Born: 9 July 1914
- Died: 13 July 1943 (aged 29); Fresnes Prison, near Paris, France
- Burial place: Viroflay New Communal Cemetery (Yvelines, France)
- Military career
- Allegiance: United Kingdom
- Branch: British Army
- Service years: 1939–1943
- Rank: Captain
- Service number: 129354
- Units: Border Regiment; No. 62 Commando (Small Scale Raiding Force)
- Conflicts: Second World War
- Awards: Military Cross

Graham Hayes, MC (9 July 1914 – 13 July 1943) was a British commando in the Small Scale Raiding Force in the Second World War.

== Early life ==
Hayes was the son of Herbert Charles and Lilian Grace Hayes, of Linton-on-Wharfe, Yorkshire. He was educated at Clayesmore School in Blandford, Dorset. His brother, Flying Officer Malcolm Cedric Hayes, also died in service in the Second World War.

== Pre-war activities ==
Before the war, Hayes went to Mariehamn in Finland and signed onto the windjammer Pommern, on which he sailed around the world via Cape Horn and Australia. This sea-faring experience was put to good use during his military career.

== Wartime activities ==
Hayes was the third founding member of the Small Scale Raiding Force (SSRF), a unit formed around a small group of commandos under the command of the Special Operations Executive (SOE). The commandos were formed in 1940 by order of British Prime Minister Winston Churchill, who called for specially trained troops who would "develop a reign of terror down the enemy coast", and by 1943 had become lightly equipped assault infantry specialising in spearheading amphibious landings.

=== Operation Postmaster ===
The objective of Operation Postmaster was to board three Italian and German ships in the harbour on the Spanish island of Fernando Po, now known as Bioko, off West Africa and sail them to Lagos in Nigeria. The SSRF successfully captured the ships: Duchessa d'Aosta, an Italian 8,500-ton merchant vessel; Likomba, a large German tugboat; and Bibundi, a diesel-powered barge.

Following the operation, Hayes was awarded the Military Cross.

The 2024 film The Ministry of Ungentlemanly Warfare is very loosely based on Operation Postmaster. The part of Graham Hayes as Henry Hayes was played by Hero Fiennes Tiffin.

=== Operation Aquatint ===
Operation Aquatint was planned for a night in mid-September 1942 as a reconnaissance mission near Sainte-Honorine-des-Pertes, a small coastal town near Port en Bessin in Normandy. The mission was to collect information about the surrounding area and take a German guard prisoner. After the mission and on their way back to the beach to rejoin the Motor Torpedo Boat which had dropped them off, a German patrol with machine guns and hand grenades fired on the SSRF commandos. They attempted to swim out to the MTB, that by then had also been discovered and was under fire, but unable to locate the MTB in the darkness, were forced to swim back to the beach.

Hayes came ashore beside Asnieres-en-Bessin and was one of only four members of the 11-man team to escape. He managed to evade capture and made contact with a local French family, who provided him with civilian clothing and helped him contact the French resistance. He was taken by train to Lisieux and after several weeks reached Paris, and was then moved along an escape line to the Spanish border, arriving in October 1942. After crossing into Spain, he was stopped by Spanish border guards who handed him over to the Germans; it is believed he had been betrayed by French double agent Jean-Louis Ortet, codename "Armand". Hayes was returned to Paris and held in solitary confinement in Fresnes Prison for nine months before being executed by firing squad on 13 July 1943.

Hayes was buried at Viroflay New Communal Cemetery (Yvelines France), and is commemorated at Linton Memorial Hall, near Wetherby West Yorkshire, along with his brother, Flying Officer Malcolm Hayes, who is buried in Saumur Communal Cemetery.
