= Operation Barricade =

1942 British Commando mission in France

- Part of North West Europe Campaign
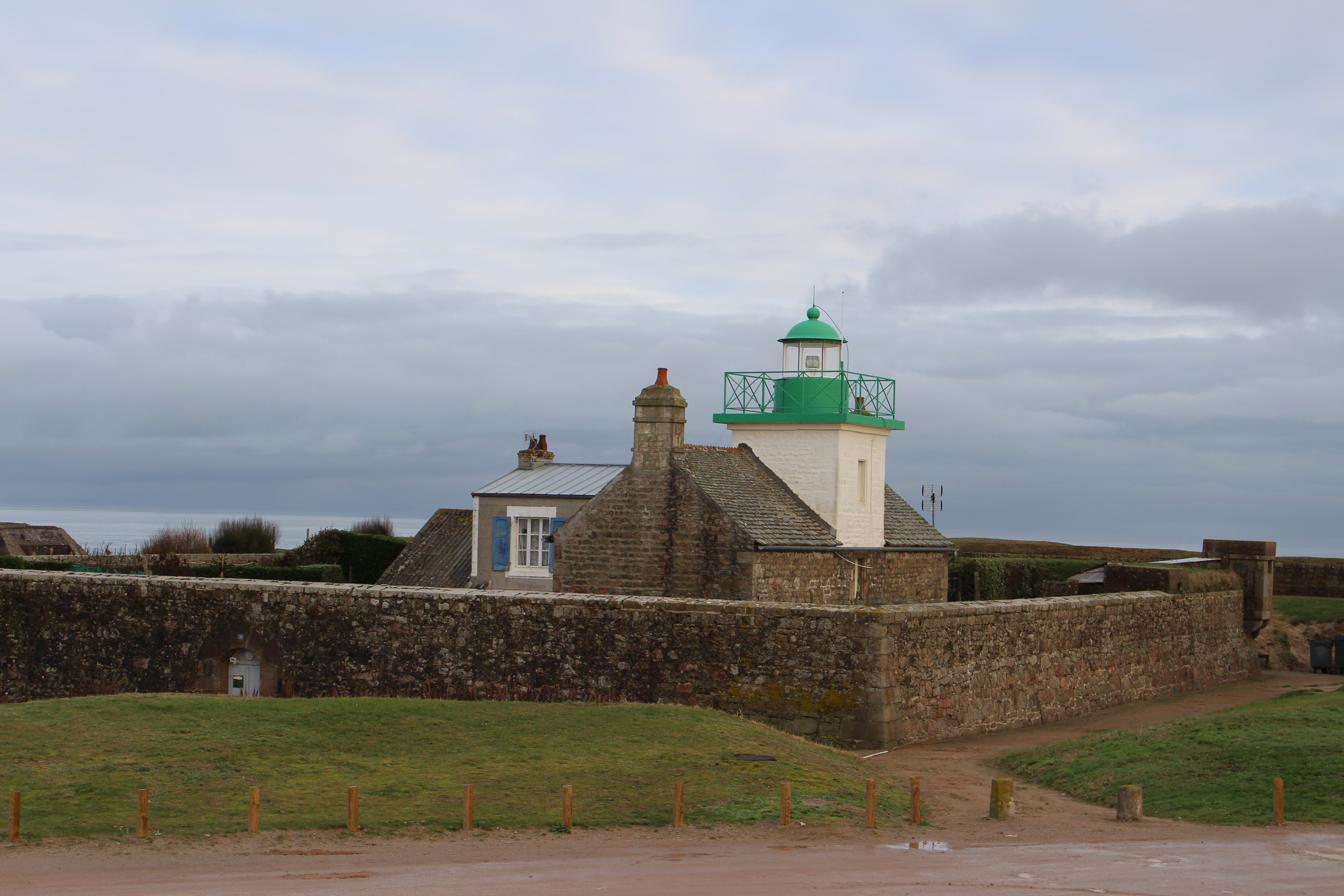
- Pointe de Saire lighthouse
| Date | 14-15 August 1942 |
| Location | Pointe de Saire, Normandy, France |
| Result | Indecisive |

Belligerents
| United Kingdom | (Nazi Germany) Germany |

Commanders and leaders
| (United Kingdom) Gus March-Phillipps | (Nazi Germany) Karl-Wilhelm von Schlieben |

Units involved
| (United Kingdom) No. 62 Commando | (Nazi Germany) 709th Infantry Division |

Strength
| 11 Allied commandos 1 Motor Torpedo Boat | 1 anti-air gun crew 1 radar site Numerous bunkers |

Casualties and losses
| None | Three killed, six wounded |

Operation Barricade was a British Commando raid during the Second World War. It was carried out by 11 men of No. 62 Commando over the night of 14/15 August 1942, and had as its objective an anti-aircraft gun and radar site north-west of Pointe de Saire south of Barfleur. The raiders, led by Major Gus March-Phillipps, crossed the English Channel by Motor Torpedo Boat.

They opened fire on a German patrol killing three and wounding six, before withdrawing without loss to the Commandos.
