= Operation Aquatint =

1942 Second World War British raid in France

- Part of North West Europe Campaign
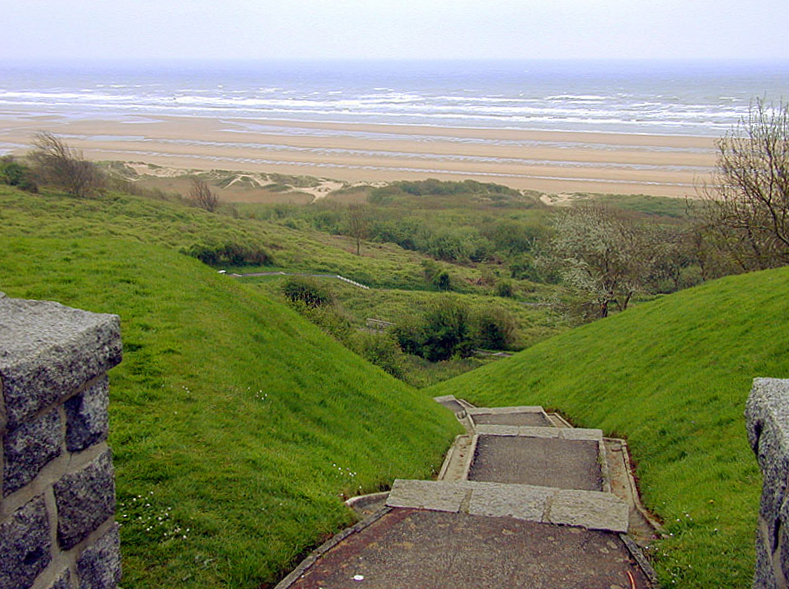
- Omaha Beach
Date	12–13 September 1942
Location	Sainte-Honorine-des-Pertes, Normandy, France
Result	German victory

Belligerents
United Kingdom	(Nazi Germany) Germany

Commanders and leaders
(United Kingdom) Gus March-Phillipps †	(Nazi Germany) Karl Maderholz

Strength
10 British Commandos; 1 Free French Fighter; 1 Motor Torpedo Boat	320th Infantry Division

Casualties and losses
3 killed in action 1 killed in captivity 2 fate unknown 8 captured and 5 survived	Unknown

Operation Aquatint was the codename for a failed raid by British Commandos on the coast of occupied France during the Second World War. The raid was undertaken in September 1942 on part of what later became Omaha Beach by No. 62 Commando, also known as the Small Scale Raiding Force.

Prior to the operation, a raid on the French coastal town of Dieppe had placed the German occupying forces on a high state of alert, and this ultimately contributed to Aquatint's failure. The commandos were also unable to identify their correct landing place due to the darkness. Within minutes of landing, the raiding party was ambushed by a German patrol and forced to try to reach their Motor Torpedo Boat (MTB) transport. The MTB was located and engaged by the German shore batteries, which damaged one of its engines. It was forced to withdraw, leaving the commandos behind. At the end of the raid those commandos who had not been killed all became prisoners of war. Only five of the raiding force would survive the war; one was killed in captivity and the fate of the other two is uncertain.

== Background ==
Following a request from the Chief of Combined Operations Admiral Louis Mountbatten for probes of German coastal defences, No. 62 Commando, also known as the Small Scale Raiding Force (SSRF), (Note: The Small Scale Raiding Force was normally under operational control of the Special Operations Executive.) mounted a number of operations in 1942. The first three missions were complete successes: Operation Barricade (14/15 August 1942), Operation Dryad, (2/3 September 1942), and Operation Pound (7/8 September 1942). Aquatint was planned for a night in mid September 1942 as a reconnaissance mission near Sainte-Honorine-des-Pertes, a small coastal town near Port en Bessin in Normandy. The mission was to collect information about the surrounding area, and take a German guard prisoner. Aerial reconnaissance had identified a small group of houses on the seafront thought to be occupied by Germans. (Note: This area later became known as Dog sector, Omaha Beach.)

The size of the SSRF landing party was limited to how many could be carried aboard a Motor Torpedo Boat (MTB), (Note: Nicknamed the Little Pisser, MTB 344 was built in 1942. She was capable of 40 knots and was 60 feet (18 m) in length. Armament consisted of two British 18 inch torpedoes, two Vickers machine guns, and Lewis guns. The normal crew complement was six or seven men.) and comprised five officers, one warrant officer, one senior non-commissioned officer, three other ranks, and a member of the Free French forces. The commander of the SSRF, Major 'Gus' March-Phillipps, would lead the raid. His second in command, Captain Geoffrey Appleyard, would remain on board the MTB due to an injury acquired on a previous mission. The other men on the raid were Captain Graham Hayes, Captain John Burton, Captain Lord Francis Howard, Lieutenant Anthony Hall, Company Sergeant Major Thomas Winter, Sergeant Allen Michael Williams, Private Jan Hollings (Jan Hellings) from the Netherlands, Private Adam Orr (Abraham Opoczynski) a refugee Jewish Commando from Poland, Private Richard Leonard (Richard Lehniger) a refugee Jewish Sudeten German from Czechoslovakia, and Maître Andre Desgranges of the Free French Forces.

The Dieppe raid in August 1942 had changed the German fortification plans; the success of the German defences in repelling the raid reinforced the importance of the Atlantic Wall. The Organization Todt had now started to reinforce gun emplacements with infantry strong points along the French coastline. The older gun emplacements based on First World War designs were being replaced by stronger designs with overhead cover to offer protection from air attack. The area of Normandy targeted by Operation Aquatint had yet to receive any concrete gun emplacements but there was a network of coastal artillery batteries able to provide interlocking arcs of fire. German infantry carried out foot patrols in the areas between the batteries.

== Battle ==
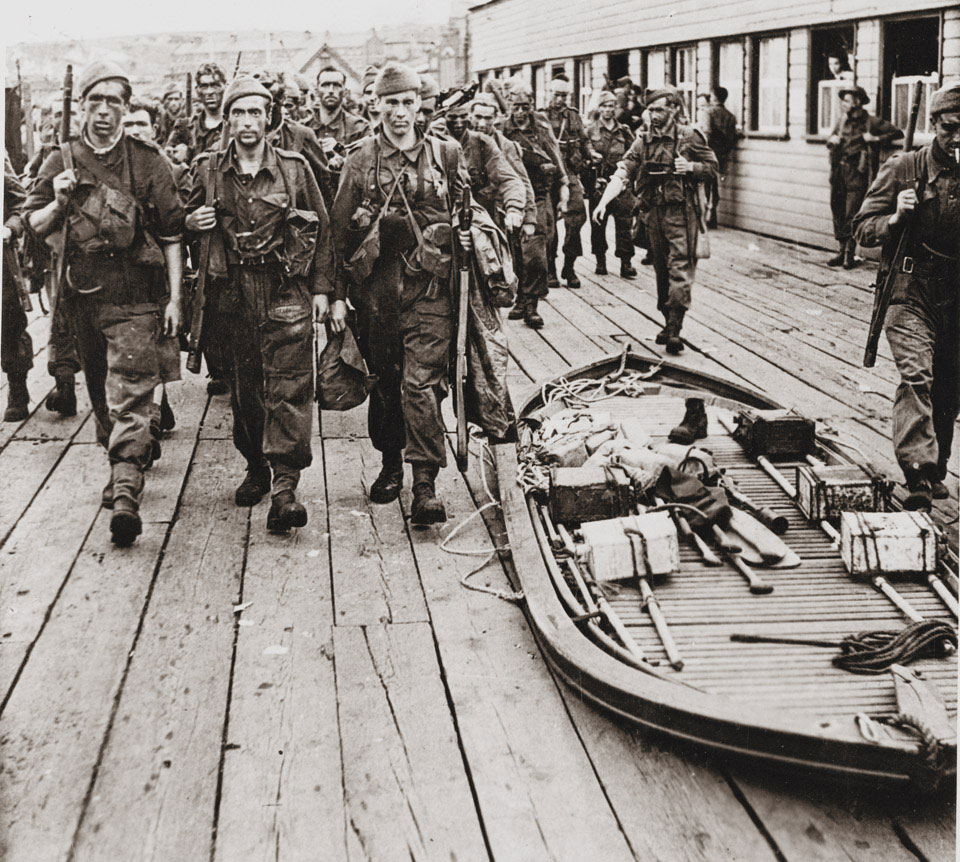
British Commandos marching past a collapsed Goatley boat of the type used in Operation Aquatint

The mission had previously been attempted over the night of 11/12 September 1942, but had to be cancelled after the MTB arrived off the coast of France. The raiding party had been unable to locate their target because of the dark and foggy conditions. On 12 September 1942, their MTB left Portsmouth at 20:12 and reached the coast off Barfleur at about 22:00. Moving at a reduced speed to avoid detection and avoid the offshore mine fields, they reached their intended position offshore just after midnight on 13 September 1942. Observing the coastline, in the dark they incorrectly identified a valley which they believed was St Honorine, but was actually Saint-Laurent-sur-Mer, about one mile to the right of their intended target. At around 00:20 hours the landing party headed toward the beach in a small collapsible flat bottomed boat known as a Goatley boat. After reaching the shore they realised they were too close to some houses to leave their boat where it was. They dragged the boat 200 yards (180 m) east away from the houses and above the high water mark. Captain Lord Howard guarded the boat while the rest of the SSRF checked the area to ensure it was safe and they had not been observed landing.

On their way back to the beach they sighted a German patrol of about seven or eight men coming from the direction of the houses so they took cover. They were discovered by the patrol's guard dog at about 00:50. The patrol opened fire on them with machine guns and hand grenades. The SSRF managed to disperse the German patrol with return fire and reach the Goatley boat. Captain Lord Howard, who had been left to guard the boat, was wounded trying to re-float the boat, and the others managed to get him aboard. The fight lasted for about 30 minutes. When the German patrol moved forward onto the beach, Lieutenant Hall tried to capture one of the Germans but was himself hit over the head and captured. The SSRF left him behind, presuming he was dead. The men in the Goatley boat had managed to get about 100 yards (91 m) out to sea when it was located and engaged by three machine gun posts above the beach. A gun emplacement to the west also starting firing towards them with heavier calibre guns. The combined fire from four positions damaged the boat, which began to sink. The commandos attempted to swim out to the MTB, which by now had also been discovered and was under fire. Unable to locate it in the darkness, they were forced to swim back to the beach. Winter was fired on again when he reached the beach and was captured. He was taken to the German headquarters where he was put into a room with Captain Lord Howard and Desgranges, who had also been captured.

The MTB had withdrawn out of range at about 01:30, but not before it had suffered engine damage; a bullet had disabled the starboard engine. After 10 minutes it moved back inshore hoping to pick up any survivors. It was again located by the Germans at about 02:30. The MTB was forced to withdraw once again under increasingly heavy mortar and machine gun fire. Unable to locate any survivors, it recrossed the German minefield and arrived back in Portsmouth at 10:00.

== Aftermath ==
Later on the morning of 13 September 1942 Winter and Desgranges were ordered to collect the bodies of the men who had been killed on the beach. Of the 11 men who went ashore, three were killed: Major March-Phillips, Sergeant Williams, and Private Leonard; four were captured (the seriously wounded pair Captain Lord Howard and Lieutenant Hall, with Winter and Desgranges); and four others had escaped.

Later on 13 September 1942 Captain Lord Howard and Lieutenant Hall were hospitalised because of their injuries, while Winter and Desgranges were taken to Caen for interrogation. At the time, the Germans were unaware that four commandos—Captain Burton, Privates Hollings and Orr, and Captain Hayes—had managed to evade capture and made it off the beach.

On 14 September 1942, the Germans issued a communiqué:

During the night of 12/13 September 1942, British soldiers attempted to land on the channel coast, to the east of Cherbourg. Their presence was immediately detected by the German defences, opening fire and sinking a boat.

A second communiqué on 15 September 1942 read:

During the night of 12/13 September, guards of the coast defences to the east of the Cotentin (Cherbourg peninsula), located an attempt by the enemy to land on a beach. Several men attempted to cross the beach while their disembarkation boat, attempting to return to sea, was hit and sunk. Those on the beach were killed or taken prisoner. All were members of the British army except one, a Frenchman officer of the Gaullist forces.

The bodies of the dead were buried in the St-Laurent-sur-Mer cemetery on 15 September 1942. The funeral was only attended by the local German and the French Gendarmarie commanders. To prevent anyone else from attending, the Germans had a machine gun set up covering the cemetery.

After 10 days of questioning Winter was taken to Rennes, where he was joined three days later by Captain Burton, Hollings, and Orr. These three had managed to stay together when the boat was sunk, and were captured by a German parachute unit carrying out manoeuvres. Burton was sent to a prisoner of war camp in Germany, Winter, Hollings and Orr were taken to Frankfurt and handed over to the Gestapo for further questioning, after which Winter was sent to a prisoner of war camp at Memmingen. The fate of Hollings and Orr has never been established. However Orr aka Opoczynski, a Jewish soldier, has a war grave at Durnbach dated 9/4/45. Winter and a Special Air Service officer escaped from the camp in April 1945, disguised as French soldiers. Desgranges was also able to escape from captivity, travelling via Spain to Britain, where he joined the Special Operations Executive (SOE).

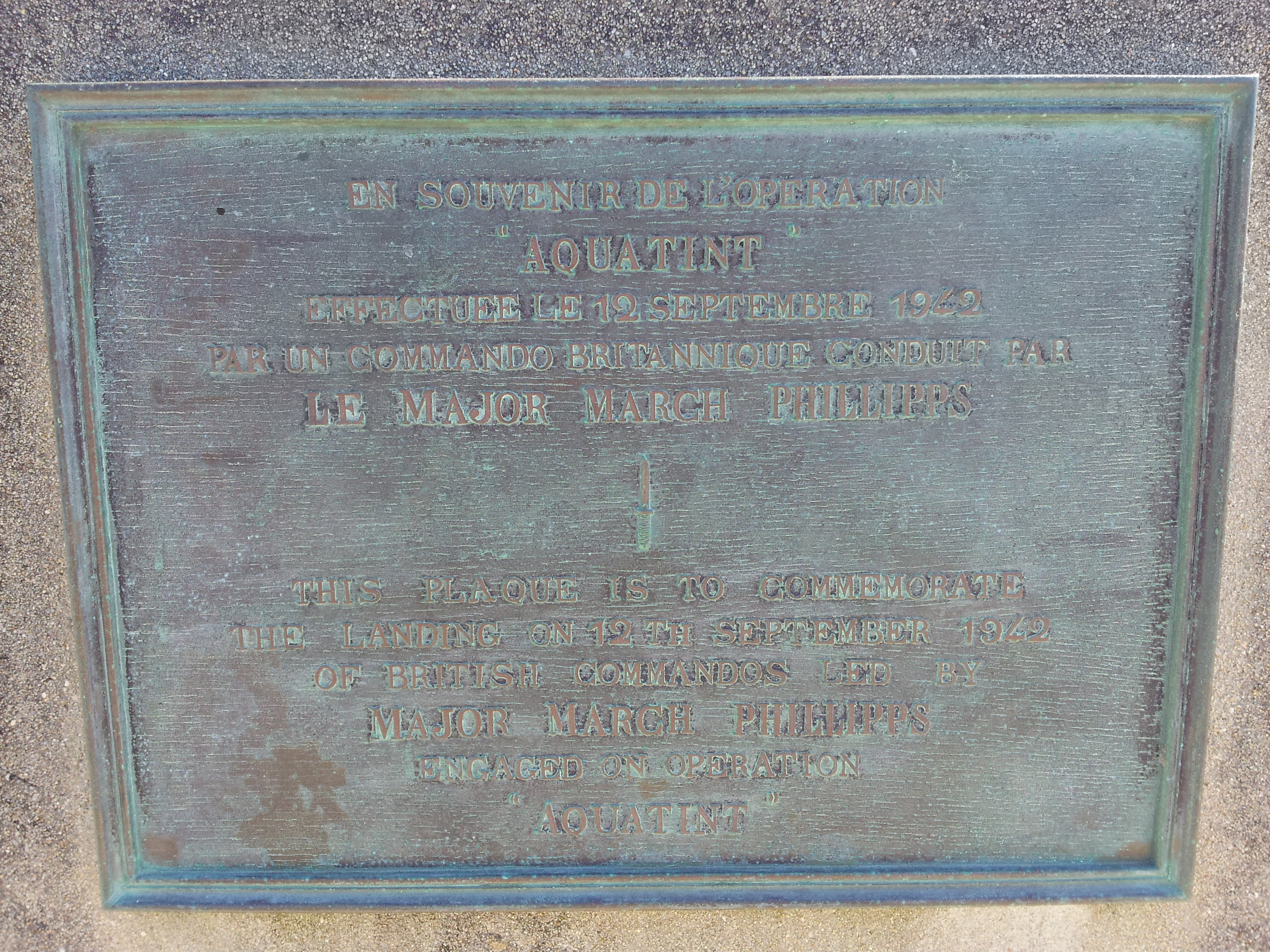
Marker on Omaha Beach

Captain Hayes, unable to reach the MTB, had started swimming away from the shooting, and came ashore beside Asnieres-en-Bessin. He managed to evade capture and made contact with a local French family who provided him with civilian clothing and contacted the French resistance. Hayes was taken by train to Lisieux and after several weeks reached Paris. Hayes was moved along an escape line to the Spanish border, arriving in October 1942. After crossing into Spain he was stopped by Spanish border guards who handed him over to the Germans. Hayes was returned to Paris and imprisoned in Fresnes prison. He was kept in solitary confinement for nine months before being executed by firing squad on 13 July 1943. Hayes had landed in uniform and should have been considered a prisoner of war, but he was executed following the issue of the Commando Order which called for the execution of all commandos upon capture. It was discovered after the war that Hayes had been betrayed to the Germans, who were aware of all his movements from Normandy to the Spanish border. The persons believed responsible for Hayes' betrayal were never punished, as they convinced the authorities they were acting as double agents.

Despite the results of the operation, the SOE and Combined Operations Headquarters believed that the SSRF could still be of use, and ensured that it was not dissolved. Command of the unit was given to the newly promoted Major Appleyard. At the end of 1942, most of SSRF were moved to Algeria and absorbed into the 2nd Special Air Service Regiment. Appleyard did not survive the war. He was returning from a Special Air Service mission when his plane was reported missing. It was the same day that Captain Hayes was executed in Paris.

== Notes ==
Footnotes

Citations
