= No. 62 Commando =

- Active: 1941–43
- Country: United Kingdom
- Branch: British Army
- Type: Commando
- Role: Amphibious warfare Close-quarters combat Desert warfare Direct action Raiding
- Size: 55 men maximum
- Part of: Combined Operations; Special Operations Executive
- Garrison/HQ: Anderson Manor, Poole
- Nickname: Small Scale Raiding Force
- Engagements: Second World War: Operation Postmaster; Operation Barricade; Operation Dryad; Operation Branford; Operation Aquatint; Operation Basalt; Operation Huckabuck; Operation Batman; Operation Fahrenheit

No. 62 Commando or the Small Scale Raiding Force (SSRF) was a British Commando unit of the British Army during the Second World War. The unit was formed around a small group of commandos under the command of the Special Operations Executive (SOE). They carried out a number of raids before being disbanded in 1943.

== Background ==
The commandos were formed in 1940 by order of Winston Churchill, the British Prime Minister. He called for specially trained troops who would "develop a reign of terror down the enemy coast". At first they were a small force of volunteers who carried out small raids in enemy-occupied territory, but by 1943 their role had changed and they had become lightly equipped assault infantry specialising in spearheading amphibious landings.

The man initially selected as the commander of the force was Admiral Sir Roger Keyes, himself a veteran of the landings at Galipoli and the Zeebrugge raid during the First World War. Keyes resigned in October 1941 and was replaced by Admiral Louis Mountbatten.

By the autumn of 1940 more than 2,000 men had volunteered for commando training and what became known as the Special Service Brigade was formed into 12 units called commandos. Each commando numbered about 450 men and was commanded by a lieutenant colonel. Each was divided into troops of 75 men and further divided into sections of 15 men. Commandos were all volunteers seconded from other British Army regiments, and retained their own cap badges and remained on their regimental rolls for pay. All volunteers went through a six-week intensive commando course at Achnacarry in the Scottish Highlands, which concentrated on fitness, speed marches, weapons training, map reading, climbing, small boat operations, and demolitions both by day and by night.

By 1943 the commandos had moved away from small raiding operations and most of them had been formed into brigades of assault infantry to spearhead future Allied landing operations. Three units were left unbrigaded to carry out smaller-scale raids.

== Operations ==
No. 62 Commando, formed in 1941, consisted of a small group of 55 commando-trained personnel working under the Special Operations Executive (SOE), where it was also known as the Small Scale Raiding Force (SSRF). Under the operational control of Combined Operations Headquarters, No. 62 Commando was commanded by Major Gustavus Henry March-Phillipps. Its first operation, Operation Postmaster, was in January 1942, when March-Phillipps led the seizure of an Italian liner, a German tanker and a yacht from Fernando Po. The SSRF used HM MTB 344, a motor torpedo boat nicknamed The Little Pisser because of its outstanding turn of speed. The SSRF carried out a number of cross-channel operations, but had mixed fortunes. Operation Barricade and Operation Dryad were complete successes, but Operation Aquatint, on 12/13 September 1942 at Sainte-Honorine on the coast of Normandy, resulted in the loss of all the men involved, including March-Phillipps. One member of the raiding party, Captain Graham Hayes MC, managed to reach France and eventually made his way to Spain, but was betrayed by a French double agent and handed to the Germans. After nine months' solitary confinement in Fresnes Prison he was executed on 13 July 1943.

With the loss of March-Phillipps, Major Geoffrey Appleyard was temporarily given command. On 3/4 October 1942 the SSRF carried out a raid on the Channel Island of Sark, codenamed Operation Basalt, with men from No. 12 Commando attached. After the raid a number of dead and wounded Germans were found tied up (they had been shot while trying to escape), which resulted in the prisoners captured in the Dieppe raid being tied up and the Nazi German Commando Order dictating the execution of all captured commandos. On 17 October 1942, Lieutenant Colonel Bill Stirling, elder brother of David Stirling and an experienced SOE agent, was appointed its commanding officer.

In early 1943 No. 62 Commando was disbanded and its members were dispersed among other formations. A number went to the Middle East and served in the Special Boat Squadron, most notably Major Anders Lassen, the only member of the Special Air Service awarded the Victoria Cross during the war. Appleyard also went to the Middle East and helped to form the 2nd Special Air Service with Bill Stirling from a detachment of No. 62 Commando. Neither Lassen nor Appleyard survived the war.

== Battle honours ==
The following battle honours were awarded to the British Commandos during the Second World War.

- Adriatic
- Alethangyaw
- Aller
- Anzio
- Argenta Gap
- Burma 1943–45
- Crete
- Dieppe
- Dives Crossing
- Djebel Choucha
- Flushing
- Greece 1944–45
- Italy 1943–45
- Kangaw
- Landing at Porto San Venere
- Landing in Sicily
- Leese
- Litani
- Madagascar
- Middle East 1941, 1942, 1944
- Monte Ornito
- Myebon
- Normandy Landing
- North Africa 1941–43
- North-West Europe 1942, 1944–1945
- Norway 1941
- Pursuit to Messina
- Rhine
- St. Nazaire
- Salerno
- Sedjenane 1
- Sicily 1943
- Steamroller Farm
- Syria 1941
- Termoli
- Vaagso
- Valli di Comacchio
- Westkapelle
