= Gus March-Phillipps =

British Army officer

Gustavus Henry March-Phillipps
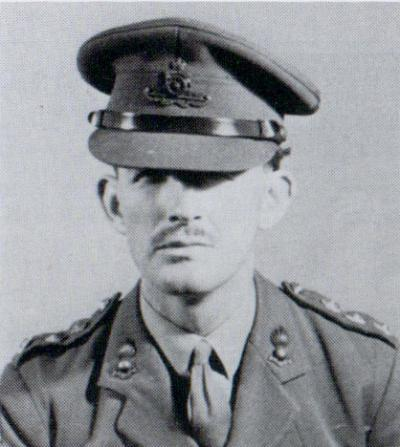
- Born: 1908; England
- Died: 12 September 1942 (aged 34); Sainte-Honorine-des-Pertes, France
- Burial place: Saint-Laurent-sur-Mer
- Spouse: Marjorie Stewart (m. 1942)
- Military career
- Allegiance: United Kingdom
- Branch: British Army
- Rank: Major
- Service number: 39184
- Conflicts: Second World War; Operation Postmaster; Operation Barricade; Operation Dryad; Operation Aquatint †
- Awards: Distinguished Service Order; Member of the Order of the British Empire; Mentioned in Despatches

Gustavus Henry March-Phillipps, DSO, MBE (1908 – 12 September 1942; sometimes misspelled "March-Phillips") was the founder of the British Army's No. 62 Commando, also known as Small Scale Raiding Force (SSRF), one of the forerunners of the Special Air Service (SAS). (Note: SAS was founded in 1941 by David Stirling (under the original name "L Detachment, SAS Brigade"); in 1942, it was renamed into "1st SAS"; in 1943, "2nd SAS" was formed in North Africa from the renamed SSRF.) He was also noteworthy as being one of Ian Fleming's main inspirations for the character of James Bond, alongside Serbian double agent Duško Popov and writer Roald Dahl.

== Early life and education ==
March-Phillipps was the only son among the three children of Lisle March-Phillipps (1860-1917) of Satwell Old Farm, Henley-on-Thames, Oxfordshire. Lisle had fought in the Second Boer War with Rimington's Guides, then wrote about the conflict. Gus' mother was Isabel (died 1938), daughter of barrister Henry John Wastell Coulson, of Newbrough Hall, near Hexham, Northumberland, and Tiverton, Devon, and sister of the soldier Gustavus Hamilton Blenkinsopp Coulson. March-Phillipps was educated at Ampleforth College. In 1777, the March family had become March-Phillipps, seated at Garendon Park, Loughborough, and Grace Dieu Manor at Whitwick, Leicestershire. They were descendants of the Norman knightly family of de Lisle who had accompanied Guillaume le Bâtard to England in 1066. They were mentioned in the Domesday Book. The senior branch of the March Phillipps family assumed that additional surname.

== Military career ==
March-Phillipps was a special operations veteran who proved remarkably successful in his missions.

In The Daily Telegraph, Max Hastings noted: "In January 1942 he launched Operation Postmaster, a picaresque 'cutting-out expedition', which seized two Italian merchant ships from the neutral Spanish colonial port of Santa Isabel in West Africa, and towed them triumphantly to Lagos." After the raid March-Phillipps was awarded the Distinguished Service Order.

He was killed in action during Operation Aquatint, which took place on the German-occupied French coastline in September 1942. Intending to harass the enemy and boost the Allied morale, March-Phillipps led a raiding team of 11 men onto a beach in Goatley canoes. The landing was on an incorrect area of the beach, and they came under heavy fire from a German patrol. Four of the raiders were injured and taken prisoner, four men went on the run but were eventually captured; the rest of the team were killed, including March-Phillipps who was shot when trying to swim ashore after his canoe got damaged.

On the Commando Veterans website, the following note accompanies the text on his gravestone: "In Memory of Major Gustavus Henry March-Phillipps DSO MBE Royal Artillery and Commando, Small Scale Raiding Force who died age 34 on 12 September 1942. Remembered with honour at ST. LAURENT-SUR-MER CHURCHYARD"

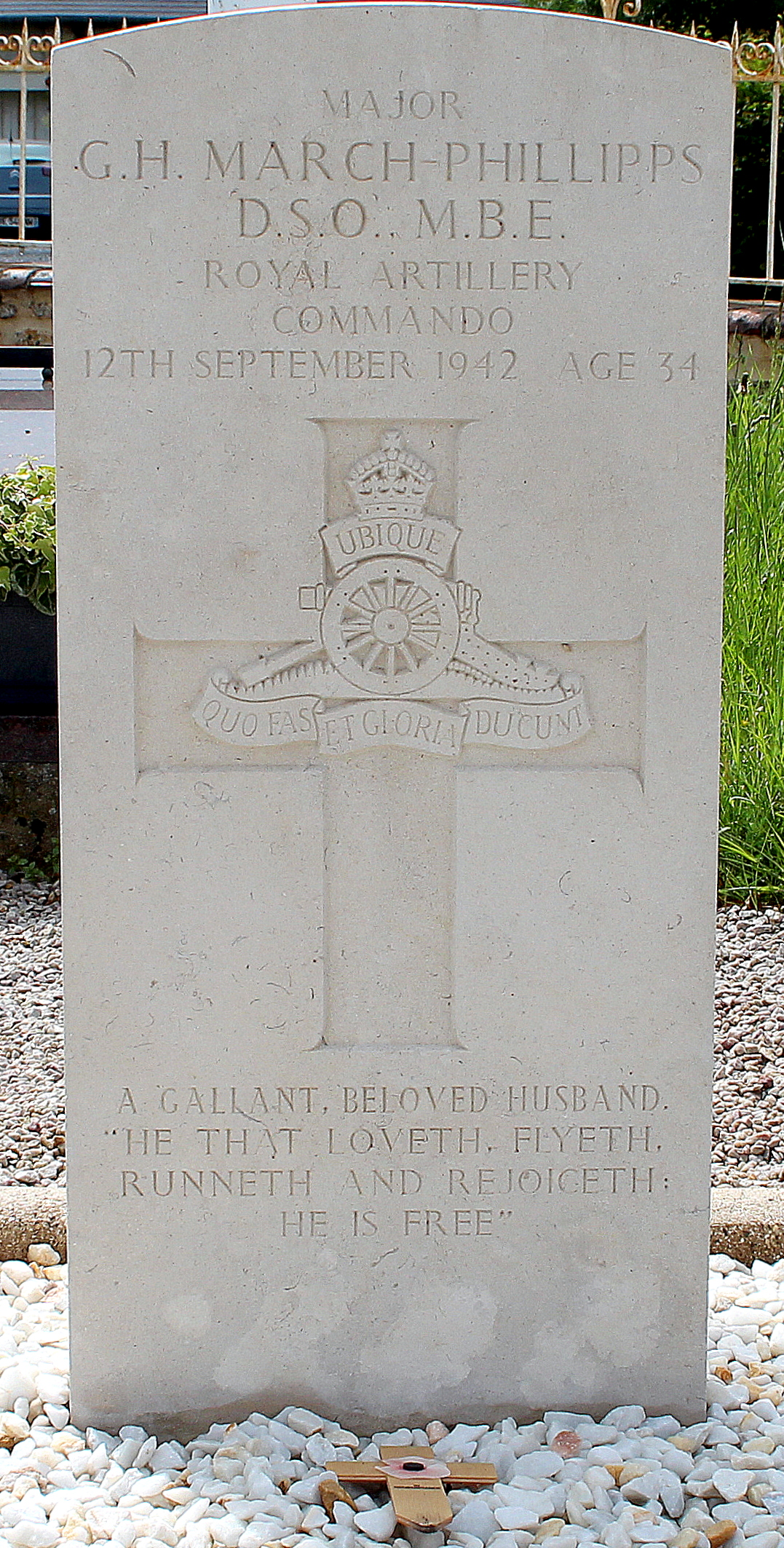
Grave of Gus March-Phillipps, Saint-Laurent-sur-Mer, Normandy, France

== Personal life ==
March-Phillipps married fellow SOE agent Marjorie Stewart (an actress before and after the war, later Lady Marling) on 18 April 1942.

== In popular culture ==
March-Phillipps is portrayed by Henry Cavill in the 2024 film The Ministry of Ungentlemanly Warfare which depicts a heavily fictionalised version of the events of Operation Postmaster.
