= List of Commando raids on the Atlantic Wall =

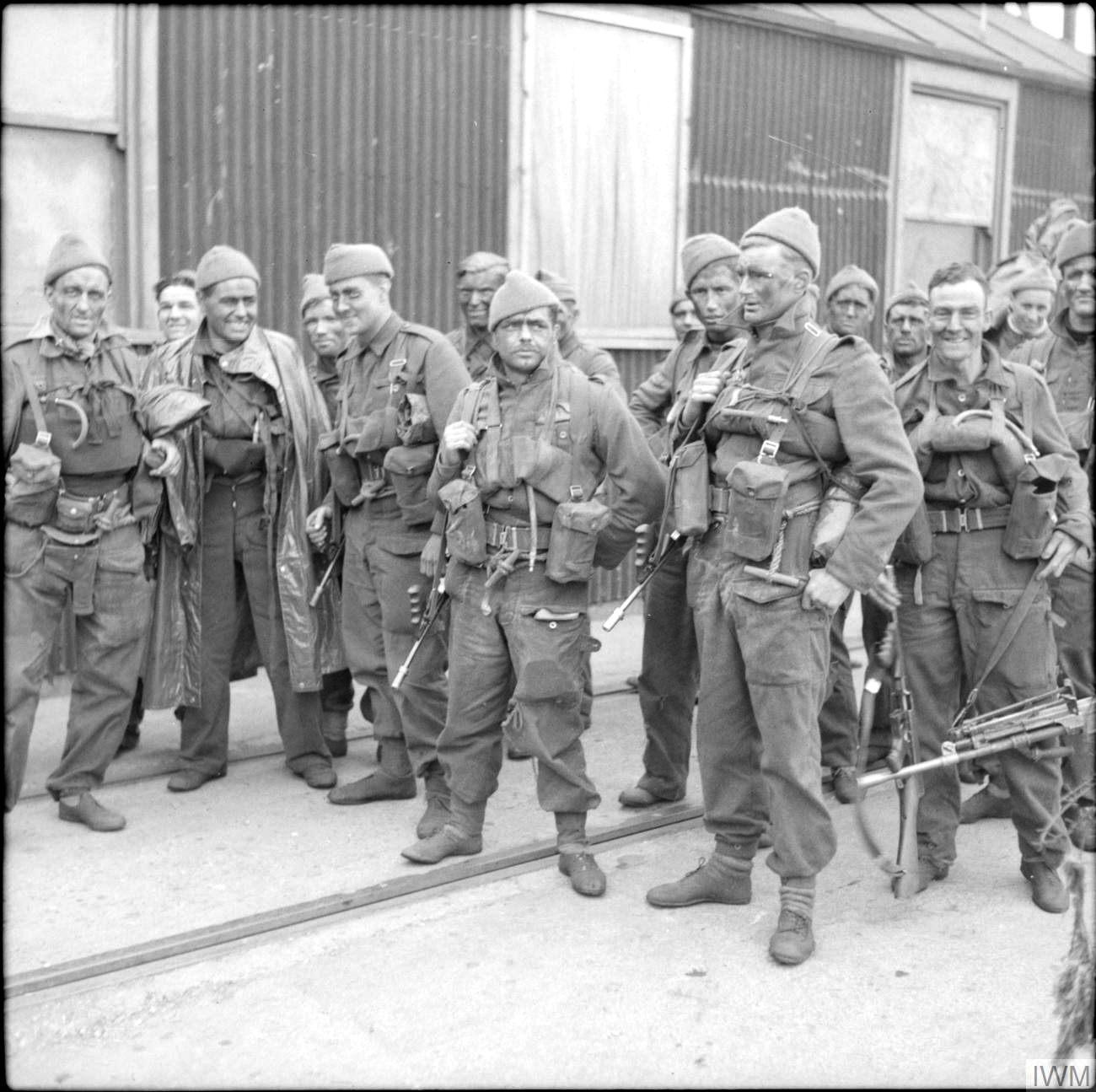
British Commandos after returning from Operation Abercrombie, a raid on the French coast near Boulogne in April 1942

Commando raids were made by the Western Allies during much of the Second World War against the Atlantic Wall. The raids were conducted by the armed forces of Britain, the Commonwealth and a small number of men from the occupied territories serving with No. 10 (Inter-Allied) Commando during the Second World War. All the operations took place between the Arctic Circle in Norway and the France–Spain border, along what was known as the Atlantic Wall.

The raiding forces were mostly provided by the British Commandos, but the two largest raids, Operation Gauntlet and Operation Jubilee, drew heavily on Canadian troops. The size of the raiding force depended on the objective. The smallest raid was two men from No. 6 Commando in Operation J V. The largest raid involved over 10,500 men in Operation Jubilee. Most of the raids were scheduled to only last overnight, but some, like Operation Gauntlet, were conducted over a number of days.

Commando raids during the Second World War became so effective that by October 1942 Adolf Hitler issued the Commando Order, which required the execution of all commandos captured.

The 57 raids were all between 1940 and 1944 and were mostly against targets in France, which saw 36 raids. There were 12 raids in Norway, seven in the Channel Islands and one each in Belgium and the Netherlands. The raids met with a mixture of fortunes. Operation Chariot—the raid against dock installations at Saint-Nazaire—has since been called the greatest raid of all. Others, like Operation Aquatint and Operation Musketoon, resulted in the capture or death of most of the commandos involved.

The raids ended in mid-1944 on the orders of Major-General Robert Laycock, the chief of Combined Operations Headquarters. He suggested that they were no longer as effective and only resulted in the Germans strengthening their beach defences, which could be detrimental to Allied plans.

== Commandos formation ==
The Commandos were formed after the British Expeditionary Force was evacuated from Dunkirk in 1940. Prime Minister Winston Churchill called for a force to be assembled and equipped to inflict casualties on the Germans and bolster British morale. Churchill told the joint Chiefs of Staff to propose measures for an offensive against German-occupied Europe, and stated, "they must be prepared with specially trained troops of the hunter class who can develop a reign of terror down the enemy coast."

One staff officer, Lieutenant Colonel Dudley Clarke, had already submitted such a proposal to General Sir John Dill, the Chief of the Imperial General Staff. Dill, aware of Churchill's intentions, approved Clarke's proposal. Three weeks later the first commando raid took place. The raiders failed to gather any intelligence or damage any German equipment; their only success was in killing two German sentries.

In 1940 the call went out for volunteers from among the serving Army soldiers within certain formations still in Britain, and men of the disbanding Divisional Independent Companies originally raised from Territorial Army Divisions who had seen service in Norway. (Note: The 10 independent companies were raised from volunteers in second-line Territorial Army divisions in April 1940. They were intended for guerrilla style operations in Norway following the German invasion. Each of the 10 companies initially consisted of 21 officers and 268 other ranks.) In November 1940 the new army units were organised into a Special Service Brigade under Brigadier J. C. Haydon, with four Special Service Battalions. By the autumn of 1940 more than 2,000 men had volunteered for commando training.

There were 19 British Army Commandos formed in the United Kingdom and the Middle East. The No. 10 (Inter-Allied) Commando was formed from volunteers from the occupied territories and enemy aliens. In February 1942 the Royal Marines were asked to organise commando units of their own; 6,000 men volunteered, forming nine commandos. In 1943 the Royal Naval Commandos and the Royal Air Force Commandos were formed from volunteers from the Royal Navy and the Royal Air Force.

Also in 1943, the commandos started to move away from smaller raiding operations. They were being formed into brigades of assault infantry to spearhead the future Allied landing operations. Of the remaining 20 Commandos, 17 were used in the formation of the four Special Service brigades. The three remaining units, No. 12, No. 14 and No. 62 Commandos, were left to carry out smaller-scale raids. A shortage of volunteers and the need to provide replacements for casualties forced the disbandment of these three commando units by the end of 1943. No. 10 (Inter-Allied) Commando was left for the task of small scale raiding. No. 10 was the largest commando and was formed from volunteers belonging to the occupied territories. It could now provide both parachute and canoe trained sub units.

The Commandos came under the operational control of the Combined Operations Headquarters. The man initially selected as the commander was Admiral of the Fleet Sir Roger Keyes, a veteran of the Gallipoli Campaign and the Zeebrugge Raid in World War I. Keyes resigned in October 1941 and was replaced by Admiral Louis Mountbatten. The final Commander of Combined Operations was Major General Robert Laycock, who took over from Mountbatten in October 1943.

== List ==
No.	Date	Codename	Unit	Numbers taking part	Location	Objective	Result
1	24/25 June 1940	Operation Collar	No. 11 Independent Company	200 men	Boulogne; Le Touquet; France	Reconnaissance and capture prisoners	The mission was only a propaganda victory; two Germans were killed for no loss and all the commandos returned safely.
2	14/15 July 1940	Operation Ambassador	No. 3 Commando; No. 11 Independent Company	140 men	Guernsey; Channel Islands	Capture prisoners attack airfield	Only 40 landed, the raid was a failure due to a series of mishaps, poor fortune and the haste with which it was planned and implemented. It resulted in no immediate military gains.
3	4 March 1941	Operation Claymore	No. 3 Commando; No. 4 Commando	800 men	Lofoten Islands; Norway	Destroy industry	About 800,000 gallons of fish oil, kerosene and paraffin were set on fire; the factories were destroyed and they captured 228 prisoners of war.
4	27/28 July 1941	Operation Chess	No. 12 Commando	16 men	Ambleteuse; France	Reconnaissance and capture prisoners	The Commandos remained ashore for one hour; no prisoners were taken and there were no casualties.
5	24 August– 2 September 1941	Operation Gauntlet	2nd Canadian Infantry Brigade	1,500 men	Spitsbergen; Norway	Destroy industry	Coal mining facilities were destroyed.
6	30/31 August 1941	Operation Acid Drop	No. 3 Commando	25 men	Neufchâtel-Hardelot; Merlimont; France	Reconnaissance and capture prisoners	The Commandos spent 30 minutes ashore but did not encounter any Germans.
7	27/28 September 1941	Operation Chopper	No. 1 Commando	25 men	St Aubin; France	Reconnaissance and capture prisoners	Two commandos were killed and had to be left behind.
8	27/28 September 1941	Operation Deep Cut	No. 1 Commando	25 men	St Vaast; France	Reconnaissance and capture prisoners	Commandos encountered and opened fire on a German Bicycle patrol; the Germans returned fire and wounded two men.
9	12/13 November 1941	Operation Astrakan	No. 6 Commando	4 men	Houlgate; France	Beach reconnaissance	The Commandos did not encounter any Germans, but did gather information on the suitability of the beach for use by Landing craft.
10	22/23 November 1941	Operation Sunstar	No. 9 Commando	100 men	Houlgate; France	Gun battery	A partial success, the operation encountered difficulties and did not succeed in destroying the battery or taking any prisoners; they did obtain documents and other information.
11	26–28 December 1941	Operation Anklet	No. 12 Commando	300 men	Florø; Norway	Capture prisoners and destroy radio stations	Two radio stations were destroyed and a number of ships sunk or captured and prisoners taken. Anklet is often mistaken as a diversionary raid for Archery, but it was the other way around.
12	27 December 1941	Operation Archery	No. 2 Commando; No. 3 Commando; No. 4 Commando; No. 6 Commando	800 men	Vågsøy; Norway	German shipping harbour installations and personnel	Four fish oil factories and stores were destroyed and German prisoners taken with a loss of 17 killed and 53 wounded.
13	17/18 January 1942	Operation Curlew	V Corps school of raiding (Note: Also known for security reasons as Department V Corps School, Warsash)	100 men	St Laurent; France	Reconnaissance of beach defences	The mission failed and the landing party had to be rescued by the navy.
14	27/28 February 1942	Operation Biting	2nd Parachute Battalion	120 men	Bruneval; France	Capture Radar equipment	This was a successful raid that led to the expansion of the British airborne forces and the creation of the Parachute Regiment.
15	27/28 March 1942	Operation Chariot	No. 2 Commando detachments from No's. 1, 3, 4, 5, 9 and 12 Commandos	600	Saint-Nazaire; France	Harbour installations	Chariot has since been called the greatest raid of all time. (Note: Out of 622 men who entered the St Nazaire harbour, 169 were killed, 215 became prisoners of war, and only 228 returned to England. To recognise their bravery a total of 89 decorations were awarded, including five Victoria Crosses. After the war St Nazaire was one of 38 battle honours awarded to the commandos.)
16	5 April 1942	Operation Myrmidon	No. 1 Commando; No. 6 Commando	100 men	Ardour Estuary; France	Harbour installations	The transport ships encountered a sandbar that they were unable to pass. That together with bad weather caused the raid to be called off.
17	11/12 April 1942	Operation JV	No. 6 Commando	2 men	Boulogne-sur-Mer; France	Shipping	The two men planted a limpet mine on a tanker and escaped unseen.
18	21/22 April 1942	Operation Abercrombie	No. 4 Commando; Detachment from the Carleton and York Regiment	150 men	Neufchâtel-Hardelot; France	Capture prisoners destroy searchlight battery	One commando was wounded but their objectives were not achieved.
19	3/4 June 1942	Operation Bristle	No. 6 Commando	unknown	St Cecile; France	German Radar site	The raid was a success but the transports were intercepted on the way home and casualties taken.
20	14/15 August 1942	Operation Barricade	No. 62 Commando (Note: No. 62 Commando was also known as the Small Scale Raiding Force.)	11 men	Pointe de Saire; France	Radar and anti-aircraft site	Three Germans were killed and six wounded without loss to the commandos, but their objective was not achieved.
21	19 August 1942	Operation Jubilee	2nd Canadian Infantry Division; No. 3 Commando; No. 4 Commando	10,500 men	Dieppe; France	Reconnaissance in force (Note: Operation Jubilee was the largest raid conducted, with 10,500 men taking part.)	The raid was a failure. The casualties included 3,367 Canadians and 275 British commandos. The Royal Navy lost one destroyer and 33 landing craft, suffering 550 dead and wounded. The RAF lost 106 aircraft to the Luftwaffe's 48. The German army had 591 casualties.
22	2/3 September 1942	Operation Dryad	No. 62 Commando	12 men	Le Casquets; Channel islands	Reconnaissance and capture prisoners	Seven prisoners were captured. Several codebooks were found and taken back for analysis.
23	7/8 September 1942	Operation Branford	No. 62 Commando	12 men	Burhou; Channel islands	Reconnaissance	The raid was to locate a suitable gun position to support an attack upon Alderney, and was uneventful.
24	12/13 September 1942	Operation Aquatint	No. 62 Commando	12 men	St Honerine; France	Reconnaissance and capture prisoners	All who landed were either killed or captured.
25	20/21 September 1942	Operation Musketoon	No. 12 Commando	12 men	Glomfjord; Norway	Industrial site	The raid was a success, but most of the commandos were captured trying to cross into Sweden. They became the first victims of the Commando Order.
26	3/4 October 1942	Operation Basalt	No. 12 Commando; No. 62 Commando	12 men	Sark; Channel islands	Reconnaissance and capture prisoners	Four Germans were killed and one taken prisoner. The prisoners had been bound and it resulted in Germany ordering 1,376 Allied POW's be manacled
27	11/12 November 1942	Operation Fahrenheit	No. 12 Commando; No. 62 Commando	10 men	Plouézec; France	Reconnaissance and capture prisoners	This was a raid on a signals station; after killing at least two Germans the commandos withdrew.
28	15/16 November 1942	Operation Batman	No. 12 Commando; No. 62 Commando	10 men	Cherbourg; France	Objective not known	The raid had to be cancelled, as they were unable to land in the high seas on the rocky shoreline.
29	19/20 November 1942	Operation Freshman	Royal Engineers	32 men	Telemark; Norway	Industrial site	All Royal Engineers involved were killed either when their gliders crashed on the way to their landing zone or survived the crash but were executed by the Germans.
30	22–29 November 1942	unknown	No. 10 (Inter-Allied) Commando	5 men	Bergen; Norway	Reconnaissance and capture prisoners	There were three attempts at this operation. The first one turned back after being spotted by German aircraft, the second did gather some intelligence from Norwegian fishermen before turning back and the third was abandoned due to bad weather.
31	11/12 December 1942	Operation Frankton	Royal Marines boom patrol detachment	12 men	Bordeaux; France	Shipping	Commandos successfully breached the harbour, but only two of the 12 involved survived. In 1955 the events of Frankton were made into the film The Cockleshell Heroes.
32	23/24 January 1943	Operation Cartoon	No. 10 (Inter-Allied) Commando; No. 12 Commando	63 men	Stord; Norway	Industrial site	The mission successfully destroyed a Pyrite mine.
33	24 February– 1 March 1943	Operation Crackers	No. 10 (Inter-Allied) Commando; No. 12 Commando; No. 30 Commando	16 men	Sognefjord; Norway	Capture prisoners	Bad weather stopped the raid but they set up an observation post which gathered much information.
34	27/28 January 1943	Operation Huckaback	No. 62 Commando	10 men	Herm; Channel islands	Capture prisoners and check Herm was suitable for artillery	Successful, the raiders did not find any signs of the German occupation, left propaganda leaflets
35	14/15 February 1943	Operation Brandy	No. 10 (Inter-Allied) Commando; No. 12 Commando	7 men	Florø; Norway	Shipping	The raid attacked two German ships and laid mines in the harbour. A Motor Torpedo Boat ran aground and had to be abandoned.
36	19 March 1943	Operation Roundabout	No. 10 (Inter-Allied) Commando; No. 12 Commando	10 men	Stad; Norway	Reconnaissance and capture prisoners	The raid was aborted after running into a German patrol.
37	3/4 April 1943	Operation Pussyfoot	No. 62 Commando	10 men	Herm; Channel islands	Capture prisoners	Failed to land due to thick fog
38	29 April 1943	Operation Checkmate	No. 14 (Arctic) Commando	7 men	Haugesund; Norway	Shipping	The raiders successfully planted mines, but all the commandos involved were captured and executed.
39	3/4 July 1943	Operation Forfar Easy	No. 12 Commando	10 men	Onival; France	Reconnaissance and capture prisoners	They managed to scale the cliffs but were unable to breach the barbed wire on top.
40	5/6 July 1943	Operation Forfar Dog	No. 12 Commando	10 men	Biville; France	Reconnaissance and capture prisoners	The Motor Torpedo Boat came under fire as the commandos were put ashore.
41	3–5 August 1943	Operation Forfar Beer	No. 12 Commando	10 men	Életot; France	Reconnaissance and capture prisoners	The Commando's transport ships were discovered en route by German patrol ship.
42	3/4 August 1943	Operation Forfar Love	Special Boat Section	4 men	Dunkirk; France	Reconnaissance of pier	The two canoes were forced to withdraw when picked up by searchlight.
43	1–4 September 1943	Operation Forfar	No. 10 (Inter-Allied) Commando; No. 12 Commando	8 men	St Valery; France	Reconnaissance of searchlight battery and capture prisoners	The raid was a partial success. The team was successfully parachuted in but their ship was swamped when leaving, with the loss of all equipment.
44	3/4 September 1943	Operation Pound	No. 12 Commando	unknown	Ushant; France	Reconnaissance and capture prisoners	Two Germans were believed to have been killed but they were unable to identify their unit.
45	24/25 December 1943	Operation Hardtack 11	No. 10 (Inter-Allied) Commando	7 men	Gravelines; France	Reconnaissance and capture prisoners	The Motor Torpedo Boat transporting them diverted to attack a convoy and their dory sank with the death of one man. The other six reached the shore and joined the French Resistance.
46	25/26 December 1943	Operation Hardtack 13	No. 10 (Inter-Allied) Commando; Special Boat Squadron	10 men	Bénouville; France	Reconnaissance and capture prisoners	The raid was a successful reconnaissance but they did not capture any prisoners.
47	25/26 December 1943	Operation Hardtack 28	No. 10 (Inter-Allied) Commando	10 men	Jersey; Channel islands	Capture prisoners	After climbing the cliffs the commandos spoke to some locals, but running out of time, returning a mine was set off wounding two men. All men evacuated.
48	26/27 December 1943	Operation Hardtack 4	No. 10 (Inter-Allied) Commando	10 men	Biville-sur-Mer; France	Reconnaissance and capture prisoners	The Commandos were forced to withdraw by German patrol activity.
49	26/27 December 1943	Operation Hardtack 5	No. 10 (Inter-Allied) Commando	10 men	Onival; France	Reconnaissance and capture prisoners	One commando was injured by an anti-personnel mine on landing; the rest spend four and a half hours ashore but did not see any Germans, just unoccupied strong points.
50	26/27 December 1943	Operation Hardtack 7	No. 10 (Inter-Allied) Commando; No. 12 Commando	5 men	Sark; Channel Islands	Reconnaissance and capture prisoners	On the first attempt the commandos had to return to England when they were unable to scale the cliffs from where they landed, the second attempt on 27/28 December was abandoned when the commandos entered a minefield with two men killed and most others wounded.
51	26/27 December 1943	Operation Hardtack 21	No. 10 (Inter-Allied) Commando	10 men	Quinéville; France	Reconnaissance and capture prisoners	The raid gathered information on the defensive obstacles on what would become Utah Beach.
52	27/28 December 1943	Operation Hardtack 23	No. 10 (Inter-Allied) Commando	10 men	Ostend; Belgium	Reconnaissance and capture prisoners	The raid was called off after their Motor Torpedo Boat transport ran aground.
53	24/25 December 1943	Operation Hardtack 36	No. 10 (Inter-Allied) Commando	10 men	Wassenaar; Netherlands	Reconnaissance and capture prisoners	All the commandos involved were killed after landing.
54	15/16 May 1944	Operation Tarbrush 5	No. 10 (Inter-Allied) Commando	2 men	Dunkirk; France	Beach reconnaissance	The raid was a successful examination of beach obstacles.
55	15/16 May 1944	Operation Tarbrush 8	No. 10 (Inter-Allied) Commando	2 men	Quend; France	Beach reconnaissance	The raid was a successful examination of beach obstacles; a teller mine was brought back for examination.
56	16/17 May 1944	Operation Tarbrush 3	No. 10 (Inter-Allied) Commando	2 men	Bray-Dunes; France	Beach reconnaissance	The Commandos were unable to land in rough seas.
57	17/18 May 1944	Operation Tarbrush 10	No. 10 (Inter-Allied) Commando	2 men	Onival; France	Beach reconnaissance	A navigation error meant the commandos were landed in the wrong place and captured.
58	24/25 August 1944	Operation Rumford	No. 10 (Inter-Allied) Commando	10 men	Île d'Yeu; France	Capture German held island	This was a successful landing, but the Germans had already evacuated the island.

== Gallery ==
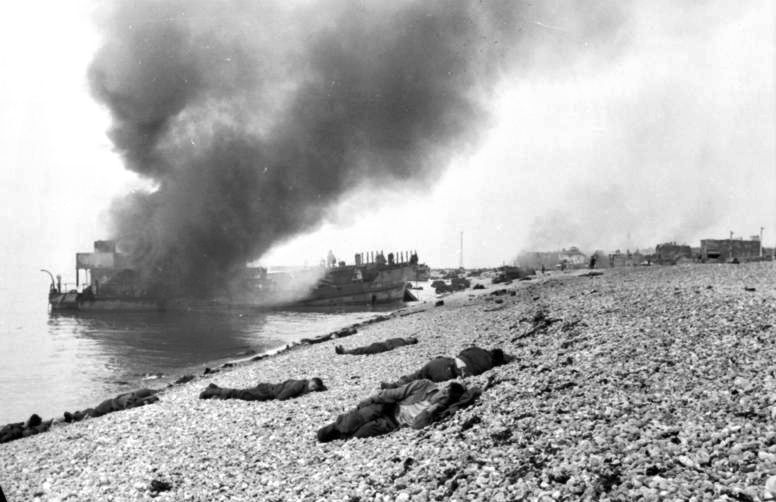
Operation Jubilee destroyed Landing craft on fire with Canadian dead on the beach

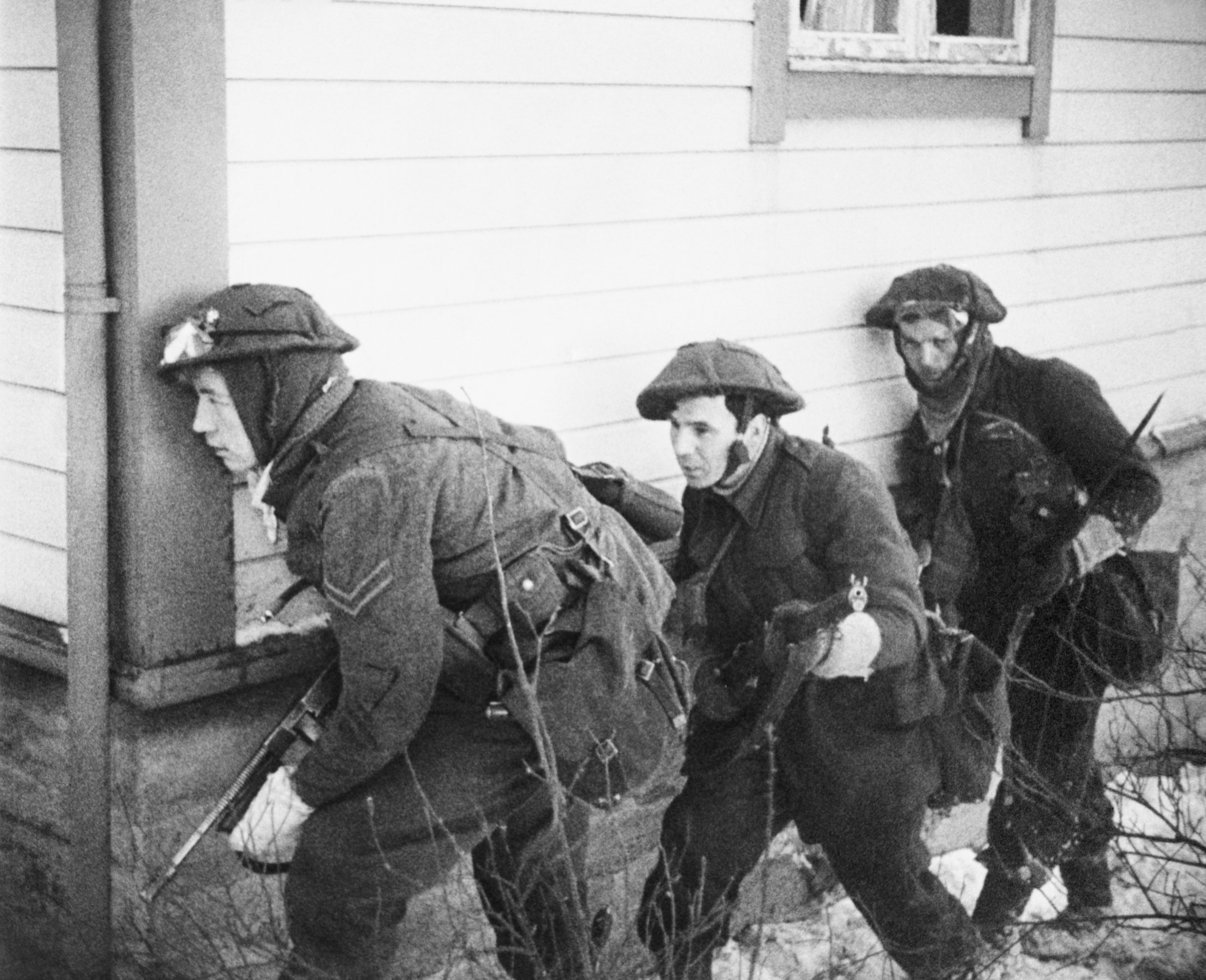
British Commandos during Operation Archery

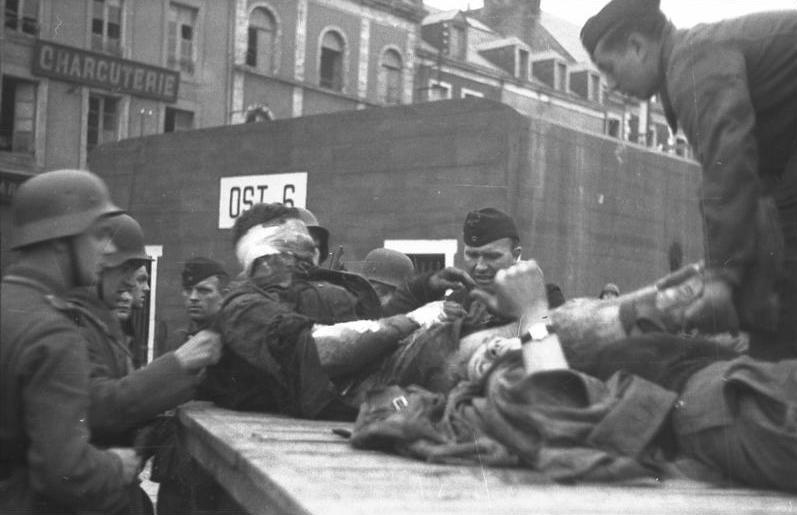
Wounded commandos after Operation Chariot

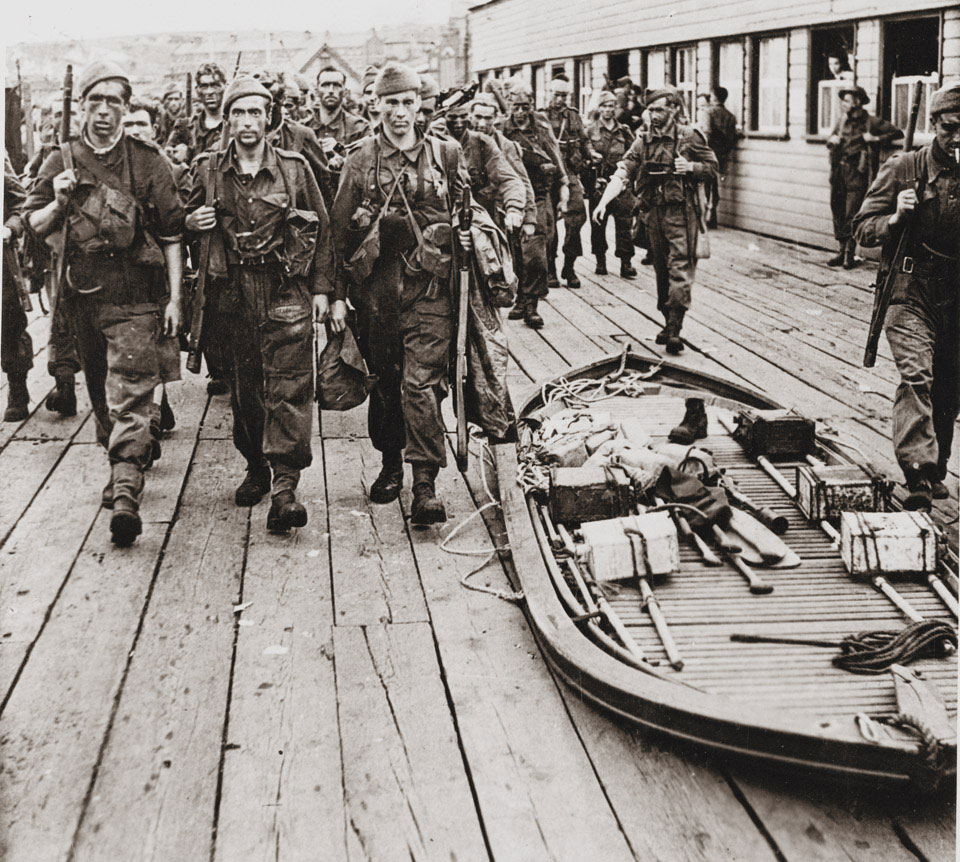
Commandos marching away from a quayside. A collapsible Goatley boat is to their right.

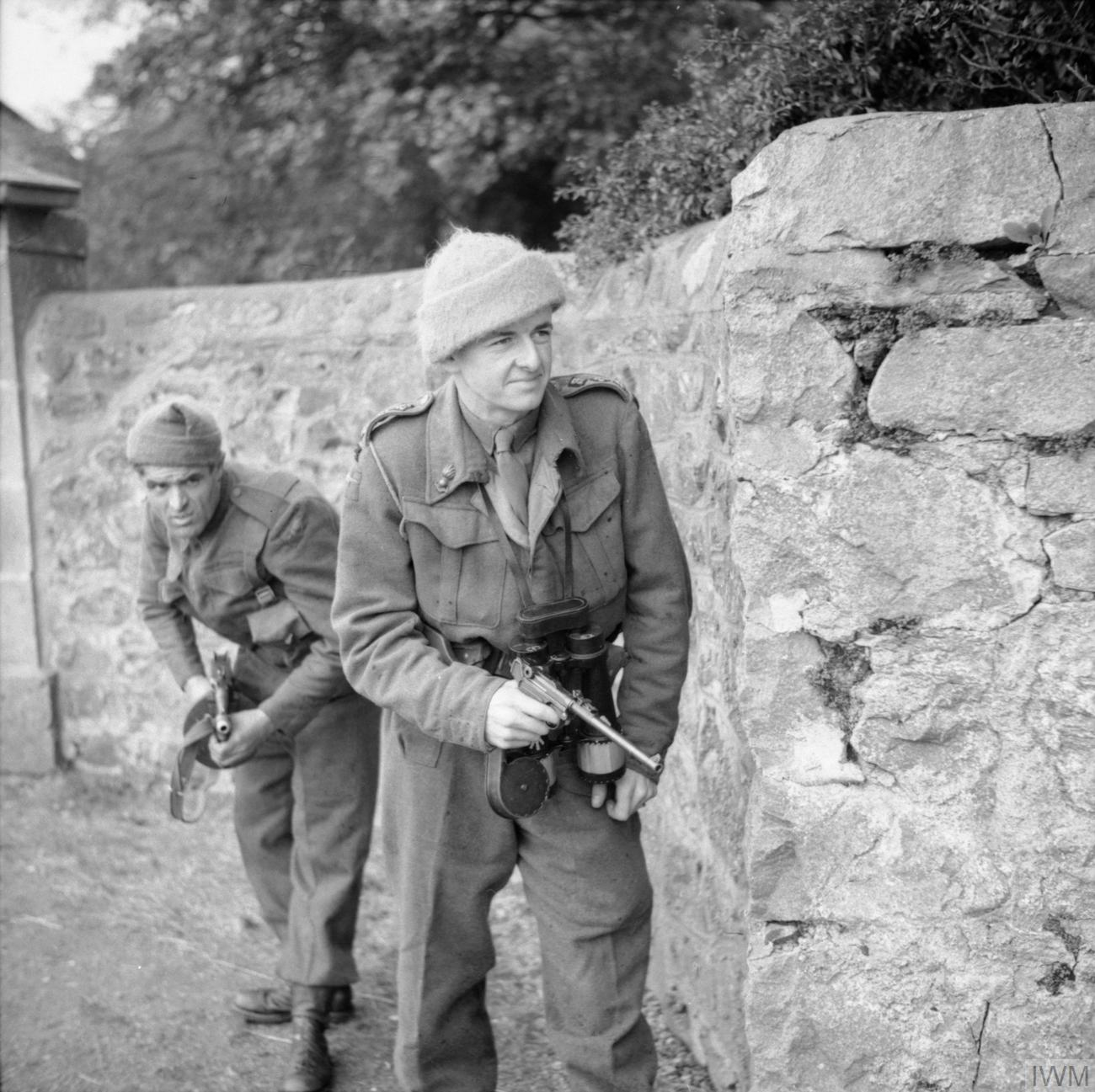
Two men of 101 (Folbot) Troop, No. 6 Commando training

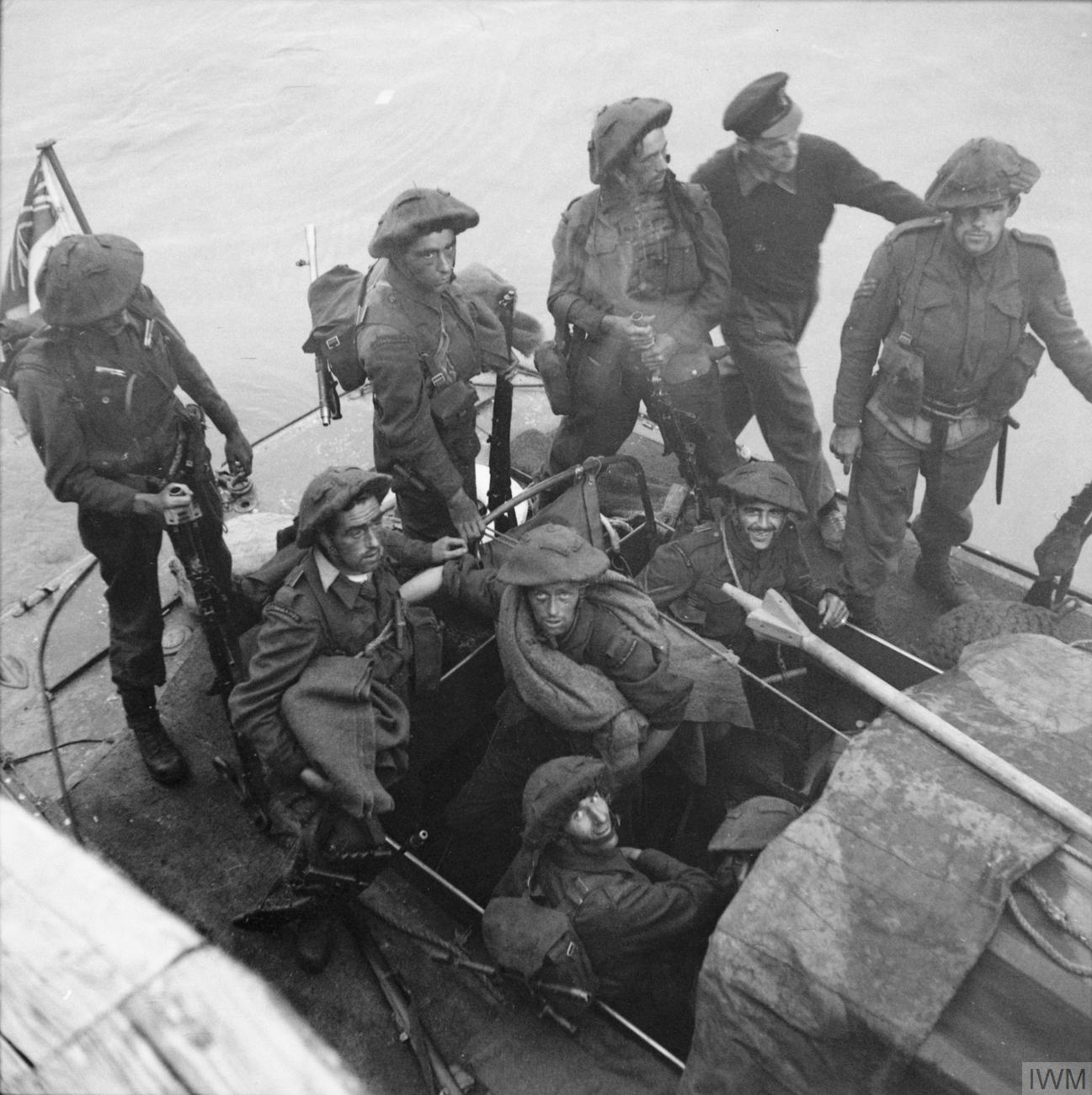
Men of No. 3 Commando after Operation Jubilee

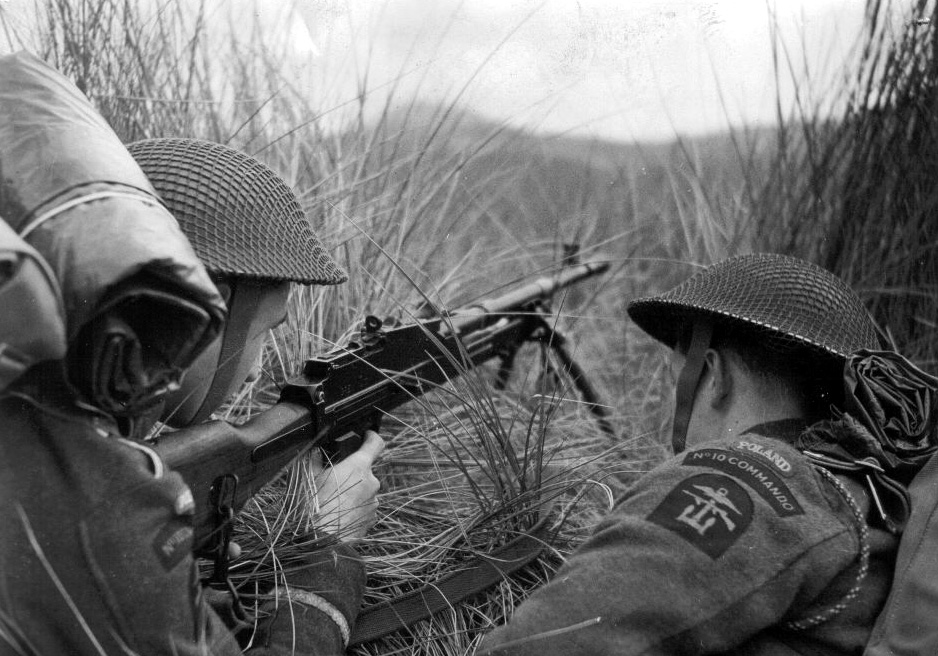
Poles of No. 10 (Inter-Allied) Commando during training in Scotland

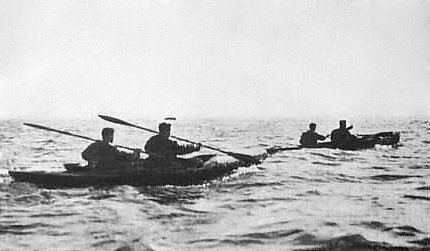
The two man canoe used in operations J V, Astrakan and Frankton

== Notes ==
Footnotes

Citations
