= List of military operations in the West European Theater during World War II by year =

== Western Front ==
Includes land and sea operations relating to north-west Europe, but excludes:

- purely naval operations in the adjoining waters (see: List of World War II military operations - Atlantic Ocean)
- operations in Scandinavia (Denmark, Finland, Norway and Sweden), Iceland and Greenland (see: Military operations in Scandinavia and Iceland during World War II)
- operations in the Mediterranean and Italy (see: World War II operations in the Mediterranean region).

=== 1935–1938 ===
- Fall Rot ("Case Red") (1935) (Nazi Germany) — overview of defense planning in tandem with Fall Blau. Rot covered defence in the west in the event of military action in the east (Fall Blau).
- Fall Blau ("Case Blue") (1935) (Nazi Germany) — overview of defense planning in tandem with Fall Rot.
- Fall Otto ("Case Otto") (1937) (Nazi Germany) — plan to occupy Austria.
- Fall Richard ("Case Richard") (1937) (Nazi Germany) — Contingency planning for Soviet/communist takeover in Spain.
- Fall Grün ("Case Green") (1938) (Nazi Germany) — plan for invasion of Czechoslovakia.

=== 1939 ===
- Fall Weiss ("Case White") (1939) (Nazi Germany) — invasion of Poland

=== 1940 ===
- Aerial (1940) (United Kingdom) (Canada) — Allied retreat from France using ports between Cherbourg and the Spanish frontier.
- Ambassador (1940) (United Kingdom) — commando raid on Guernsey
- Attila (1940) (Nazi Germany) — German seizure and occupation of Vichy France, without Italian support. See also Fall Anton ("Case Anton") and Lila.
- Cycle (1940) (United Kingdom) (Canada) (France) (Poland) — British and Allied evacuation from Le Havre
- Dynamo (1940) (United Kingdom) (Canada) (France) — British & Allied evacuation from Dunkirk.
- Fall Gelb ("Case Yellow") (1939–40) (Nazi Germany) — offensive against the Netherlands, Belgium and Luxembourg.
- Fall Rot ("Case Red") (1939–40) (Nazi Germany) — an invasion of France and rout of British Expeditionary Force
- Grünpfeil (Green Arrow) (1940) (Nazi Germany) — invasion of British held Channel Islands (1940)
- Granit (Granite) (1940) (Nazi Germany) — Fallschirmjäger capture of Fort Eben-Emael in Belgium
- Mondscheinsonate ("Moonlight Sonata") (1940) (Nazi Germany) — Luftwaffe raid on Coventry
- Royal Marine (1940) (United Kingdom) — Dropping of naval mines into the Rhine (originally Operation Marine)
- Seelöwe ("Sealion") (1940) (Nazi Germany) — planned invasion of Britain
  - Adlerangriff ("Eagle Attack") (Nazi Germany) (Italy) — Axis effort to destroy the RAF prior to invasion. Preceded by attacks on shipping known as "Kanalkampf" (Channel Battle). Aerial battles during the period were later dubbed the Battle of Britain.
  - Fall Grün ("Case Green") (1940) (Nazi Germany) — planned invasion of Ireland as part of Seelöwe
  - Herbstreise ("Autumn Journey") (Nazi Germany) — planned/diversionary invasion of Scotland as part of Seelöwe.
- Tannenbaum ("Christmas Tree") (1940) (Nazi Germany) — planned invasion of Switzerland.
- XD (1940) (United Kingdom) — a series of demolition operations to prevent the capture of oil installations and stocks by the Germans

=== 1941 ===
- Chess (1941) (United Kingdom) — commando raid on Ambleteuse, Pas-de-Calais, France
- Colossus (1941) (United Kingdom) — Feb. 10, commando raid on Tragino aqueduct near Calitri, Italy.

=== 1942 ===
- Aflame (1942) (United Kingdom) — commando raid on Berck in France
- Aquatint (1942) (United Kingdom) — commando raid on Normandy in France
- Barricade (1942) (United Kingdom) — commando raid on Pointe de Saire south of Barfleur in France
- Basalt (1942) (United Kingdom) — commando raid on Sark in the Channel Islands
- Batman (1942) (United Kingdom) — commando raid near Cherbourg in France
- Biting (1942) (United Kingdom) — commando raid on Bruneval radar site in France
- Bolero (1942) (United States) — build-up of US forces and matériel for Roundup. Later utilized during Torch and Overlord.
- Branford (1942) (United Kingdom) — commando raid on Burhou in the Channel Islands
- Zerberus (Nazi Germany) — ("Cerberus") (1942) — break-out of German capital ships from Brest later dubbed the "Channel Dash".
- Chariot (1942) (United Kingdom) — British raid on Saint Nazaire.
- Dryad (1942) (United Kingdom) — commando raid on Casquets lighthouse in the Channel Islands
- Fahrenheit (1942) (United Kingdom) — commando raid at Pointe de Plouezec on the north Brittany coast
- Fall Anton (1942) (Nazi Germany) (Italy) — German occupation of Vichy France: Attila renamed, with Italian support.
- Frankton (1942) (United Kingdom) — commando raid on shipping in Bordeaux.
- Jubilee (1942) (United Kingdom) (Canada) — repelled raid on Dieppe. See Also Operation Rutter.
  - Abercrombie (1942) (Canada) — raid on Hardelot in preparation for Jubilee.
  - Cauldron (1942) (United Kingdom) — raid on Varengeville in support of Jubilee.
- Lila (1942) (Nazi Germany) — plan to capture French fleet at Toulon.
- Millennium (1942) (United Kingdom) — British 1000 bomber raid on Cologne.
- Outward (1942–44) (United Kingdom) ; free balloon attacks on Germany.
- Roundup (1942) (United States) — plan to invade Europe in the event of German or Soviet collapse. Later abandoned in favour of Torch landings. Planning for Roundup included;
  - Sledgehammer (1942) — establishment of beachhead in Cherbourg or Brest.
  - Roundhammer — revised planning for Roundup.
- Sickle (1942) (United States) — build-up of US air forces in UK
- Torch (1942 (United States) (United Kingdom) — Allied invasion of North Africa.
- Plan W (1942) (Republic of Ireland) (United Kingdom) — planning between Allies and neutral Éire (Ireland) to deal with Fall Grün.

=== 1943 ===
- Bellicose (1943) (United Kingdom) — British bombing mission against Friedrichshafen and La Spezia.
- Bolero (1943/1944) (United States) (United Kingdom) — build-up of US forces and matériel in preparation for Allied invasion of France.
- Chastise (1943) (United Kingdom) — the bombing of Ruhr area dams popularly known as the "Dambusters" raid.
- Corona (1943) (United Kingdom) — bombing raid on Kassel, Germany.
- Constellation (1943) (United Kingdom) — one of several proposals to retake the Channel Islands;
  - Condor (1943) (United Kingdom) — proposal to retake Jersey
  - Concertina (1943) (United Kingdom) — proposal to retake Alderney
  - Coverlet (1943) (United Kingdom) — proposal to retake Guernsey
- Crossbow (1943–1944) (United Kingdom) — plan to destroy rocket production and launch sites. See Also Pointblank.
  - Hydra (1943) (United Kingdom) — bombing of Peenemünde rocket research center.
- Double Strike (1943) (United States) — bombing of Regensburg and Schweinfurt.
- Huckaback (1943) (United Kingdom) — commando raid on Herm in the Channel Islands
- Husky (1943 (United States) (United Kingdom) — Allied invasion of Sicily.
- Project Habakkuk (1943) (United Kingdom) — project to construct an aircraft carrier from pykrete.
- Pointblank (1943) (United States) (United Kingdom) — umbrella for bombing offensive by USAAF and RAF in preparation for Overlord.
  - Gomorrah (1943) (United Kingdom) — sequence of air raids on Hamburg.
- Rankin (1943) (United Kingdom) — planned liberation of the Channel Islands

=== 1944 ===
- Abel (1944) (Free France) — harassment of German retreat in France.
- Astonia (1944) (Canada) (United Kingdom) — assault on Le Havre
- Axehead (1944) (Canada) — proposed assault crossing of the lower Seine and capture of Le Havre and Rouen (superseded by Astonia)
- Benson (1944) (Belgium) — reconnaissance mission by Belgian SAS near Amiens
- Bergbang (1944) (Belgium) — unsuccessful mission by Belgian SAS east of River Meuse
- Brutus (1944) (Belgium) — mission by Belgian SAS in Ardennes to arm local resistance and reinforce SAS forces
- Bulbasket (1944) (United Kingdom) — SAS operation to prevent German reinforcements moving from southern France to Normandy
- Bunyan (1944) (Belgium) — disruption mission by Belgian SAS in Chartres area
- Caliban (1944) (Belgium) — mission by Belgian SAS near Leopoldsburg to disrupt German communications
- Chaucer (1944) (Belgium) — Belgian SAS operation near Le Mans to harry German retreat
- Clipper (1944) (United States) (United Kingdom) — Allied assault on Siegfried Line at Geilenkirchen.
- Constellation (1944) (United Kingdom) — occupation of Venray and Venlo by British VIII Corps.
  - Aintree (1944) (United Kingdom) — occupation of Overloon and Venray by British 3rd Infantry Division.
- Cooney (1944) (France) — French SAS operation in Brittany to cut railway lines
- Derry (1944) (United Kingdom) — SAS operation near Le Mans to disrupt German retreat to Brest
- Diver (1944) (United Kingdom) — Defence of London against V-1 attack.
- Fabian (1944) (Belgium) — Belgian SAS reconnaissance operation around Arnhem (also involved in the recovery of British paratroops after Operation Market Garden)
- Franklin (1944) (France) — French SAS operation in the Ardennes in support of the US VIII Corps
- Fusilade (1944) (Canada) — capture of Dieppe
- Gaff (1944) (United Kingdom) — SAS operation near Rambouillet to kill or capture Field Marshal Erwin Rommel, but which instead destroyed trains and attacked a German headquarters
- Gain (1944) (United Kingdom) — SAS successful SAS operation southwest of Paris to disrupt enemy communications
- Gatwick (1944) — precursor of Operation Veritable
- Gobbo (1944) (Belgium) — Belgian SAS intelligence gathering operation in northern Holland, near Drente
- Guildford (United Kingdom) — 15th (Scottish) Infantry Division capture of Blerick
- Haft (1944) (United Kingdom) — Special Air Service (SAS) intelligence gathering mission near Le Mans.
- Haggard (1944) (United Kingdom) (Belgium) — SAS operation near Bourges
- Hardy (1944) — SAS information gathering operation near Dijon
- Harrod (1944) (France) — French SAS operation in the Saone et Loire in support of the US 3rd Army
- Houndsmith (1944) (United Kingdom) — Special Air Service (SAS) action near Dijon.
- Houndsworth (1944) (United Kingdom) (Free France) — Special Air Service (SAS) campaign in and around Morvan.
- Hurricane (1944) (United States) (United Kingdom) — Bombing of Ruhr. See Also Chastise.
- Independence (1944) (France) (United States) — clearance of German garrisons on the Gironde estuary (postponed, later revived as Operation Venerable)
- Infatuate (1944) (United Kingdom) (Canada) capture of Walcheren Island — final phase of the Battle of the Scheldt.
- Jedburgh (1944) (United Kingdom) (United States) (Free France) — Airdrop of operatives into France, Belgium and the Netherlands to conduct sabotage and guerrilla warfare, and to lead the local resistance forces in actions against the Germans.
- Jericho (1944) (United Kingdom) — air-raid on Amiens prison to release French Resistance prisoners
- Jockworth (1944) (France) — French SAS operation near Lyon to impede German movements and bolster local Resistance; became active in the fighting in Lyon
- Kipling (1944) (United Kingdom) — British SAS action near Auxerre to aid Allied airborne landings in Orleans Gap; these were cancelled and the SAS harassed the enemy in support of allied ground advance
- Loyton (1944) (United Kingdom) — unsuccessful large SAS action in Vosges mountains.
- Lüttich (1944) (Nazi Germany) — German counter-offensive at Mortain.
- Mallard (Maas) (United Kingdom) — British XII Corps' advance to the Maas
- Marine (1944) (United Kingdom) — Dropping of naval mines into the Rhine
- Market Garden (1944) (United Kingdom) (United States) (Poland) — Allied land and airborne attempt to cross the lower Rhine.
  - Comet (1944) (United Kingdom) — early draft of Market Garden
  - Berlin (1944) (United Kingdom) (Poland) — withdrawal of British 1st Airborne.
- Marshall (1944) (Free France) — French SAS mission to harass the enemy and stiffen local resistance around Correze
- Moses (1944) (Free France) — Free French SAS action around Poitiers
- Newton (1944) (Free France) — Free French SAS action in Burgundy, France
- Noah (1944) (United Kingdom) — response to blowing of river dykes near Nijmegen and consequential flooding
- Nutcracker (United Kingdom) — British VIII Corps' advance to the Maas
- Olive (1944) (Canada) (United Kingdom) (United States) — offensive against the Gothic Line.
- Overlord (1944) (United States) (United Kingdom) (Canada) (Free France) — invasion of Normandy, France. See also Pointblank.
  - Aberlour (1944) (United Kingdom) — cancelled follow-up to Mitten.
  - Astonia (1944) (United Kingdom) (Canada) — assault on Le Havre
  - Bluecoat (1944) (United Kingdom) — Launched to support Operation Cobra
  - Bodyguard — deception plan, including:
    - Fortitude (1944) —
      - Skye
    - Fortitude (1944) — two deception operations to mislead over the location of landings
    - Glimmer (1944) — feint towards Pas-de-Calais
    - Hambone (1944) — also known as Copperhead
    - Jael
    - Quicksilver
    - Zeppelin (1944) (United Kingdom) — deception plan to depict an amphibious landing on Crete, western Greece, or the Romanian Black Sea coast
  - Charnwood (1944) (United Kingdom) (Canada) — assault on Caen.
  - Chastity (1944) (United States) — seize over Brittany.
  - Chicago (United States) — Allied airdrop
  - Cobra (1944) (United States) — breakout from Normandy.
    - Dunhill (1944) (United Kingdom) — SAS reconnaissance action in support of Cobra.
  - Cooney (1944) (Free France) — Free French SAS action in St Malo area.
  - Dauntless (1944) (United Kingdom) — See Operation Martlet
  - Defoe (1944) (United Kingdom) — ineffective SAS reconnaissance around Argentan in Normandy
  - Detroit (1944) (United States) — American airdrop in Normandy
  - Dingson (1944) (Free France) — Free French SAS operation around Vannes to disrupt communications and arm local Resistance
    - Lost (1944) (Free France) — French SAS team in Brittany to link with Dingson
  - Epsom (1944) (United Kingdom) — British assault west of Caen, Normandy, aimed at capturing the city
    - Martlet (1944) (United Kingdom) — Supporting operation launched the day before Operation Epsom
  - Goodwood (1944) (United Kingdom) — British armoured assault to capture the Bourguébus Ridge, destroy German armoured reserves and support Operation Atlantic
    - Atlantic (1944) (Canada) — Operation to capture the remaining sections of the German-occupied city of Caen. Launched side by side with Operation Goodwood
    - Greenline (1944) (United Kingdom) — diversionary attack by XII Corps designed to draw German attention away from the upcoming assault, out of the Orne bridgehead, codenamed Goodwood.
    - Pomegranate (1944) (United Kingdom) — diversionary attack by XXX Corps designed to draw German attention away from the upcoming assault, out of the Orne bridgehead, codenamed Goodwood.
  - Hands Up (1944) (United Kingdom) — Allied seize towards Quiberon Bay.
  - Grouse (1944) (United Kingdom) — advance towards Tinchebray (also called Wallop).
  - Jupiter (United Kingdom) — British attack to occupy and hold Hill 112, near Caen
  - Kitten (1944) (United Kingdom) (Canada) — British and Canadian advance to the Seine.
  - Mulberry (1944) — the creation of safe anchorages using block ships
  - Mitten (1944) (United Kingdom) — elimination of German position at Chateau de la Ronde
  - Neptune — landing phase of Overlord
    - Accumulator (1944) (Canada) — diversionary naval operation near to the Channel Islands
    - Bravado (1944) (United Kingdom) — mine-laying around Kiel Canal to inhibit German naval reaction
    - Gambit (1944) (United Kingdom) — use of X-Craft midget submarines as navigation beacons off Sword and Juno beaches
    - Maple (United Kingdom) — Allied naval minelaying operations to inhibit German naval reaction
  - Neptune (Seine) (United Kingdom) — 43rd (Wessex) Division's assault crossing of Seine
  - Paddle (1944) (Canada) — Canadian pursuit of German forces
  - Peppermint (1944) (United States) — Precautions against German spreading of radioactive poison materials
  - Pirate (1944) (Canada) (United Kingdom) — Anglo-Canadian training exercise prior to D-Day, at Studland Bay, England
  - Pluto (1944) (United Kingdom) — construction of undersea oil pipelines between England and France
  - Postage Able (1944) (United Kingdom) — landing beach surveys using X-Craft and divers
  - Samwest (1944) (Free France) — large raid conducted by 116 Free French paratroops of the 4th Special Air Service Regiment.
  - Smash (1944) (United Kingdom) — British training exercise prior to D-Day, at Studland Bay, Dorset, England
  - Spring (Canada) — Canadian attack on high ground, south of Caen
  - Sussex (Free France) — insertion of French OSS operatives into France to report German troop movements
  - Tiger (1944) (United States) — Allied training exercise prior to D-Day, near Slapton, England
  - Tonga (United Kingdom) — British airdrop in Normandy, east of the Orne River
    - Mallard (Airdrop) (United Kingdom) — British air landing follow-up to Tonga
  - Totalize (1944) (Poland) (Canada) (United Kingdom) — Allied advance to capture high ground north of the city of Falaise
  - Tractable (1944) (Poland) (Canada) — Attack to capture the city of Falaise, and to help close the Falaise pocket
  - Trousers (1944) (Canada) (United Kingdom) — Anglo-Canadian training exercise prior to D-Day, near Slapton, England
  - Walter (1944) (United Kingdom) — tidy-up operation, using two brigades.
  - Wallace and Hardy (1944) (United Kingdom) — prevent German reinforcements moving to the Normandy beachheads.
  - Wallop (1944) (United Kingdom) — advance towards Tinchebray (also called Grouse).
  - Windsor (1944) (Canada) — capture of Carpiquet.
- Dickens (1944) (France) — highly successful French SAS operation around Nantes to disrupt rail lines, gather intelligence and support local Resistance
- Pegasus (1944) — Allied rescue of troops after the failure of Market Garden
- Queen (1944) — aerial close-support operation in Hurtgen Forest, east of Aachen
- Switchback (1944) (Canada) taking of Breskens pocket, first phase of the Battle of the Scheldt.
- Thunderbolt (1944) (United States) , the battle for Fort Driant, near Metz
- Totter (1944) (United Kingdom) combined ROC and RAF anti V-1 efforts
- Undergo (1944) (Canada) (United Kingdom) — assault on Calais
- Vitality (1944) (Canada) taking of South Beveland, second phase of the Battle of the Scheldt.
- Wacht am Rhein ("Watch on the Rhine") (1944) (Nazi Germany) — counteroffensive in the Ardennes
  - Greif ("Griffin") (1944) (Nazi Germany) — infiltration using troops disguised in Allied uniforms.
  - Stösser (1944) (Nazi Germany) — airborne drop in support of the Wacht am Rhein.
  - Bodenplatte ("Baseplate") (1944) (Nazi Germany) — Luftwaffe support raids on Allied airbases. Rescheduled to 1 January 1945.
- Wellhit (1944) (Canada) (United Kingdom) — assault on Boulogne

=== 1945 ===
- Amherst (1945) (France) — French airborne SAS raid in north-east Netherlands
- Anger (1945) (United Kingdom) — cross the Neder Rijn and capture Arnhem
- Barker (1944) (France) — French SAS operation to protect exposed right flank of US 3rd Army
- Blackcock (1945) (United Kingdom) — clearance of the Roer Triangle by the British 2nd Army
- Bremen (1945) (United Kingdom) — occupation of Bremen
- Cannonshot (1945) (Canada) — crossing the IJssel
- Cleanser (1945) (Canada) — advance to the IJsselmeer
- Crosskeys (1945) (United Kingdom) — the establishment of allied coastal and minesweeping forces in Danish waters
- Destroyer (1945) (Canada) — clearing the "Island"
- Eclipse (1945) (United Kingdom) (United States) — occupation of north German ports
- Exodus (1945) (United Kingdom) — repatriation of POWs
- Goldflake (1945) (Canada) — Canadian 1st Corps moves from Italy to northwest Europe under command of Canadian First Army
- Grenade (1945) (United States) — US Ninth Army advance from the Roer (see also Veritable)
- Howard (1945) (United Kingdom) — Special Air Service reconnaissance operation ahead of Canadian 4th Armoured Division advance towards Oldenburg
- Keystone (1945) (United Kingdom) — Special Air Service mission to capture bridges over Apeldoorn canal and harass the enemy south of IJsselmeer
- Larkswood (1945) (Belgium) — Belgian SAS reconnaissance operation ahead of Canadian and Polish units in Holland and Germany
- Manna and Chowhound (United Kingdom) (United States) — Food droppings in Holland to relieve the Dutch famine.
- Nestegg (1945) (United Kingdom) — reoccupation of the Channel Islands
- Nordwind ("North Wind") (1945) (Nazi Germany) — attempt to open a second front in Alsace
- Placket (1945) (United Kingdom) — delivery by sea of essential supplies to Dutch civilians
- Plunder (1945) (United Kingdom) (United States) (Canada) — 21st Army Group crossing of the Rhine
  - Archway (1945) (United Kingdom) — SAS operation to support Plunder and the subsequent advance to Kiel
  - Flashpoint (United States) — Ninth US Army element of Plunder
  - Torchlight (United Kingdom) – British XII Corps element of Plunder
  - Turnscrew (United Kingdom) (Canada) – British XXX Corps element of Plunder
    - Widgeon (United Kingdom) – British 1st Commando Brigade element of Plunder
  - Varsity (United Kingdom) (Canada) (United States) — airborne element of Plunder
- Schneeman (1945) (Nazi Germany) — German attempt to open a second front in Netherlands.
- Valediction (1945) (Canada) (United Kingdom) — original plan for Canadian First Army's advance through the Klever Reichswald to Xanten, delayed then renamed Veritable
- Venerable (1945) (France) (United States) — clearance of German garrisons on the Gironde estuary (Operation Independence, revived)
  - Jupiter (1945) (France) — assault on Île d'Oléron
- Veritable (1945) (Canada) (United Kingdom) — Canadian First Army's advance through the Klever Reichswald to Xanten co-ordinated with Grenade (formerly Valediction)
  - Blockbuster (1945) (Canada) (United Kingdom) — final phases of Veritable
  - Heather (1945) (United Kingdom) — reinforcement of XXX Corps by British 3rd Infantry Division
  - Ventilate (1945) (United Kingdom) — cancelled assault crossing of the Meuse (Maas) by British 3rd Infantry Division

== See also ==
List of World War II military operations
