= List of military operations in the Nordic countries during World War II =

The following is a list of military operations conducted in Denmark, Finland, Iceland, Norway, and Sweden during World War II.

== Axis ==
- Birke ("Birch") (1944) — German plan to withdraw from northern Finland prior to the Lapland War
- Birkhahn (1945) — German evacuation from Norway.
- Büffel ("Buffalo") (1940) — German operation to relieve troops in Narvik, Norway
- Hokki ("Calk") (1944) (Finland) — Finnish plan to destroy railroad tracks to deny the Soviets their supplies.
- Holzauge ("Wood knot") (1942) — activities in Greenland
- Ikarus (1940) — planned German invasion of Iceland in response to British Operation Fork
- Juno (1940) — German naval operation to disturb allied supplies to Norway
- Kilpapurjehdus ("Regatta") (1941) (Finland) — Finnish naval operation for the militarization of the Åland islands.
- Lachsfang (1942) — Proposed combined German and Finnish attack against Kandalaksha and Belomorsk
- Nordlicht 2 ("Aurora Borealis") (1944) — German withdrawal from the Kola Peninsula into Norway
- Silberfuchs ("Silver Fox") (1941) — German and Finnish operations in the Arctic, including:
  - Blaufuchs 1 ("Blue Fox 1") (1941) — Staging of German forces from Germany to northern Finland
  - Blaufuchs 2 ("Blue Fox 2") (1941) — Staging of German forces from Norway to northern Finland
  - Platinfuchs ("Platinum Fox") (1941) — Joint German-Finnish attack towards Murmansk from Finnish Petsamo
  - Polarfuchs ("Polar Fox") (1941) — Joint German-Finnish attack towards Kandalaksha from Finnish Lapland
  - Renntier ("Reindeer") (1941) — German occupation of Petsamo
- Safari (1943) — German operation to capture and disarm Danish forces
- Sizilien (1943) — German raid upon Allied-occupied Spitzbergen (Svalbard)
- Tanne Ost (1944) — failed German attempt to capture Suursaari from Finland
- Tanne West (1944) — planned German attempt to capture the Åland from Finland
- Weserübung ("Weser Exercise") (1940) — German invasion of Denmark and Norway
  - Weserübung Nord ("Weser Exercise") (1940) — German invasion of Trondheim and Narvik
  - Weserübung Sud ("Weser Exercise") (1940) — German invasion of Bergen, Kristiansand, and Oslo
- Zitronella ("Lemon flavour") (1943) — alternate name for Operation Sizilien

== Allies ==
- Alphabet (1940) (United Kingdom) — evacuation of British troops from Norway
- Apostle (1945) (United Kingdom) — SAS operation to enforce German surrender in Norway
- Archery (1941) — British commando raid on Vågsøy, Norway
- Anklet (1941) — raid on German positions on Lofoten Islands, Norway
- Brandy (1943) — MTB and commando raid on Florø, Norway
- Carthage (1945) — RAF bombing of the Gestapo headquarters in Copenhagen, Denmark
- Cartoon (1943) — commando raid on the island of Stord near Leirvik, Norway
- Catherine (1939) British plan to gain control of Baltic Sea
- Claymore (1941) — British raid on Lofoten Islands, Norway
- Crackers (1943) — British raid at Sognefjord, Norway
- Doomsday (1945) (United Kingdom) — alternative name for Apostle
- Freshman (1942) — attempted raid on a Norwegian heavy water plant at Vemork, see Gunnerside
  - Grouse (1942) — Norwegian guide party for Freshman
- Gunnerside (1943) — 2nd raid on the Norwegian heavy water plant at Vemork
- Fork (1940) — Invasion of Iceland by British.
- Gauntlet (1941) — raid on Spitzbergen
- Jupiter (1942) — suggested invasion of Norway
- Kitbag (1941) — aborted commando raid on town of Florø in Norway
- Leader (1943) — American/British Home Fleet raid on German shipping along the coast of Norway in the Bodø area
- Musketoon (1942) — British/ Norwegian destruction of a power station in Norway
- R 4 (1940) — Planned British invasion of Norway
- Source (1943) — British response to German operation Sizilien
- The Sepals/Perianth Operation (1944) — OSS supported operation in Sweden
- Sunshine (1944) — Combined British/Norwegian operation to protect essential power installations against possible German scorched earth tactics towards the end of the war
- Valentine (1940) — British occupation of the Faroe Islands
- Wilfred (1940) — British plan to mine the Norwegian coast

== Other ==
- Rädda Danmark ("Save Denmark") (1945) — Swedish plan to liberate Denmark before the German surrender
  - Rädda Själland ("Save Zealand") (1945) — planned Swedish landings on Zealand
  - Rädda Bornholm ("Save Bornholm") (1945) — planned Swedish landings on Bornholm

== See also ==
- List of World War II military operations
