= Operation Foxrock =

Cancelled British commando raid during WW2

Operation Foxrock was a planned raid by British Commandos during the Second World War.

Following the success of St Nazaire raid a similar raid was planned for June 1942 on Saint-Valery-sur-Somme. The raiding force were 100 men from No. 12 Commando were to destroy the entrance to the Somme Canal and other installations. The raid was abandoned due to the convoy being discovered by German Naval forces.
