= Operation Forfar =

1943 British commando raids

- Part of North West Europe Campaign (Part of World War II)
Date	July – September 1943
Location	Northern France

Belligerents
United Kingdom; Free France	Germany

Operation Forfar was the name given to a series of British Commando raids on the French coast during World War II. The raids were part of Operation Starkey, a military deception intended to draw out the Luftwaffe. The purpose of these raids was to identify German coastal units and to gain technical intelligence on German equipment, creating the impression of pre-invasion reconnaissance.

== Background ==
In January 1943 Allied high command put off the invasion of France until the following year, and by April had decided to focus on the Mediterranean. The newly appointed Chief of Staff to the Supreme Allied Command (COSSAC), Major-General Frederick Morgan, was directed to conduct military deception operations against western Europe, in the hope that it would tie down enemy forces during the assault on the south of the continent. The directive included explicit reference to creating fictional amphibious assaults on the French coastline, in an effort to draw out the Luftwaffe.

Morgan and John Bevan, head of the London Controlling Section (LCS), established a deception planning section of COSSAC called "Ops (B)", under Lieutenant-Colonel J. A. Jervis-Read. The section, alongside the LCS, began outlining a plan to meet the 1943 targets. On 3 June they submitted three operations (Starkey, Wadham and Tindall), under the overall name Cockade to the Chiefs of Staff for approval.

== Starkey ==
Operation Starkey was a threatened invasion in the Pas de Calais area of France in early September 1943, with the intention of drawing the Luftwaffe out to combat the threat, and into an air battle. As well as collecting up landing craft and other physical deception, the plan called for Commando raids on the French coast. Each raiding party was made up of around ten men, drawn from No. 10 and No. 12 Commando as well as the Special Boat Squadron. The objective within the Starkey "story" was reconnaissance for the coming invasion. To that end the raiders left behind letters for the enemy to pick up.

Both Charles Cruickshank in his book Deception in World War II and Thaddeus Holt, in his book The Deceivers state that Forfar was planned as fourteen missions, between July and September 1943 – but that only eight were carried out (One, Forfar Beer, had to be aborted three times). In his history of 10 Commando Nick van der Bijl places the planned number at thirteen, with only 6 undertaken (one had to be aborted twice).

== Raids ==
Codename	Date	Force	Target	Objective	Outcome
Beer	3–4 September	No. 12 Commando; No. 1 French troop, No. 10 Commando	Eletot	Beach reconnaissance	Aborted three times before a successful landing was achieved; first between 3–5 August and then on 1–2 September.
Dog	5–6 July	No. 12 Commando	Biville	Reconnaissance and capture prisoners	The Motor Torpedo Boat came under fire as the commandos were put ashore.
Easy	3–4 July	No. 12 Commando	Onival	Reconnaissance and capture prisoners	
How	July/August 1943		Quend		
Item	2–3 September	No. 12 Commando; No. 3 troop, No. 10 Commando	St Valery en Caux	Prisoner capture, examination of searchlight emplacement	The raid was a partial success. The team was successfully parachuted in but their ship was swamped when leaving, with the loss of all equipment.
Love	3–4 August	Special Boat Section	Dunkirk	Reconnaissance of pier/Prisoner Capture	The team were forced to withdraw when picked up by searchlight.
