= Operation Rumford =

Operation Rumford was a British Commando raid during the Second World War. It was carried out over the night of 25/26 August 1944, by the Belgian No. 4 Troop of No. 10 (Inter-Allied) Commando who had returned to England in June and were selected to capture the French Isle of Yeu only to find during a reconnaissance that the Germans had already left.

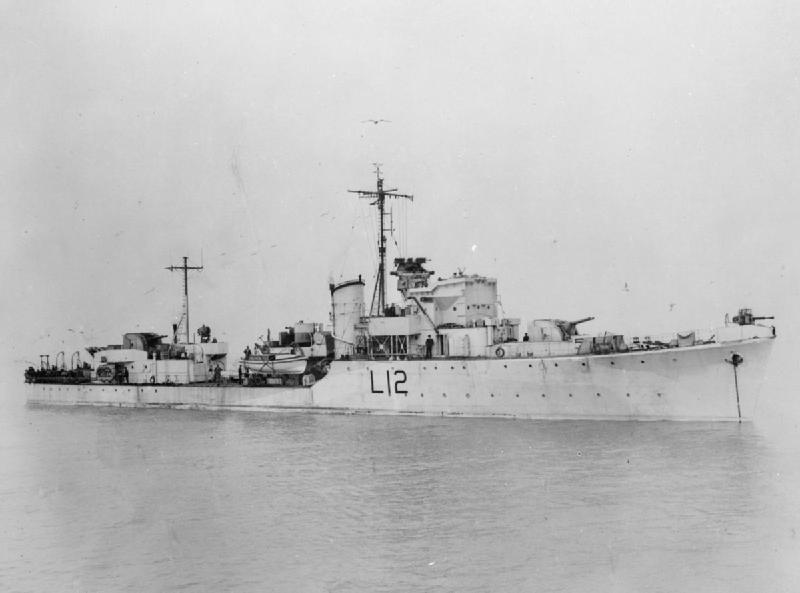
HMS Albrighton

The raid was carried out by five commando's under Lieutenant W Dauppe. They were taken to Isle of Yeu by the Hunt class destroyer HMS Albrighton captained by Lieutenant J J S Hooker. Lance-Corporal Legand landed the party ashore, where they found, after interrogating a local, that the German's abandoned the isle for the French mainland taking their battery of 75mm guns with them.

On the return journey HMS Albrighton intercepted and captured two trawlers carrying 22 Germans who had apparently murdered their officers and were fleeing to Spain. The Germans were taken prisoner and trawlers sunk by the Albrighton.

Lieutenant Dauppe and the Commando's went on to participate in Operation Infatuate the following month.
