= Operation Roundabout =

WW2 British Commando raid (1943)

Operation Roundabout was a British Commando raid that took place on 23 March 1943, during the Second World War. The Commando party was commanded by Captain Gilchrist of No. 12 Commando and included two Commandos from the same unit, as well as an officer and four men from the 29th Ranger Battalion and four Norwegian soldiers

The raid was supposed to destroy a bridge over a Fjord but was unsuccessful when one of the Norwegians dropped the magazine for his machine gun, alerting the German guards.
