= Operation Aflame =

1942 planned operation in World War II

- Part of Operation Overthrow, World War II
Date	September 30, 1942 – October 31, 1942 (1 month, 1 day)
Location	North-West Europe
Result	Cancelled

Units involved
- No. 12 Commando, British Army, UK

For World War II military fire weapons, see M1 flamethrower and M2 flamethrower. For other fire weapons, see Flamethrower (disambiguation).

Operation Aflame was a planned combined operations raid by No. 12 Commando, part of the British army, against Berck in October 1942.

The plan was to have been based on a naval demonstration off the coast, and to have a drop of dummy paratroops and the landing of No. 12 Commando to persuade the Germans that a major landing was about to be made, thereby forcing a major German air response.

Aflame was supposed to be part of the larger strategic operation, Operation Overthrow.
