= Operation Hardtack (commando raid) =

Series of British Commando raids during WW2

- Part of North West Europe Campaign (Part of World War II)
Date	24–28 December 1943
Location	Channel Islands and Northern France

Belligerents
United Kingdom; Free France	Nazi Germany

Operation Hardtack was the name of a series of British Commando raids during the Second World War. The operation was conducted by No. 10 (Inter-Allied) Commando, No. 12 Commando and the Special Boat Service, and took place on the Channel Islands and the northern coast of France in December 1943. Most of the raids consisted of ten men of various ranks, carried by Motor Torpedo Boats and dories, except for one operation, which was an airborne landing. The raids were ended by order of Major General Robert Laycock because they caused the enemy to bring reinforcements, which could have been detrimental to the Allies' strategy.

== Raids ==
Codename	Date	Force	Target	Objective	Outcome
Hardtack 4	26/27 December 1943	No. 12 Commando; No. 8 French Troop, No. 10 Commando	Biville-sur-Mer actually Criel-sur-Mer	Reconnaissance and capture prisoners	The Commandos were forced to withdraw by German patrol activity having actually landed near Creil-Sur-Mer. Two soldiers climbed the cliffs and encountered a patrol of approx 15 Germans. The leader, Cpl (later Sgt) Douglas Nash was awarded the Military Medal for covering the withdrawal.
Hardtack 5	26/27 December 1943	No. 10 (Inter-Allied) Commando	Onival	Reconnaissance and capture prisoners	One Commando was injured by an anti-personnel mine on landing; the rest spent four and a half hours ashore but did not see any Germans, just unoccupied strong points.
Hardtack 7	25/26 & 27/28 December 1943	No. 12 Commando; No. 8 French Troop, No. 10 Commando	Sark	Reconnaissance and capture prisoners	On the first attempt the Commandos had to return to England when they were unable to scale the cliffs, the second attempt was abandoned when the Commandos entered a minefield setting off a number of S-mines, one was injured and two died, their bodies left in the minefield on Sark.
Hardtack 11	24/25 & 26/27 December 1943	No. 1 & No. 8 French troops, No. 10 Commando	Gravelines	Reconnaissance of beaches and sand dunes	Landed safely, but the small dory was swamped and the commandos were stranded. One probably drowned, the rest made their way inland becoming separated and attempted to avoid capture, at least some of them managed to join the French Resistance.
Hardtack 13	26/27 December 1943	No. 1 French Troop, No. 10 Commando; SBS	Bénouville-Etretat, Seine-Maritime		
Hardtack 21	26/27 December 1943	No. 1 French Troop, No. 10 Commando	Quinéville	Reconnaissance and capture prisoners	The raid gathered information on the defensive obstacles on what would become Utah Beach.
Hardtack 22	January 1944 (Cancelled)	No. 10 Commando, later 2nd US Rangers	Herm	Reconnaissance and capture prisoners	Raid was cancelled at the planning stage.
Hardtack 23	27/28 December 1943	No. 1 French Troop, No. 10 Commando	Ostend	Reconnaissance and capture prisoners	The raid was called off after their Motor Torpedo Boat transport ran aground.
Hardtack 28	25/26 December 1943	No. 8 French Troop, No. 10 Commando; No. 12 Commando	Jersey	Take sample of barbed wire and capture prisoners	Team of 8 landed safely at Petit Port; climbing the cliff, they failed to locate a German soldier. On returning to the beach, a mine was set off, seriously injuring Captain Ayton, who was taken to the beach and returned to England, where he died of his wounds.
Hardtack 36	24/25 December 1943	No. 8 French Troop, No. 10 Commando	Wassenaar	Reconnaissance and capture prisoners	All the Commandos involved were killed after landing.
