= Operation Accumulator =

Allied naval operation

Operation Accumulator was an Allied naval operation near the Channel Islands on the night of 12/13 June 1944, in support of Operation Overlord, the invasion of France.

As part of Operation Fortitude, a series of deception operations had been used to divert attention from the Allied landings by suggesting that a second invasion force was still waiting to land. This caused the defenders to divert their forces from the fighting in Normandy, holding them in reserve for an invasion in the Pas de Calais, to the east.

Some days after the initial landings, it was decided to mount a smaller operation to simulate a follow-up landing force heading for Granville, at the western side of the Cotentin Peninsula. The desired effect would be to force the German command to pull units from the front line and redeploy them to protect the western coast.

The plan was for two Royal Canadian Navy destroyers, Haida and Huron, to make a series of fake radio transmissions, which would be intercepted. The beginning of the operation went smoothly, with the two ships signalling that the invasion fleet had been delayed by engine problems, and giving a revised plan. However, the radios on the Haida broke down, forcing the Huron to continue alone; the two ships were also spotted by an Allied reconnaissance plane, which radioed back that it had found "unidentified warships".

The operation was a failure; whilst the signals were made, there was no reaction from the German force. This may have been helped by the Allied air report – the pilot would have been informed – and by a lack of any corroborating evidence; for example, there was no attempt at spoofing radar signals, as had been carried out for the main invasion by Operation Glimmer and Operation Taxable.
