= Operation Brandy =

WW2 British commando raid (1943)

Coordinates: 61°36′07″N 5°01′45″E

Operation Brandy was a raid on Florø, Norway by British Commandos and Motor Torpedo Boats during the Second World War. The raid in the evening of 14. March 1943, consisted of two Norwegian Motor Torpedo Boats (MTB 619 and MTB 631) and seven men from No.10 (Inter-Allied) Commando and No.12 Commando. The German steamer Optima (1249 grt) was torpedoed and sunk; another ship struck a mine laid by the MTBs. MTB 631 ran aground and had to be abandoned.
