= Operation Tarbrush =

WWII British commando raids

- Part of North West Europe Campaign (Part of World War II)
Date	15 May - 18 May 1944
Location	Northern France

Belligerents
United Kingdom; Free French Forces	Nazi Germany

Commanders and leaders
(United Kingdom) George Lane	

Units involved
British Commando: No.10 Commando	

Operation Tarbrush was the name of a series of British Commando raids during the Second World War, which took place in 1944. Members of No. 10 (Inter-Allied) Commando were responsible for this operation, which was intended to obtain photographs and other evidence of mines and other traps.

Three of the missions were commanded by George Lane. Lane and his team examined mines near Ault on the French coast. During the preparations for D-Day, an RAF plane had attacked a pillbox on the French coast. Since the aircraft was equipped with a camera, films were taken during the flyover. The scientists who examined the images noticed that underwater explosions took place when the plane's rockets fell short and fell into the ocean. Since this was possible evidence of mines, the Allied forces needed to investigate whether the enemy had deployed a new type of mine.

The reconnaissance mission led by Lane required a two-mile approach up to the coast, which was heavily guarded. His expedition found that in the water near the coast, the Germans had equipped Teller mines on stakes. When the tide was in, the mines would be underwater, and landing craft would be unable to see them at high tide and especially at night, and thus would strike them. However, the setup did not account for the fact that the mines were not waterproof and thus had corroded.

Because of the corrosion, the mines only detonated because of the rockets from the RAF fighter, which had fallen short. Lane's conclusion was that the deployment was only a hasty improvisation, and did not represent an advance in the Germans' mine technology.

Four of the missions were commanded by Captain Hilton-Jones, based in Dover. Major Ernest Leigh Smith (then Captain) led operation Tarbrush 8 on Quend Plage and successfully returned vital information including a Teller mine. All his team was decorated and he was awarded the Military Cross. He later joined two similar operations in Westkapelle ahead of the Walcheren landings of 1 November 1944.

== Raids ==
Codename	Date	Force	Target
Tarbrush 3	16/17 May 1944		Bray Dunes
Tarbrush 5	15/16 May 1944		Dunkirk
Tarbrush 8	15/16 May 1944		Quend
Tarbrush 10	17/18 May 1944		Onival
