= Operation Astrakan =

Operation Astrakan was a raid by British Commandos during the Second World War. The objective of the operation was to gather reconnaissance for Operation Sunstar. The raid against Houlgate in France was carried out by No. 101 (Folbot) Troop, No. 6 Commando over the night of 12/13 November 1941.
