= Operation Crackers =

WW2 British Commando raid (1943)

Operation Crackers was a British Commando raid during the Second World War. The raid from the 23 February to the 3 March 1943 at Sognefjord in Norway, consisted of 16 soldiers drawn from No. 10 (Inter-Allied) Commando, No. 12 Commando and No. 30 Commando. The original object of the raid was to attack an observation post and take a look at another; rough seas prevented this, so instead the raiders took over the observation post for a week undetected, gathering information.
