= Operation J V =

Smallest British Commando raid of WW2

Operation J V was a British Commando raid over the night of 11/12 April 1942, during the Second World War. It was carried out by two men, Captain Gerald Montanaro, and Trooper Preece of 101 (Folbot) Troop, No. 6 Commando. The two men paddled a two-man canoe into Boulogne harbour, planted a limpet mine on a German tanker and withdrew unseen.
