= Operation Kitbag =

WW2 British commando raid (1941)

Operation Kitbag was a raid in Norway by British Commandos of No 6 Commando and No. 12 Commando in December 1941, during the Second World War.

On 9 December 1941 detachments from No. 6 and No. 12 Commandos, some Norwegian soldiers, took part in a raid on the town of Florø in Norway. Embarking on HMS Prince Charles, an infantry landing ship, they set out from Scapa Flow. During the voyage, while some of the men were priming grenades for the raid, six men were killed and another 11 were seriously wounded. The decision was made to continue with the raid but due to navigational difficulties the operation was eventually called off when the naval commander was unable to locate the fjord upon which Florø was located.
