= Operation Noah (commando raid) =

During World War II, Operation Noah was a reconnaissance patrol by 41 Belgian members of the Special Air Service who operated in the Ardennes from 16 August to 13 September 1944, at which point they were relieved by the advancing Americans.
