= Operation Batman =

Second World War raid by British Commandos

Operation Batman was a Second World War raid by British Commandos near then-occupied Cherbourg France from 15-16 November 1942. The men meant to take part in the raid were drawn from No. 12 Commando and No. 62 Commando. The raid was canceled before any commandos alit due to high waters that obstructed a safe landing.
