= Életot =

- Commune
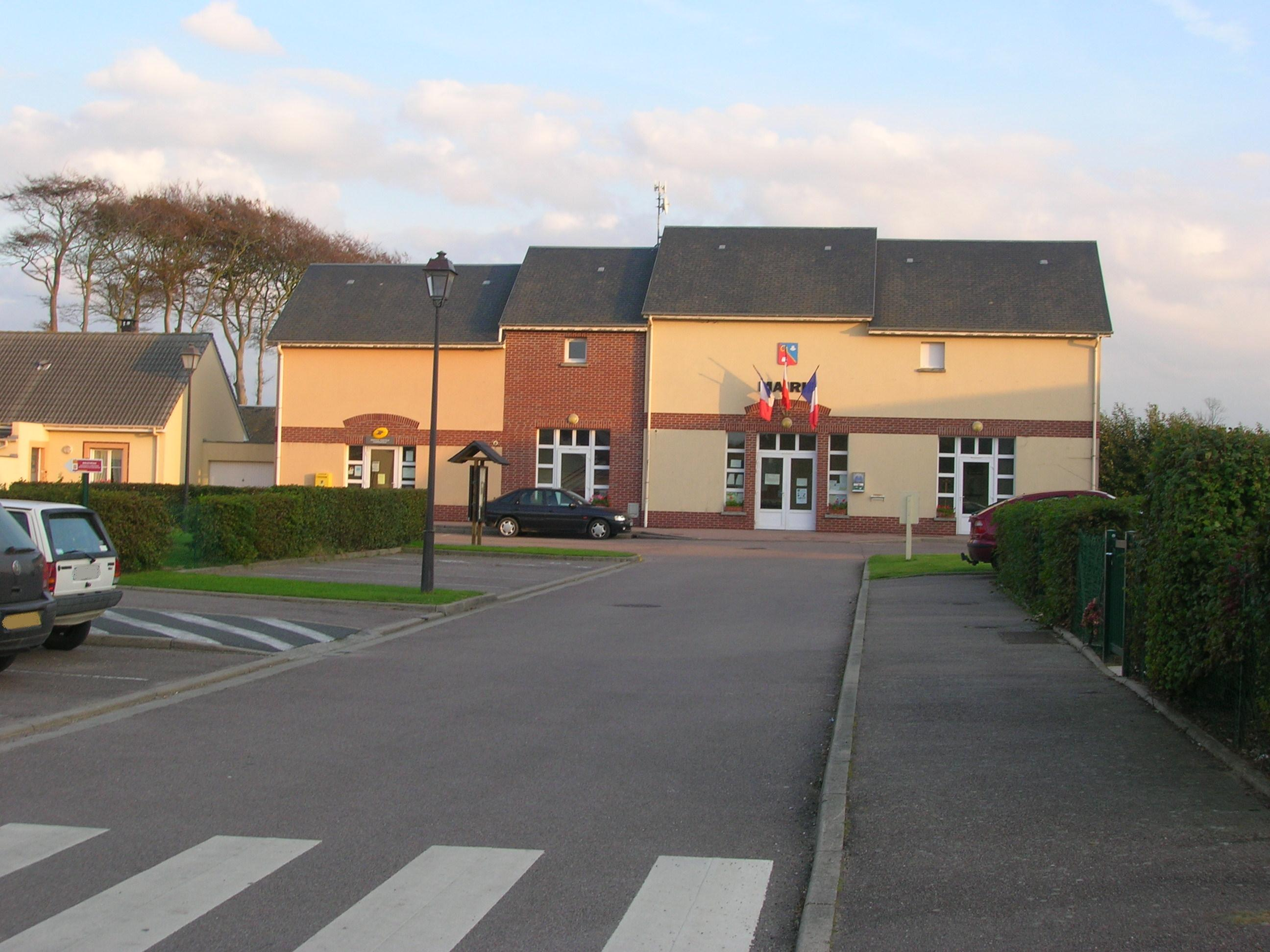
- Town hall and post office

- Coat of arms
- Location of Életot
- Location within France Location within Normandy
- Coordinates: 49°47′21″N 0°27′17″E
- Country: France
- Region: Normandy
- Department: Seine-Maritime
- Arrondissement: Le Havre
- Canton: Fécamp
- Intercommunality: CA Fécamp Caux Littoral
- Area^{1}: 6.81 km^{2} (2.63 sq mi)
- Elevation: 100 m (330 ft)
- Highest elevation: 118 m (387 ft)
- Lowest elevation: 0 m (0 ft)
- Population (2023): 626
  - Density: 91.9/km^{2} (238/sq mi)
- Time zone: UTC+01:00 (CET)
  - Summer (DST): UTC+02:00 (CEST)
- INSEE/Postal code: 76232 /76540
- ^{1} French Land Register data, which excludes lakes, ponds, glaciers > 1 km^{2} (0.386 sq mi or 247 acres) and river estuaries.

Életot is a commune in the Seine-Maritime department in the Normandy region in northern France.

== Geography ==
A farming village on the coast of the Pays de Caux, situated some 32 miles (51 km) northeast of Le Havre, on the D79 road. A pebble beach and spectacular limestone cliffs can be reached by way of the steps of the val d’Ausson.

== Heraldry ==
Arms of Életot	The arms of Életot are blazoned : Per bend sinister azure and gules, an abbot's crozier Or bendwise sinister between an escallop and a roman vase argent.

== Population ==
Historical population
Year	Pop.	±% p.a.
1968	508	—
1975	516	+0.22%
1982	510	−0.17%
1990	552	+0.99%
1999	537	−0.31%
2007	600	+1.40%
2012	618	+0.59%
2017	645	+0.86%
2023	626	−0.50%
Source: INSEE

== Places of interest ==
- The church of St.Pierre, dating from the seventeenth century.

== See also ==
- Communes of the Seine-Maritime department
