= Operation Fahrenheit =

British Commando raid during the Second World War

Operation Fahrenheit was a British Commando raid during the Second World War. It was carried out by a small group of men from No. 12 Commando and No. 62 Commando over the night of 11/12 November 1942.

Captain O B 'Mickey' Rooney, Capt Peter Kemp and six Non-commissioned officers from No. 12 Commando, with two men from No. 62 Commando formed the raiding party.

The objective of the raid was to capture German servicemen for interrogation by attacking a signals station at Pointe de Plouezec on the north Brittany coast. One raiding party left Dartmouth on the 11 November in Motor Torpedo Boat (MTB) 344. After reaching their target they discovered that the cliff tops were heavily mined. Rooney and one of his men checked out the signals station and a nearby pillbox. The signals station was protected by barbed wire and sentries and the pillbox was unoccupied.

Rooney decided to carry out a frontal assault on the signals station. Splitting the unit into three groups, they made their way to within yards of the barbed wire. While Rooney was preparing a hand grenade they were heard by the two sentries. Before the sentries could react they were killed by the hand grenade and sub-machine gun fire. The occupants of the signal station were then engaged, killing two who had come into the open. The others returned fire from inside the signals station and it was decided to withdraw before German reinforcements arrived, alerted by the noise. The party successfully re-embarked and returned to Dartmouth.
