= Operation Abercrombie =

1942 WWII raid in Pas-de-Calais, France

- Part of North West Europe Campaign
| Date | 21–22 April 1942 |
| Location | Hardelot, France 50°37′8.4″N 1°38′31.2″E |
| Result | Allied objectives largely unmet |

Belligerents
| United Kingdom; Canada | Germany |

Commanders and leaders
| Lord Lovat | |

Strength
| 100 British commandos 50 Canadian Infantry; Royal Engineers | Unknown |

Casualties and losses
| 1 injured | Unknown |

During World War II, Operation Abercrombie was an Anglo-Canadian reconnaissance raid on the area around the French coastal village of Hardelot, located south of Boulogne-sur-Mer, in the Pas-de-Calais. It had been scheduled for the night of 19/20 April 1942, but delayed until 21/22 April. The raid was largely unopposed but, on review, the benefits were thought not to have been worth the effort. Due to a navigation error the Canadian detachment lost their way and had to abort.

== Objectives ==
The operation was a reconnaissance in force, intended to reconnoitre the beaches off the village of Hardelot, to capture prisoners and destroy as much equipment as possible, including a searchlight battery.

== Preparation and plans ==
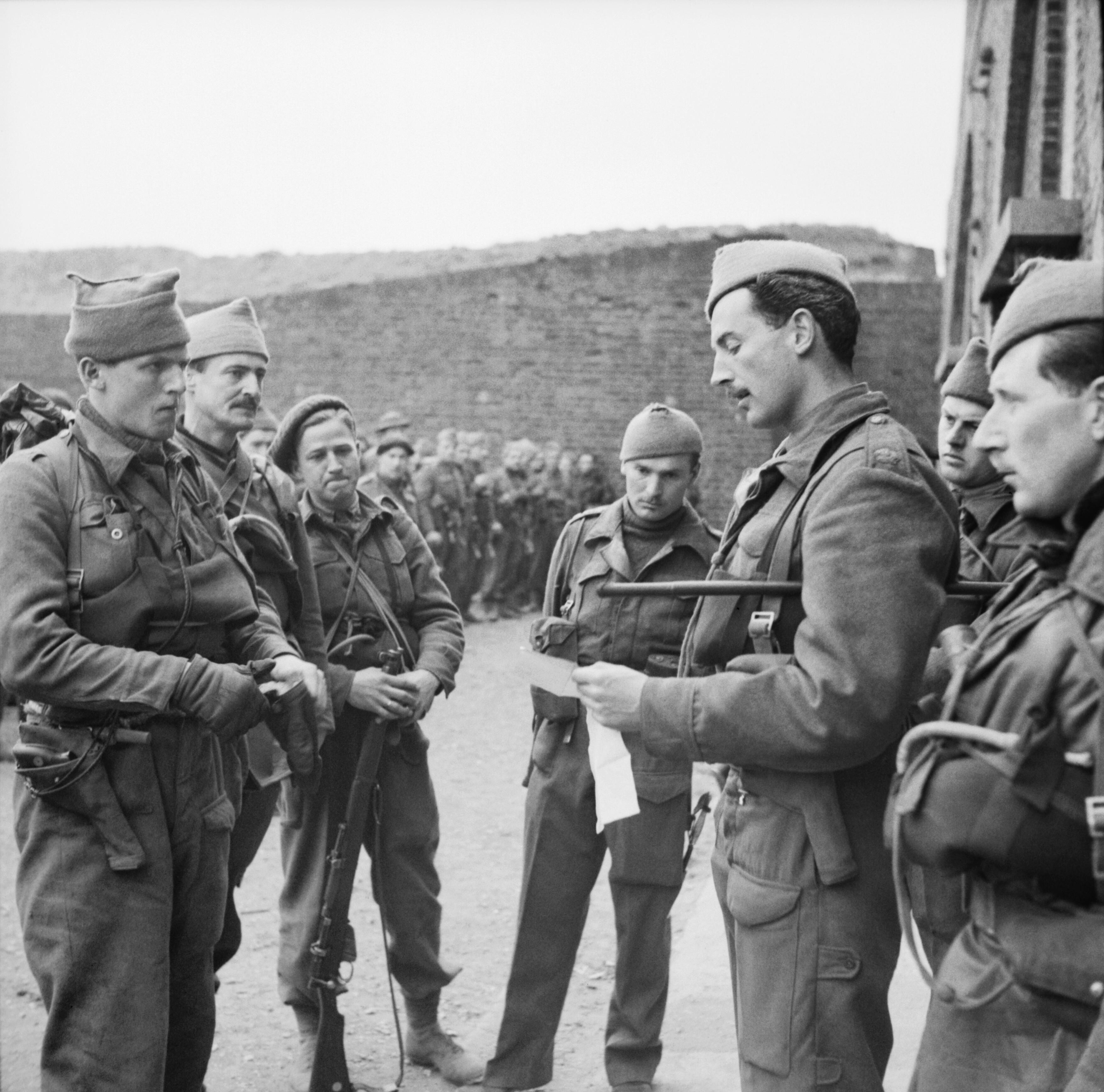
Major Lord Lovat, giving orders to his men before setting out on a commando raid on the French coast near Boulogne, 21 April 1942

The force comprised B and C troops (about 100 men) of No. 4 Commando, 50 men from the Canadian Carleton and York Regiment (3rd Canadian Infantry Brigade) and some Royal Engineers, under the overall command of Major The Lord Lovat of No.4 Commando.

The Commandos trained in the New Forest and Lepe, near Southampton, based aboard the landing ship, HMS Prince Albert on which they were transported to Dover on 18 April. The force was to be carried to France on motor gun boats (MGBs) and there transferred to assault landing craft (LCAs), which the MGBs had towed.

C Troop was to land first, clear obstacles and establish a beachhead; B Troop would pass through C Troop, head inland and execute their tasks. The return journey would be in the LCAs.

== Raid ==
This was the first occasion the new LCA (Landing Craft Assault) was employed, equipped with two machine guns and a mortar.

The convoy of MGBs and LCAs set off on the evening of April 19 but after two hours, an LCA took on water and sank. The two crewmen were recovered but two commandos who had manned a Bren gun were lost and after the search was abandoned the force returned to Dover. A second attempt was made on April 21, with a replacement LCA. The Canadian detachment experienced navigational problems and became separated, eventually attracting tracer fire from the shore returned by their accompanying MGBs (Motor Gun Boats). No Canadian troops disembarked. The Commandos landed further north than intended but were unopposed and escaped detection until among the deep sand dunes and wire entanglements. Support fire from the LCAs partially suppressed moderate German tracer fire from the flanks and the commandos were able to progress.

Defences were found to be light and/or abandoned as they advanced and only three Germans were encountered at close quarters who withdrew immediately. The official report recorded, "no determined opposition". A fighting patrol of 12 men sent to destroy the searchlights reached their objective but had to retire before pressing home their attack due to lack of time remaining signaled by the re-call rocket.

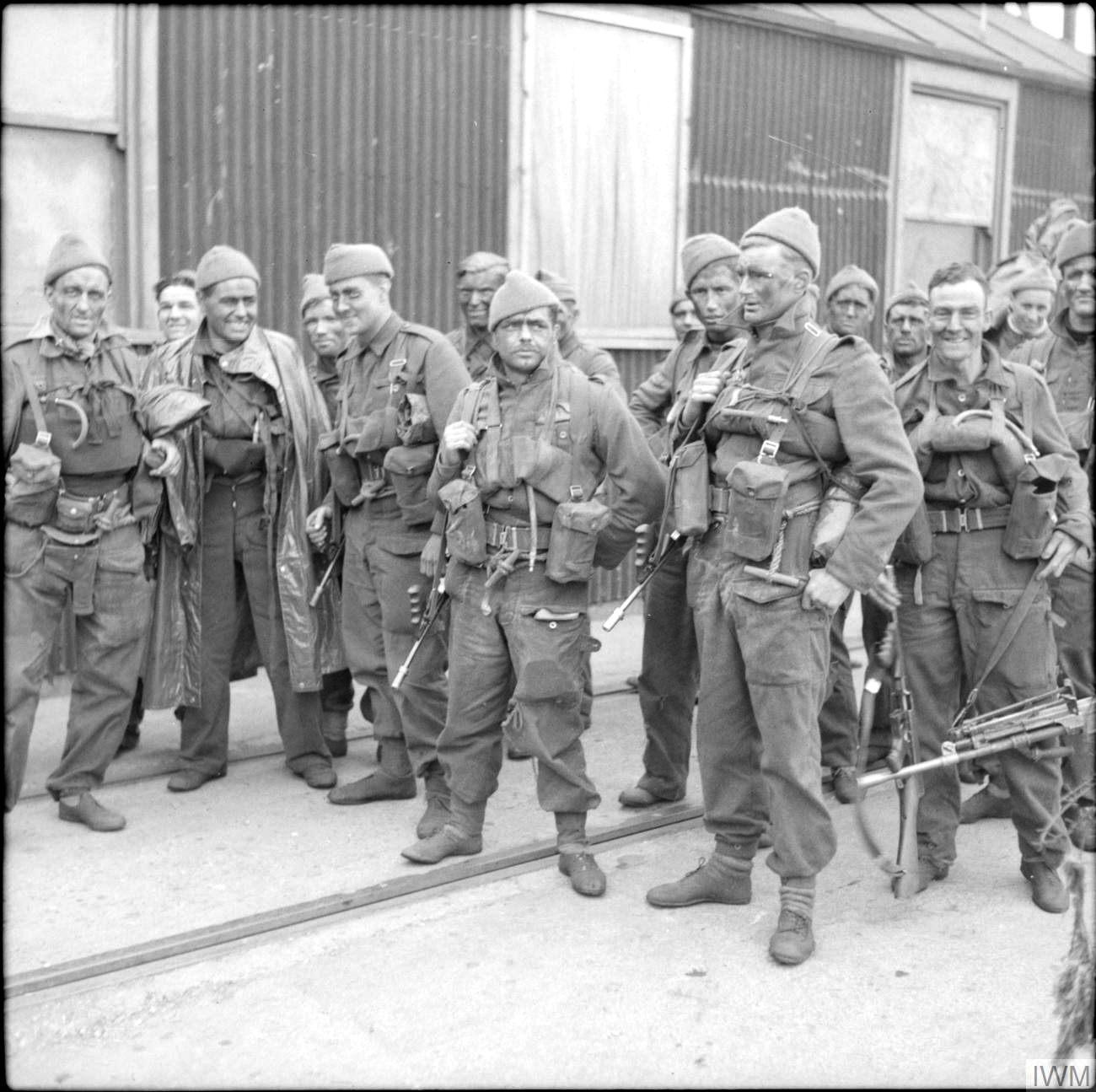
Men of No. 4 Commando after returning from a raid on the French coast near Boulogne, 22 April 1942

The only Allied casualty was a commando who was shot through the ankles after failing to respond to a beachhead sentry's challenge quickly enough. Supporting Navy craft encountered and engaged enemy vessels, including E Boats, sinking at least one and damaging others, for three naval casualties. Enemy casualties were unknown.

== Review ==
Experience of the operation contributed towards Operation Jubilee, the disastrous Combined Operations raid on Dieppe, France, the following August.
