= Operation Chess =

British WWII commando raid

Operation Chess was a British Commando raid during the Second World War. It was carried out by 17 men of No. 12 Commando commanded by a Second Lieutenant Pinckney over the night of 27/28 July 1941.

The target for the raid was Ambleteuse, Pas-de-Calais, France. The raiding party were towed across the English Channel in two Landing Craft by a Motor Launch, which cast them off two miles from the Slack River near Ambleteuse. They remained ashore for one hour, no prisoners were taken.

Cdr. Sir Geoffrey Congreve Bt DSO died of his wounds received during the raid.
