= Saint-Saire =

- Commune
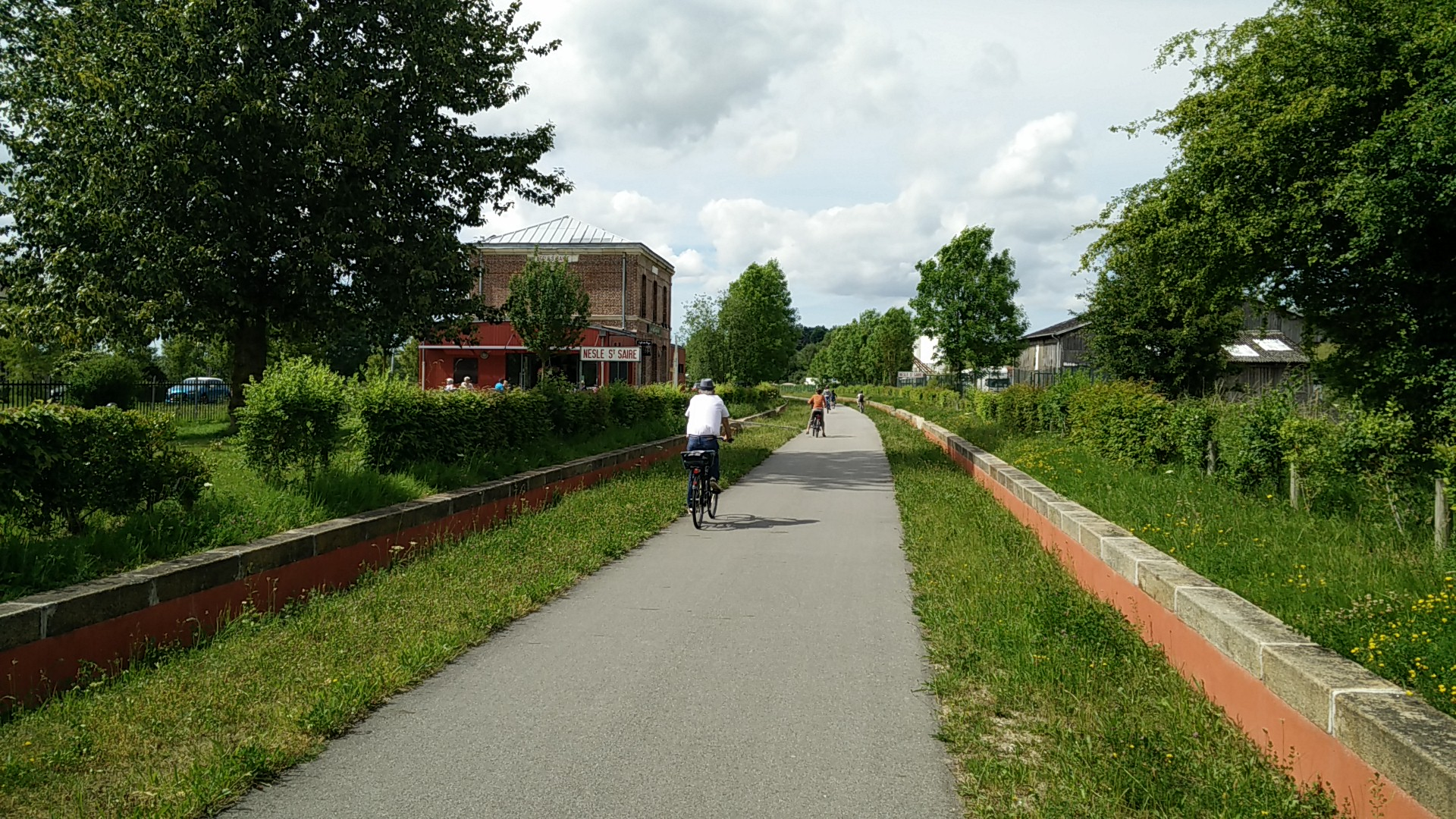
- The green cycleway through the old railway station
- Location of Saint-Saire
- Location within France Location within Normandy
- Coordinates: 49°41′41″N 1°29′37″E
- Country: France
- Region: Normandy
- Department: Seine-Maritime
- Arrondissement: Dieppe
- Canton: Neufchâtel-en-Bray
- Intercommunality: CC Bray-Eawy

Government
  - Mayor (2026–32): Maryse Duval
- Area^{1}: 13.32 km^{2} (5.14 sq mi)
- Elevation: 104 m (341 ft)
- Highest elevation: 193 m (633 ft)
- Lowest elevation: 88 m (289 ft)
- Population (2023): 582
  - Density: 43.7/km^{2} (113/sq mi)
- Time zone: UTC+01:00 (CET)
  - Summer (DST): UTC+02:00 (CEST)
- INSEE/Postal code: 76649 /76270
- ^{1} French Land Register data, which excludes lakes, ponds, glaciers > 1 km^{2} (0.386 sq mi or 247 acres) and river estuaries.

Saint-Saire (French pronunciation: [sɛ̃ sɛʁ]) is a commune in the Seine-Maritime department in the Normandy region in north-western France. It is named after Saint Salvius of Albi.

== Geography ==
A village of farming and associated light industry situated by the banks of the river Béthune in the Pays de Bray, some 30 miles (48 km) southeast of Dieppe at the junction of the D7, D19 and the D1314 roads.

== Population ==
Historical population
Year	Pop.	±% p.a.
1968	514	—
1975	433	−2.42%
1982	374	−2.07%
1990	418	+1.40%
1999	477	+1.48%
2007	582	+2.52%
2012	635	+1.76%
2017	611	−0.77%
2023	582	−0.81%
Source: INSEE

== Places of interest ==
- The church of St. Saire, dating from the thirteenth century.

== People ==
- Henri de Boulainvilliers, French write and historian, was born here.

== See also ==
- Communes of the Seine-Maritime department
