= No. 10 (Inter-Allied) Commando =

British Army WWII commando unit

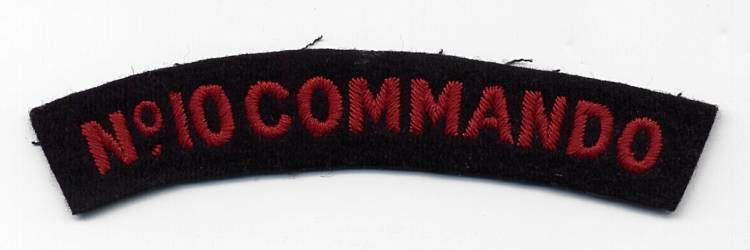
- Active: 1942–1945
- Disbanded: 4 September 1945
- Country: United Kingdom
- Branch: British Army
- Type: Commando
- Size: Maximum 11 Troops
- Part of: Combined Operations 1 Special Service Brigade
- Garrison/HQ: Eastbourne
- Engagements: Second World War

Commanders
- Notable commanders: Dudley Lister; Peter Laycock

Insignia
- Combined Operations recognition badge

No. 10 (Inter-Allied) Commando was a Commando unit of the British Army during the Second World War, recruited largely from non-British personnel from German-occupied Europe. This unit was used to help co-ordinate attacks with other Allied forces.

The unit's origins were in a British volunteer unit proposed in August 1940 which recruited from Northern Command. A low number of recruits, however, meant that the unit was disbanded and the volunteers returned to their units. In July 1942, the unit was raised again as a multinational force, recruiting volunteers from German-occupied Europe and enemy aliens. It included volunteers from France, Belgium, the Netherlands, Norway, Denmark, Poland and Yugoslavia, organised into independent sub-units known as "troops".

Units from No. 10 (Inter-Allied) Commando served in North-West Europe, the Mediterranean, Scandinavia and Burma, mostly in small numbers attached to other military formations. By the end of the war, No. 10 Commando had become the largest commando formation in the British Army.

== Background ==
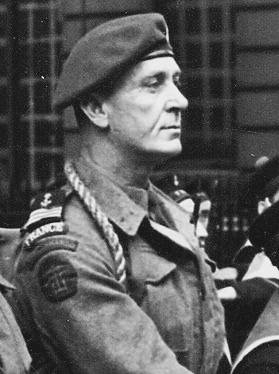
Philippe Kieffer in British uniform with French rank depicted, note the toggle rope around the neck

"Commando" units were first created in 1940, by order of the British Prime Minister Winston Churchill, as small highly trained units which would "develop a reign of terror down the enemy coast". At first they were a small force of volunteers who carried out small raids against enemy-occupied territory, but by 1943 their role had changed into lightly equipped shock troops specialised in spearheading amphibious assault landings, commando style raids, long-range penetration, and urban warfare.

The man selected as the overall commander of the force was Admiral Sir Roger Keyes, himself a veteran of the Gallipoli Campaign and the Zeebrugge raid of the First World War. By March 1941 there were 11 battalion-sized units now called commandos. Each commando would consist of around 390 men in a small headquarters and six "troops" of three officers and 62 men each.

The idea for a foreign commando unit came from a junior French naval officer, Philippe Kieffer, after he heard of the successful Lofoten raid. The idea was eventually put to the then Chief of Combined Operations, Admiral Lord Louis Mountbatten who could see the value of a foreign commando unit but insisted it should include volunteers from all the occupied territories. It falls under the command of 1st Special Service Brigade.

== Formation ==
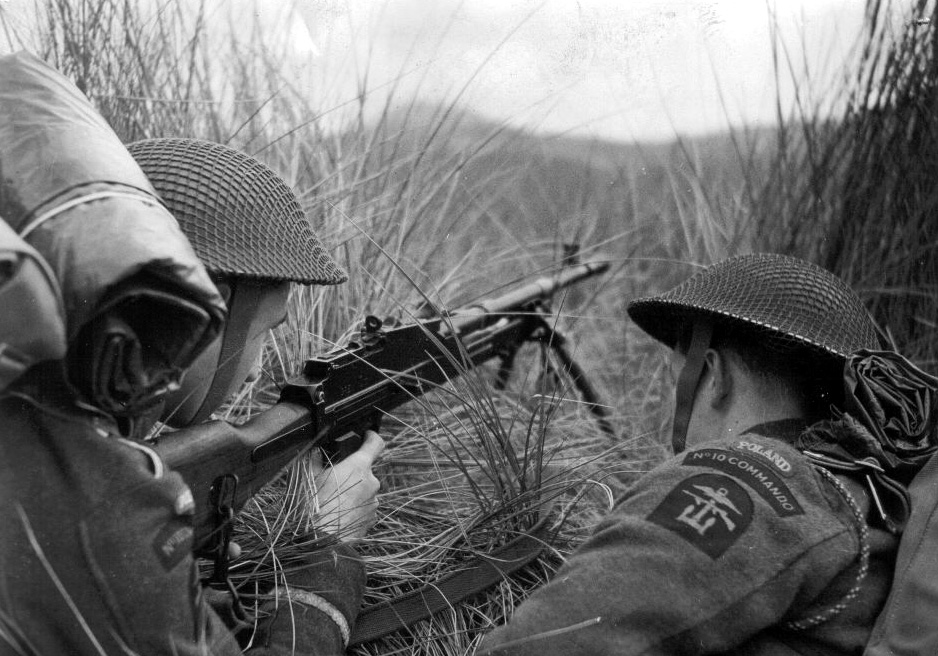
Men from No. 6 Polish Troop on exercise in Scotland 1943. Note the No.10 Commando, Poland and the combined operations badges

No. 10 (Inter-Allied) Commando under the command of Lieutenant Colonel Dudley Lister was formed on 2 July 1942. The men of the new commando were all foreigners except for the British headquarters. Headquarters consisted of a British commanding officer, second in command, adjutant, intelligence officer and NCO, medical officer and medical orderlies, signals officer and signals section, training officer, quartermaster, administration officer and drivers. The formation of No. 10 (Inter-Allied) Commando meant that by the end of the war it was the largest commando unit in the British Army. Like all British Commandos the men of No. 10 (Inter-Allied) Commando went through the six-week intensive commando course at Achnacarry. The course in the Scottish Highlands concentrated on fitness, speed marches, weapons training, map reading, climbing, small boat operations and demolitions both by day and by night.

In May 1943 the commando moved to Eastbourne on the Sussex coast where they carried out specialist training which unusually for a non-parachute unit included parachute training at No.1 Parachute Training School RAF, Ringway near Manchester (over 80% of the Polish troop were parachute qualified) and they also trained in mountain climbing and Arctic warfare. At the same time as the move to Eastbourne the commando got a new commanding officer when Lieutenant Colonel Peter Laycock took over command on 15 May.

=== No. 1 (French) Troop ===
The French Commando Memorial at Criccieth in North Wales where the Troop were based for training in 1942-43.

No. 1 Troop was formed in April 1942 by Philippe Kieffer, from an intake of 40 Frenchmen, who were initially called 1re Compagnie de Fusiliers Marins (1st Company of Naval Rifles). Over time the Unit grew up to a second troop (see below, Troop 8) and a half Troop (K-GUN). The unit retained its links with the Free French Forces wearing FNFL insignia and headgear. Troop 1, Troop 8 and K-Gun were attached to No 4 Commando for Overlord operation and the Netherlands campaign.

=== No. 2 (Dutch) Troop ===
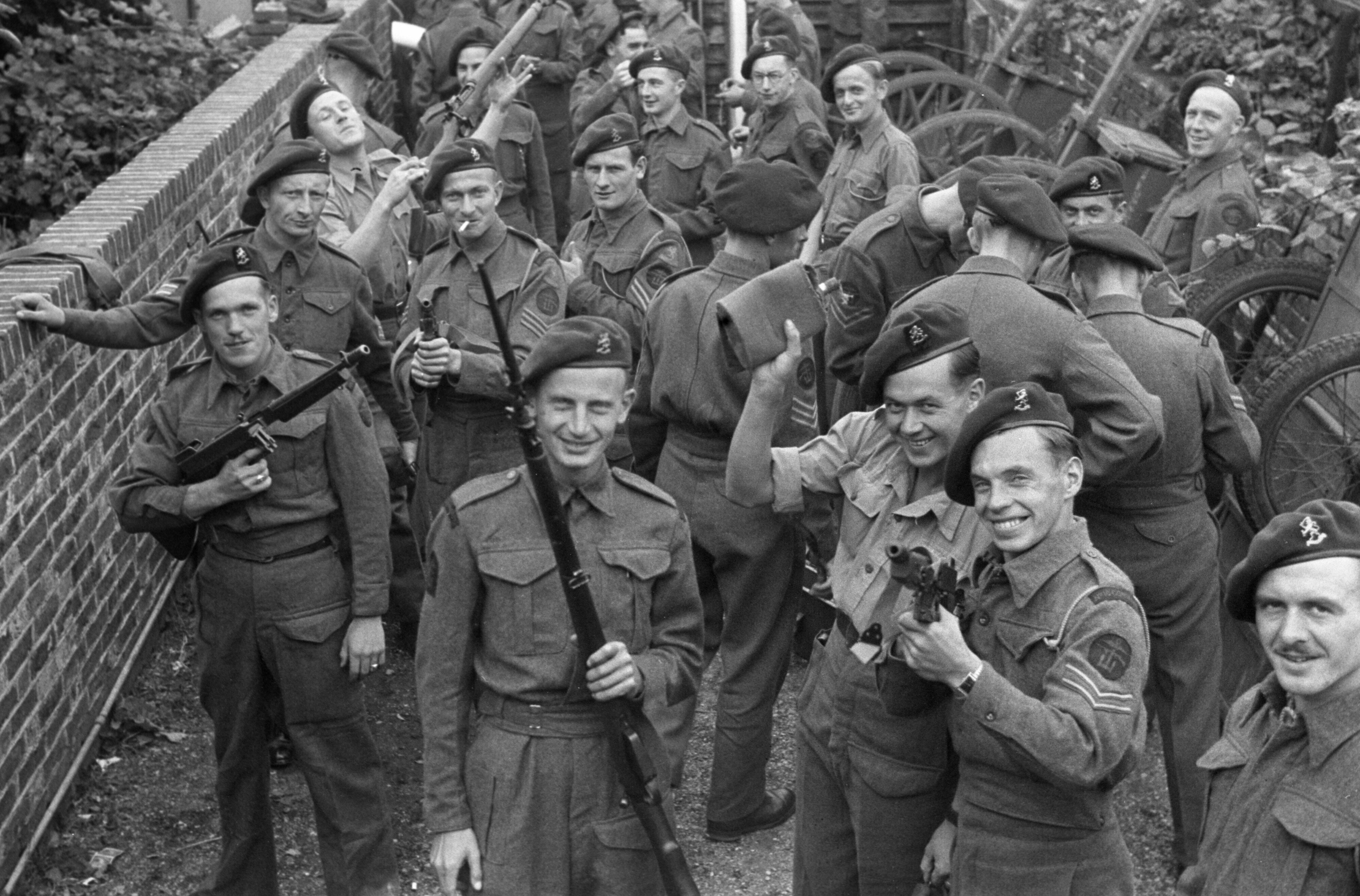
No.2 (Dutch) Troop before deployment in Operation Market Garden.

No. 2 Troop consisted of 62 men under command of Captain Mulders. The troop formed in June 1942 was always below establishment and never deployed as a complete independent unit. The men acted as liaison officers, guides and interpreters during operations Market Garden, Infatuate I and II.

About 48 men from the Royal Brigade "Princess Irene" started on 22 March 1942 with preliminary training at No 3, No 4, No 9 and No 12 Commando. In May 1942, the group met at the Commando Basic Training Centre in Achnacarry, Scotland, for command training. Ultimately, of those 48 men, 25 received the green beret. No. 2 Dutch Troop was part of No. 10 (Inter-Allied) Commando. 29 June 1942, the graduates left Achnacarry and moved on to RAF Dundonald at Troon on the Scottish west coast for commando air support and assault troop training. It was here the foundations were laid for the post-war Dutch commando unit. From Troon they went to the new port of Portmadoc in North Wales, where they were included as No. 2 (Dutch) Troop in No. 10 (Inter-Allied) Commando. Several members of the Brigade “Princess Irene” then followed the commando training to supplement No 2 Dutch Troop. In May 1943 the strength of No 2 Dutch Troop was five officers, 12 NCOs and 67 corporals and men. In 1943 No. 2 (Dutch) Troop was assigned to be deployed in the Far East against the Japanese. Only five Dutchmen were deployed from India, partly with No 44 (Royal Marine) Commando and partly with No 5 Commando, behind enemy lines in Araan, Burma.

After the war, members of No. 2 Dutch troop served in Depot Speciale Troepen (DST) after former in Korps Speciale Troepen (KST) (1945–1950); after that it formed the Korps Commandotroepen.

=== No. 3 Troop ("X" Troop) ===
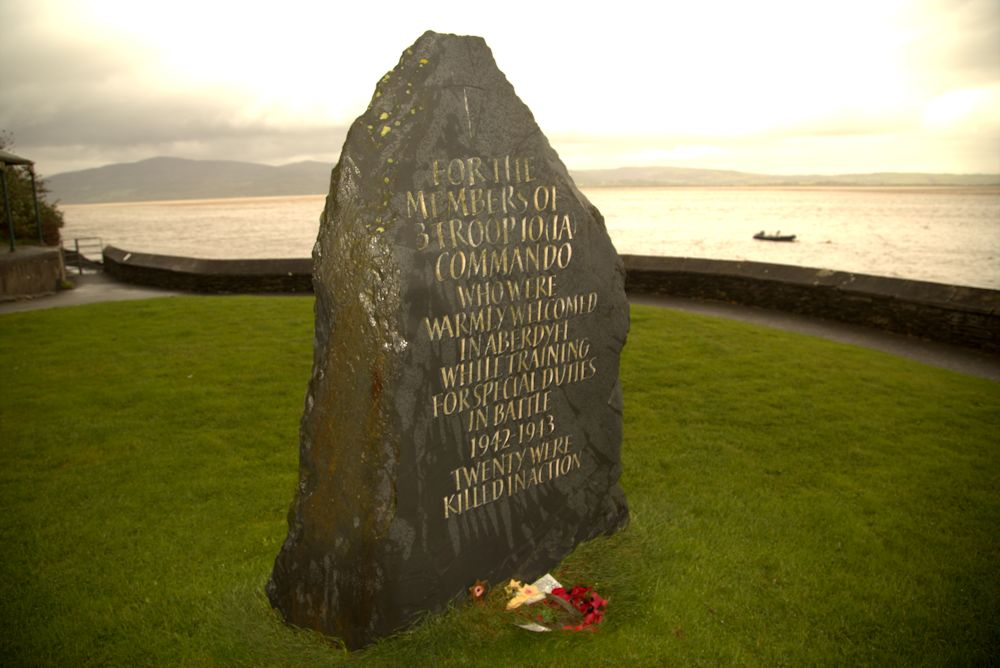
Memorial to No. 3 "X" Troop at Aberdovey where their training commenced in 1942.

No. 3 Troop, perhaps better known as "X" Troop, was possibly the strangest unit in the British Army, since it consisted mostly of personnel who were technically enemy aliens – German and Austrian refugees, many of them Jews – under the command of Captain Bryan Hilton-Jones. The existence of No 3 (X) Troop was first publicly referred to in the 1971 edition of the Alpine Journal in its obituary of Bryan Hilton-Jones. Its first members, in July 1942, were eight Sudeten Germans from Czechoslovakia. Officially named No. 3 (British) Troop as a cover, the name "X Troop" was devised by Winston Churchill; "Because they will be unknown warriors... they must perforce be considered an unknown quantity. Since the algebraic symbol for unknown is X, let us call them X Troop".

Most members of the troop were Jews of German, Austrian or Eastern European origin. Other members were German political refugees, or members of other religious minorities persecuted by the Nazis in Germany. They were almost all recruited from the "Alien Companies" of the Pioneer Corps, which had been raised from vetted inmates of internment camps, who had been detained under Defence Regulation 18B as "enemy aliens". Some had arrived in Britain as refugee teenagers in the Kindertransport. One member had been imprisoned in Dachau and Buchenwald concentration camps before escaping. All members of the troop adopted British names and false personal histories.

The total number of men that served in X Troop is given in various sources as between 87, the number given the X Troop war diary, and 142 which includes a half-troop raised in the last days of the war. They never fought as a complete unit but were seconded in groups of two to six to other Commando units as interpreters and interrogators. Their language skills and rigorous Commando training also made them valuable for raiding parties behind enemy lines, gathering intelligence and capturing prisoners.

Initial training for the first fifty three recruits was at Aberdovey on the west coast of Wales, commencing in October 1942. They joined the rest of No. 10 Commando at the Commando Basic Training Centre, Achnacarry. Three X Troopers were selected to participate in the Allied invasion of Sicily, and two played a major role in Operation Tarbrush, a covert reconnaissance of the French coast. Forty five members of X Troop participated in the Normandy landings on 6 June 1944, of whom 27 were killed, wounded or reported missing. X-Troop also participated in the Adriatic campaign;Operation Infatuate, the assault on Walcheren in the Netherlands; Operation Plunder, the Rhine crossing, and the Rhineland Campaign. Following the end of hostilities, X Troop participated in the Denazification programme and gathered evidence of war crimes for the Nuremberg trials.

Three members of this troop wrote books on its history: Ian Dear's Ten Commando, 1942-1945 (1987), Peter Masters' Striking Back: A Jewish Commando's War against the Nazis (1997) and Peter Leighton-Langer's X steht für unbekannt: Deutsche und Österreicher in den britischen Streitkräften im Zweiten Weltkrieg (1999) and The Kings Most Loyal Enemy Aliens (2006). Professor Leah Garrett's history X Troop: The secret Jewish commandos of World War II, published in 2021, found a previously classified report about X Troop's part in the unsuccessful Dieppe raid of 19 August 1942. Five X Troop members, all Sudeten Germans, were ordered to enter the German HQ and "pick up all documents, etc of value, including, if possible, a new German respirator” with the inference that 'respirator' referred to the Enigma cypher machine. It has been suggested that the whole large military operation was cover for the objective of securing Enigma materials.

A memorial at Aberdovey to No. 3 Troop and the twenty members who were killed was unveiled in May 1999.

==== In fiction ====
The Troop's work was the inspiration for James Leasor's 1980 novel The Unknown Warrior. (Note: Published under the title 'X-Troop' and 'Codename Nimrod' in different countries and formats) Leasor had heard the story about the unit from Colonel Sir Ronald Wingate and had it confirmed by Admiral Earl Mountbatten of Burma, who suggested that he write the book. Many of the members of the troop were still alive at the time of writing and so the author was able to carry out interviews with them and others involved, as acknowledged in the book. However many still wished to remain anonymous, fearing retribution for what they did, even though it was 35 years after the end of the war. The book tells the true story of "X" Troop commando Stephen Rigby, a.k.a. Stefan Rosenberg and "Nimrod", a German Jew by birth. He is chosen for a secret and dangerous part in the deception plans to persuade the Germans that the D-Day invasion would take place near Calais and not in Normandy. His secret mission saw him dropped in France, pursued by both the Resistance and the Germans, and eventually briefing in person first Rommel and then Hitler before escaping to return to British forces.

=== No. 4 (Belgian) Troop ===
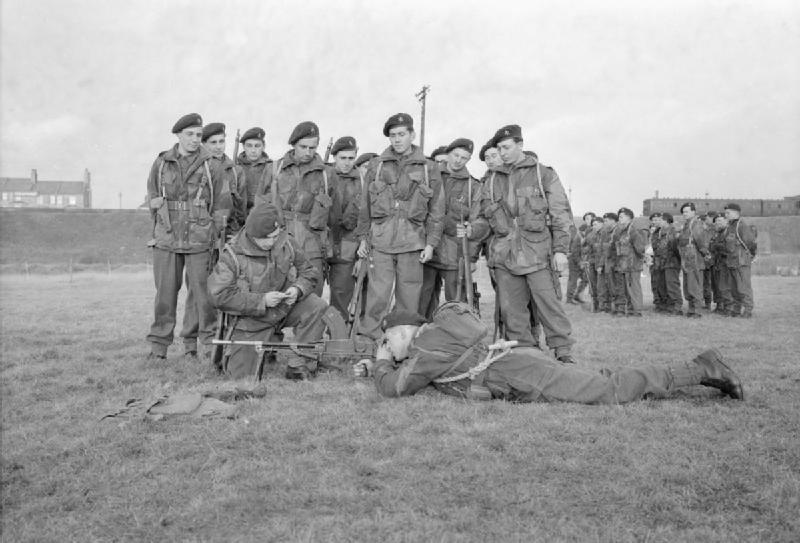
Belgian Commandos in training in Britain, 1945.

No. 4 Troop was formed on 7 August 1942, by seven officers and 100 men from the 1st Independent Belgian Brigade under the command of Captain Georges Danloy. As Belgium had surrendered in 1940, the Belgian forces serving with the Allies risked facing charges of treason on their return; the charges were only annulled in 1948.

After the war, the Belgian troop formed the core of the newly created 2nd Commando Battalion.

=== No. 5 (Norwegian) Troop ===
No. 5 Troop was formed in August 1942 under command Captain Rolv Hauge, the 120 men of the troop came from refugees brought back to Britain after commando raids and sailors stranded abroad after the German invasion of Norway.

=== No. 6 (Polish) Troop ===
No. 6 Troop was first formed in August 1942 as the 1st Independent Commando Company. It was integrated into No. 10 Commando in October 1942. Commanded by Captain Smrokowski, it comprised seven officers and 84 men. These men were sometimes approached to join personally.

=== No. 7 (Mediterranean) Troop ===
No 7 Troop was formed in May 1943 after a need was identified for Italian speakers. The commander was Captain Coates but difficulties finding Italian speakers in the British Army led to the Special Operations Executive offering Italian-speakers from the Royal Yugoslavian Army. The troop's leadership consisted of two British officers and four Serbian officers from the Royal Yugoslav Army, of whom the most senior was Lieutenant Tripović. At its largest, the troop never exceeded 25 men, primarily Slovenes. The unit was renamed No. 7 Yugoslavian Troop and served in the invasion of Sicily and the subsequent invasion of Italy before being deployed to Vis to support Tito's partisans. Upon arrival in Vis, there were internal issues between members of the troop and the communist partisans, as the former were predominantly pro-Karađorđević royalists, which ultimately led to the dissolution of the troop.

=== No. 8 (French) Troop ===
No. 8 Troop was formed in 1943 from 45 men of the disbanded 2nd Naval Infantry Battalion which had been stationed in the Lebanon and men who had been interned and released in Spain. The two French troops were combined under command of Kieffer and called the 1er Bataillon de Fusiliers Marins Commandos ("1st Naval Rifles Commando Battalion"). The troop commander, Captain Charles Trépel, was killed in action with five of his men in a recce on the Dutch coast near Scheveningen on 28 February 1944.

== Operations ==
The men from No. 10 (Inter-Allied) Commando were usually attached to other units who used their knowledge of the area of operations and the language to their advantage as interpreters and interrogators.

=== 1942 ===
The first action men from the Commando took part in was the Raid on Dieppe (Operation Jubilee) on 19 August 1942. Men from No. 3 ("British") Troop were tasked with gathering German documents from the town hall and distribute French Francs to the local French resistance. The No. 1 (French) Troop were attached to No.3 and No. 4 Commando, to act as interpreters, gather information, and also to persuade Frenchmen to return with them and enlist in the Free French forces. The men attached to No. 4 Commando assisted them in the capture of the Hess gun battery.

Most of the men from No. 3 Commando were captured during the landings. The men from No. 10 Commando / No. 3 Troop had one killed and two captured and never heard of again. Among the Frenchmen of No. 10 Commando / No. 7 Troop captured were Sergeant Major Montailleur and Corporal Cesar. Montaillaur was executed under the Commando Order issued by Adolf Hitler, but Cesar managed to persuade the Germans he was a French Canadian and eventually escaped and returned to England.

=== 1943 ===
In early 1943, No. 5 Norwegian Troop worked with No. 12 and No. 14 Commando raiding the Norwegian coast from their base in Lerwick in the Shetland Islands and No. 3 Troop were involved in the Sicily landings (Operation Husky) attached to No. 40 (Royal Marine) Commando and No. 41 (Royal Marine) Commando and later the landings on mainland Italy.

Starting in July a series of raids were carried out, by men from the two French troops and No. 3 Troop, on the French and Low Countries coastlines. These raids under the code names of Operation Forfar, Operation Hardtack and Operation Tarbrush were for beach reconnaissance, for the purpose of bringing back photographs and examples of mines and obstacles that had been laid. In one of these raids Hungarian-born Lieutenant George Lane (real name Gyuri Lányi) was captured and taken to see Field Marshal Erwin Rommel to be questioned, Lane believed he was not executed under the Commando Order because of his meeting with Rommel. In total 12 men were reported missing during the Hardtack raids and only five were later accounted for. The commando also took over responsibility for small-scale parachute operations together with 4 (PARA) Troop, No. 12 Commando in September.

In November No. 4 Belgian and No. 6 Polish Troops joined the 2nd Special Service Brigade in Italy. Notably the Poles captured a German-occupied village alone when the 2/6th Battalion Queen's Regiment failed to reach a rendezvous on time. Later in the year No. 2 Dutch Troop was sent to the Far East to work with No. 44 (Royal Marine) Commando and No. 5 Commando behind the Japanese lines in the Arakan in Burma.

=== 1944 ===
In January 1944 the Belgian No. 4 Troop and the Yugoslav No. 7 Troop attached to the 2nd Special Service Brigade were sent to the Adriatic to assist the Yugoslav Partisans. Political differences in the Yugoslav troop and hostility from the partisans led to its disbandment. No. 4 Troop then worked with the Vis Motor Gun Boat flotilla boarding enemy shipping. In April 1944, the commando lost No. 6 Polish Troop which was transferred to the II Polish Corps and later took part in the Polish assault on Monte Cassino.

By the time of the D-Day landings the commando had lost the Yugoslav and Polish troops, and the two French troops were attached to No. 4 Commando in the 1st Special Service Brigade and landed on Sword Beach. No. 3 Troop was divided by sections between the other eight commando units involved in the landings.

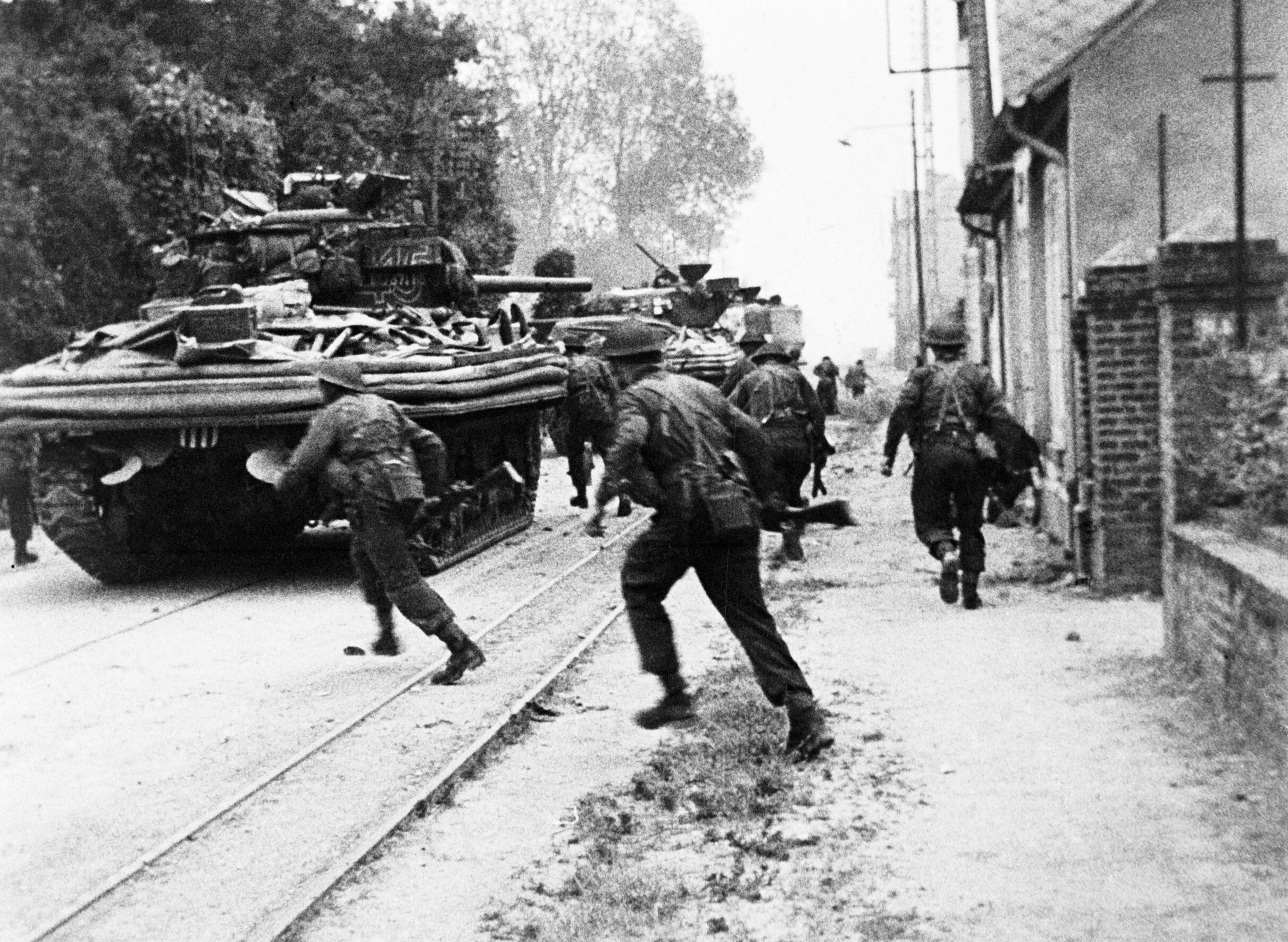
Commandos engaged in house to house fighting with the Germans at Riva Bella, near Ouistreham

The French troops of 185 men in total landed on the left flank of Sword Beach during the second wave, of these only 144 managed to reach the assembly point half a mile inland. Their objective was the Riva Bella Casino in Ouistreham. When they reached the casino the lightly armed French commandos were unable to break into the fortified building and called upon a Centaur IV from the Royal Marines Armoured Support Group to assist and soon captured the position. (This assault on the casino was featured in the film The Longest Day, although the shooting location for Ouistreham was at the nearby village of Port-en-Bessin.) In another sector of the landings Working Corporal Peter Masters of No. 3 Troop attached to No. 6 Commando was ordered to walk down the main street of what seemed a deserted village. The intention was to draw fire and identify where the Germans were hiding. By the night of D Day 1st Special Service Brigade, including No. 10 (Inter-Allied) Commando elements had crossed the River Orne and were dug in guarding the left flank of the 6th Airborne Division.

For the next three months No. 3 Troop carried out patrols in advance of the British lines. These patrols were not without loss. The troop commander Captain Bryan Hilton-Jones was captured trying to lead resistance fighters through the lines. Some of the men captured would become prisoners of war while others were never heard of again. Hilton-Jones was later released from captivity by No. 46 (Royal Marine) Commando when they captured a German field hospital at Pont-l'Évêque.

By the time the Allies reached the River Seine the original 185 French troops, had been reduced to only 40 unwounded. The numbers in the French ranks were quickly filled by men who had started training as a new No. 7 French Troop using the number left vacant when the Yugoslav troop was disbanded.

In mid-1944 No. 2 Dutch Troop returned to Europe; their first mission on the European mainland was Operation Market Garden 17 September 1944. The troop was divided between the three parachute divisions, 12 men were assigned to 1st British Airborne Division, 11 were assigned to 82nd Airborne Division, Five were assigned to 101st Airborne Division and three were assigned to 1st Airborne Corps headquarters. Another five were assigned to 52nd (Lowland) Division, which was to have been flown into the area when Deelen Airport was captured; eventually they ended up in the Staff of 1st British Airborne Corps.

The Belgian No. 4 Troop had returned to England in June and were selected to capture the French island of Yeu, only to find during a reconnaissance that the Germans had already left. They moved to the European mainland and were attached to the 4th Commando Brigade for the amphibious assault on the island of Walcheren (Operation Infatuate).

The assault on Walcheren saw the largest concentration of No. 10 (Inter-Allied) Commando men since their formation parade in 1943. Under command Lieutenant Colonel Laycock the commando was deployed; Headquarters and a section from No. 3 Troop and No. 2 Dutch Troop with Headquarters 4th Commando Brigade. The French No. 2 and No. 8 troops with a section from No. 2 Dutch Troop with No. 4 Commando. While with No. 41 (Royal Marine) Commando were No. 4 Belgian and No. 5 Norwegian Troops. In December the new No. 7 French Troop having completed training joined the other two French Troops still serving with No.4 Commando.

=== 1945 ===
In January to March the three French troops carried out raids on the island of Schouwen-Duiveland to prevent the Germans using the island to mount operations against Antwerp. In February the Norwegian High Command requested No. 5 Norwegian Troop take part in the Liberation of Norway. The troop was transferred to the Norwegian Army at the end of April and then flown to Sweden dressed as civilians to join the Free Norwegian Brigade which was ready to cross the border if the German garrison refused to surrender.

The next major operation involving men from No. 10 (Inter-Allied) Commando was the crossing of the River Rhine (Operation Plunder) and then crossing the River Weser. The main commando force was 1st Commando Brigade with German-speaking men from No. 3 (X) Troop attached.

Also in 1945 two new Belgian troops had gone through the commando school and now formed No. 9 and No. 10 Troops. Together with No. 4 Troop they came under command 80th Anti-Aircraft Brigade to provide local security. No. 10 Belgian Troop went on to liberate Neuengamme concentration camp.

== Legacy ==
Memorial to the members of No.3 (X) Troop in Penhelig Park, Aberdyfi.

No. 10 (Inter-Allied) Commando was disbanded on 4 September 1945, after the end of the war, but many of No 3 Troop continued in sensitive and secret work in the occupation zone, tracking Nazi Resistance groups, war criminals and translating captured documents. At the same time the rest of the Army Commandos were also disbanded and the commando role was taken over by the Royal Marines. However the present day Parachute Regiment, Special Air Service and Special Boat Service can all trace their origins to the Army Commandos.

Of the Western nations represented in No. 10 (Inter-Allied) Commando only Norway did not develop a commando force. The French troops are the predecessors of the Naval commandos. The Dutch Troop are the predecessors of the Korps Commandotroepen, and the Belgian Troops are the predecessors of the Paracommando Brigade.

== Battle honours ==
The following battle honours were awarded to the British commandos during the Second World War.

- Adriatic
- Alethangyaw
- Aller
- Anzio
- Argenta Gap
- Burma 1943–45
- Crete
- Dieppe
- Dives Crossing
- Djebel Choucha
- Flushing
- Greece 1944–45
- Italy 1943–45
- Kangaw
- Landing at Porto San Venere
- Landing in Sicily
- Leese
- Litani
- Madagascar
- Middle East 1941, 1942, 1944
- Monte Ornito
- Myebon
- Normandy Landing
- North Africa 1941–43
- North-West Europe 1942, 1944–1945
- Norway 1941
- Pursuit to Messina
- Rhine
- St. Nazaire
- Salerno
- Sedjenane 1
- Sicily 1943
- Steamroller Farm
- Syria 1941
- Termoli
- Vaagso
- Valli di Comacchio
- Westkapelle
