= No. 12 Commando =

- Active: 1940–1943
- Country: United Kingdom
- Branch: British Army
- Type: Commando
- Role: Raiding
- Size: 250 officers and men
- Part of: Special Service Brigade
- Engagements: Second World War: Operation Chess; Operation Kitbag; Operation Anklet; Operation Biting; Operation Brandy; Operation Chariot; Operation Aflame; Operation Basalt; Operation Fahrenheit; Operation Batman; Operation Cartoon; Operation Crackers; Operation Roundabout; Operation Carey; Operation Forfar; Operation Hardtack

Insignia
- Combined Operations Shoulder Patch

No. 12 Commando was a battalion-sized commando unit of the British Army during the Second World War. Formed in 1940 in Northern Ireland, they carried out a number of small-scale raids in Norway and France between 1941 and 1943 before being disbanded and its personnel dispersed to other commando units.

== Background ==
The commandos were formed in 1940, by the order of Winston Churchill the British Prime Minister. He called for specially trained troops that would "develop a reign of terror down the enemy coast". At first they were a small force of volunteers who carried out small raids against enemy occupied territory, but by 1943 their role had changed into lightly equipped assault infantry which specialised in spearheading amphibious landings.

The man initially selected as the overall commander of the force was Admiral Sir Roger Keyes himself a veteran of the landings at Galipoli and the Zeebrugge raid in the First World War. Keyes resigned in October 1941 and was replaced by Admiral Louis Mountbatten.

By the autumn of 1940 more than 2,000 men had volunteered for commando training, and what became known as the Special Service Brigade was formed into 12 units called commandos. Each commando would number around 450 men commanded by a lieutenant colonel. They were sub divided into troops of 75 men and further divided into 15-man sections. Commandos were all volunteers seconded from other British Army regiments and retained their own cap badges and remained on their regimental roll for pay. All volunteers went through the six-week intensive commando course at Achnacarry. The course in the Scottish Highlands concentrated on fitness, speed marches, weapons training, map reading, climbing, small boat operations and demolitions both by day and by night.

By 1943 the commandos had moved away from small raiding operations and had been formed into brigades of assault infantry to spearhead future Allied landing operations. Three units were left un-brigaded to carry out smaller-scale raids.

== History ==
=== Formation ===
Formed on 5 August 1940 at Crumlin after gathering in Belfast and Derry in Northern Ireland, under the command of Lieutenant Colonel S. Harrison, the unit, although technically a part of the Special Service Brigade under Brigadier Joseph (Charles) Haydon, largely remained independent of it and carried out small scale raiding and sabotage operations. The new unit was drawn from Irish regiments and from the 53rd and 61st Divisions which were based in Northern Ireland at the time. Training was conducted at various locations in Northern Ireland, including at Aldergrove Airport, where the commandos carried out a mock attack. In early 1941 they were billeted for a brief time at Warsash before undertaking combined operations training at Inverary, Scotland.

=== Operations ===
Compared with some of the other commando units, No. 12 Commando had a short history. Its first raid came on the night of 27/28 July 1941 when a party of 16 men carried out a landing near Ambleteuse, France. Embarking on an assault landing craft, they were towed to a position 2 miles (3.2 km) from the mouth of the Slack River by a Motor Launch. Although no prisoners were taken, the raid was partially successful and the commandos were ashore for approximately an hour before returning to their landing craft and heading back to Britain.

On 9 December 1941, a detachment from No. 12 Commando, along with a detachment from No. 6 Commando and some Norwegian soldiers, took part in Operation Kitbag, a raid on the town of Florø in Norway. Embarking on HMS Prince Charles, an infantry landing ship, they set out from Scapa Flow. During the voyage an incident occurred while some of the men were priming grenades for the raid which resulted in six men were killed and another 11 were seriously wounded, nevertheless the decision was made to continue with the raid. In the end, however, due to navigational difficulties the operation was eventually called off when the naval commander was unable to locate the fjord upon which Floss was located.

Later that month, on 26 December 1941, No. 12 Commando took part in Operation Anklet, which was the only raid it undertook during its history where the entire unit took part. The operation was a diversionary raid on the Lofoten Islands in Norway, as part of the wider Operation Archery, which was a larger commando raid on Vågsøy and Måløy. No. 12 Commando along with 68 Norwegians from Norwegian Independent Company 1 and a demolition party landed on the island capturing the German garrison who surrendered without a fight. Under Harrison's command, they landed at Reine and after the garrison surrendered, the commandos stayed on the island for two days to carry out demolitions work, destroying two German wireless stations before withdrawing. They took 29 German prisoners and over 200 volunteers for the free Norwegian forces in Britain with them.

After this No. 12 Commando undertook a series of small scale operations, with half of the unit forming Northforce in Norway, while the other half carried out operations in France along with the Small Scale Raiding Force as part of Forfarforce. On 27/28 February 1942, a detachment took part in the Bruneval Raid, providing the recovery parties for the paratroops. Later other detachments took part in the St Nazaire Raid and a raid on Sark known as Operation Basalt. In total the commando played a part in at least 15 raids between 1941 and late 1943.

=== Disbandment ===
The decision was finally made to disband the unit in December 1943 as part of the re-organisation of the commandos into four brigades underneath the divisional-sized commando Group HQ and the subsequent conceptual change in emphasis from small-scale raiding towards that of larger-scale infantry operations in which the commandos were treated as highly trained infantry instead of raiders. In addition to this, the losses suffered by the commando units serving in North Africa and Italy needed to be replaced. At the time there were widespread shortages across the entire British Army, and the volunteer nature of the commandos meant that there were even greater difficulties to replace commando losses. As a result, it was decided that some of these losses could be made up by disbanding No. 12 Commando.

Following the disbandment of the unit, many of the unit's personnel were transferred to other commando units, namely Nos. 1, 3, 5 and 6 Commandos.

== Battle honours ==
The following Battle honours were awarded to the British Commandos during the Second World War.

- Adriatic
- Alethangyaw
- Aller
- Anzio
- Argenta Gap
- Burma 1943–45
- Crete
- Dieppe
- Dives Crossing
- Djebel Choucha
- Flushing
- Greece 1944–45
- Italy 1943–45
- Kangaw
- Landing at Porto San Venere
- Landing in Sicily
- Leese
- Litani
- Madagascar
- Middle East 1941, 1942, 1944
- Monte Ornito
- Myebon
- Normandy Landing
- North Africa 1941–43
- North-West Europe 1942, 1944–1945
- Norway 1941
- Pursuit to Messina
- Rhine
- St. Nazaire
- Salerno
- Sedjenane 1
- Sicily 1943
- Steamroller Farm
- Syria 1941
- Termoli
- Vaagso
- Valli di Comacchio
- Westkapelle
