= Fusiliers Commandos de l'Air =

Ground-combat and security element of the French Air Force

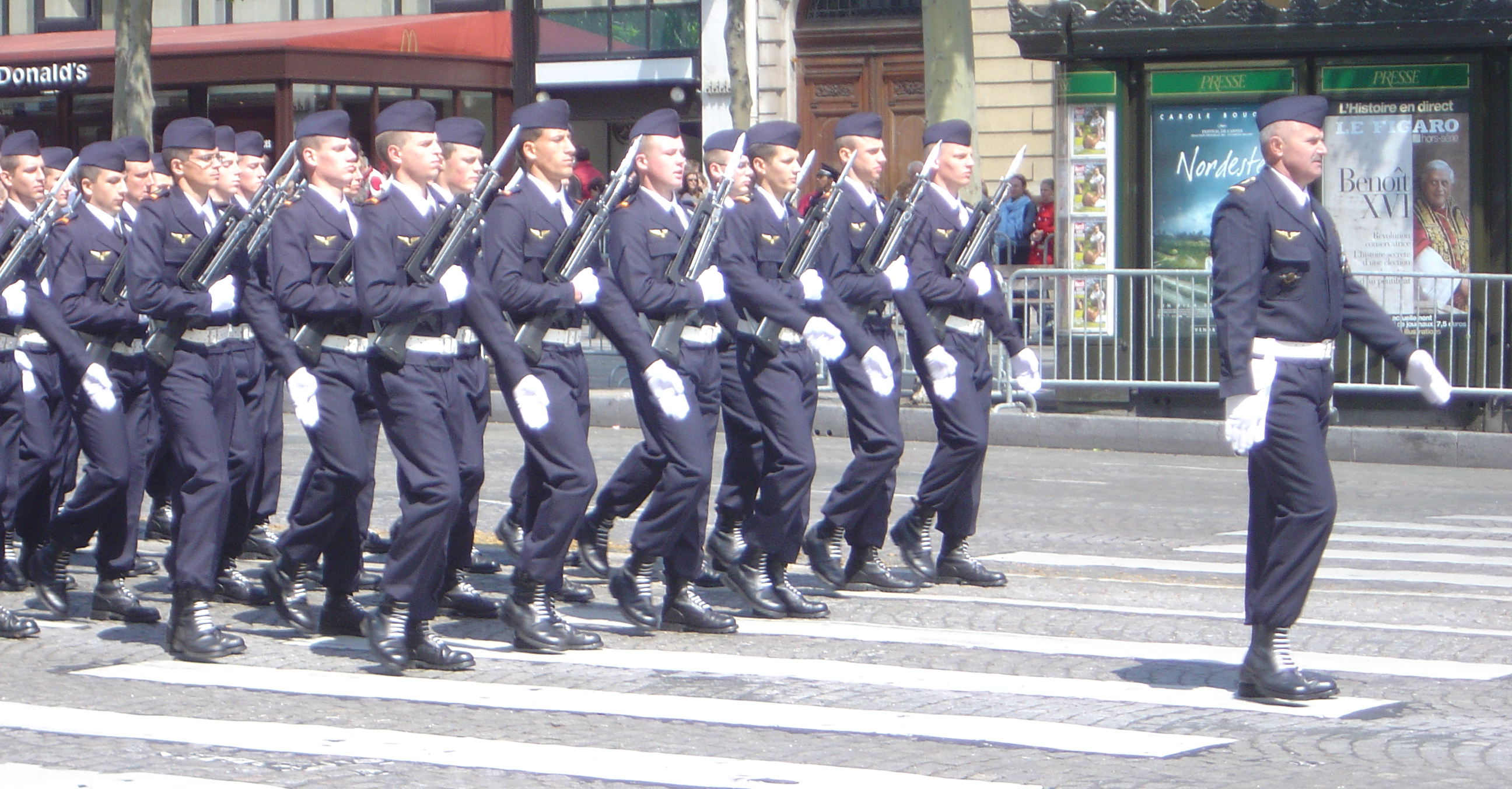
Fusiliers de l'air on the Champs-Élysées on the 60th anniversary of VE day

The Fusiliers Commandos de l'Air (English: Fusilier Commandos of the Air Force) of the French Air and Space Force are equivalent to the United Kingdom's RAF Regiment, German Air Force Regiment or the United States Air Force Security Forces. They are airmen armed and trained as infantry, who provide ground defense of air bases and secure forward base areas. They also participate in forward air control, combat search and rescue missions, and as air assault ground soldiers.

== Algerian War ==
During the Algerian War, the Air Force deployed its own Fusiliers de l'Air ground regiments, which used the traditional French half-brigades (démi-brigades) unit type. They were formed between September 1955 and June 1956, relying heavily on officers and NCOs posted from the Army. These units were subordinated to the three GATACs. The infantry units of the Air Force were transferred to the Army by the end of 1957.

- 531e demi-brigade des fusiliers de l'air - based in Arba, Algiers sector
- 532e demi-brigade des fusiliers de l'air - based in Saint-Denis du Sig, Oran sector
- 533e demi-brigade des fusiliers de l'air - based in La Chiffa, Algiers sector
- 541e demi-brigade des fusiliers de l'air - based in the Souk Ahras region, Constantine sector, the battalions were dispersed in 71 détachements in a rectangular area of 70 km by 40 km
- 542e demi-brigade des fusiliers de l'air - based in Guelma, Constantine sector
- 543e demi-brigade des fusiliers de l'air - based in Aïn Beïda, Sahara
- 544e demi-brigade des fusiliers de l'air - initially formed in Tunisia, relocated to Algeria on October 10, 1956
- 545e demi-brigade des fusiliers de l'air - initially formed in Tunisia, relocated to Algeria on October 10, 1956
- 546e demi-brigade des fusiliers de l'air - based in Alma at the foothills of the Blida Atlas mountains
- 547e demi-brigade des fusiliers de l'air - based in El Biar, Algiers sector

The command elements of the half-brigades (Unités à administration distincte (UAD)) actually belonged to the 5th Air Force Region's territorial administrative center (Centre administratif territorial de l'air (CATA) 860) in Blida and were attached to the infantry units.

The elite Parachute Commandos were retained at the central level of the 5th Air Force Region.

- Groupement des commandos parachutistes de l'air 00/541 (GCPA) - the groupment included four combat units and one support unit, all called 'commandos':
  - Commando de l'air 10/541 « Martel » (forerunner of today's commando parachutiste de l'air n° 10)
  - Commando de l'air 20/541 « Manoir » (forerunner of today's commando parachutiste de l'air n° 20)
  - Commando de l'air 30/541 « Maquis » formed by personnel from the Air Force units in Morocco (forerunner of today's commando parachutiste de l'air n° 30)
  - Commando de l'air 40/541 « Maxime »

Each combat commando had an established strength of 102 men (5 officers, 22 NCOs and 75 ranks), but in the course of the war it could occasionally increase up to 180 men. The building block of the units was the Team (équipe) of five or six men. A Commando Group (groupe de commando) combined two teams for a total of 10 - 12 men, transportable by a single H-34 or two H-19 helicopters. A Commando Platoon (section de commando) combined two commando groups (total of four teams): two Command and Fire Teams (deux équipes de commandement et de feu) and two regular commando teams (deux équipes simples de commandos).

  - Commando de l'air 50/541 - was the logistical support unit. The GCPA included a Separate Administrative Unit (unité à administration distincte (UAD)) of 55 men. On May 1, 1957 the UAD absorbed the logistical personnel from Commando de l'air 50/541 and formed the HQ of the formation - GCPA 00/541 « Norpois ». The latter unit was repurposed as a combat commando.

Two experimental commandos of reduced strength were added later:

- Commando expérimental « Chouf »
- Commando expérimental « Matou »

Due to their active involvement in the Algiers putsch of 1961 at the end of April all four were disbanded effective immediately. To fill up the void on May 1 two new units were formed at the BA 146 Reghaia air base:

- compagnie de commandos parachutistes de l'air no 30.541
- compagnie de commandos parachutistes de l'air no 50.541

These units discarded the commando nomenclature in order to break with the previous units and the reason for their disbandment. The new companies also differed in their established structure with a strength of 5 officers, 33 NCOs and 100 ranks each.

== Structure ==
The Fusiliers-Commando units are part of the Intervention and Security Force Brigade (Brigade aérienne des forces de sécurité et d'intervention).

=== Air Commando Training Squadron ===
The Air Commando Training Squadron (escadron d'instruction des commandos de l'air) is a training unit, founded in 1974, manages four different courses;

- Air Fusilier course (brevet de fusilier de l'air) : basic formation for Other Ranks in Protective Squadrons.
- Air Parachute Fusilier course (brevet de fusilier-parachutiste de l'air) : second-level formation for all ranks. It includes parachute training.
- Air Parachute Commando course (brevet de commando-parachutiste de l'air) : third level formation for all ranks. Upon its successful completion, airmen can petition to enter Air Parachute Commando n° 20 and 30.
- Air Special Forces Commando course (brevet de commando des forces spéciales air) : fourth and final level. Upon its successful completion, airmen can petition to enter Air Parachute Commando n° 10.

=== Protective Squadrons ===
The protective squadrons (escadrons de protection) are responsible for the protection of defense-sensitive points of Air and Space Force bases, intervention in the context of overseas operations or special missions, and participation in tasks assigned to Special Operations Command. They are employed in unit protection or intervention. The 34 Protective Squadrons man patrols to deter, detect and intervene to neutralize and delay, by force if necessary, any malicious act against facilities of the Air and Space Force, air bases on the mainland (Dijon, Saint-Dizier, Luxeuil, Nancy, Drachenbronn, Évreux, Villacoublay, Orleans, Avord, Tours, Creil, Brest, Mont-de-Marsan, Cazaux, Cognac, Orange, Istres, Solenzara, Lyon, Paris) and on external sites (Chad, Afghanistan, Tajikistan, Djibouti, United Arab Emirates, French Guiana, Reunion, New Caledonia, etc.).

=== Air Parachute Commandos ===
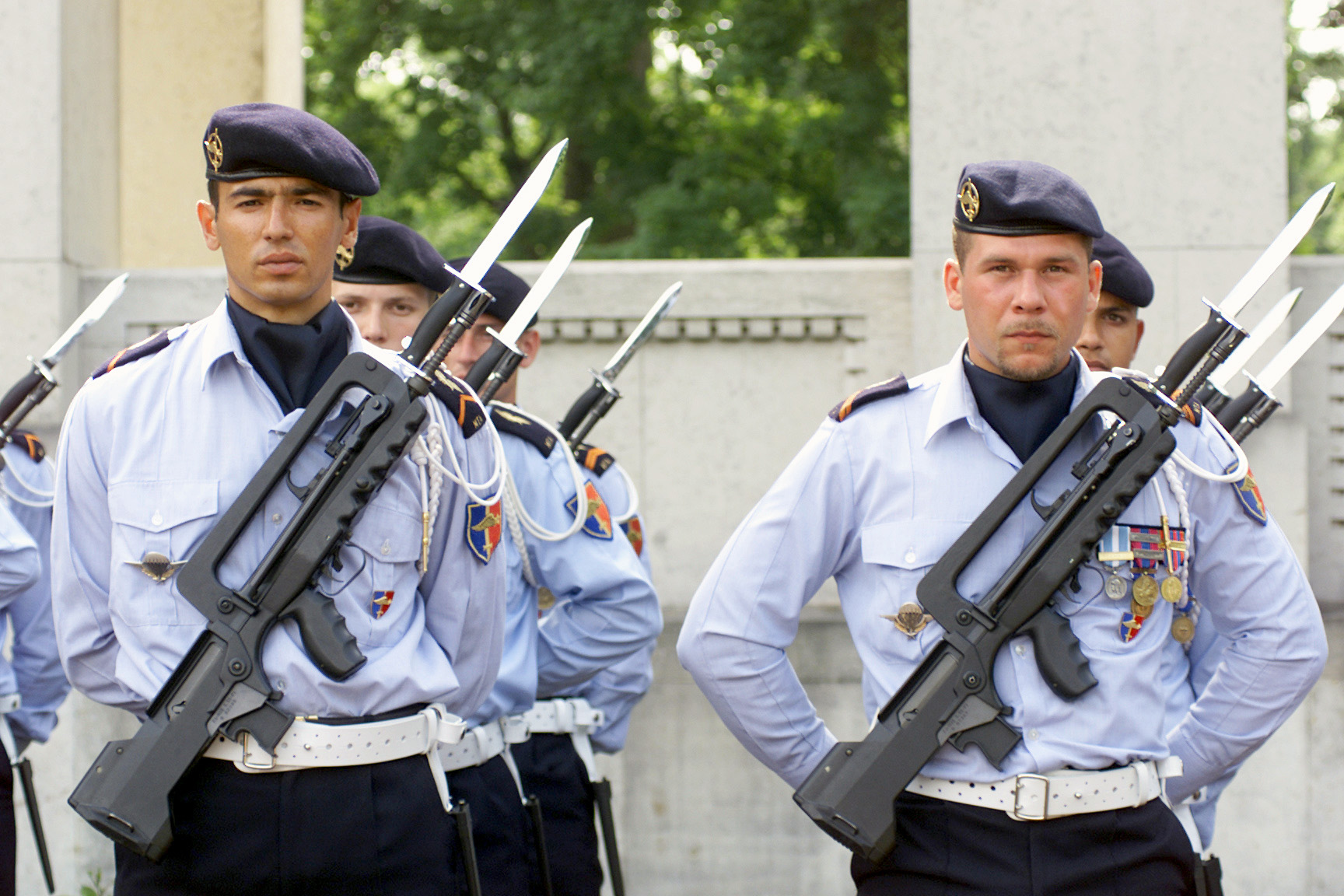
Members of the n° 20 Commando during the Memorial Day ceremony at the LaFayette Escadrille Monument in Paris, France

The three Air Parachute Commandos (commandos parachutistes de l'air) fulfil specific missions requiring advanced training and specialities.

==== Air Parachute Commando n° 10 ====
The Commando n° 10 is a special forces unit used for airport seizures, high value target (HVT) neutralization, and counter terrorism. The CPA 10 is under the umbrella of the Commandement des opérations spéciales.

==== Air Parachute Commando n° 20 ====
The main missions of Commando n° 20 is long-range protective patrols in armored cars, protection from potential low-level air attacks in helicopters and forward air control.

==== Air Parachute Commando n°30 ====
The main missions of Commando n° 30 are combat search and rescue and military dog use.

== See also ==
- List of French paratrooper units
- Algerian War French order of battle
