= Sokoto hostage rescue attempt =

Attempted rescue of British hostages

- Part of the Boko Haram insurgency
Date	8 March 2012
Location	Sokoto, Nigeria
Result	Rescue attempt failed: Hostages killed

Belligerents
United Kingdom; Nigeria	Al Qaeda

Units involved
Special Boat Service	Boko Haram

Strength
(United Kingdom) 6–20 commandos (Nigeria) 100+ soldiers	Unknown

Casualties and losses
2 hostages executed	8 killed, 2–3 arrested

On 8 March 2012, members of the British military Special Boat Service, supported by members of the Nigerian Army, attempted a rescue mission to rescue British hostage Chris McManus and Italian hostage Franco Lamolinara from Boko Haram, supported by Al Qaeda, in Sokoto in north-west Nigeria. The mission failed when both hostages were executed by their captors.

== Background ==
Chris McManus, 28, from Oldham, Greater Manchester, was a British contract worker for Italian construction company B Stabilini. He was kidnapped on 12 May 2011 in a raid by militants from his apartment in Birnin-Kebbi, along with an Italian colleague Franco Lamolinara, from Gattinara, Piedmont, who also worked for B Stabilini. In August 2011 the kidnappers released a hostage video to a Mauritian news agency, threatening to kill McManus and Lamolinara unless demands were met.

They were kidnapped by militants calling themselves "al-Qaida in the land beyond the Sahil". British and Nigerian officials and news sources stated that they were members of Boko Haram backed by Al Qaeda, and that they had received training in Niger from al Qaeda in the Maghreb. The militants' demands changed frequently; they wanted the Nigerian government to release prisoners, but kept changing specific prisoners they wanted released.

== Intelligence ==
Following the kidnapping, British authorities worked closely with Nigerian authorities to find the hostages.

On 6 March 2012, Nigerian security agencies arrested Abu Mohammed, the factional leader of Boko haram, and 4 other members of the sect. They showed the security agencies the compound in the Mabera neighbourhood of Sokoto where the hostages were located and raised concern that the hostages might be killed if the security agencies did not move quickly to free the hostages. Also, an intercepted phone call from the militants suggested that they were going to move and execute the hostages after they suspected something was wrong due to their leader and the four others being missing.

The COBR committee met to monitor the situation. GCHQ monitored phone calls and used satellite technology to confirm their location and passed on the intelligence to the Director of Special Forces, who in turn passed it to the SBS commander in Nigeria. On the morning of 8 March 2012, David Cameron authorised the emergency rescue mission after being informed of the location of the hostages.

The Italian government was not informed of the rescue mission until it was underway.

== Mission ==
Personnel from the British Special Boat Service (SBS), supported by their counterparts in the Nigerian Army, launched the operation to free the hostages at 10am Greenwich Mean Time. The SBS Squadron, which had been in the country for up to two weeks, could not use helicopters to assault the building for fear of alerting the kidnappers. Instead, they were transported to the target building in Nigerian vehicles. Some news reports put the number of SBS troops who carried out the raid at six to eight, whilst others put the number at 16 to 20. In the brief assault, a Nigerian Army APC rammed the gates of the target compound, and the SBS stormed the building and killed two militants, whilst Nigerian troops killed a further six militants. The bodies of McManus and Lamolinara were found, and a later autopsy revealed that they had been hastily executed at close range.

== Aftermath ==
Following the raid, gunfire continued into the night and a further two or three militants were arrested. The raid strained relations between the United Kingdom and Italy, and the Italian government demanded an explanation from British government as to why it was not informed about the rescue attempt. Italy's prime minister asked the Nigerian government for a detailed reconstruction of the events leading to the hostages' death.

== See also ==
- Bulo Marer hostage rescue attempt
- Burkina Faso hostage rescue
- 2020 Nigeria hostage rescue
