= 2020 Nigeria hostage rescue =

United States Navy SEALs rescue operation

- Part of Nigerian bandit conflict
Date	October 31, 2020
Location	Northern Nigeria
Result	Mission success: Hostage rescued

Belligerents
United States; Supported by: Nigeria; Niger	Gunmen

Units involved
Joint Special Operations Command: DEVGRU; United States Air Force: Air Force Special Operations Command; 352d Special Operations Wing; 100th Air Refueling Wing; Pre mission intelligence and support: Central Intelligence Agency; Marine Corps Special Operations Command	Unknown

Strength
c. 30 Navy SEALs and special operations personnel Aircraft: 1 AC-130J Ghostrider gunship aircraft; 2 CV-22B Osprey tiltrotor aircraft; 1 C-17A Globemaster III transport aircraft; 1 KC-135R Stratotanker aerial refueling aircraft; 1 MC-130J Commando II special mission aircraft; 1 P-8A Poseidon maritime patrol aircraft; 1 Gulfstream V aircraft	7 gunmen

Casualties and losses
None	6 killed

During the early hours of October 31, 2020, United States Navy SEALs from the SEAL Team Six Silver squadron conducted an operation in Northern Nigeria, resulting in the rescue of an American hostage and the killing of six of the seven captors. The hostage, 27-year-old Philip Walton, had been kidnapped in front of his family at his home in the village of Massalata in neighboring Niger on October 26 by gunmen, who intended to sell him to armed terrorist groups in the area.

== Background ==
In 2020, Niger experienced a multitude of attacks by extremists linked to both Islamic State (IS) groups and al-Qaeda. About two months prior to the kidnapping of Walton, IS-linked militants killed six French aid workers and their Niger guide while they were visiting a wildlife park near the capital Niamey. Additionally, American aid worker Jeffery Woodke was kidnapped from Abalak in October 2016, and was believed to have been held in Mali before his release on March 20, 2023.

Philip Walton is an American citizen and the son of missionaries, who has lived in Massalata with his wife and child for two years. His father lives in Birni-N'konni, and has lived in Niger for about 30 years.

== Kidnapping and rescue ==
Walton was kidnapped by six men armed with Kalashnikovs from his farm in Massalata in southern Niger in the early morning of October 27, 2020. The kidnappers initially demanded money from Walton, but abducted him after he was only able to offer US$40. The kidnappers then demanded a US$1 million ransom from Walton's father via a phone call.

The Nigerien Interior Ministry announced the incident via a statement read on national radio, which claimed that the kidnappers had searched Walton's home before fleeing with him. The country sent additional security reinforcements to the area and began efforts with the United States to secure the release of Walton.

On October 31, 2020, operatives from the Naval Special Warfare Development Group, known as SEAL Team Six, rescued Philip Walton in a night-time raid that killed six of the seven gunmen. The rescue force, consisting of around 30 operatives, was inserted into the area via parachute from Air Force Special Operations aircraft of the 352nd Special Operations Wing. Once on the ground, they moved on foot for about three miles (five kilometers) to the site where Walton was held. After a short but intense firefight, Walton was moved to an extraction point, where he and the rescue force were flown out of the area.

The rescue operation involved the governments of Niger and Nigeria working together with the United States. According to a former U.S. official speaking on the operation, the CIA provided intelligence on Walton's location and elements of Marine Special Operations Command helped locate him.

Officials from the US Department of Defense and US Department of State have not linked the kidnappers to any terrorist organization.

=== Aircraft involved ===
The Navy SEALs were flown to and out of the area via CV-22B and MC-130J Commando II special operations aircraft, with one AC-130J Ghostrider gunship to provide air support. The aircraft belonged to the 352nd Special Operations Wing, which were supported by five KC-135 Stratotankers of the 100th Air Refueling Wing, both based out of RAF Mildenhall. One Navy P-8A Poseidon maritime patrol plane also took part in the operation. The aircraft were forward-positioned at Naval Station Rota in Southwest Spain before flying more than 2,000 mi (3,200 km) to Nigeria.

== Reaction ==
A statement put out by Pentagon chief spokesperson Jonathan Hoffman stated "U.S. forces conducted a hostage rescue operation during the early hours of 31 October in Northern Nigeria to recover an American citizen held hostage by a group of armed men. This American citizen is safe and is now in the care of the U.S. Department of State. No U.S military personnel were injured during the operation. We appreciate the support of our international partners in conducting this operation."

US president Donald Trump hailed the operation and the rescue team on Twitter, where he said that the operation was a "big win for our very elite U.S. Special Forces" and added "[...] we got our young man back." Trump also referenced the rescue at a campaign speech in Pennsylvania, stating, "The kidnappers wished they had never done it." and "...we got our young man back."

White House press secretary Kayleigh McEnany spoke on Fox & Friends about the rescue and stated that the president prioritizes the safety of American citizens.

US secretary of state Mike Pompeo described the operation as "outstanding." In 2021, The New Yorker claimed that Pompeo was initially hesitant to provide support to the mission.

== See also ==
- list of operations conducted by SEAL Team Six
- Bulo Marer hostage rescue attempt – 2013 French military operation against Islamist group al-Shabaab in Somalia
- Burkina Faso hostage rescue – French rescue operation in West Africa
- Rescue of Jessica Buchanan and Poul Hagen Thisted – 2012 US special forces raid in Somalia
- Sokoto hostage rescue attempt – Attempted rescue of British hostages
- 2025 United States strikes in Nigeria
- Killing of Abu-Bilal al-Minuki
