= Green beret =

Military headdress

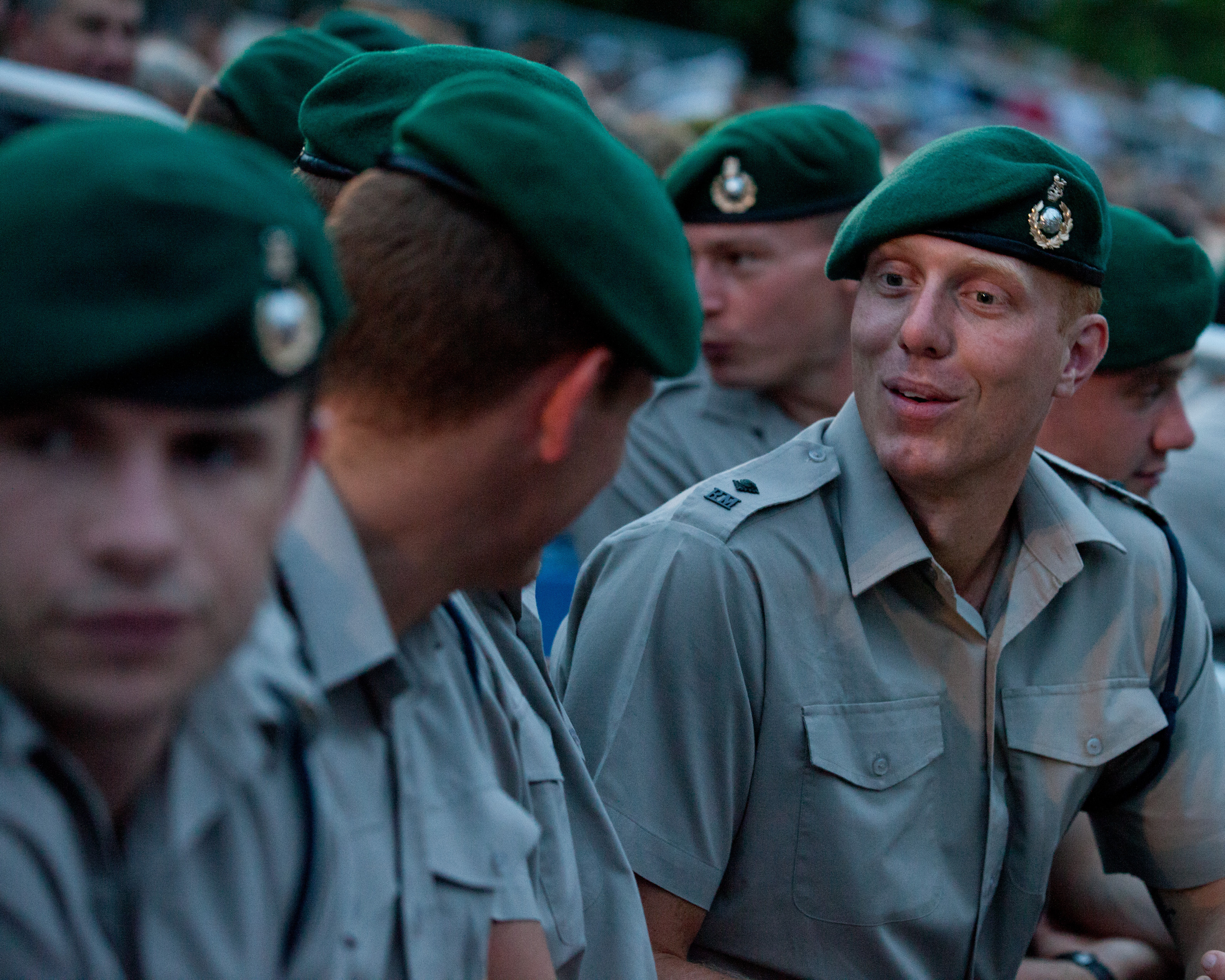
British Royal Marines wearing green berets

The green beret is a form of headdress in use by a number of militaries worldwide, primarily by those with commando and or special operations backgrounds. It was the official headgear of the British Commandos, a special-forces unit active during World War II and is still worn by members of the Royal Marines after passing the Commando Course, and personnel from other units of the Royal Navy, Army and RAF who serve within UK Commando Force and who have passed the All Arms Commando Course. Green berets are similarly the official beret color of the United States Army Special Forces, and source of their autonymous moniker "The Green Berets".

There are certain other military organizations that also wear the green beret because they have regimental or unit histories that have a connection with the British Commandos. These include the Australian, French and Dutch commandos. It is the norm in the armed forces of the Commonwealth Nations, where most regiments wear headdresses and cap badges which reflect regimental history and traditions.

== Origins ==
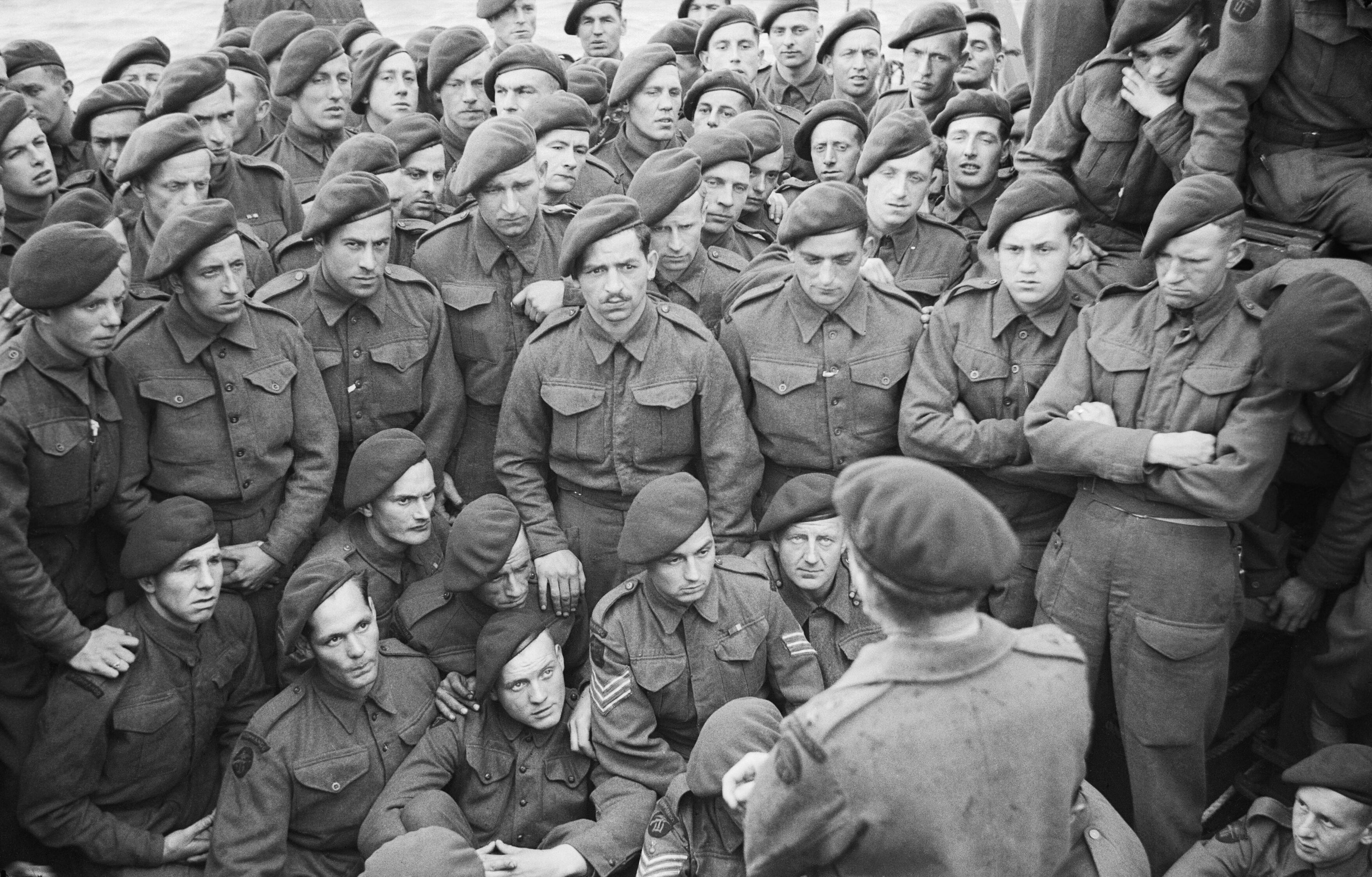
Men of No. 4 Commando in berets, being briefed before the Normandy landings in 1944

Initially, those who joined the British Commandos kept their parent regimental headdress and cap badges. In 1941, No. 1 Commando had no fewer than 79 different cap badges and many different forms of headdress. "Thus a motley collection of caps, Tam o' Shanters, bonnets, forage caps, caps 'fore and aft', berets, peaked KD caps, etc., appeared on the Commando parades," says Captain Oakley, "the forest being a veritable RSM's nightmare!"

No. 2 Commando and No. 9 Commando faced with the same problem had adopted the Tam o' Shanter, but, as a traditional Scottish headdress, this was not considered suitable for what was a British unit. After some discussion it was agreed that if No. 1 Commando was to adopt a uniformed headdress then the beret, which had been worn by the Tank Regiment since the First World War (and had recently been adopted by the Parachute Regiment), would meet the requirements: it had no British regional affinity, it was difficult to wear improperly, and it could be easily stowed away without damage (when for example tin hats were in use).

Having decided on the headdress, the next question to be resolved was the colour. The shoulder insignia of No. 1 Commando had been designed by the Richmond Herald at the College of Arms. It incorporated three colours in its design of a green salamander going through fire: red, yellow and green. Green was chosen as the most suitable. A Scottish firm of tam-o-shanter makers in Irvine (Ayrshire) was chosen to design and manufacture the beret.

Once the design was agreed, Brigadier Robert Laycock was approached by No. 1 Commando to seek his permission to wear it. He had been pondering on what the commandos should use for their headdress, and welcomed the green beret as a chance to introduce it as standard for all commandos formations, with No. 1 Commando being the first to don them.

The proposal that the commandos should start wearing green beret as their official headdress was submitted to the Chief of Combined Operations and forwarded by Lord Louis Mountbatten to the Under-Secretary of State for War. Approval was granted and in October 1942 the first green berets were issued to the Royal Marines.

== Australian Army ==
Australian Commando berets are known as being "Sherwood Green" in colour. The corps badge on the beret is a black background and a gold combat dagger with the motto "Foras Admonitio" meaning "Without Warning" across the dagger. Note: 1st commando corps badge is a WW2 style silver dagger through a gold boomerang, with the motto “Strike Swiftly”. The green beret is only awarded to a soldier upon becoming qualified as a Commando in either of the below regiments.

- 1st Commando Regiment
- 2nd Commando Regiment. Formerly 4th Battalion, Royal Australian Regiment, a special forces unit of the Australian Army

The Royal Australian Regiment also wears a "Rifle Green" Beret. The regiment's badge or "Skippy Badge" is a gold kangaroo and a wattle wreath with the motto "Duty First".

- 2nd Battalion, Royal Australian Regiment
- 3rd Battalion, Royal Australian Regiment
- 5/7th Battalion, Royal Australian Regiment
- 6th Battalion, Royal Australian Regiment

== Belgian paracommandos ==
Consisting of two battalions within the light brigade, only the 2nd Commando Battalion inherited the green beret along with other traditions from the 4th Troop of No.10 Commando. These paracommandos are the only "green berets" that are no longer a special operations force, but are considered to be elite. However, the Belgian special forces usually only recruits from paracommandos.

== Canadian Army ==
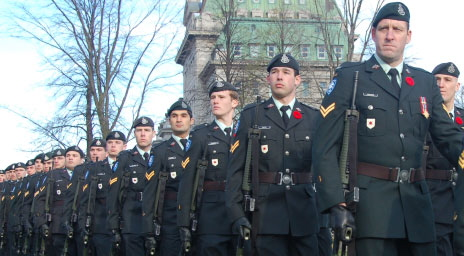
Canadian Army personnel marching in No. 1 Ceremonial Dress

The green beret is the standard headdress for the Canadian Army. It is worn with service and operational dresses by all personnel not otherwise authorized to wear beret in any other color.

== Dutch commandos ==
The Special Forces of the Netherlands consist mainly of the Korps Commandotroepen (KCT). Their motto is "Nunc aut Nunquam" which is Latin for "Now or Never". The roots of the KCT go back to World War II. Under the name No. 2 (Dutch) Troop, the first Dutch commandos were trained in Achnacarry, Scotland, as part of No. 10 (Inter-Allied) Commando. The unit was formed on March 22, 1942, the birthday of the present KCT.

Members of the Royal Netherlands Marine Corps also receive upon completion of the Commando Course a green beret, but with the gold anchor on a red background.

== Finnish Coastal Jaegers ==
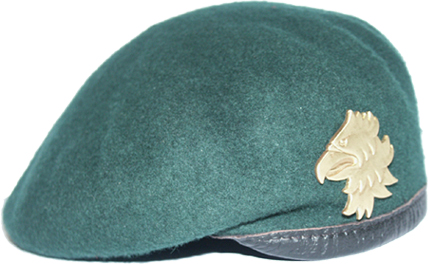
Finnish Coastal Jaegers' green beret

The Finnish Coastal Jaegers primary role is to conduct counterattacks against enemy landings in the Finnish archipelago, an environment known for small islands and skerries. Jaegers can function independently or with the support of artillery units, including light or heavy mortars. A number of Coastal Jaeger troops receive training for unconventional warfare and reconnaissance behind enemy lines.

The right to wear the green beret must be earned & can be lost as a punishment.

== French Navy Commandos ==
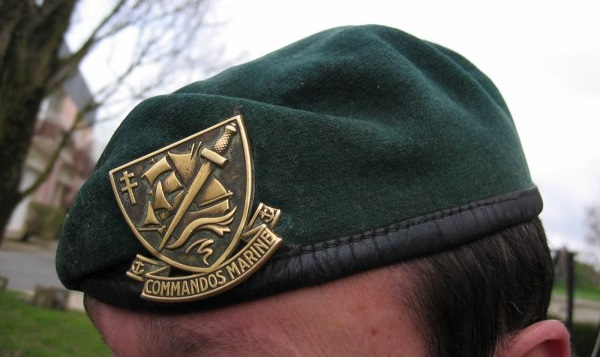
Commandos Marine beret

The Commandos Marine, nicknamed bérets verts ("green berets"), are the special operations forces unit of the French Navy. The unit traces its origins back to the United Kingdom during the Second World War when Free French volunteers trained and later fought alongside British commandos. In 1946, the 1er Bataillon de Fusiliers Marins Commandos became the Commandos Marine. The unit continues to wear the same green berets as the British Commandos. But they are worn pulled to the right (a unique case in the French Armed Forces) where berets are pulled to the left.

== French Foreign Legion ==
The French Foreign Legion regiments also notably wear a green beret. This tradition is not linked to the UK.

== Italian Navy's Special Forces ==
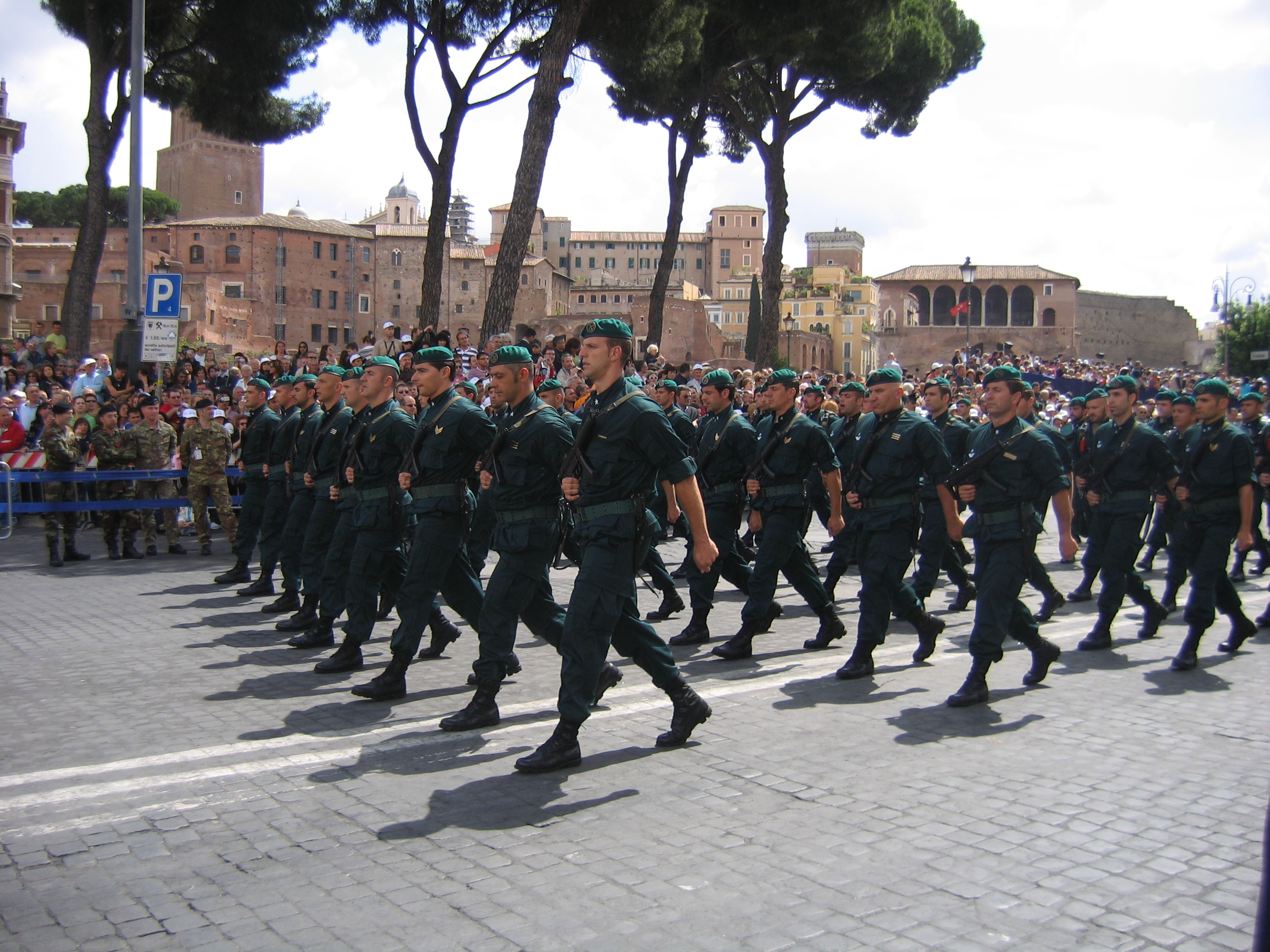
COMSUBIN berets on march

The COMSUBIN are the elite special operations unit of the Italian Navy. The Royal Italian Navy's Naval Assault Divisions is considered to be the precursor of modern Naval Special Forces. They are called baschi verdi (green berets).

== Lithuanian military ==
Green berets are worn by soldiers of most of the Lithuanian Armed Forces with exception of the Military Police, Navy, Air Force, the Volunteer Forces, SOF and the Engineer Battalion. In 1991 the need arose to distinguish between Iron Wolf brigade and other forces wearing black berets so their commander has chosen the green beret as a mark of special forces although later it became regular mechanized infantry.

== Mexican Army Special Forces Corps ==
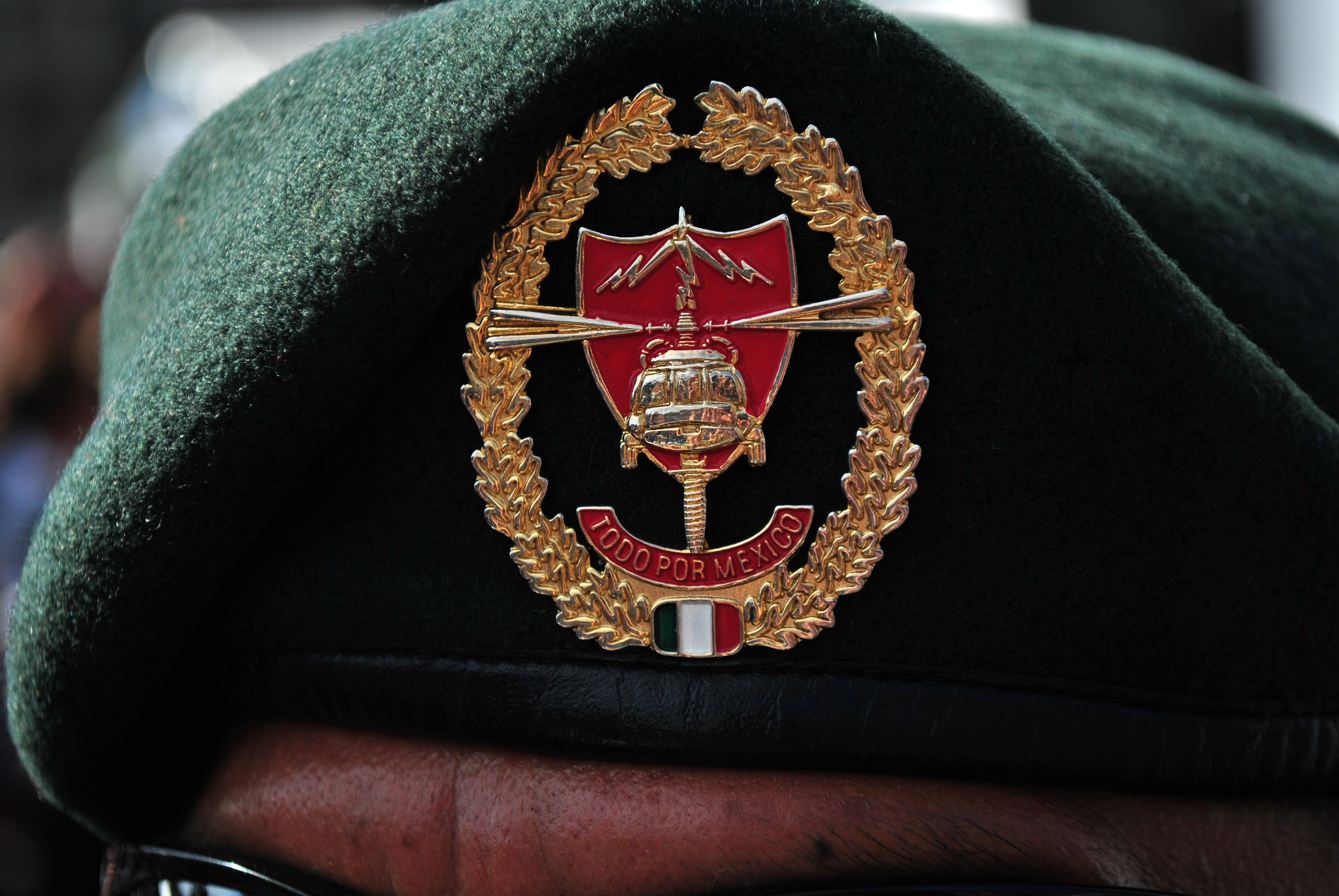
Official Cuerpo de Fuerzas Especiales green beret

The Mexican Army Special Forces nicknamed the COIFE, formerly the GAFE (Grupo Aeromóvil de Fuerzas Especiales), are a special operations unit of the Mexican Army. The COIFE adapted the green beret as their signature headgear, known as the boina verde (Spanish for green beret). The COIFE have received training from Israeli and American special forces. The COIFE have also played a key role against Mexican drug cartels during the on-going Mexican drug war. They are the Mexican Army's equivalent to the U.S. Army Special Forces.

== Paraguayan Cavalry (Chaco War) ==
The RC 1 "Cnel Valois Rivarola" was a renowned Paraguayan Cavalry Regiment during the Chaco War (1932-1935). The regiment earned the nickname "Los Diablos Verdes" (The Green Devils) from the enemy forces due to their ferocity and effectiveness in combat, including numerous assaults and breakthroughs. There are claims they were "Los Primeros Boinas Verdes del Mundo" (The First Green Berets in the World), referencing their distinctive headgear and elite status. Their gallantry in battles like Mandyjupecua, where they displayed extraordinary endurance despite harsh conditions, led to their distinction. The RC 1 "Cnel Valois Rivarola" became the only unit in the Paraguayan Army to receive the "Cruz del Chaco" (Cross of the Chaco) on the battlefield, a testament to their valor. President Eusebio Ayala and Mariscal José Félix Estigarribia personally condecorated the regiment's War Flag with the "Cruz del Chaco" in recognition of their collective gallantry, after the regimental commander, Mayor Eustacio Rojas Fernández, humbly declined the personal honor in favor of his unit.

== Portuguese Paratroopers ==
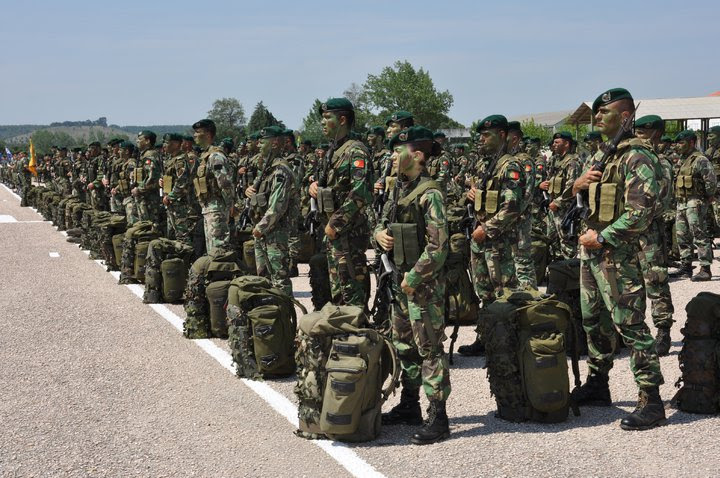
Portuguese Army Paratroopers

The Portuguese Paratroopers (Portuguese: Tropas Paraquedistas) are an elite infantry assault force, representing the bulk of the airborne forces of Portugal. They were created in 1955 as part of the Portuguese Air Force, being transferred to the Portuguese Army in 1993. Presently, most of the Paratroopers are part of the Portuguese Rapid Reaction Brigade which also includes the Commandos and the Special Operations forces.

In 1955, the Paratroopers were the first unit of the Portuguese Armed Forces to adopt a beret. Instead of the red beret, traditionally worn by most of the parachute units of the other Western countries, the then Portuguese minister of Defense Santos Costa opted for a green beret, allegedly because green was the color of the ink of the pen he used to sign his decrees. Because of that, the Portuguese Paratroopers are nicknamed Boinas Verdes ("Green Berets").

== Portuguese Special Operations (Army Rangers) ==
The unit members wear a moss/dry green beret and are the heir of the Special Hunters: the beret badge includes a hunting horn—a symbol of the Special Hunters; and the unit is known as Rangers because the first instructors of the Special Hunters completed the Ranger Course and adapted the characteristics of that training to the Special Operations Course. This special forces unit has operated in Bosnia and Herzegovina, East-Timor, Kosovo, Afghanistan, and Iraq.

== Royal Marine Commandos ==
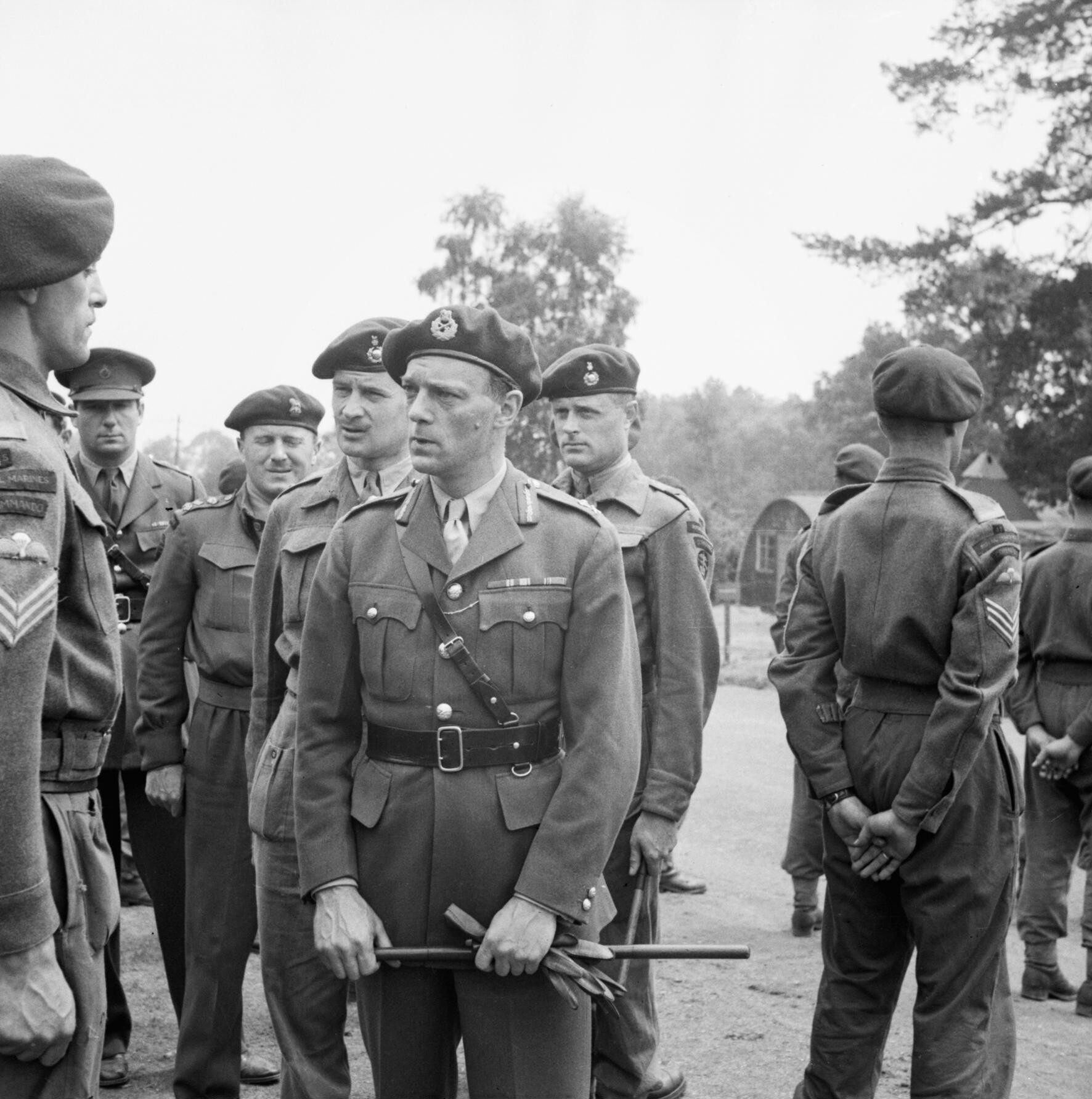
Major General Sir Robert Laycock, Chief of Combined Operations, talking to Marine Commandos during an inspection shortly before D Day, c. 1944

In the United Kingdom all Royal Marines who have passed the Commando Course wear the green beret. Personnel from the Royal Navy, British Army, and Royal Air Force volunteering for service with 3 Commando Brigade undertake the All Arms Commando Course, completion of which allows individuals to wear the headdress. Commando-qualified Royal Marines always wear the green beret, with the Globe and Laurel cap badge and commando-qualified personnel from other armed services wear the beret, with their own cap badge, when serving with commando units unless otherwise authorised. The Special Boat Service (SBS) also wear the green Commando beret but with their own cap badge consisting of a sword with two blue waved lines with the words "by strength and guile"

The Commando Badge of a Fairbairn-Sykes fighting knife on a triangular patch/badge is worn on the sleeve in perpetuity by all those who have passed the course.

== Russia ==
There are several organizations in Russia using Green berets.

- Light green - used first by Soviet Border Troops of the KGB, and then by Russian Border Troops of the FSB. Is worn with a green Telnyashka. Beret has a distinct emerald colour.
- Green - used by Federal Bailiffs Service since 2011. The colour is bright green.
- Dark green - used in different reconnaissance troops of different branches of military and security. In particular used by reconnaissance troops of Rosgvadiya.

== Spanish Special Operations ==
Army (Special Operations Command), Navy (Fuerza de Guerra Naval Especial, FGNS) and Air Force (Escuadrón de Zapadores Paracaidistas, EZAPAC) of Spain have their own special operations units, all wearing green berets with the unit badges.

Personnel attached to the MCOE (Mando Conjunto de Operaciones Especiales) (Joint Special Operations Command) wear a green beret with the badge of the joint three military branches.

== Thailand ==
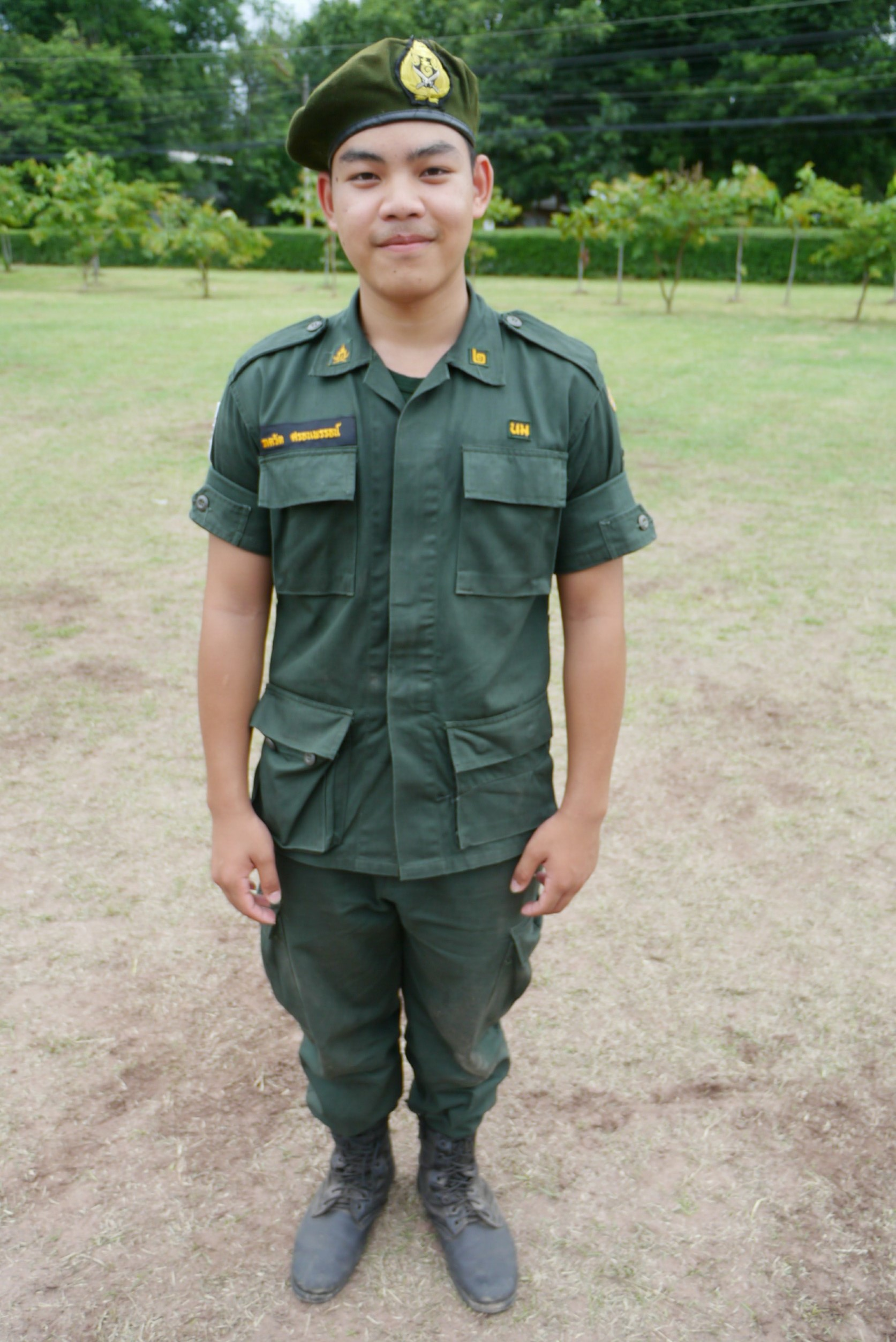
Territorial Defense Student with Khaki green beret

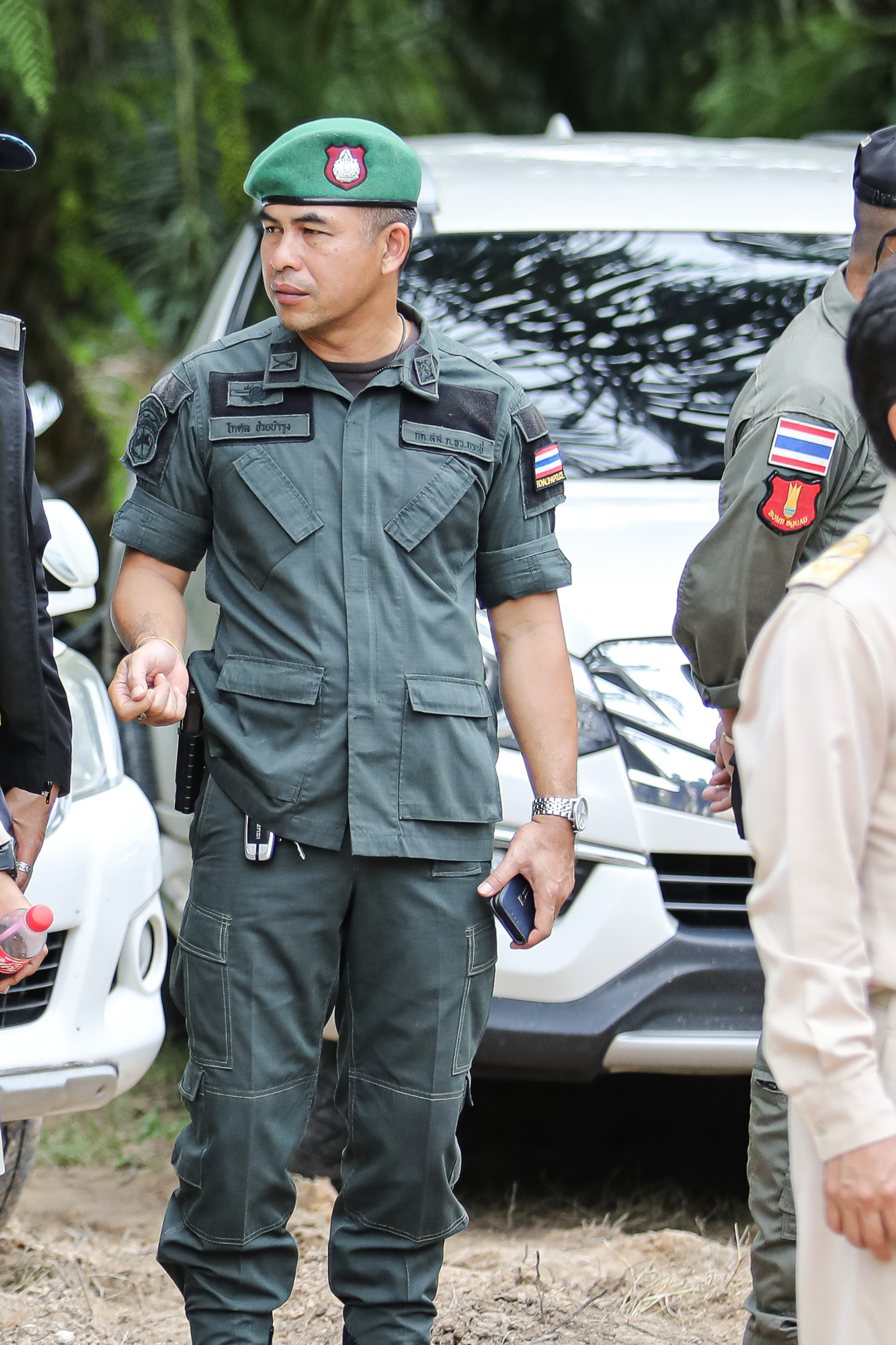
Special Operation Unit of Krabi Province Police

In Thailand, there are two units of green beret users:

- Khaki green – Territorial Defense Student of Royal Thai Army
- Green – Provincial Special Operation Sub-Division of Royal Thai Police. It is a SWAT-level special operations unit, armed with full weapons and more intensive tactical training than local police. It is the first unit to deal with threats in the area at the provincial police and provincial police region. If it exceeds its capabilities, it will request enforcement forces from a higher-level special operations unit, Naresuan 261 from Sub-Division 3, Border Patrol Police Aerial Reinforcement Unit.

== United States Military ==
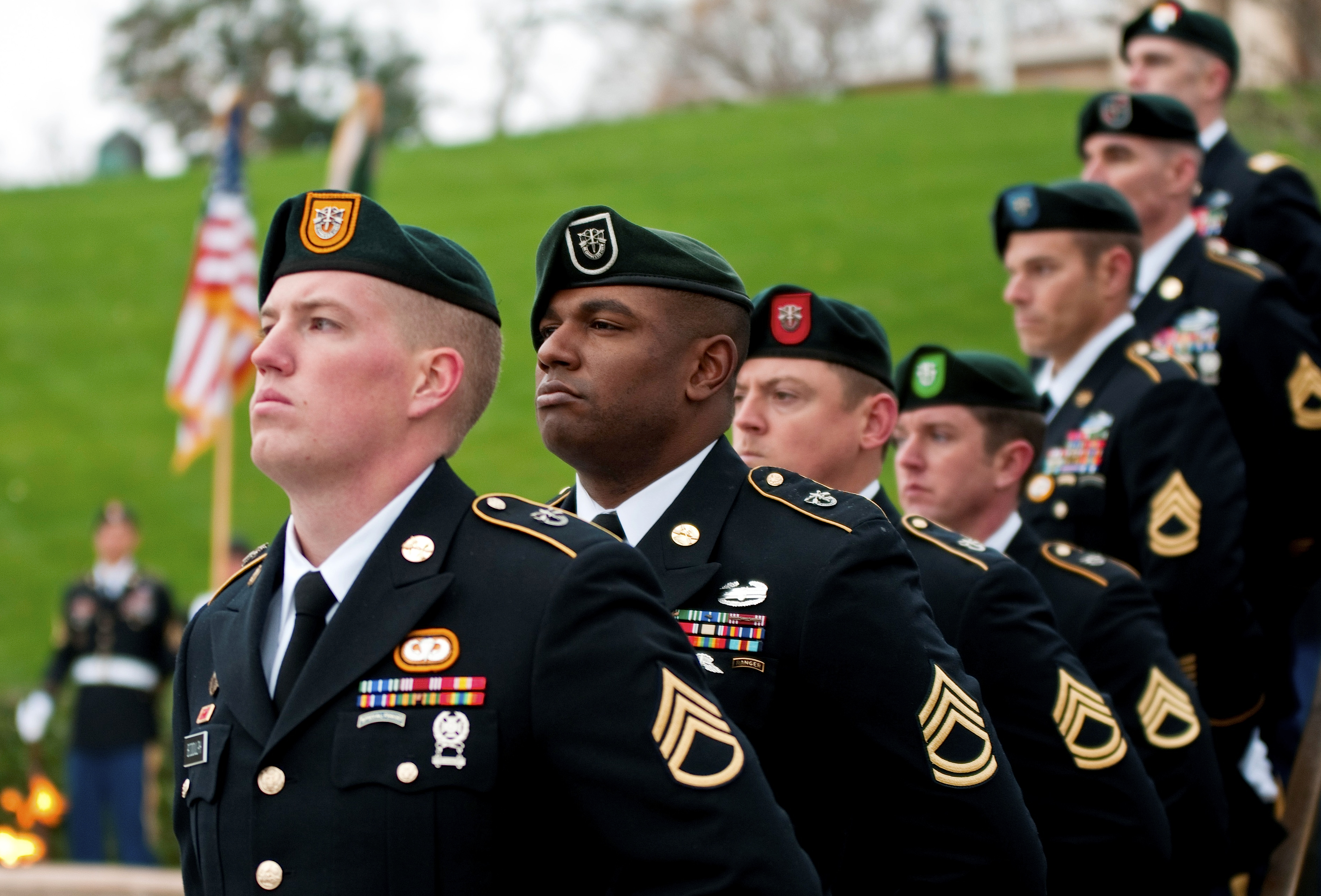
Special Forces soldiers wearing their green berets

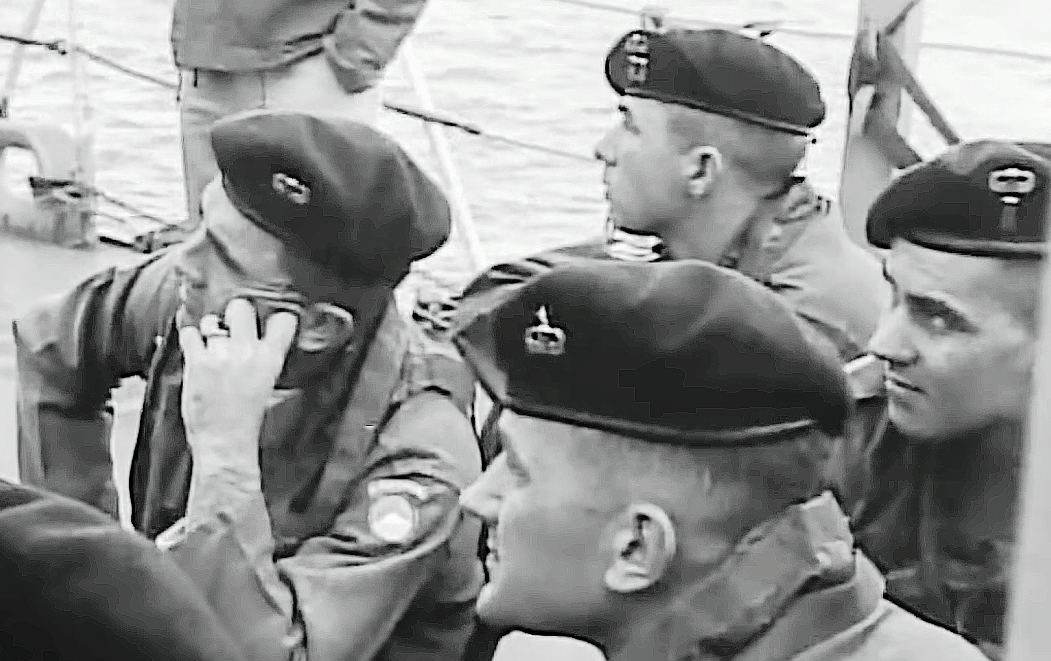
Special Forces soldiers prepare for a combat diving training operation on a US Naval ship near Okinawa, Japan in 1956, wearing green berets prior to their approved wear in 1961.

In the U.S. armed forces today, the green beret may be worn only by soldiers awarded the Special Forces Tab, signifying they have been qualified as Special Forces (SF) soldiers. The Special Forces beret is officially designated "beret, man's, wool, rifle green, army shade 297".

U.S. Special Forces wear the green beret as a distinction of excellence and uniqueness within the Army.

The 10th Special Forces Group (Airborne) had many OSS World War II veterans in their ranks when it was formed in 1952. They began to unofficially wear a berets of varying colour while training. The color green became favored because it was reminiscent of the World War II British Commando-type beret. The 10th Special Forces Group (Airborne) deployed to Bad Tölz, Germany in September 1953. The remaining cadre at Fort Bragg formed the 77th Special Forces Group. Members of the 77th SFG began searching through their collections of berets and settled on the Rifle Green colour of the British Rifle Regiments (as opposed to the Lovat Green of the Commandos) from Captain Mike de la Pena's collection. Captain Frank Dallas had the new beret designed and produced in small numbers for the members of the Special Forces.

Their new headdress was first worn at a retirement parade at Fort Bragg on 12 June 1955 for Major General Joseph P. Cleland, the now-former commander of the XVIII Airborne Corps. Onlookers thought that the commandos were a foreign delegation from NATO.

In 1956 General Paul D. Adams, the post commander at Fort Bragg, banned its wear, even though it was worn surreptitiously when deployed overseas. This was reversed on 25 September 1961 by Department of the Army Message 578636, which designated the green beret as the exclusive headdress of the Army Special Forces.

When visiting the Special Forces at Fort Bragg on 12 October 1961, President John F. Kennedy asked Brigadier General William P. Yarborough to make sure that the men under his command wore green berets for the visit. Later that day, Kennedy sent a memorandum which included the line: "I am sure that the green beret will be a mark of distinction in the trying times ahead". By America's entry into the Vietnam War, the green beret had become a symbol of excellence throughout the US Army. On April 11, 1962, in a White House memorandum to the United States Army, President Kennedy reiterated his view: "The green beret is a symbol of excellence, a badge of courage, a mark of distinction in the fight for freedom". To no avail, both Yarborough and Edson Raff had previously petitioned the Pentagon to allow wearing of the green beret. The President, however, did not fail them.

In addition to being the headdress of the United States Army Special Forces, "Green Berets" is also a well known nickname of the organization.

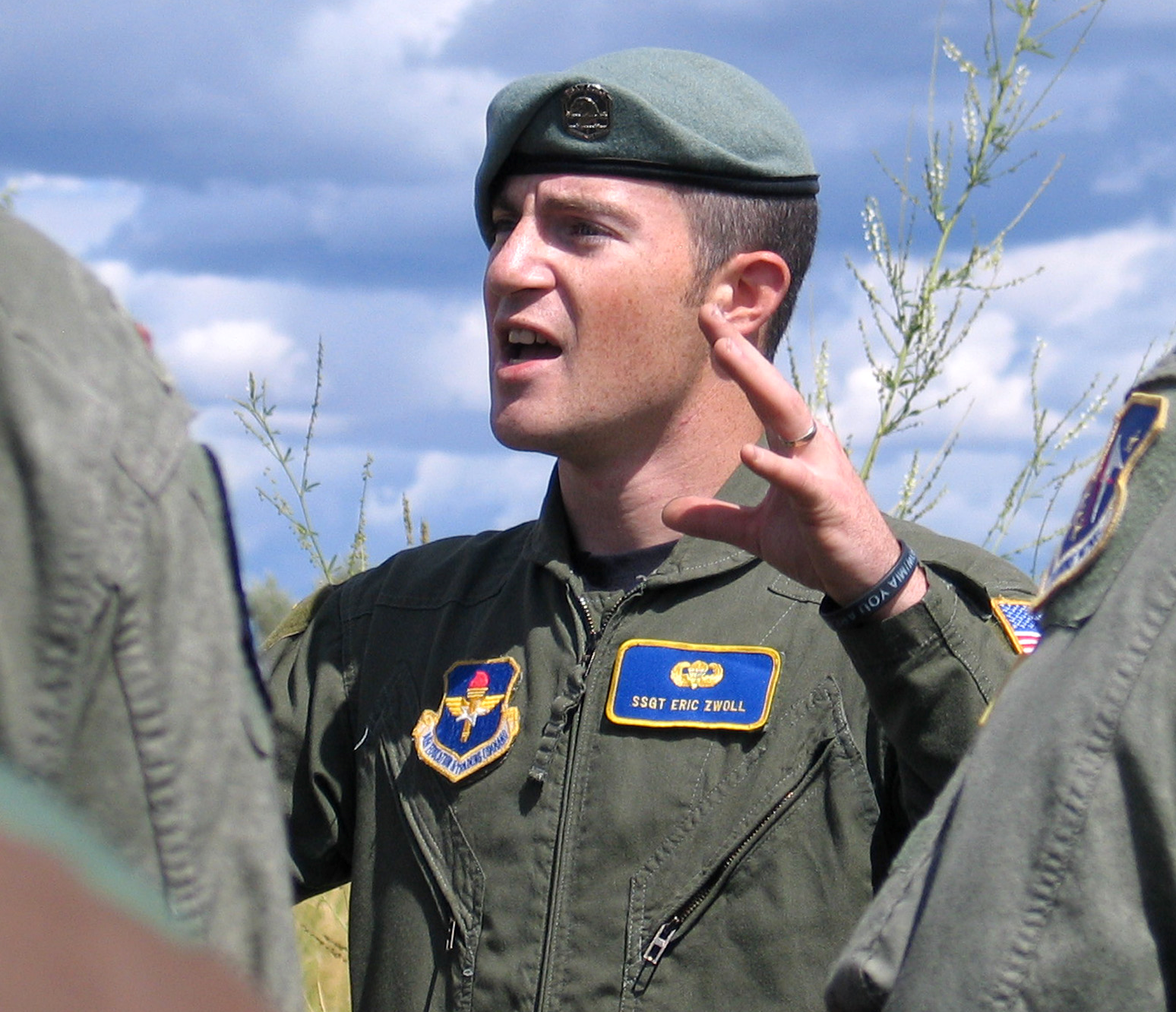
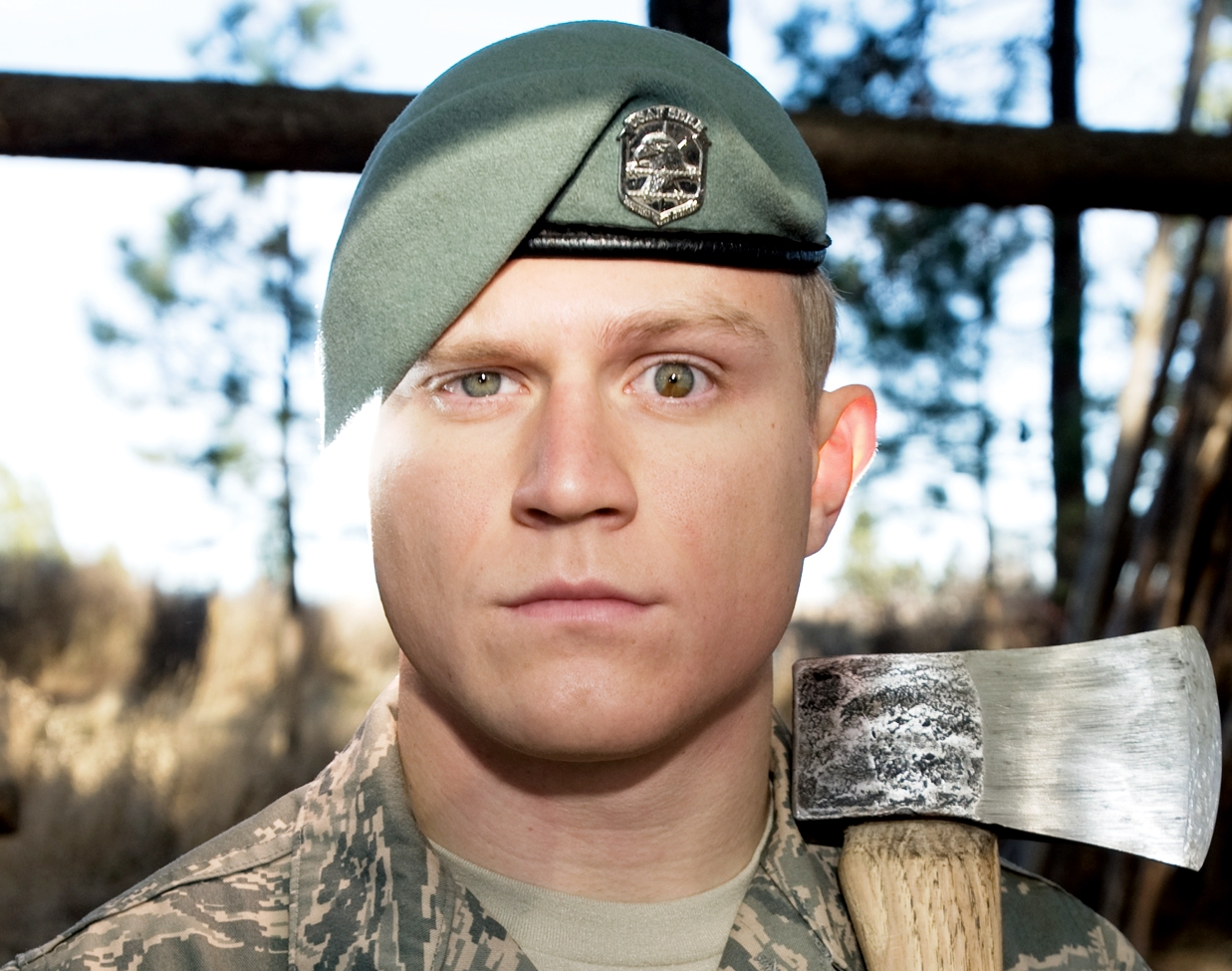
US Air Force SERE Specialists wearing sage-green berets with SERE Crest

The US Air Force has a dedicated cadre of airman trained in Survival, Evasion, Resistance and Escape (SERE) who train other Air Force airman in SERE tactics, help develop escape and evasion plans, and participate in recovery operations. These SERE Specialists are awarded the sage-green beret with SERE crest upon graduation of the SERE training pipeline.

=== Historical US military green berets ===
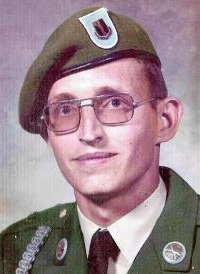
An Infantryman with 1st Bn, 60th Infantry RGT, 172nd Infantry BDE wearing olive-drab beret (c. 1970s)

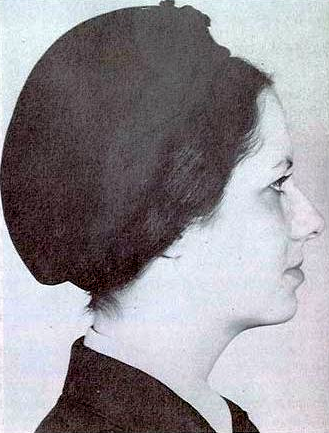
A Marine wearing dark-green female beret (c. 1978)

Of historical note, an olive drab green beret was worn by arctic–qualified soldiers of the 172nd Infantry Brigade stationed in Alaska from 1973 to 1979 when the Department of the Army's morale-enhancing order was in force and various colored berets began to be worn by numerous units and branches of the US Army.

Starting in the 1970s, a special female beret was authorized for wear as alternate headgear for the US Army, US Air Force, US Navy, and US Marine Corps with various service uniforms. These black (Army and Navy), dark-blue (Air Force), and dark-green (Marine Corps) female berets were of similar design and worn on the crown of the head. The Marine Corps dark–green female beret was authorized for wear from 1978 to 1982.
