= ETRACO =

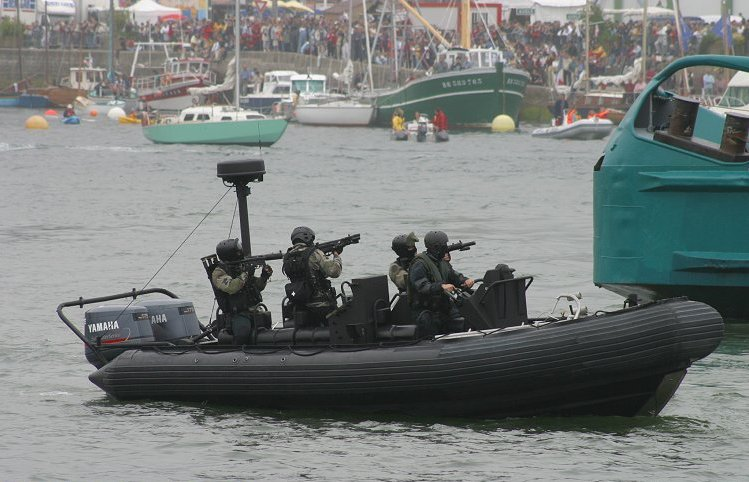
An ETRACO on exercises

The ETRACO (acronym for Embarcation de Transport RApide pour COmmandos, translation in English language "Rapid Transport Boat for Commandos") is the standard light inflatable boat of French special forces naval branch, the Commandos Marine.

In service since 1996, ETRACO was replaced from the summer of 2015 by a new system called ECUME.

== Specifications ==
The ETRACO has these specifications:

- Weight (full): 2,500 kg (2.50 tonnes)
- Length: 7.33 m (24 ft 1 in)
- Speed (full): 45 kn (83 km/h; 52 mph)
- Troops: 12 soldiers (1 driver, 11 fully equipped troops)
