= Philippe Kieffer =

French naval officer (1899–1962)

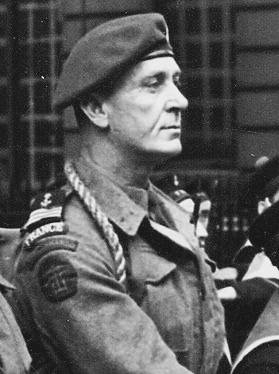
- Born: 24 October 1899; Port-au-Prince, Haiti
- Died: 20 November 1962 (63); Cormeilles-en-Parisis, France
- Military career
- Allegiance: (French Third Republic) France; Free French Forces
- Branch: French Navy; Free French Naval Forces
- Rank: Capitaine de frégate
- Conflicts: World War II
- Awards: Commander of the Légion d'honneur Compagnon de la Libération; Croix de guerre 1939–1945 (4 citations); Military Cross

Philippe Kieffer MBE MC (24 October 1899 – 20 November 1962), capitaine de frégate in the French Navy, was a French officer and political personality, and a hero of the Free French Forces.

== Life and career ==
Born in Port-au-Prince, Haiti, to an Alsatian paternal family and an English mother, Philippe Kieffer obtained a diploma at the La Salle Extension University in Chicago.

== World War II ==
On 2 September 1939, aged 40, he volunteered for military service. He joined the French Navy, in which he was a reserve officer, a week later. He served on the battleship Courbet, and at the headquarters of the Northern Fleet during the Battle of Dunkirk. He left for London on 19 June 1940 and joined the Free French Naval Forces (Forces Navales Françaises Libres) on 1 July 1940, the day they were founded.

Speaking fluent English, he was asked to serve as a translator and cipher officer. Impressed by the techniques of the new British Commandos, formed in 1940, Kieffer requested authorisation to set up an elite French unit on the same model. In May 1941, he obtained authorisation from Admiral Émile Muselier to found the unit of Fusiliers-Marins Commandos ("Marine Riflemen Commandos"). They undertook extremely harsh selection and training in Achnacarry, in Scotland, where a number of candidates died. The Commando was part of No. 10 (Inter-Allied) Commando. Kieffer was promoted to lieutenant de vaisseau (OF-2) on 1 July 1942. On 19 August 1942, men of the 1st Company of the 1er Bataillon de Fusiliers Marins Commandos were engaged during the Dieppe Raid ("Operation Jubilee").

In 1943, the French Commando had grown to two troops, and was regularly used for night raids on the shores of France and the Netherlands during the preparations for the invasion of Normandy. In 1944, the 177 men of the "1er BFM Commando" were integrated into the British No. 4 Commando under Lieutenant-Colonel Dawson, part of the 1st Special Service Brigade under Brigadier Lord Lovat. Since Luxembourg did not have its own units, some Luxembourgish volunteers were incorporated into the "1er BFM Commando" and took part in the landings and battles of Normandy.

=== Liberation of France ===
On 6 June 1944, at 0731, the Bérets verts ("Green berets") landed in Ouistreham, Benouville, Amfreville and Bavent, designated as Sword Beach. Kieffer, recently promoted to capitaine de corvette (OF-3), led his men personally. The unit suffered 21 killed and 93 wounded; Kieffer himself was almost immediately wounded twice, hit by shrapnel in the leg, but refused evacuation for two days. Kieffer rejoined his unit on 14 June, in time to take part in the breakthrough towards the Seine and Honfleur.

Along with two of his men, he was among the first members of the Free French Forces to enter Paris. His 18-year-old son, who had recently joined the Maquis, was killed by German troops near Paris at nearly the same time.

=== End of the War and later life ===
By October 1944, the Commando Battalion had three companies. Kieffer led it during the attacks on Vlissingen and Walcheren to capture the port of Antwerp. He later took part in raids against occupied Dutch islands.

In 1945, he was nominated for the Consultative Assembly, and started working in the Inter-Allied Forces Headquarters. He was promoted to capitaine de frégate (OF-4) in 1954.

Kieffer died in Cormeilles-en-Parisis, France on 20 November 1962 after a long illness, and was buried in Grandcamp, Calvados.

== Awards and honours ==
=== French awards ===
- Commander of the Legion of Honour
- Compagnon of the Order of Liberation (Award #828) by decree of 28 August 1944 *
- War Cross 1939–1945 with 7 citations (6 palms ? 1 bronze star)
- Volunteer combatant's cross
- Commemorative medal for voluntary service in Free France
- 1939–1945 Commemorative war medal with clasps "France", "Grande-Bretagne", "Libération", "Allemagne"
- Medal of a liberated France
- Insignia for the Military Wounded (wounded twice on 6 June 1944, evacuated on 8 June 1944)
- Honour medal for courage and devotion (in bronze)
- Honour medal for youth and sports (in silver)

=== Foreign awards ===
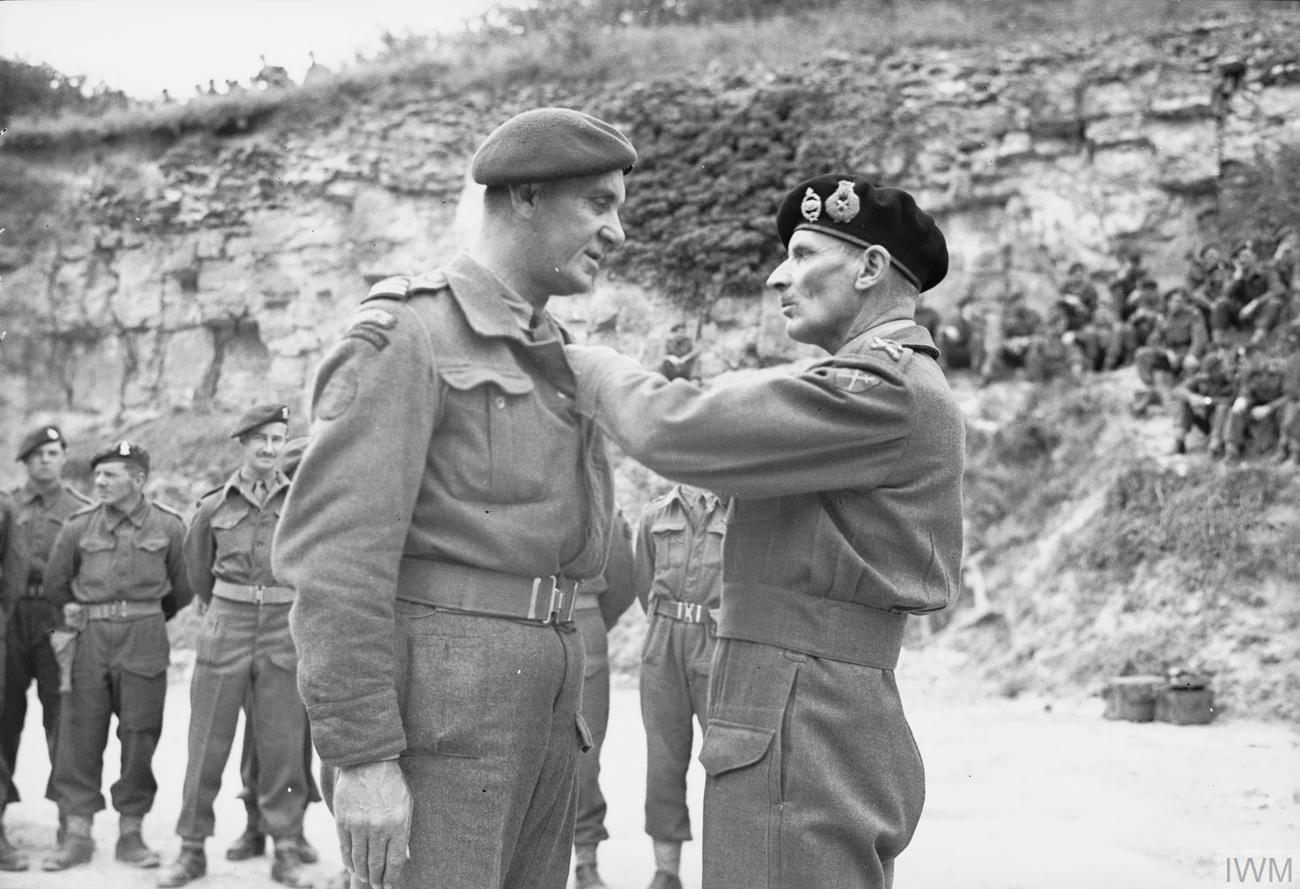
Kieffer being decorated with the Military Cross by Field Marshal Montgomery, 16 July 1944

- Member of the Order of the British Empire (UK)
- Military Cross (UK)
- 1939–45 Star (UK)
- France and Germany Star (UK)
- Defence Medal (UK)

== In popular culture ==
- Kieffer was portrayed by Christian Marquand in the film The Longest Day, in which the action against the fortified casino in Ouistreham is depicted.

== Legacy ==
The stadium of AJS Colleville-Ouistreham based in Ouistreham is named after the officer.

== See also ==
- FORFUSCO : the present commandos
- Naval commandos (France) where one of the 6 Commando units is named after Kieffer.
