= Commandos Marine =

Special operations forces of the French Navy

- Commando beret badge
- Active: 1942 – present
- Country: France
- Branch: French Navy
- Type: Special forces
- Size: 721 authorized personnel (2017)
- Garrison/HQ: Lorient; Saint-Mandrier-sur-Mer
- Nickname: bérets verts (green berets)
- Motto: Unis nous conquérons (United we conquer)

Commanders
- Current commander: Counter admiral Pierre-Marie Josserand de Briançon
- Notable commanders: CDR. Philippe Kieffer; LCDR. Victor Servent

Insignia
- Flag

The Commandos Marine, nicknamed Bérets Verts (Green Berets), are the special operations forces of the French Navy, headquartered in Lorient, Brittany in western France. They operate under the Special Operations Command and FORFUSCO, one of the four main forces of the French Navy. They specialize in offshore operations; operations from sea to land and special operations on land. One of the major characteristics of marine commando units is to be perfectly interoperable with all the resources and units of the navy (vessels, aircraft, submarines).

Comprising seven operational units of around 90 men and around 160 in specialized support, their missions include: hostage rescue, evacuation operations, intelligence within enemy lines, (assault on high-value targets), Navy missions (assault at sea, remote support and destruction, reconnaissance, underwater action) as well as certain missions in support of naval airforce: amphibious operations, guidance and fire support, reinforcement teams, embargo control and State actions at sea against illegal fishing, immigration and trafficking.

== History ==
The Commandos Marine were formed in 1942 during World War II in the United Kingdom and were modelled on the British Commandos (who were founded in 1940). They were formed from Free French volunteers from different services, mainly from Navy Fusiliers Marins (protection forces), other navy specialities and even from the army. They were trained at the Commando Training Centre in Achnacarry, Scotland and joined No. 10 (Inter-Allied) Commando as the 1st and the 8th Troops. To commemorate this, the beret of the French naval commandos is worn pulled to the right with the badge worn over the left eye or temple, the opposite of all other French military units.

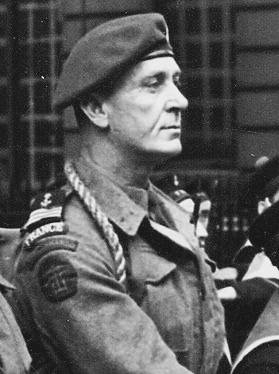
Lieutenant Commander Philippe Kieffer.

The 1st BFMC (Bataillon de Fusiliers Marins Commandos, Commando Sailor Riflemen Battalion) took part in the Normandy Landing on D-Day under the command of Lieutenant Commander Philippe Kieffer, on Sword, and were for the occasion integrated in No. 4 Commando. They further participated in the Netherlands campaign, still associated with No. 4 Commando. When the British Commando Units were disbanded at the conclusion of World War II, the two French Troops (forming the 1st BFMC) were repatriated to France to relieve in position the 1st RFM (1st Sailor Riflemen Regiment) departing for Indochina. Most of them demobilised or returned to their services (army or other navy specialities) but Commander Philippe Kieffer made the case to the French Ministry of the Navy that a Commando Corps was a capacity required to counter the guerrilla warfare in Indochina. The surviving members of the 1st BFMC formed the core leadership and the cadres for the Commando Training School to be created in Algeria in 1946 (Siroco Center, Matifou Cape).

Another branch comes from a Naval Reconnaissance Unit created in December 1944, Company NYO, formed from volunteers from different parts of the Navy, mainly Sailor Riflemen (Fusiliers Marins) and Naval Artillery. This unit later renamed as Company Merlet (the name of its founder and commanding officer, Lieutenant (Navy) Jean Merlet), fought in Italy before embarking for Indochina in September 1945. It was renamed Company Jaubert, then naturally became Commando Jaubert, the first unit to be constituted as Commando when the French Navy decided to create a Commando Corps in 1946.

Commander Pierre Ponchardier and his Special Air Service Battalion a.k.a. SAS-B (also nicknamed Tigers Commandos), created in early 1945, fought in Indochina until 1946 before the battalion was disbanded. Ponchardier was a visionary of modern SOF. Although he was not subordinated to a Sailor Rifleman chain of command, he ran large-scale operations in conjunction and with the support of Compagnie Merlet/Jaubert and the 1st RFM. His audacity, the innovation of the TTPs and the course of actions he applied in guerrilla warfare and COIN set the spirit and were disseminated to the overall Commandos Marine organisation.

By a 19 May 1947 decision, the Ministry of the Navy decision created five "Commando Marine" units, organised and designed as the former British Commandos. The French Navy transformed several Fusiliers Marins companies (Sailor Riflemen) already combatting in Indochina (including Company Jaubert) or based aboard French Navy destroyers (to become Commando Trepel and Commando de Penfentenyo) and gradually renewed their personnel with commando-qualified recruits after the Siroco Center (commando course) was commissioned. Commando François and Commando Hubert were formed from scratch. Although Commando Jaubert was already trained for parachute and airborne operations, Commando Hubert became the official paratrooper commando unit for the French Navy. For this reason, they integrated by preference and priority former Ponchardier SAS-B members, who were already jump qualified.

Each Commando Marine bears the name of an officer killed in action during World War II or during the Indochina campaign:

Captain Charles Trepel was an Army officer (artillery), Free French Forces; commanding officer of the 8th Troop (French), No. 10 Commando (Inter-allied). MIA/KIA 28 February 1944 during a night reconnaissance raid in Wassenaar, the Netherlands.

Lieutenant Augustin Hubert was an Army officer (infantry), Free French Forces; platoon leader in the K-Gun Troop (French) operating in support of Troop 1 and 8 (French) integrated for D-Day to the No. 4 Commando. He was killed 6 June 1944, in the first hour of combat, when the French Troops were maneuvering to seize the Casino of Ouistreham near Sword.

Commander François Jaubert was a Navy officer, commanding the Riverine Flotilla in Indochina, severely wounded during a joint operation with Compagnie Merlet, Ponchardier SAS-B and the 1st RFM and his Flotilla. He died of his wounds 25 January 1946.

Lieutenant (junior grade) Alain de Penfentenyo was a Navy officer, commanding officer of an LCVP platoon, killed in action during a riverine raid on the Donai river, 14 February 1946 (Indochina).

Lieutenant (junior grade) Louis de Montfort was a Company Merlet platoon commander. After his commander was wounded and evacuated de Montfort took command and was killed leading the company in Haiphong, 26 November 1946 (Indochina).

Lieutenant Jacques François was a Navy officer, commanding the 1st Amphibious Flotilla North. He was killed leading his unit, 6 January 1947 on the Nam-Dinh-Giang river (Indochina).

Commando François suffered dramatic losses on 29 May 1951 when it faced the attack of the 308th Vietminh division in Ninh Bình (Indochina). Only 29 survived, five were taken prisoner for months, 40 were killed and nine were declared missing in action. Their sacrifice disrupted the surprise effect and unveiled General Giap's plans for the battle of Day. It gave French General de Lattre time to organise his counterattack. This commando unit was disbanded in May 1953.

Commando Hubert officially became a combat swimmer unit on 30 March 1953. It was a joint unit composed of Navy and Army (SDEC, secret service) combat swimmers. The army branch later separated to establish their base in Aspretto, Corsica (France) and today in Quélern, Brittany (France).

Commando Kieffer was created 6 June 2008 in Ouistreham during the D-Day commemoration ceremony.

In May 2019, four hostages were freed from terrorists during an operation in Burkina Faso. French commandos took down the location in Burkina Faso which was considered a terrorist camp. Two operatives from "Hubert" Underwater Operations Commando were killed in the operation which took place in the early morning hours of Friday morning.

== Recruitment and training ==
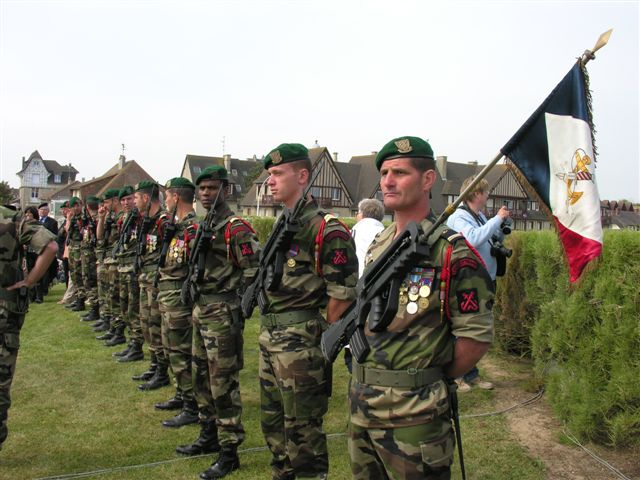
Tribute to Commando Kieffer, 6 June 2009

Most of the recruits must have completed the Fusiliers-Marins Basic Training and served at least nine months of service. They have to enter a special forces basic training course, called Stage Commando (commando training) and reputed to be one of the toughest among the NATO Special Operation Forces. In 2016, the Stage Commando had an attrition rate of 82%. The SOF Basic Training is open to sailors or enlisted from other Navy specialties. Commando Kieffer recruits specialists and experts from other specialties in the Navy or other services. They must go through the same training pipeline to earn the green beret and be deployed overseas.

Commando training is the gateway to the Special Operations Forces for the Sailor Riflemen. Conducted at the Fusilier Marins school at Lorient on the Atlantic coast, it provides upon successful completion entry to the commandos and the right to wear the green beret. Lasting 20 weeks, it includes one week of commando testing, six weeks of screening and preparatory training, four weeks of evaluation, the actual SOF course for seven weeks, and two weeks of parachute training. During this period, any mistake can instantly disqualify the candidate. The ultimate goal of this training is to detect individuals with the physical, intellectual and psychological potential needed to serve in the Commandos Marine. The historical roots of commando training date back to the Second World War, when Fusilier-Marins volunteers from the Free French Navy went to the Commando training center in Achnacarry, Scotland. Since then, the Commandos Marine have kept by tradition the green beret pulled right with the bronze shield badge on the left, the only such exception in the French armed forces. They have retained the principle of exceptional training without compromise, based on immersion in a highly stressful environment, close to the conditions of combat operations.

The prospective Commandos in training are constantly under stress and pressure from instructors leaving them no respite. All activities are timed and scored: marching tens of kilometers with equipment and weapon in all weathers, obstacle courses and night navigation exercises. The training is punctuated by firearms training and assault tactics, climbing and rappelling, boat handling, explosives instruction and hand-to-hand combat. The instructors are experienced operatives assigned to the Commando School who monitor and punish failure with extra-hard physical activity.

Some of the firearms utilized are: Heckler & Koch USP, Glock 17, PAMAS G1 (French licensed copy of the Beretta 92), Heckler & Koch MP5, HK416 and the FAMAS rifle (but only for training). From 1996 to 2015 they used ETRACO inflatable boats, which were then replaced by a new system called ECUME.

== Composition ==
Their personnel are distributed between seven commandos of around 90 men, with the exception of commando Ponchardier which comprises around 160 personnel, named after former commando officers killed in action, and are dedicated maritime counter-terrorist units:

Insignia	Team	Deployment	Number of Platoons	HQ	Notes
	Commando Jaubert	Worldwide	5	Lorient, France	Direct action, assault at sea and on land, hot extraction, close quarters battle at sea and on land. Equal capabilities in the land and maritime Counter Terrorism (CT) roles.
	Commando de Montfort	Worldwide	5	Lorient, France	Reconnaissance, Intelligence Operations, Long Range Neutralisation (SKIT), JTACs. Comprises a platoon named ESNO.
	Commando de Penfentenyo	Worldwide	5	Lorient, France	Reconnaissance, Intelligence Operations, Long Range Neutralisation (SKIT), JTACs. Comprises a platoon named ESNO.
	Commando Trépel	Worldwide	5	Lorient, France	Direct Action, assault at sea and land, hot extraction, close quarters battle at sea and on land. Equal capabilities in the land and maritime CT roles.
	Commando Hubert	Worldwide	Classified	Toulon, France	(also named Commando d'Action Sous-Marine Hubert, CASM, "Underwater Operations Commando"): Underwater action (combat divers) and Counter Terrorism
	Commando Kieffer	Worldwide	Classified	Lorient, France	C3I, Combat dogs K9, CP CBRN, UAVs, Intel, TTPs and Procedures Development.
	Commando Ponchardier	Worldwide	Classified	Lorient, France	Support and supply for all Commandos Marine.

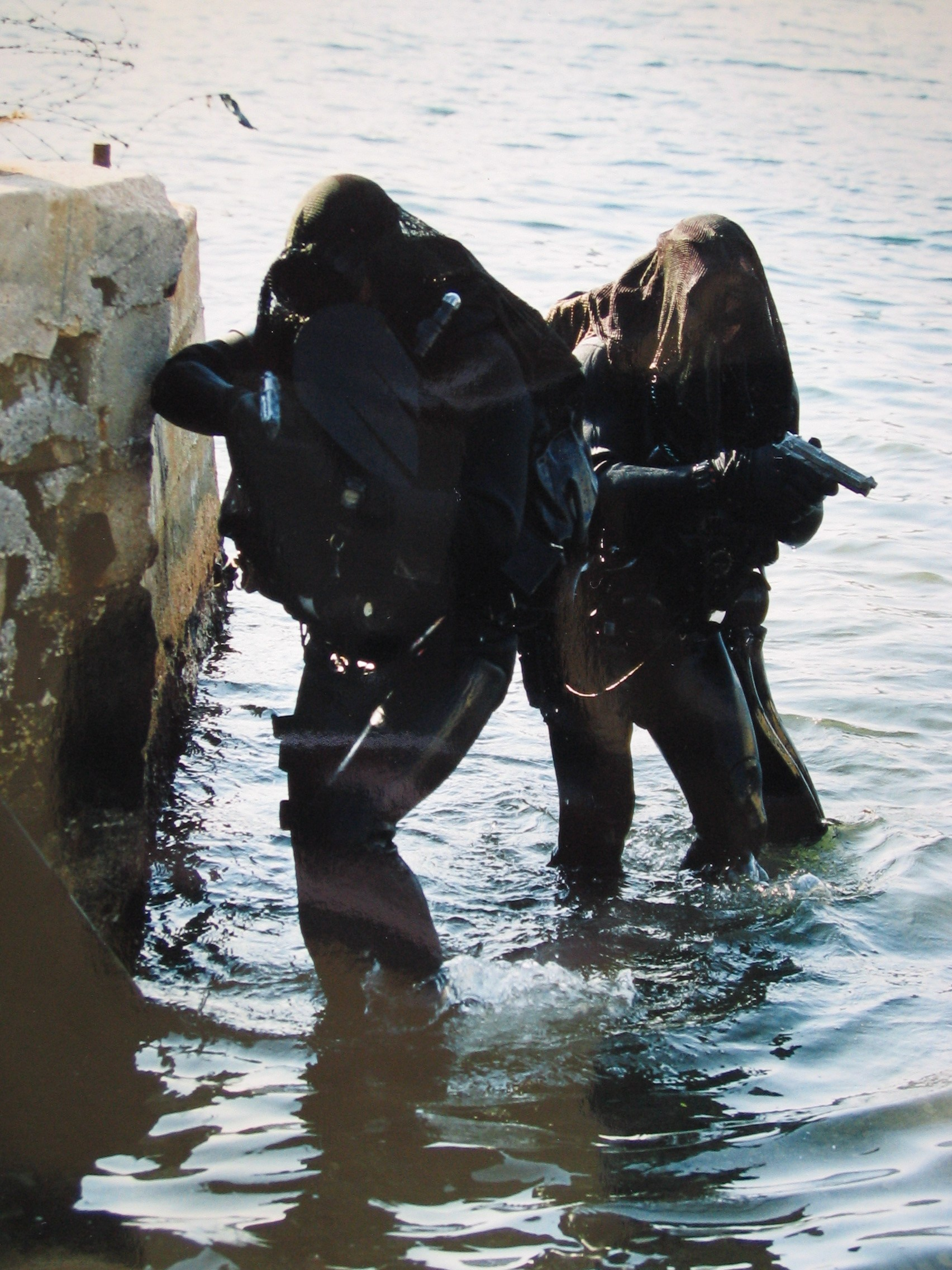
Commando Hubert personnel transition over a beach.

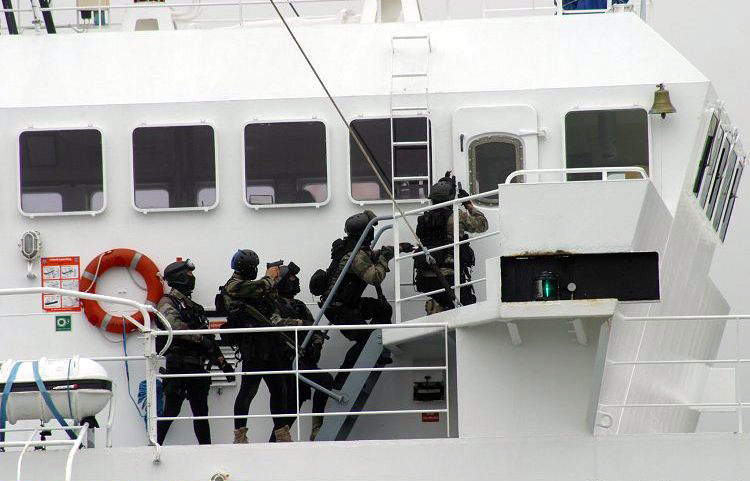
Commando Jaubert personnel storm the Alcyon in a mock assault.

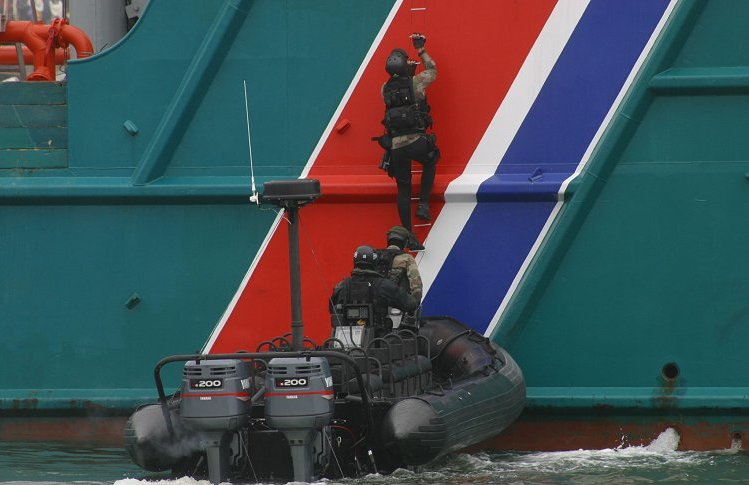
Members of the Commando Jaubert covering each other.

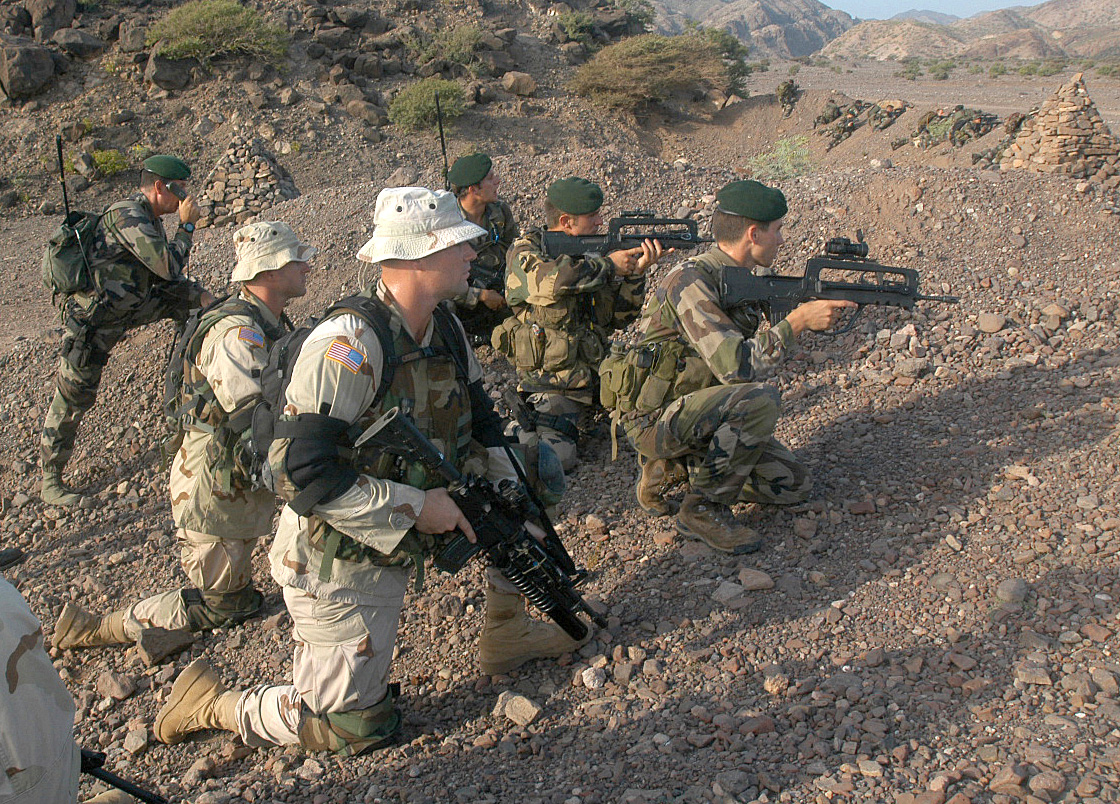
U.S. Army Soldiers from the 3rd Infantry Division and French Commandos Marine conduct a reconnaissance patrol during a joint-combined exercise in Djibouti.

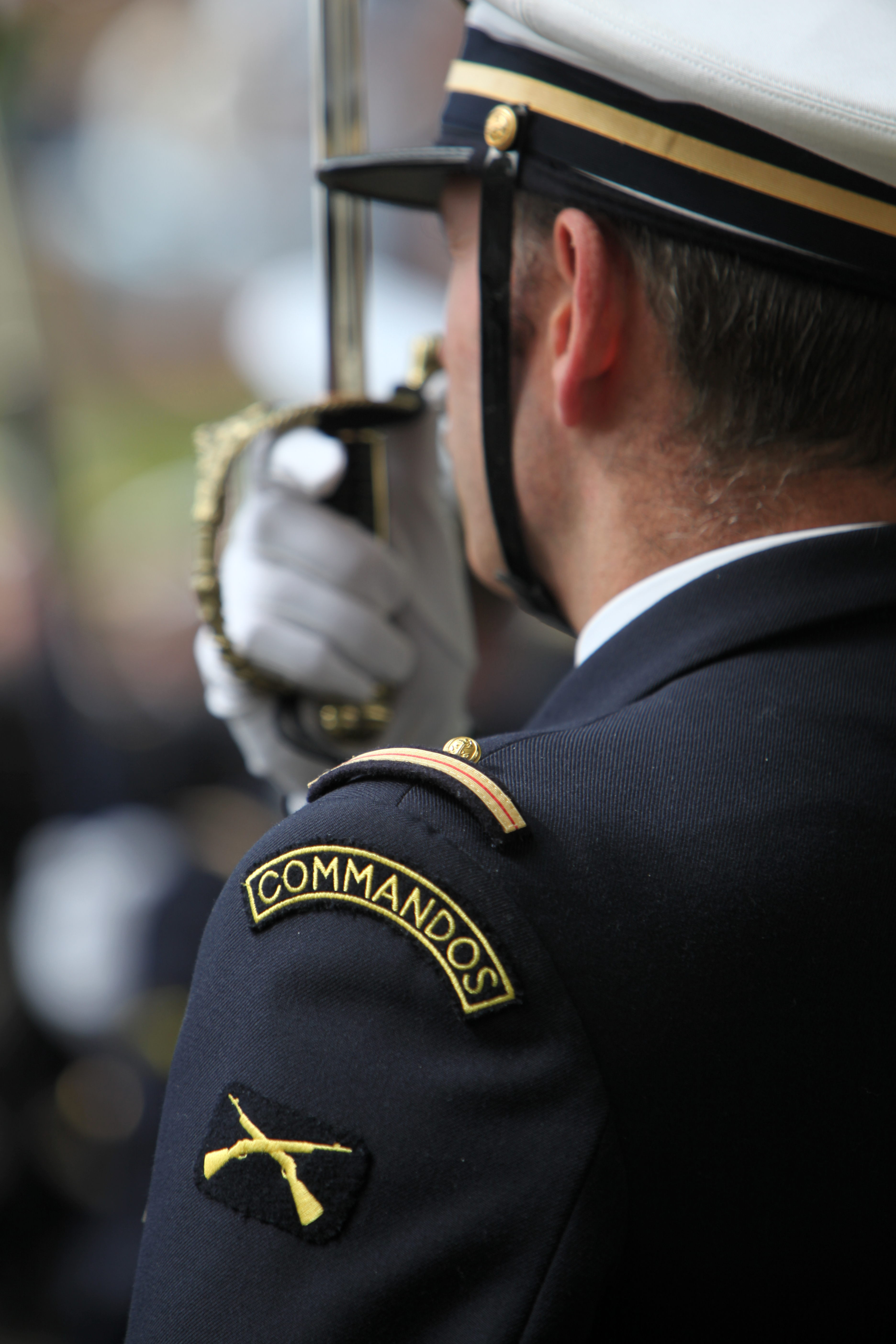
A member of the Commandos Marine during a ceremony.

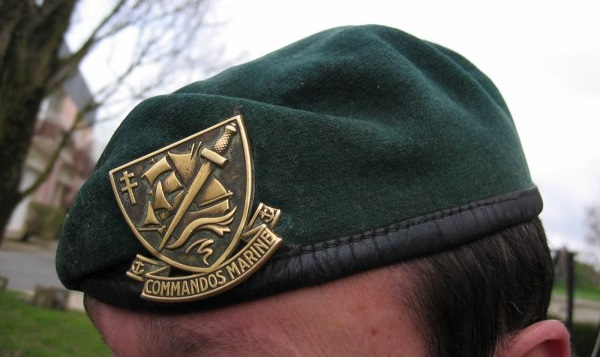
Beret and badge of the Commandos Marine.

=== Commando Hubert ===
Since the 1950s, the combat swimmer unit of the French Navy have been formed as Commando Hubert, also known as French commando frogmen, the only Commandos Marine unit having combat swimmers. The tip of the spear of the overall Commandos Marine organization, their military capacities are broader than combat swimming operations. They are publicly known to be a Special Mission Unit supporting counter terrorism along with GIGN (see Ouvea cave, MS Pascal Paoli). Jacques-Yves Cousteau was a naval officer in World War II and helped to set up France's commando frogmen. France further developed the role of commando frogmen in the First Indochina War.

The French intelligence service DGSE also has combat-swimmers brought together in the Centre Parachutiste d'Entraînement aux Opérations Maritimes (CPEOM, "maritime operations training parachutist center") at Roscanvel.

While these are the only French combat-diver units, other French units have divers, including:

- the military engineer units of the French Army have two types of divers:
  - the spécialistes d'aide au franchissement (SAF, "specialists for help in clearing"): swimmers trained to recon and clear banks and bridges to permit their use by military vehicles.
  - the nageurs d'intervention offensive (NIO, swimmers "for offensive actions"): they accomplish missions similar to combat swimmers but in rivers and estuaries, to destroy bridges inside enemy territory for example and belong to an engineer-regiment.
- some commando units like the commando group of the 2nd foreign parachutist regiment and the special unit forces of the Army and the Air Force have offensive divers.
- the GIGN and RAID counter-terrorist groups have divers trained to assault a hijacked ship in support of Commando Hubert.

==== List of operations ====
- 1982-1984: Lebanon
- 1987: Actions in the Persian Gulf.
- 1988 May 5: a hostage rescue in New Caledonia: see Ouvéa cave hostage taking.
- 1991: Embargo in the Persian Gulf.
- 1992 December - 1993: Somalia: Operation Restore Hope.
- 1994: Rwanda: evacuating foreign nationals caught up in a civil war.
- 1997 March - 2000: Mission Alba in Albania.
- 1999: Operation Allied Force in FR Yugoslavia.
- 2001 July: Security at the G8 meeting in Genoa in Italy.
- 2001 October: Afghanistan and/or Philippines: Operation Enduring Freedom.
- 2008 September: French naval commandos freed two hostages (Jean-Yves and Bernadette Delanne) held by Somali pirates aboard their yacht off the coast of Somalia, killing one gunman and capturing six.
- Since January 2013 : Multiple counter-terrorist operations during the Mali war, part of Operation Serval and Operation Barkhane
- May 2019: Burkina Faso hostage rescue by Commando Hubert

== In popular culture ==
The Commandos Marine are featured in the movie Forces spéciales.

== See also ==
- Fusiliers Marins
- FORFUSCO
- List of French paratrooper units – List of French airborne units from the Interwar period to the present
- Special Boat Service – Special forces unit of the Royal Navy. Formed originally from the RMBPD
