= Gorom-Gorom rescue operation =

French rescue operation in West Africa

- Part of the Islamist insurgency in Burkina Faso, Operation Barkhane, and the War against the Islamic State
Date	9 – 10 May 2019
Location	Near Gorom-Gorom, Sahel Region, Burkina Faso 14°27′N 0°14′W
Result	French victory: 4 hostages rescued; 2 French soldiers killed

Belligerents
France; Supported by: United States (intelligence support); Burkina Faso (logistical support)	Islamic State in the Greater Sahara

Units involved
Special Operations Command: Commandos Marine; Commando Hubert; 1st Marine Infantry Parachute Regiment (1^{er} R.P.I.Ma); Air Parachute Commando No. 10	Unknown

Strength
(France) 24 commandos ~ 10 helicopters 2 MQ-9 Reaper drones 1 CASA medical plane (United States) 1 MQ-9 Reaper drone	6 gunmen

Casualties and losses
2 killed	4 killed
- 4 hostages freed
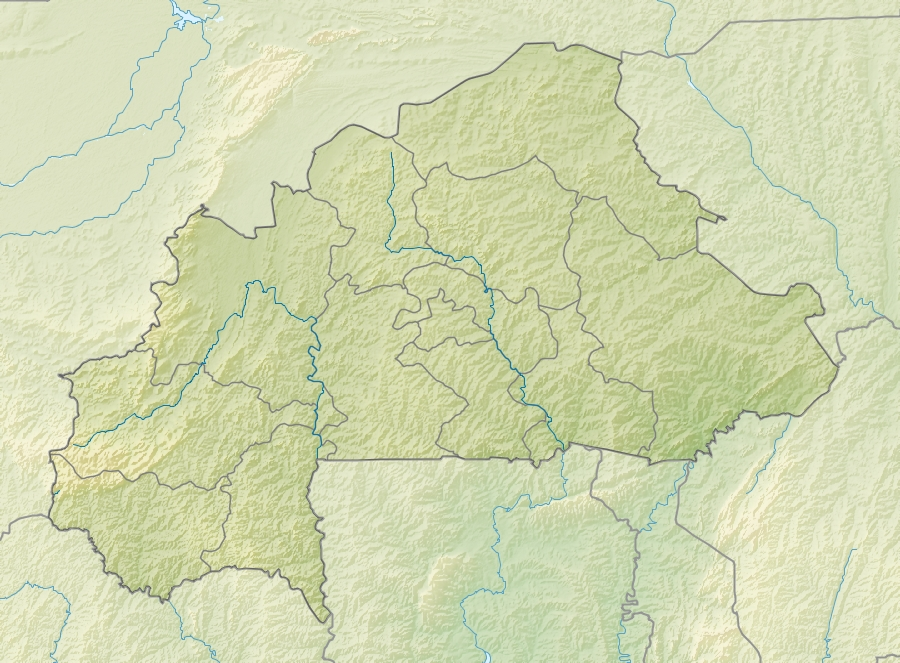
- Location of Gorom-Gorom, close to where the operation took place.

On May 9, 2019, French special operations forces conducted an operation in Gorom-Gorom, northern Burkina Faso to rescue two hostages kidnapped by the Islamic State in the Greater Sahara in Pendjari National Park, Benin. The operation successfully freed four hostages, including two French nationals, a South Korean, and an American. Two French soldiers were killed in the raid, and four jihadists were killed.

== Background ==
On May 1, 2019, French tourists Laurent Lassimouillas and Patrick Picque were kidnapped in Pendjari National Park in Benin. The body of their Beninese tour guide Flacre Gbedji was found disfigured and shot near Gbedji's burnt-out car. The killing and kidnapping was the first attack by jihadists in Benin. A South Korean hostage and an American hostage were kidnapped a month prior in Burkina Faso.

The kidnappers then retreated to Burkina Faso with the hostages. According to the French General Staff, the jihadists stayed in Burkina Faso for several days with the intention of handing the hostages to the Katiba Macina in Mali. While the Katiba Macina organized the kidnapping, it was militants from the Islamic State in the Greater Sahara based in eastern Burkina Faso that carried out the kidnapping.

Immediately after the kidnapping, the Direction du renseignement militaire (DRM) began intelligence missions aided by the United States and Burkina Faso. The kidnappers traveled 350 kilometers within a few days towards the Malian border, mostly at night through the bush. American intelligence intercepted the jihadists from their cell phones conversations.

== Rescue ==
The rescue operation began across a wide swath of northern Burkina Faso on May 7. France mobilized forces from Task Force Sabre, from Operation Barkhane, and drones and helicopters to intercept the jihadists. Burkinabe troops provided logistical support on key routes, and American forces provided a MQ-9 drone.

The kidnappers stopped on May 9, allowing French forces to conduct a raid. The Special Operations Command led by Laurent Isnard received the first information about the camp in the early afternoon, and Isnard recommended launching the raid within the next few hours. Isnard and the SOC's plan of action was approved by Emmanuel Macron and François Lecointre that evening.

Fighting began near Gorom-Gorom, Sahel Region when 24 soldiers from Commando Hubert, the 1st Marine Infantry Parachute Regiment, and Air Parachute Commando No. 10 raided the camp. The soldiers were first dropped off about ten kilometers from the camp by ten helicopters, and French forces also mobilized a medical evacuation plane. Two French and an American drone provided surveillance. A little before midnight, the commandos began their trek toward the camp. As they approached, they heard the jihadists loading their guns. The French soldiers killed the sentry after he had spotted them, and mounted the assault intending not to hit the hostages. The soldiers entered each encampment simultaneously, and two soldiers were killed in two encampments.

Both French hostages, the South Korean, and the American hostage were recovered. The latter two had been held for 28 days, and French officials stated that the South Korean and American's discovery was a surprise.

== Aftermath ==
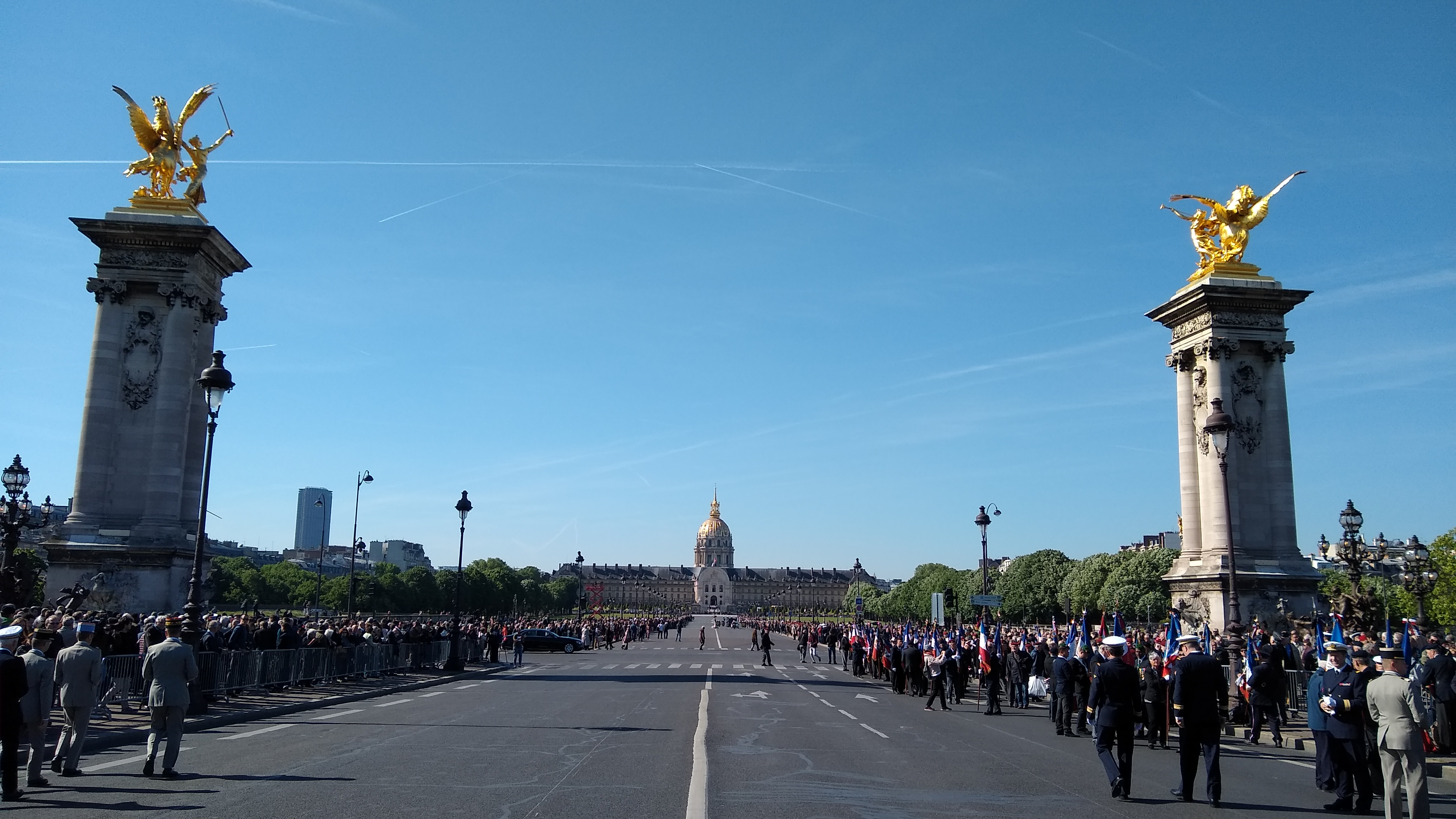
Funeral procession for the fallen French operators in Paris on May 14.

Four jihadists were killed in the raid and two others escaped. Two French petty officers, Cedric de Pierrepont and Alain Bertoncello were killed during the operation, and were given a national tribute on May 14 in Les Invalides. During the ceremony they were both posthumously promoted to chief petty officer and honored with the Legion of Honour. No other French soldiers were injured.

The Beninese, Burkinabe, American, and French governments all congratulated the operation and expressed condolences to the two soldiers. Following the rescue, the two Frenchmen and the South Korean were received by President Emmanuel Macron at Villacoublay airport. The former captives expressed their thanks to the soldiers that died and to the French and Burkinabe authorities for their roles in the rescue. The American hostage's identity was never revealed.

On May 14, 2019, a national tribute was held in Paris in honour of the two soldiers that died during the rescue mission.
