= Air Parachute Commando No. 10 =

- Commando parachutiste de l'air no 10
- Active: June 1, 1956
- Country: France
- Branch: French Air and Space Force
- Type: Special Forces
- Role: Special Reconnaissance; Unorthodox warfare Counterterrorism
- Part of: Special Operations Command
- Garrison/HQ: Orléans – Bricy Air Base
- Patron: Saint Michael
- Mottos: Sicut aquila Like an eagle
- Engagements: Algerian War War in Afghanistan (2001–2021): Operation Blacksmith Hammer; War on terror: War against the Islamic State; Opération Chammal; Gorom-Gorom rescue operation; Operation Serval: Battle of Timetrine; Operation Barkhane
- Decorations: Cross for Military Valour

The Air Parachute Commando No. 10 (CPA 10), is a French special forces unit of the French Air and Space Force and is attached to the Special Operations Command. It is currently headquartered in Air Base 123. The unit specialises in Counterterrorism, Unorthodox warfare, Special Reconnaissance, Combat Search and Rescue and Aerial guidance (JTACs).

== History ==
In 1935, the Soviets carried out the first parachute drops with their equipment and support materials and France, interested by this mode of deployment, sent three officers for training in the Soviet Union in order to familiarize themselves with the parachuting techniques and equipment used by the USSR.

The CPA 10 was officially established on June 1, 1956, and upon its formation, took part in the Algerian War.

On January 1, 1994, the CPA 10 was integrated into France's Special Operations Command.

CPA took part in the War in Afghanistan with one of its most notable operations being "Operation Blacksmith Hammer".

Since early 2013 (January), the French Armed Forces including CPA 10 have been active in the Mali War with operations "Serval" and "Barkhane". A notable battle in this conflict was the battle of Timetrine, where CPA 10 commandos alongside other units engaged and took out an Al-Qaeda in the Islamic Maghreb commander "Mohamed Lemine Ould El-Hassen".

During the 2018 Ouagadougou attacks the CPA 10 ensured the protection of both the French embassy in Burkina Faso and the Burkinabe Armed Forces General Staff.

== Gallery ==
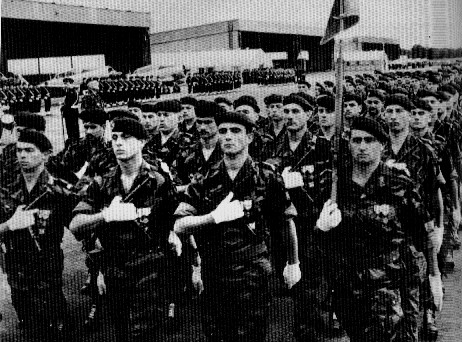
CPA10 on parade at REGHAIA

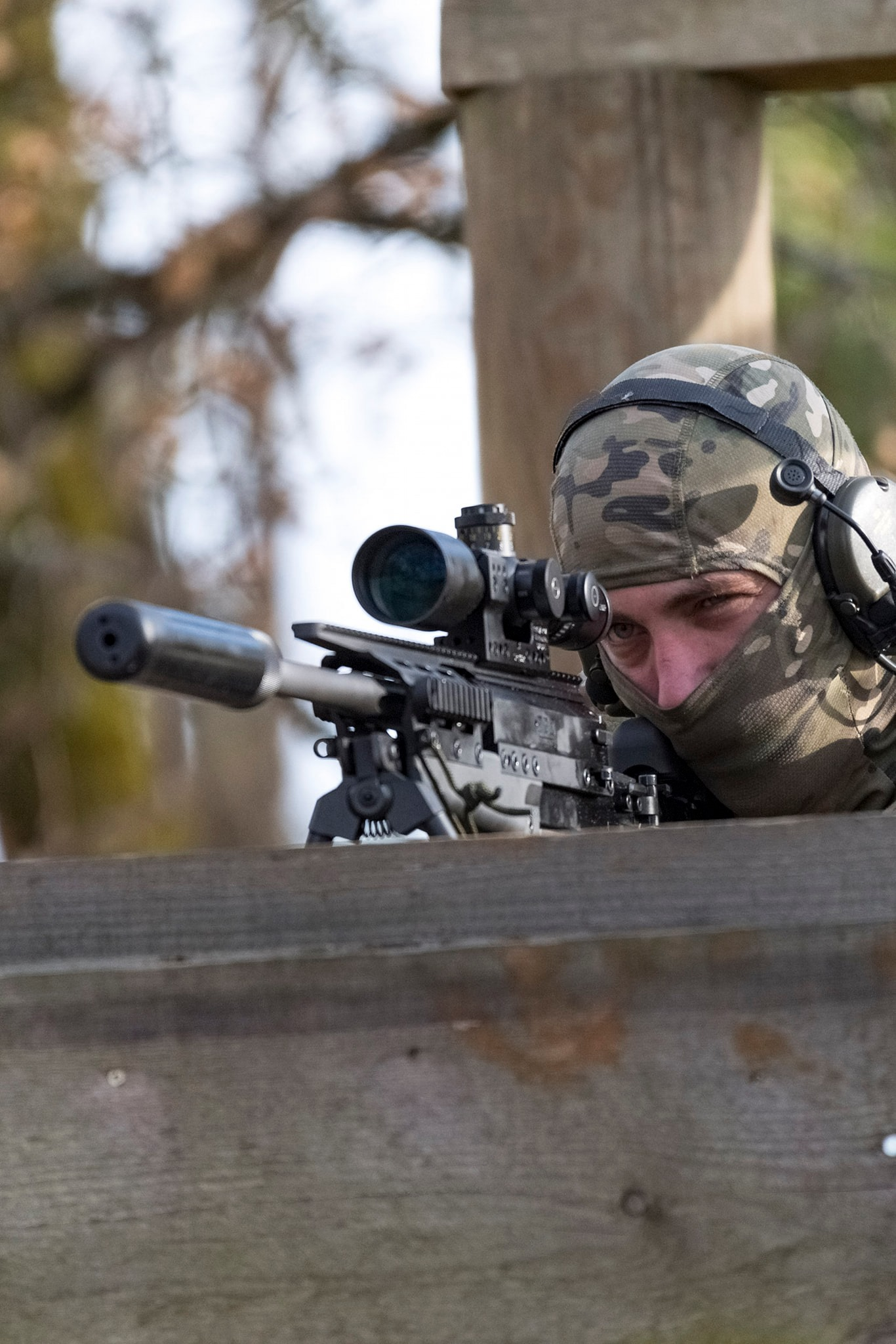
CPA10 Sniper

== See also ==
- 75th Ranger Regiment
