= FORFUSCO =

French Navy organisation

The Force maritime des fusiliers marins et commandos (FORFUSCO) is a French Navy organisation responsible for the command of Fusiliers Marins and Commandos Marine. It is headquartered in Lorient. FORCUSCO is headed by a general officer with the title of Admiral commandant les fusiliers marins et commandos (ALFUSCO). A 2,700-man strong force, the FORFUSCO is the fourth organic force of the French Navy.

== Function ==
This force carries out:

- Advanced force and reconnaissance operations from the sea
- Special operations
- Protection of key sites and vessels of the French Navy
- Provision of security for elements of the naval forces.

== Sailor Riflemen ==
Battalions and companies of sailors are dedicated to the protection of sensitive naval sites (eg military ports, naval aviation bases, communications transmission stations, ammunition depots). The sailors are also an integral part of buildings as domestic service - called "bidellerie" in navy slang.

There are seven companies of sailors (CIFUSIL), which provide protection for the following sites:

- Military port of Cherbourg
- Submarine base in Île Longue and pyrotechnics in Guenvénez
- Naval aviation base in Lann Bihoué
- Communications center in Rosnay, Indre
- Communications center in Sainte-Assise, Seine-et-Marne
- Communications center in Villepinte France and South Saissac, Aude
- Naval aviation base in Lanvéoc-Poulmic (unit created on 1 September 2011 after the closure of the naval aviation base in Nimes-Garons)
- Sailor riflemen and Commando training center Lorient

These seven companies send detachments who take turns every four to six months to ensure the protection of the communications centers of Fort-de-France, Mahina Mahina Super and around Papeete, of Ouen Toro in Noumea, and Rufisque near Dakar. They also support operations of the Navy Commandos (Commandos Marine), augment boarding parties and provide military training to the French navy.

== Navy Commandos ==
The Commandos Marine are trained to targeted actions in places where it is not feasible or appropriate to deploy a larger force. They are primarily used by the French Special Operations Command (COS) since 1992. They are seven in number: Commando Jaubert, Commando Ponchardier, Commando Trepel, Commando de Montfort, Commando de Penfentenyo, Commando Kieffer, and Commando Hubert, each with their own mission specialism. They have evolved to be broadly comparable to the British SBS.

== See also ==
- Fusiliers Marins
- Commandos Marine
- List of French paratrooper units
- Fleet Protection Group, Royal Marines
- Special Boat Service
