= 1er Bataillon de Fusiliers Marins Commandos =

French commando unit

- Active: 1942–1946
- Countries: Free France (1942–44); Provisional Government of the French Republic (1944–46)
- Branch: Free French Naval Forces
- Type: Commando
- Size: Battalion
- Part of: No. 10 (Inter-Allied) Commando
- Engagements: Western Front (World War II); Dieppe Raid; Invasion of Normandy; Battle of Walcheren Causeway

Commanders
- Notable commanders: Philippe Kieffer

Insignia
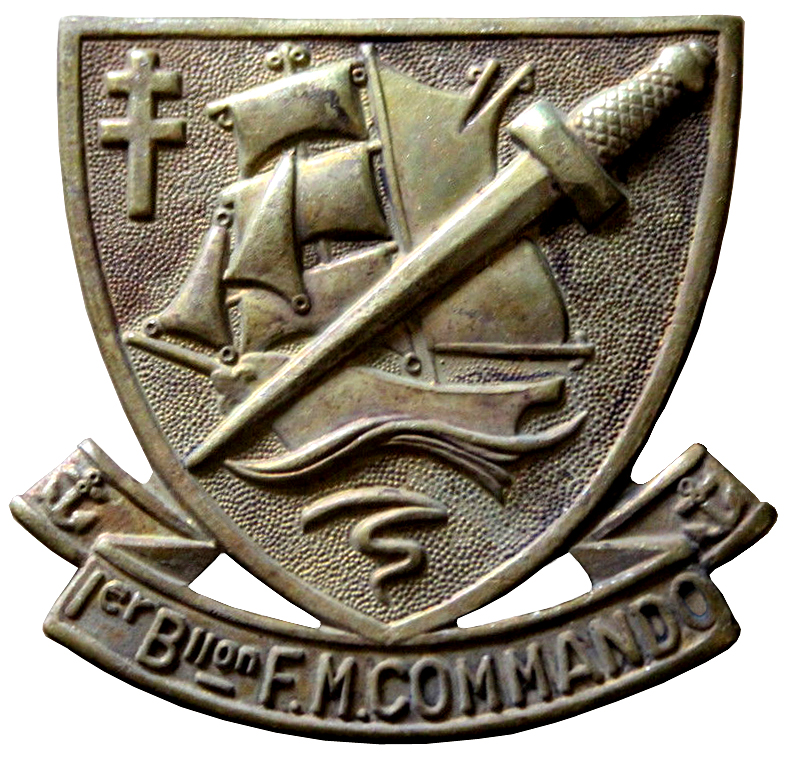
- Identification symbol

1er Bataillon de Fusiliers Marins Commandos was a Fusiliers marins (Sailor Riflemen) commando unit of the Free French Navy, raised in 1942, which served during the Second World War. Its initial Commandant was then-Lieutenant de Vaisseau (Captain) Philippe Kieffer of the Free French Navy, under whose command they participated in the Normandy landings in 1944.

== History ==
=== Formation ===
The creation of the battalion was initially planned for March 1941, but it was delayed until 1942. At this time, Troop 1, "Commandos Français", was formed with the intention of raising the unit to a battalion of 400 personnel in readiness for the expected offensive operations in Europe. Initially, the unit was headquartered in the vicinity of Portsmouth while undergoing training with other units at the Commando Training Centre at Achnacarry, Scotland.

Initially, the battalion was organized into a headquarters section, medical, radio, and transportation sections, and three troops designated 1, 8 and 9, the last being responsible for using the Vickers GO No.2 Mk.1 Land Service machine gun, commonly called the "K-Gun"; 177 men in all. In 1944, the battalion was expanded to three troops, with the Headquarters troop and A & B Troops performing the usual land commando role. A large number of the battalion's personnel came from Brittany.

=== Operations ===
Members of Troop 1, under the command of Lieutenant (Navy) Kieffer, took part in the raid on Dieppe (Operation Jubilee) with the British and Canadian commandos on 19 August 1942. In November 1942, the unit became officially known as the 1ère compagnie de fusiliers marins commandos, with members of the unit participating in Operation Fahrenheit, a night raid on the bridge at Plouézec on 11 and 12 November 1942.

French commandos took part in the raid on the beach of Wassenaar in Holland on 28 February 1944, the site of V-2 rocket launches, during which six of them, including Captain Charles Trepel, were killed.

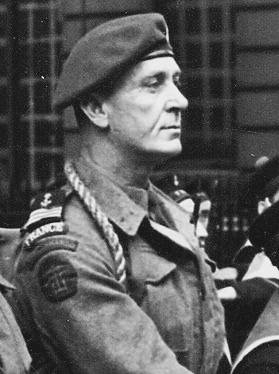
The unit's commanding officer, Philippe Kieffer

In March 1944, the battalion received its official designation, and in May 1944, a few weeks before the Normandy landings, they received their own badge consisting of an ecu of bronze charged with a brig (representing adventure) and the barred dagger of the Commandos with, in the sinistral corner, the Cross of Lorraine and underlined by a streamer carrying the inscription "1er Bn F.M.Commando". The green beret was worn in the British fashion, pulled right with badge over the left eye or temple. The battalion was initially assigned to No.4 Commando of the British Army's 1st Special Service Brigade, serving as its 5th and 6th Troops.

The unit began training for the impending invasion of France in March 1944. In the days that preceded the Normandy landings, the commandos were issued with poor quality photographs of the objectives. Because some of the French commandos were from Normandy, they recognised the sites, which concerned the brigade's British staff. As a result, the Frenchmen were temporarily confined to their camp before the landings.

Promoted June 5, Capitaine de Corvette (Lieutenant Commander) Philippe Kieffer commanded the operations of the 177 men of the 1er Bataillon de Fusiliers Marins Commandos, from June 6 in Normandy. They disembarked from landing craft at 07:31 hours on Sword Beach, on the east of the Allied landing near Colleville-Montgomery. They were the first to be unloaded in this sector with No.4 Commando's landing craft having to let them pass to the lead as initially planned. Their specific objective was to achieve a breach 500 metres (1,600 ft) to the west of Riva Bella in support of the 3rd Infantry Division.

In spite of significant losses, the commandos seized the 50 mm anti-tank gun encuvée – an armoured artillery position like a small bunker – which had disabled LCI 523 (1Re Troop). They then took the former Casino de Riva-Bella before advancing between Colleville and Saint-Aubin-d'Arquenay to meet the British paratroopers of the 6th Airborne Division at Pegasus Bridge (Bénouville), arriving around 16:30 hours. There, the French commandos occupied the perimeter of the lime pit towards 20:00 hours. By the evening of June 6, the 1er BFMC had lost almost 25% of its personnel with 27 killed in combat, and many wounded including their commander Kieffer, who had been wounded twice in the course of the day.

The French Commandos Marine fought in Normandy until 27 August 1944, when the battalion was returned to the United Kingdom for rest and to receive replacements. In November 1944, the 1er BFMC was landed on the island of Walcheren in Holland and took Flessingue as part of a combined arms operation undertaken by the British and Allied commandos. By October 1944, the commando battalion had three companies.

At the end of the Second World War the unit returned to French control, and it currently serves as part of the Naval Commandos of the French Navy. The unit continues to wear the green beret and bronze shield badge.

== Recommended reading ==
- Caroff, Archives de la Marine (France), Les Formations de la marine aux armées, 1939–1945, Marine nationale, Service historique de la Marine, 1953
- Hattu, Guy, Journal d'un commando français: novembre 1943-7 juin 1944 :4-Commando Kiefer, "Troop" 1 Guy Vourc'h, Librarie bleue, 1994
