= Special Operations Command (France) =

Staff overseeing French special forces

- Commandement des opérations spéciales
- Founded: 24 June 1992
- Country: France
- Type: Operational command
- Role: Special operations
- Size: 4,500 authorized personnel
- Part of: Ministry of Armed Forces
- Headquarters: Hexagone Balard, Paris, France
- Nickname: COS

Commanders
- Current commander: Major General Michel Delpit

The Special Operations Command (French: Commandement des Opérations Spéciales, COS; pronounced [kɔmɑ̃dmɑ̃ dez‿ɔpeʁasjɔ̃ spesjal]) is a joint staff charged with overseeing the various special forces of the French Army, Navy and Air and Space Force, bringing them all under a single operational authority. The command is placed under the orders of the Chief of Defence Staff and under the direct authority of the President of the French Republic.

Similar in purpose to the JSOC or UKSF, the COS was created on June 24, 1992. The need for a dedicated command for special operations became apparent after France's participation in the First Gulf War.

== Organisation ==
=== Army ===
- Army Special Forces Command
  - 1st Marine Infantry Parachute Regiment (1^{er} RPIMa)
    - Command and Logistics Company
    - 1 SAS Company - HAHO/HALO paratroopers and divers
    - 2 SAS Company - Extreme environments
    - 3 SAS Company - Vehicle-borne operations
    - 4 SAS Company - Urban warfare
    - Training company
  - 13th Parachute Dragoon Regiment (13^{e} RDP)
    - ECP Squadron - Command and logistics
    - 1^{e} Squadron - Training and evaluation unit nicknamed "Intelligence Academy"
    - 2^{e} Squadron - Combat divers
    - 3^{e} Squadron - Extreme environments
    - 4^{e} Squadron - Vehicle-borne operations
    - 5^{e} Squadron - HAHO/HALO paratroopers
    - 6^{e} Squadron - Signals
    - 7^{e} Squadron - Intelligence
  - 4th Special Forces Helicopter Regiment (4^{e} RHFS)
    - Squadron 1 - equipped with 10 Cougar and 2 Puma helicopters
    - Squadron 2 - equipped with 12 Gazelle helicopters
    - Squadron 3 - equipped with 10 Caracal helicopters
    - Squadron 4 - equipped with 5 Puma helicopters
    - Squadron 5 - equipped with 2 Puma helicopters
    - Squadron 6 - equipped with 6 Tigre helicopters
  - Special Operations Support Group
  - Special Forces Academy

=== Navy ===
Force des Fusiliers Marins et Commandos (FORFUSCO)

- Commandos Marine
  - Commando Hubert - Combat divers, counter-terrorism, and hostage rescue
  - Commando Jaubert - Direct action, counter-terrorism, and hostage rescue
  - Commando Trépel - Direct action, counter-terrorism, and hostage rescue
  - Commando de Penfentenyo - Reconnaissance
  - Commando de Montfort - Reconnaissance
  - Commando Kieffer - Electronic warfare
  - Commando Ponchardier - Operational Support

=== Air and Space Force ===
- Air and Space Force Special Forces Brigade (BFSA)
  - Air Parachute Commando No. 10 - Direct Action & Counter-terrorism
  - Air Parachute Commando n° 30 (CPA 30) - Combat Search and Rescue
- Special Operations Division (DOS)
  - Special Operations Division, Transport section (3/61 Poitou)
  - Special Operations Division, Helicopter section (1/67 Pyrénées) - Integrated into the 4th RHFS.

== See also ==
- GIGN
- List of special forces units
- List of French paratrooper units
- United States Special Operations Command (USSOCOM or SOCOM) - US equivalent command
- United Kingdom Special Forces - British equivalent command
