= Chene =

Chene may refer to:

== People ==
- Chene Lawson (born 1971), American actress
- Chene la Rochelle, Canadian equestrian
- Dixie Chene, American actress
- Henri Le Chêne (1891-?), French wartime agent
- Léon Chené (1905–1992), French racing cyclist
- Marie-Thérèse Le Chêne
- Patrick Chêne (born 1956), French journalist
- Pierre Le Chêne (1900–1979)

== Places ==
- Chêne, Montreux, France
- Chene Park, in the Detroit International Riverfront
- Chêne River, Canada
- Chêne-Arnoult, France
- Chêne-Bernard, France
- Chêne-Bougeries, Switzerland
- Chêne-Bourg, Switzerland
- Chêne-Pâquier, Switzerland
- Chêne-Sec, France
- Chêne-en-Semine, France
- Le Chêne, France
