= Fresnes Prison =

Second largest prison in France

Coordinates: 48°45′49″N 2°19′19″E

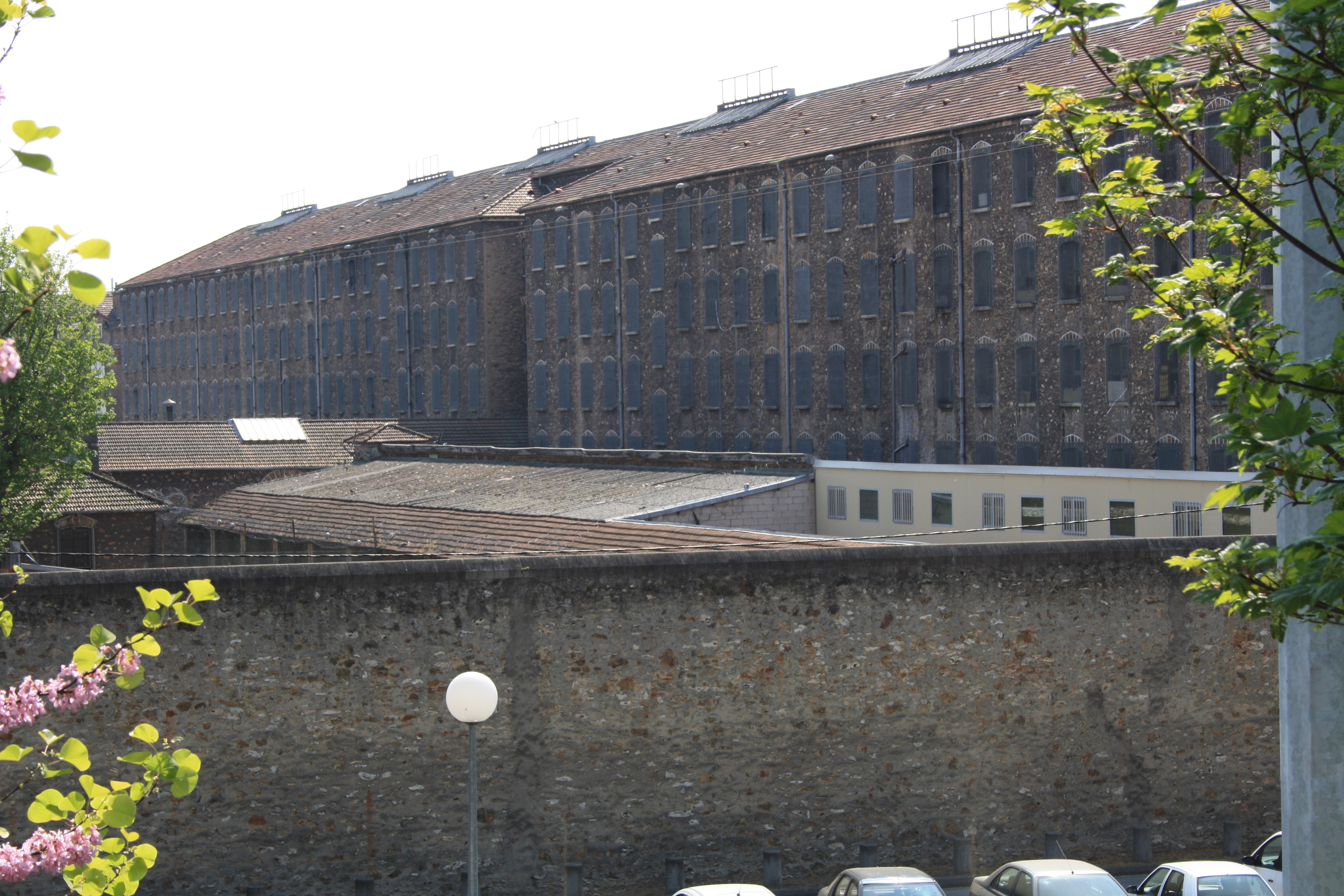
- View of the prison
- Interactive map of Fresnes Prison
- Location: Fresnes, Val-de-Marne

Fresnes Prison (French Centre pénitentiaire de Fresnes) is the second largest prison in France, located in the town of Fresnes, Val-de-Marne, south of Paris. It comprises a large men's prison (maison d'arrêt) of about 1,200 cells, a smaller one for women and a penitentiary hospital.

Fresnes is one of the three main prisons of the Paris area, Fleury-Mérogis (Europe's largest prison) and La Santé (located in Paris) being the other two.

== History ==
The prison was constructed between 1895 and 1898 according to a design devised by architect Henri Poussin. An example of the so-called "telephone-pole design," the facility was radically different from previous prisons. At Fresnes prison, for the first time, cell houses extended crosswise from a central corridor. The design was used extensively in North America for much of the next century.

During World War II, Fresnes prison was used by the Germans to house captured British SOE agents and members of the French Resistance. Held in horrific conditions, many of these prisoners were tortured, and some died there. As soon as the Allied forces broke through at Normandy and fought their way to liberate Paris, the Gestapo peremptorily killed prisoners at Fresnes. Fresnes Prison was liberated on 24 August 1944 by the French 2nd Armoured Division under General Philippe Leclerc, after a day of heavy fighting with many casualties on both sides.

In 1978, the Raymond Barre government vested the prison with a permanent guillotine, intending it to be the only location for all executions in France, with all prisoners under capital convictions being transferred to Fresnes. In February 1981, prisoner Philippe Maurice, transferred to Fresnes' death row the preceding fall, attempted a dramatic escape after help from his lawyer, Brigitte Hammerlin, who smuggled in a pistol for the purpose. Philippe, like the other six prisoners in the condemned cells, was eventually commuted by François Mitterrand following his electoral victory in May, and capital punishment was subsequently abolished in the same year.

== Notable inmates ==
=== Pre-war ===
- Jean Genet (1910–1986), novelist, playwright, poet, essayist, and political activist; for petty theft (late 1930s – early 1940s).

=== World War II ===
- Jack Agazarian, SOE agent, endured torture for six months at Fresnes prison before being moved to Flossenbürg concentration camp where he was held in solitary confinement before being executed on 29 March 1945.
- Berty Albrecht, French campaigner and co-founder of the Combat movement, was tortured and found hanged on May 31, 1943, probably by suicide in order to avoid revealing information to the enemy.
- Roger Bardet, French Resistance operative, who became a double agent, leading to the arrest of Peter Churchill and Odette Sansom; Sidney Jones, Marcel Clech, and Vera Leigh; Henri Frager; Maurice Pertschuk, and Marcus Bloom. Survived.
- Yolande Beekman, SOE F Section agent, executed in Dachau concentration camp.
- Blanche Rubenstein Auzello, American-born wife of Hotel Ritz Paris manager; French resistance operative, incarcerated and tortured; escaped when Nazis deserted Fresnes upon arrival in Paris of Allied troops.
- Marcus Bloom, SOE F Section agent, then to Avenue Foch where he was severely beaten but revealed nothing. In August 1944 he was deported to Mauthausen and executed on 6 November 1944.
- Andrée Borrel, SOE F Section agent, later executed in Natzweiler-Struthof concentration camp.
- Christopher Burney, SOE agent, held in solitary confinement for 15 months and freed in 1945. After the war he published an account of his imprisonment.
- Peter Churchill, SOE F Section agent, arrested with Odette Sansom in April 1943. He was held in Fresnes until 13 February 1944 when he was transferred to Berlin for questioning. On 2 May 1944, he was sent to Sonderlager “A” Sachsenhausen, where he was held in solitary confinement for 318 days out of 11 months. He survived despite being sentenced to death.
- Roman Czerniawski, creator of the Interallie network in France, held in Fresnes prison after his arrest in November 1941. He was released and became a successful double agent.
- Madeleine Damerment, SOE F Section agent, later executed in Dachau concentration camp.
- Edmond Debeaumarché, French Resistance operative, arrested on 3 August 1944 and questioned harshly by the Gestapo at the Rue des Saussaies, He lost consciousness under the beatings but did not divulge any names; subsequently held at Fresnes and then transported by train to Buchenwald on 15 August 1944. Survived.
- Pierre de Schryder, French communist resistance fighter who was imprisoned there in 1943.
- Anatoly Gurevich, Soviet agent of the Red Orchestra who was imprisoned there in January 1943.
- Graham Hayes, a founding member of the Small Scale Raiding Force arrested in September 1942 in Operation Aquatint, was kept in solitary confinement for nine months before his execution by firing squad on 13 July 1943.
- Agnès Humbert, along with other members of the French Resistance, "Groupe du musée de l'Homme", were imprisoned and tried there and sentenced to death. However she was transferred to the Prison de la Santé where the men were executed and the women sentenced to five years slave labour and deported to Anrath prison in Germany. After four years, she was liberated by the Third United States Army in June 1945.
- Phil Lamason, Squadron Leader in the RNZAF was the ranking officer and one of 168 allied airmen imprisoned here in 1944. They were transferred to Buchenwald just days before Paris was liberated, and all but two survived.
- Pierre Laval, former Prime Minister of France, executed for treason on 15 October 1945.
- Pierre Le Chêne, SOE F Section agent, held in solitary confinement to 10 months, then deported to Mauthausen, then Gusen I, liberated on 6 May 1945.
- Vera Leigh, SOE F Section agent, later executed in Natzweiler-Struthof concentration camp.
- André Marsac, French Resistance operative, whose interrogation led to the arrest of Roger Bardet, and subsequently Peter Churchill and Odette Sansom. Survived.
- Raoul Minot (1893–1945), amateur photographer; survived.
- Isidore Newman, SOE F Section agent, arrested on 31 March 1944 and taken to the Gestapo prison in Paris, then Fresnes, and lastly transferred to Mauthausen concentration camp where he was executed on 7 September 1944.
- Alfred and Henry Newton, SOE F Section agents, were held at Fresnes before deportation to Buchenwald where they spent 18 months before being liberated on 11 April 1945.
- Solange de Noailles (Solange d'Ayen), noblewoman and fashion editor of French Vogue, held from 1942 to 1944.
- Sonia Olschanezky, SOE F Section agent, later executed in Natzweiler-Struthof concentration camp.
- Eliane Plewman, SOE F Section agent, later executed in Dachau concentration camp.
- Louis Renault, automobile industrialist, arrested by the provisional French government for collaborating with the Nazis, died in 1944 following alleged mistreatment in Fresnes prison.
- Dr Jean Rousset, chief lieutenant to Virginia Hall in Lyons was held at Fresnes where he was brutally tortured, before being detained for 18 months in Buchenwald before being liberated on 11 April 1945.
- Diana Rowden, SOE F Section agent, later executed in Natzweiler-Struthof concentration camp.
- Yvonne Rudellat, SOE F Section agent, died of typhus in Bergen-Belsen concentration camp a few days after the liberation of the camp by the allies.
- Odette Sansom, SOE F Section agent, arrested with Peter Churchill in April 1943. She was transferred to 84 Avenue Foch, the headquarters of the Sicherheitsdienst, where she was brutally tortured prior to being transported to Ravensbrück but survived despite being sentenced to death.
- Robert Sheppard, SOE F Section agent, successively held in Fresnes prison and then concentration camps of Neue Bremm, Mauthausen, Natzweiler-Struthof, and Dachau. Released by US troops on 29 April 1945.
- Charles Skepper, SOE organiser of the "Monk" circuit. He was arrested in March 1944, severely tortured by the Gestapo, transported to Fresnes and then to Compiegne prison. His death, possibly at Buchenwald concentration camp, was officially recognised by the War Office as ‘died while in enemy hands on or shortly after 1 April 1944'
- Suzanne Spaak, French Resistance operative, was executed there on 12 August 1944, less than two weeks before the city was liberated.
- John Starr, SOE F Section agent, captured on 18 July 1943 and transferred to Fresnes where he was shot and wounded while attempting to escape, then tortured, then transferred to 84 Avenue Foch. In 1944, he was transferred to Sachsenhausen concentration camp, and released at the end of the war.
- Brian Stonehouse, SOE F Section agent, arrested on 24 October 1941 and held in solitary confinement in Castres prison while subjected to frequent and brutal interrogations. Then transferred to Fresnes prison and further interrogated. Later sent to Mauthausen concentration camp, and in mid-1944, transferred to Natzweiler-Struthof concentration camp. He saved his own life by drawing sketches for the camp commandant, guards and their families.
- F. F. E. Yeo-Thomas, SOE F Section agent, arrested in February 1943, tortured in 84 Avenue Foch then transferred to Fresnes where he made two failed attempts to escape, then transferred to Compiègne prison, then Buchenwald where he made a brief escape. On his recapture, he was sent to Stalag XX-B, near Marienburg.
- Edward Zeff, SOE F Section agent, arrested in February 1943 and sent successively to Fresnes, then a prison in Prague, Mauthausen concentration camp, then Melk where he was condemned to receive fifty lashes before being hanged, but escaped death having befriended one of the camp Kommandants; finally, again at Mauthausen, where he was the only British Jew who was there at the time of the liberation by the Americans in 1945. He had been brutally tortured over three months but revealed no information to the Nazis.

=== Post war ===
- Robert Alesch, one of the most deadly double agents in World War II, was held in Fresnes prison prior to his execution on 25 February 1949.
- James Baldwin, American cultural icon and writer, was interned at Fresnes during Christmas of 1949 after being found by police sleeping in a hostel with a bed sheet that an acquaintance had loaned him for the night. The acquaintance had stolen the bedsheet from a different hotel.
- Philippe Maurice, the last criminal whose sentence of death (in France) was upheld by the Court of Cassation, in 1981, and who attempted a dramatic escape shortly after, which failed.
- Paul Touvier, French Nazi collaborator during World War II, was imprisoned in 1989 for his war crimes and died of prostate cancer in 1996 at the Fresnes prison hospital.
- Antonio Ferrara, Italian mobster, who broke out of the prison in March 2003 in a commando-style raid. Members of his gang attacked the prison with rocket launchers and assault rifles, and they set fire to nearby cars in what is believed to have been intended as a distraction. Arrested again four months later, Ferrara is now imprisoned in Fleury-Mérogis.

== Modern day ==
Fresnes Prison has recently experienced many rebellions and arson incidents.
