= Victor Gerson =

British SOE agent

Haim Victor Gerson DSO, LdH (1896 – 14 April 1983), code name Rene, was a British Special Operations Executive (SOE) agent during the Second World War. He organised the Vic escape line in France. Escape lines helped Allied soldiers and airmen, SOE agents, and other people in danger to escape from Nazi-occupied Europe, usually by crossing the Pyrenees mountains into neutral Spain.

== Early years ==
Haim Victor Gerson was born in August 1896 in Southport, Lancashire as Haim Gershon Cohen, the son of a fabric merchant. He was educated in England, then in Constantinople (Istanbul) and attended Manchester University

=== World War I ===
Gerson joined the British army at the declaration of war and was sent to the Western Front In France and took part in the Battle of the Somme. in the King's Liverpool regiment, promoted to Corporal, but was recalled to England for eventually joining in the secret services because of his knowledge in languages, however when it was discovered that his father still had Turkish nationality, therefore an enemy alien, he spent the rest of the war in a labour battalion in Northern France and demoted to private. His original battalion, within the King's Liverpool regiment was decimated.

After the war, Gerson went to Paris where he was a dealer in fine rugs and carpets. He married Marcelle Nahoum, the daughter of the chief rabbi of Egypt, Haim Nahoum Effendi, and had a son, but both wife and son were killed in an automobile accident. He then married Giliana Balmaceda, a Chilean-born actress, and they both joined the SOE.

=== World War II ===
On 18 June 1940 four days before the signing of the armistice between Germany and a defeated France, the couple escaped to England where both joined the Special Operations Executive. In May 1941 Balmaceda was the first female SOE agent to be sent to France. She went to Vichy France, the southern, unoccupied part of France, and collected information and administrative documents used in France, such as ration cards, which could be reproduced in England for use by agents on clandestine missions in France.

==== First mission ====
On the night of the 6/7 September 1941 Gerson was parachuted from a Whitley bomber, along with five other agents and landed near the Le Cerisier farm of Auguste Chantraine, Mayor of Tendu. He travelled to Lyon and Marseille, where he assessed the possibility of organising subversive networks in cities. In October, he avoided arrest in Marseille as he was wary of the voice that gave him an appointment by phone, did not go there. He quickly left France and returned to London thanks to the help of Josep Rovira i Canals and his Service d'Evasion. When he arrived in London, he reported on his conclusions on the French willingness to resist the German occupation.

==== Second mission ====
He was sent back in the field to set up a safe escape route through France into Spain using the personal connection to Josep Rovira.

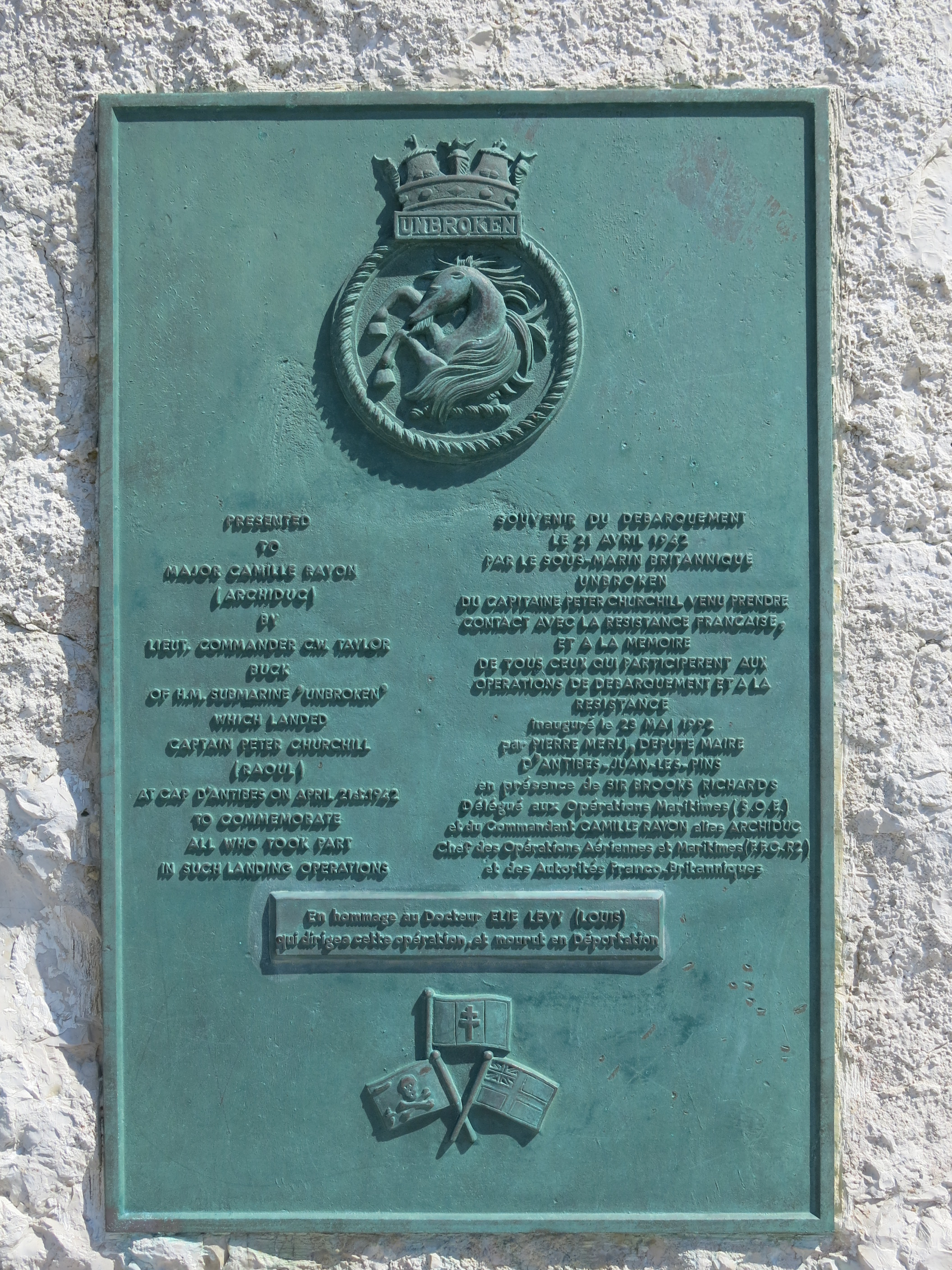
Monument commemorating the landing of Capt. Peter Churchill from HMS Unbroken at Cap d'Antibes on 21 April 1942

In Operation DELAY II Peter Churchill’s mission was to land four SOE agents on the French Riviera by submarine. On 26 February 1942 Churchill flew from Bristol to Gibraltar with two radio operators, Isidore Newman «Julien» for the URCHIN network and Edward Zeff «Matthieu» for the SPRUCE network, where they were joined by Marcel Clech «Bastien», radio operator for the AUTOGIRO network, and Victor Gerson «René», an SOE agent on a special mission to organise the VIC Escape Line. They travelled in HM Submarine P 42 “Unbroken” to Antibes where on the night of 21 April 1942 Churchill took Newman and Zeff and their radios to the shore by canoe, and led them to their contact Dr Élie Lévy. Churchill then returned to the submarine and dropped off Clech and Gerson by canoe at Pointe d’Agay near Fréjus

Gerson and Clech went to Lyon where they met with SOE agent and American Virginia Hall. Gerson gradually built up an escape network to Spain with Lazare Rachline (Lucien Rachet) and Georges Levin, with Thérèse Mitrani in Lyon, René Feraggi in Marseille, and Jacques Mitterrand in Paris. He also installed groups in Perpignan, under Josep Rovira and responsible for the border crossings and Montpellier.

Gerson entrusted to Rachline the task of exfiltrating the 11 SOE agents after they escaped from Mauzac prison on 16 July 1942 and made their way through Spain to England. The escaping agents included Michael Trotobas and Georges Bégué.

On 19/20 August 1943 Gerson returned by plane to England, and on 14 September returned to France in a Hudson bomber which landed in France and was met by Henri Déricourt.

===== Operating rules =====
Gerson imposed strict rules on his members within the VIC escape line:

- Members are known and designated only by pseudonyms.
- The homes of regular members of the network are kept secret.
- New members of the organisation give up all their former clandestine activities.
- Any regular member breaks contact with his family and leaves the house where he lived before entering the network.
- It is forbidden to carry papers or notes that give the names or addresses of contacts.
- The verbal messages between the informant and the organiser through the mail are in hackneyed language, which the couriers cannot understand.
- When a message cannot be in hazy language or the courier cannot remember it, it is written on fine tissue paper, inserted in a cigarette or carried so that it can be easily eaten or thrown away.
- Passwords had to be given, word perfect, otherwise they would not be accepted.
- Members in safe houses are not allowed to go out under any circumstances before it is time to depart.
- Members should never visit a safe home without first checking the security of the house by phone.

Despite the circuit being penetrated three times by the Gestapo in June and October 1943 and January 1944, in which some members were arrested, the group was able to continue its activities.

Gerson was arrested once while travelling on a train between Paris and Lyons, however his cover story was so convincing he was soon released.

During the war he was infiltrated into France six times.

== Post war ==
After the Second World War, Gerson returned to Paris. He divorced his second wife, and then remarried Yvonne Morin. He resumed his business activity in fine rugs and carpets. He died in 1983 at Neuilly-sur-Seine, France.

== Recognition ==
=== Distinctions ===
- United Kingdom: Distinguished Service Order (DSO), Member of the Order of the British Empire (MBE)
- France: Chevalier de la Légion d'honneur

=== Monument ===
- A stone monument at Le Cerisier, Tendu (Indre) commemorates the clandestine parachute landing on 6 September 1941.

== External sources ==
- MRD Foot, English in the Resistance. British Secret Service of Action (SOE) in France 1940-1944,
- MRD Foot, Six Faces of Courage, Eyre Methuen, 1978
- Sir Brooks Richards, Secret Flotillas. Clandestine links in France and North Africa, 1940-1944.
- EG Boxshall, Chronology of SOE operations with the resistance in France during World War II, 1960.
- The National Archives HS 9/575/4
