= Marcus Bloom =

British espionage agent

Marcus Reginald Bloom (24 September 1907 – 6 September 1944) was a British Special Operations Executive agent during the Second World War.

== Early life ==
Bloom was born in 1907 in Brick Lane, Whitechapel (as per his birth certificate) but the family later moved to Tottenham, London, the son of Harry Pizer Bloom and Anna Sadie Davidoff Bloom, in an orthodox Jewish home. He helped out working at his father’s cinema in Wandsworth, their mail order textile firm, or in their restaurant business.

In the 1930s his father sent him Paris to run the mail-order business, and he became fluent in French. The firm closed after five years and he returned to London and married in March 1938.

== World War II ==
He served in the Royal Artillery in 1941 and joined the Special Operations Executive in February 1942.

On the night of 3/4 November 1942 he was landed at Port Miou, near Cassis in southern France, with SOE agents George Starr, organiser of WHEELWRIGHT; Mary Herbert, courier for SCIENTIST; Marie-Thérèse Le Chêne, courier for SPRUCE; and Odette Sansom for SPINDLE.

Bloom was sent to France to work for Anthony Brooks, but Brooks rejected him because of concerns about his lack of security. Instead, Bloom became the wireless operator in the PRUNUS network organised by Maurice Pertschuk, with Philippe de Gunzbourg as courier. Bloom worked very successfully and sent and received many messages to and from London (estimated at over fifty), having to keep constantly on the move to avoid the German radio detection vans. He also assisted in sending and receiving messages for Starr in the WHEELWRIGHT network.

Philippe de Gunzbourg noted that Pertschuk had a reckless lack of security, with resistance leaders sharing tables in black-market restaurants in Toulouse and speaking in English, and on 12 April 1943 Pertschuk, Bloom, and several of their key colleagues were arrested. They were possibly betrayed by double agent Roger Bardet. The network collapsed though de Gunzbourg escaped and transferred to the WHEELWRIGHT network. Pertschuk was deported to Buchenwald and executed.

Bloom was taken to Fresnes prison and Avenue Foch in Paris and severely beaten but revealed nothing. In August 1944 he was deported to Mauthausen and executed on 6 September 1944.

The risk of sending to the Field this officer with his imperfect French and his Anglo-Saxon Jewish appearance was only justified by an extreme penury of WT operators. He was very courageous and fought to the finish….it is clear he did a good job for many months.

— The National Archives : HS 9/166/7 – Marcus BLOOM

== Recognition ==
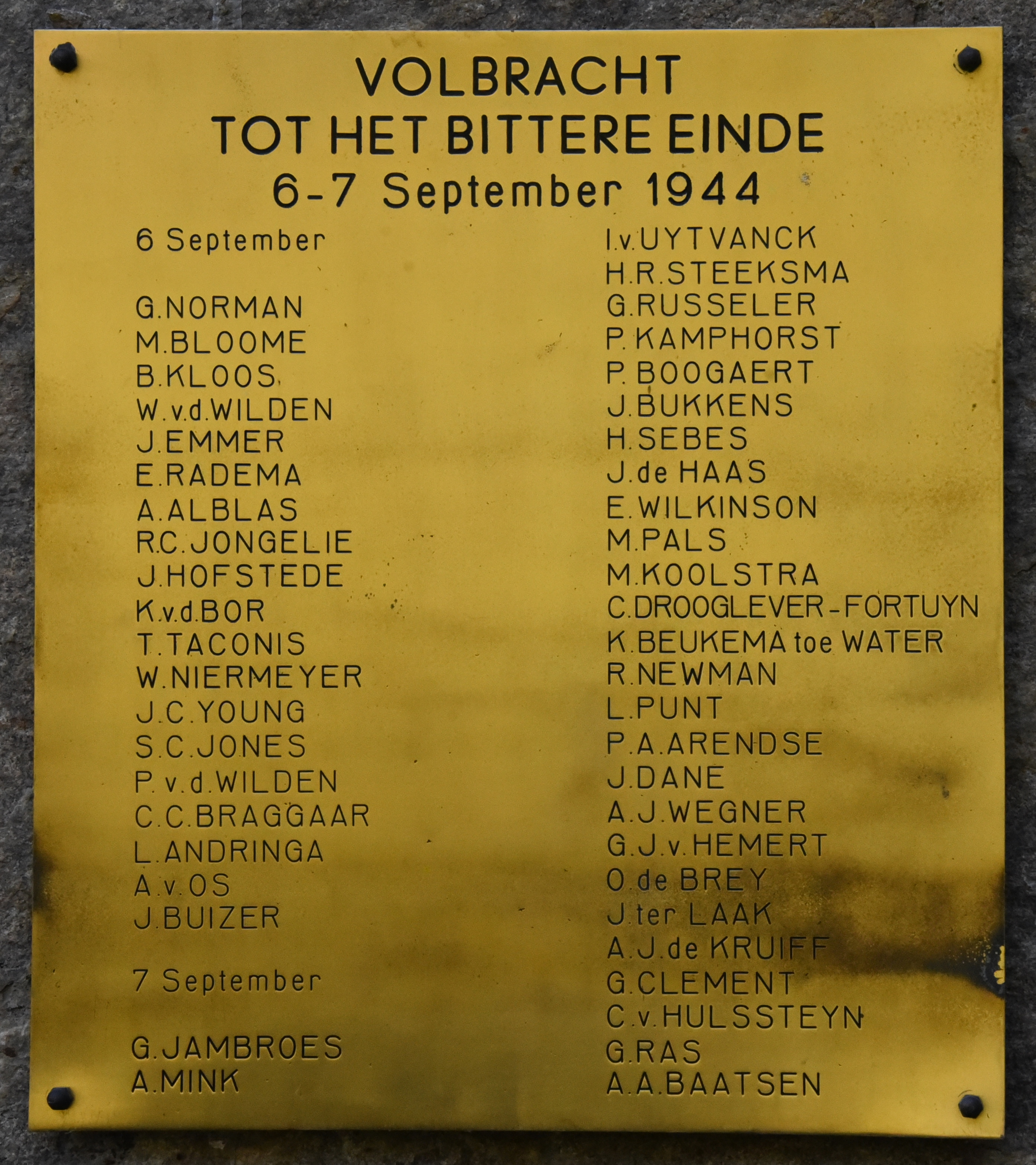
memorial plaque in Mauthausen

=== Awards ===
- United Kingdom: Mentioned in Despatches

=== Monuments ===
- He is honoured at The Valençay SOE Memorial, Indre, as one of the 104 agents of section F who lost their lives for France’s liberation.
- Brookwood Memorial, Surrey. Panel 21 Column 3.
- On a plaque on his mother’s grave at Edmonton Federation Synagogue cemetery, Montague Road, London.
- On the War Memorial of the St John’s Wood Synagogue in Grove End Road, London.
- Memorial at Mauthausen camp.
- A memorial plaque at Brownlow Court, Hampstead, erected in 2022 by the Jewish American Society for Historic Preservation and AJEX -U.K.

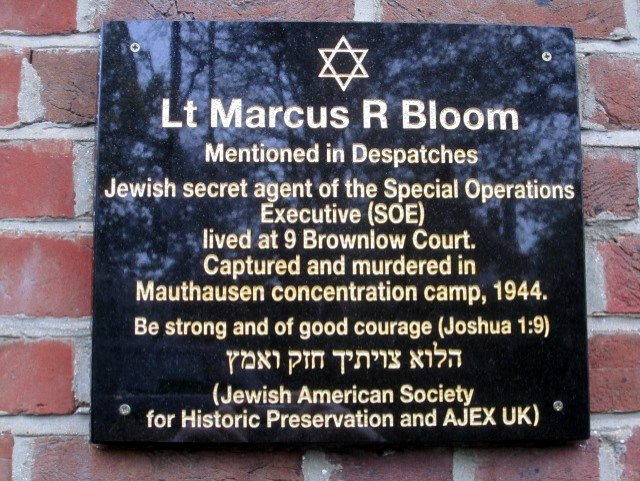
Historical Marker on building he lived in before deployment.

Lt Marcus R Bloom, Mentioned in Despatches.
Jewish secret agent of the Special Operations Executive (SOE)
lived at 9 Brownlow Court.
Captured and murdered in Mauthausen Concentration Camp, 1944.
Be Strong and of Good Courage (Joshua 1:9)
(Jewish American Society for Historic Preservation and AJEX U.K.)
