= Michael Trotobas =

British espionage agent

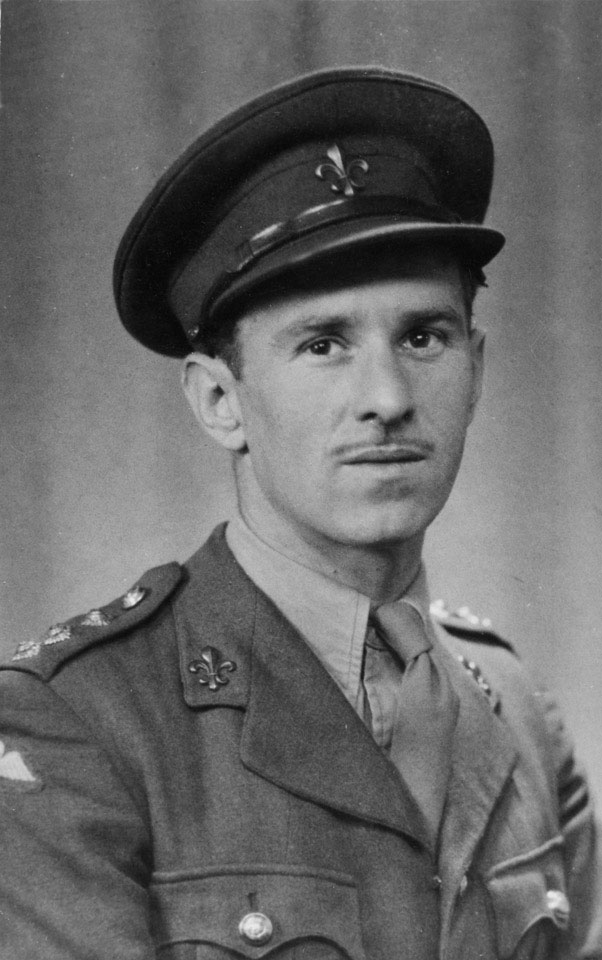
- Michael Trotobas, September 1942
- Born: Michael Albert Raymond Trotobas; 20 May 1914; Brighton, England
- Died: 27 November 1943 (aged 29); Lille, France
- Other names: Sylvestre, Capitaine Michel
- Military career
- Allegiance: United Kingdom
- Branch: British Army; Special Operations Executive
- Service years: 1933–1943
- Rank: Captain
- Conflicts: World War II

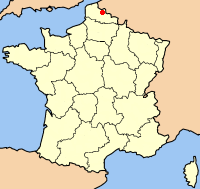
Trotobas operated in and around the city of Lille.

Michael Alfred Raymond Trotobas (20 May 1914 – 27 November 1943), code named Sylvestre and known in France as Capitaine Michel, was an agent of the United Kingdom's clandestine Special Operations Executive (SOE) organization during World War II in France. The purpose of SOE was to conduct espionage, sabotage, and reconnaissance in countries occupied by the Axis powers, especially Nazi Germany. SOE agents allied themselves with resistance groups and supplied them with weapons and equipment parachuted in from England.

Trotobas's first mission to France in September 1941 ended with his arrest by Vichy police and imprisonment for several months until he and other SOE agents escaped in July 1942. On his second mission from November 1942 until November 1943, he created, organised, and led the Farmer network (or circuit), sometimes called the Sylvestre-Farmer network, based in Lille. He led many successful sabotage operations before being betrayed by a member of his network and killed in a gun battle with the German military police.

Typically, SOE agents worked with local resistance leaders, assisting and influencing them but not directly commanding resistance groups and fighters. However, "Capitaine Michel" was both the creator and the commander of the Farmer network, "an accomplished organiser, an audacious saboteur, and an inspirational leader". He headed a "powerful circuit of more than 800 resisters of the German occupation, with an escape line, an intelligence gathering service, and numerous parachute reception grounds."

== Early life ==
Trotobas was born 20 May 1914 in Brighton, England the son of Henri Trotobas, originally from the Provence region of France, and Agnes Whelan from near Dublin, Ireland. He grew up in near poverty. In 1933, he joined the Middlesex Regiment. He became a weapons instructor, a good swimmer, and the regiment's light heavyweight boxing champion. In 1939 he and his regiment were sent to France at the beginning of World War II. He commanded a platoon as a Platoon sergeant major and was wounded during the Dunkirk Evacuation in 1940. Commended for bravery, he was commissioned as a Second Lieutenant on 10 January 1941.

== Special Operations Executive ==
Trotobas came to the attention of SOE because of his ability to speak French and on 2 April 1941 became a member of the organization. During his training he was generally praised by his instructors; his "guts and determination," leadership qualities, and military experience were cited, although he was also considered "impetuous" and impatient. At the completion of his training he was promoted to captain.

=== First mission ===
Trotobas parachuted into France on the night of 6/7 September 1941 as part of a group of six SOE agents who scattered after landing near Tendu in Indre Department. At this early stage in the history of SOE, his primary task was exploratory, looking for opportunities to create, organize, and supply with arms and equipment the fledgling French Resistance. The Vichy police, however, had become aware of the SOE agents infiltrating their territory and, captured a dozen agents, nearly all the agents present in Vichy (unoccupied) France.

Trotobas was arrested on 27 October in Châteauroux.

==== Prison and escape ====
Trotobas and the other SOE agents were first imprisoned in poor conditions in Périgueux, but in March 1942, thanks to the intervention of the American consulate, they were transferred to an internment camp of 2,000 internees near Mauzac-et-Grand-Castang in the Dordogne region of southern France where conditions were much better. The SOE agents began planning an escape, assisted on the outside by SOE agent Virginia Hall and Gaby Bloch, wife of the prisoner Jean-Pierre Bloch. Trotobas's role in planning the escape was to lead the SOE agents in daily exercise sessions to get them physically fit for the challenges they would face after the escape.

On 15 July 1942, eleven SOE agents escaped the prison. Trotobas led the way, carrying a strip of carpet to lay down on the ground and trailing a ball of string behind him for signaling—-one twitch for okay, three for danger to the prisoners who followed him, one by one. He unfastened the lower strands of the double barbed-wire fence to permit the prisoners to crawl under. At one point a French guard came within 6 metres (20 ft) of Trotobas, who was prepared to kill the guard if necessary. Instead the guard asked who was escaping and when told that it was the English agents, told Trotobas not to make so much noise and walked away. All eleven SOE agents escaped and, after hiding in the woods while an intense manhunt took place, made their way in small groups to meet up with Hall in Lyon by 11 August. From there, they were smuggled to Spain and Portugal assisted by Victor Gerson and thence back to England. The official historian of SOE, M. R. D. Foot, called the escape "one of the war's most useful operations of its kind." Several of the escapees returned later to France and become leaders of SOE networks.

=== Second mission ===
Trotobas arrived in London on 17 September 1942. On the night of 17/18 November he was back in France, landing by parachute near the town of Montargis, 100 kilometres (62 miles) south of Paris. Landing with him was his wireless operator, Arthur Staggs. The two men were to set up the Farmer Circuit in Lille. Anti-German feeling ran high in Lille, which remembered the German occupation of World War I. Lille was an industrial center with communist-led trade unions dedicated in their resistance to the Germans after the German invasion of the Soviet Union in June 1941. Lille was also important in German defenses for the coast of northern France, including air bases and anti-aircraft batteries. Unlike many SOE agents whose priority at that time in the war was to gather intelligence and arm and organize resistance groups, Trotobas's job was explicitly sabotage. His priority was railroads.

In his arrival by parachute, most of Trotobas's baggage and equipment was lost and he arrived in Lille with only a small pistol and 250,000 French francs (about 1,250 British pounds). Moreover, he arrived in Lille knowing nobody and with no contacts, but with a knowledge of the city due to his military service. He made the rounds of bars and gambling dens, activities he enjoyed, spending money freely while recruiting people for the resistance among the "less savory" elements of the society, people who understood "the importance of keeping their mouths shut." Many of his best associates were Poles who were refugees from the German occupation of their country.

Trotobas's first recruit was Emmanuel Lemercier, a bookseller and a former French soldier with extensive contacts, who he met during a card game. He also met Denise Gilman, a 22-year-old waitress, who became his "hard-working courier, steadfast companion, lover, and confidant." By late January 1943 he had recruited about 20 persons, including Pierre Séailles, 23 years old and a friend from the Mauzac prison, who became his deputy. By August 1943, the Farmer network had more than 800 members scattered over a wide area in northwestern France. Trotobas established his headquarters, which became a bee-hive of activity, in a back room of the Aquarium Cafe owned by Madeleine Thirou near the center of Lille. Trotobas often dressed in the uniform of a French policeman.

Trotobas insisted that each of his recruits be fully informed of the risks he or she was taking, sign an oath pledging to follow orders and never to reveal information about the network and its members, and agree to a 17-item list of duties and obligations. Members of the network were identified only by number or code name, never by real name. Trotobas also kept his location and travels secret from all but a few sector and group leaders. Trotobas's organization was "an illustration of his meticulous planning and attention to detail."

By October 1943, Trotobas had established seven geographic sectors of the Farmer network, each with its leader and all under his supervision. The Farmer network also supported an escape line, helping downed allied airmen and stranded soldiers escape France to Spain. A young black-marketeer named Pierre Duval headed the escape line which was based in the city of Abbeville.

==== Sabotage ====
In February 1943, Trotobas organized his first successful sabotage mission, derailing 40 railway cars and closing the railroad for two days. Over the following months, his growing army of supporters began to carry out 15 to 20 derailments per week, creating delays is the supply of military goods to the large German forces in the Lille region. His largest sabotage operation was the night of 27/28 June 1943 when Trotobas, with a forged Gestapo identification card, and 20 men dressed in gendarmerie uniforms talked their way into the locomotive works in Lille and destroyed four million litres of oil and damaged 22 transformers. The operation demonstrated to SOE in London that sabotage was a viable alternative to air bombing raids which inevitably killed French citizens and jeopardized French support for the allies. The Royal Air Force had attempted unsuccessfully four times to bomb the factory.

In London the Ministry of Economic Warfare and the Air Ministry were skeptical of Trotobas's claim of a successful operation and rather than offer congratulations requested photographs of the bombed factory, no easy task as the Germans were now "rounding up railway workers, racing through working class districts in their squad cars, and smashing in the doors to drag out wives and children as hostages." Trotobas gained access to the factory with a forged pass identifying him as an official of an insurance agency, persuaded the Germans investigating the ruins to help him take photographs, and sent the photos to London. When the Air Ministry opened the package of photos it found a card saying "With the compliments of the Resistance."

==== Weaknesses ====
SOE networks were more secure in rural areas which had a much lighter presence of German soldiers and milice, the pro-German French militia, than industrial cities such as Lille, especially as Lille was near the coastline that was a likely spot for an allied invasion of France. The dense population and large German presence near Lille made it an especially dangerous place to work. It was also difficult to find isolated rural sites for clandestine air drops of arms and equipment. The RAF was reluctant to undertake supply missions near Lille due to the heavy volume of anti-aircraft fire that greeted its aircraft. The distant sites of the air drops meant that the Farmer circuit had to transport supplies by road to its scattered groups, a hazardous undertaking. Moreover, communications with London were difficult and infrequent. The wireless operator assigned to Farmer, Arthur Staggs, proved to be of little use due to a defective radio and, until it was replaced, had to rely on neighbouring circuits to make contact with London and receive the vital messages needed to enable parachute drops of explosives and supplies. For communication, arms, supplies, and money Trotobas was initially forced to rely on what the Prosper network in Paris would give him. Later, wireless operator Yolande Beekman of the Musician network located in Saint-Quentin, a hazardous journey of 60 kilometres (37 miles) south of Lille, communicated with London for the Farmer network. Due to the problem with communications, the first airdrop of supplies for the Farmer network was not until 13 April 1943.

Most successful SOE agents maintained a low profile, but Trotobas had both notoriety and a penchant for risk taking. He frequented bars, sought out women companions, and spent freely. Often while drinking he would leave the bar and go out to the street and fire his Sten gun into the air to unnerve the German soldiers in the town. A close associate told the story of how he once confronted a German officer in a jewelry store, displayed the two revolvers he carried, and challenged the officer to try to oppose him. The German declined the challenge.

== Downfall ==
On 23 June 1943, a young SOE agent and saboteur named François Reeve, code named "Olivier," joined Trotobas in Lille. Trotobas assigned him to take charge of the Arras sector of the Farmer network, but Reeve upset the tight-knit group heading the Farmer network. Reeve was described by Trotobas's deputy Pierre Séailles as "not up to the job" and by others as "boastful and vain, not particularly intelligent" and jealous of the reputation of Trotobas. He was also called "the human arsenal" for his habit of carrying two or three revolvers on his person. Also in June came the destruction of the Prosper network in Paris by the Germans. Prosper was the largest SOE network in France and its demise eliminated many of the people and resources needed by SOE networks in northern France.

In July and August came a series of arrests and betrayals by key leaders and associates of the Farmer network. Trotobas was reported by an associate to be traveling with two bodyguards, smoking incessantly, losing weight, and "on the verge of a breakdown." He was in bed sick for a few days. With the Germans now aware of him, Trotobas changed his appearance by dying his blond hair black, shaving his mustache, and wearing the uniform of a pro-German paramilitary organization, the Groupe mobile de réserve. Denise Gilman also changed her appearance

A growing problem for Trotobas was his first recruit to the Farmer network, Emmanuel Lemercier, who resented being pushed out of the position of deputy to Trotobas and became increasingly erratic, making threats to other members of Farmer that he was going to betray them to the Germans. Trotobas planned to send Lemercier to England to get him out of the way, but before that could happen, Reeve executed Lemercier on 3 November 1943. Reeve would later claim that the execution was ordered by Trotobas.

Despite the internal strife, Trotobas continued to lead sabotage missions and collect parachuted arms for the resistance. In early November 1944, the Farmer Network carried out four derailments of trains in five days leaving the line "absolutely littered" with damaged railway equipment. However, on 12 November, an associate named Yvonne Pachy saw him and said he was gaunt, exhausted, suffering from pneumonia, and pessimistic, telling her that he might not see her again. On 24 November Denise Gilman was also ill (possibly pregnant) and Trotobas stayed with her in an apartment that he feared might not be safe, but with the German crackdown, the pair seemed to have run out of hideouts in Lille.

Early in the morning of 27 November, François Reeve was captured by the Germans without a fight and roughly interrogated. SOE's guidance to captured agents who were being tortured was to try to remain silent for at least 48 hours to allow their colleagues and associates time to change locations and cover their tracks. Reeve lasted less than 2 hours between his capture and leading the Germans to the house where Trotobas was staying, although Reeve later said he believed that Trotobas would not be present in the house. Trotobas was in fact there and at 7 a.m. the German military police broke into the house. Trotobas resisted and killed the leader of the German raiders and wounded another German before being killed himself. His courier and lover Denise Gilman was shot in the stomach and died half an hour later.

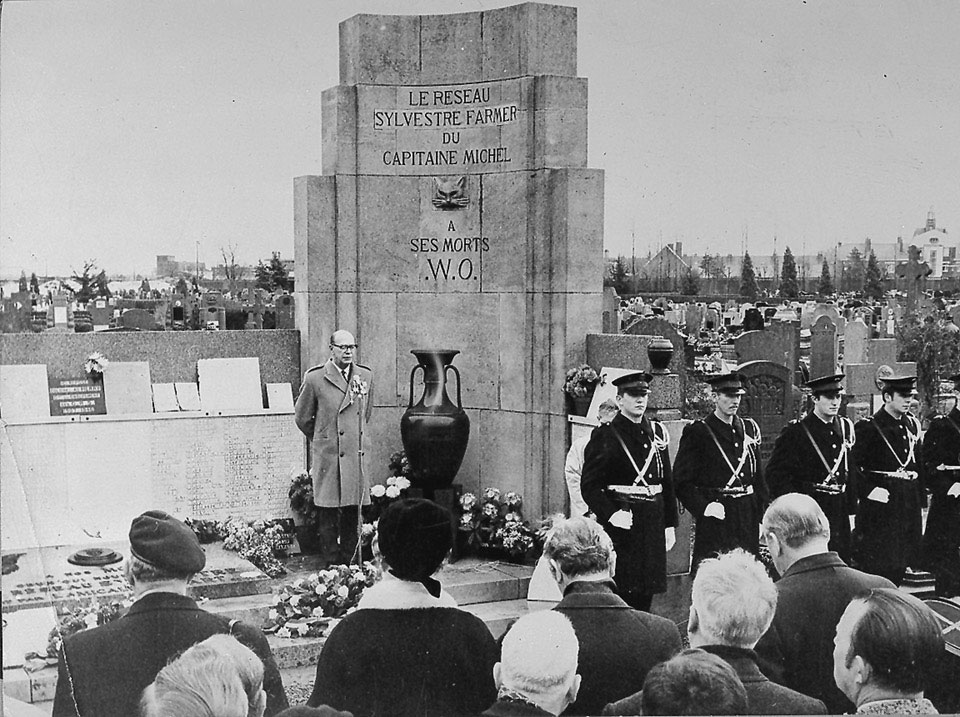
The monument to the Sylvestre Farmer Network of Capitaine Michel in Lille.

A later court of inquiry in England concluded that Reeve was not guilty of deliberate disloyalty, "but it cannot be said in his favour that he showed as much consistency and firmness of character when being maltreated by the Germans as has been shown by a great many other agents in similar circumstances."

== Legacy ==
The Farmer circuit did not die with Michael Trotobas. Pierre Séailles become the leader and a report to SOE said that "the threads of the organization....remain unbroken and ready for the resumption of activity." A few days after Trotobas's death, the Farmer circuit destroyed 11 locomotives at Tourcoing. The casualties of the Farmer circuit were heavy. Of its 800 to 1,000 members, more than 300 were killed in action, executed, or disappeared in German concentration camps during 1943 and 1944.

Trotobas was declared ineligible for a Victoria Cross as no senior officer was present to report on his actions. Thus, he received no commendation from Britain, but France posthumously gave him the Medal of Resistance. After World War II in Lille an organization was formed called the "French Association of Friends of Captain Michel." Annually until the 1990s a delegation of the Middlesex Regiment visited Lille and the house where Trotobas was killed. The citizens of Lille named a street and a housing estate after him and a plaque at 20 Boulevard de Belfort, the site of the house where he was killed, commemorates him and his "devoted collaborator" Denise Gilman. A large monument to the "Sylvestre-Farmer network of Capitaine Michel" is in a cemetery in Lille. In 2018, a blue plaque honoring his memory was unveiled at the site of his birth in Brighton.
