= Pierre de Schryder =

French Resistance fighter (1909–1945)

- Born: 12 October 1913; Beauvais, French Third Republic
- Died: 16 May 1953 (aged 39); Paris, France
- Occupation: salesman
- Organization: FTP
- Political party: French Communist Party
- Movement: French Resistance
- Spouse: Yvonne Goujon

Pierre de Schryder (October 12, 1913 in Beauvais; - May 16, 1953 in Paris) was a French Communist resistance fighter. He was active in the Francs-tireurs et partisans (FTP) under the nom de guerre "Jacquemin" and was sentenced to death, but escaped.

== Biography ==
=== Professional career ===
De Schryder worked as a salesman in the Paris market halls and also served as personnel commissioner of the FTP in Region R X (formerly R 75) in 1943. At the age of 31, he became the leader of the resistance organisation Francs-tireurs et partisans (FTP) in Paris.

=== Arrest, torture and death sentence ===
On 19 November 1943, as he was on his way to a meeting in Combs-la-Ville, de Schryder was arrested by the French police. He happened to meet Georges Nicol, a regional recruiter, and Leon Cledat, a political leader who had been injured during an escape attempt. After his arrest, de Schryder was taken to the Paris prefecture, where he was tortured for three days without revealing any information. On 14 December 1943, de Schryder was handed over to the German occupation authorities and taken to Fresnes Prison. There he was court-martialled together with 26 other resistance fighters. Twenty of them were sentenced to death, including de Schryder.

=== Trial and escape ===
The trial against de Schryder and his comrades-in-arms began on 20 March 1944 and lasted four days. After the judgement, the prisoners were allowed to see their families one last time and received food parcels.

On 11 April 1944, de Schryder and his fellow prisoners were transferred to another cell, where they were told that their appeals for clemency had been rejected and that they were to be shot at 3 pm. During the transport to the place of execution, the Mont Valérien, fortress, de Schryder managed to free himself from his handcuffs and jump off the lorry transporting him and escape.

=== After the escape ===
De Schryder's escape aroused suspicion among his comrades-in-arms, who feared that he was an informer and that the escape had been faked. In December 1943, for example, FTP member Joseph Dawidowicz was executed as a traitor by the Resistance after claiming to have escaped. Eventually, however, reports that German security forces in Suresnes, where de Schryder had escaped, were combing houses for an escaped prisoner, as well as de Schryder's good reputation in the Resistance, meant that his version was believed, and his escape was henceforth celebrated in Communist circles as an act of resistance. After the Liberation of Paris, the newspaper L’Humanité reported on de Schryder's "miraculous escape" in its editions of 4 and 5 October 1944 and published a picture showing him with the handcuffs he had taken off during his escape.

De Schryder continued his work in the communist press and later worked for L'Humanité, where he continued to be honoured as a symbol of resistance to the Nazi occupation in France.
