= Marcel Clech =

French WW2 SOE espionage agent (1905-1944)

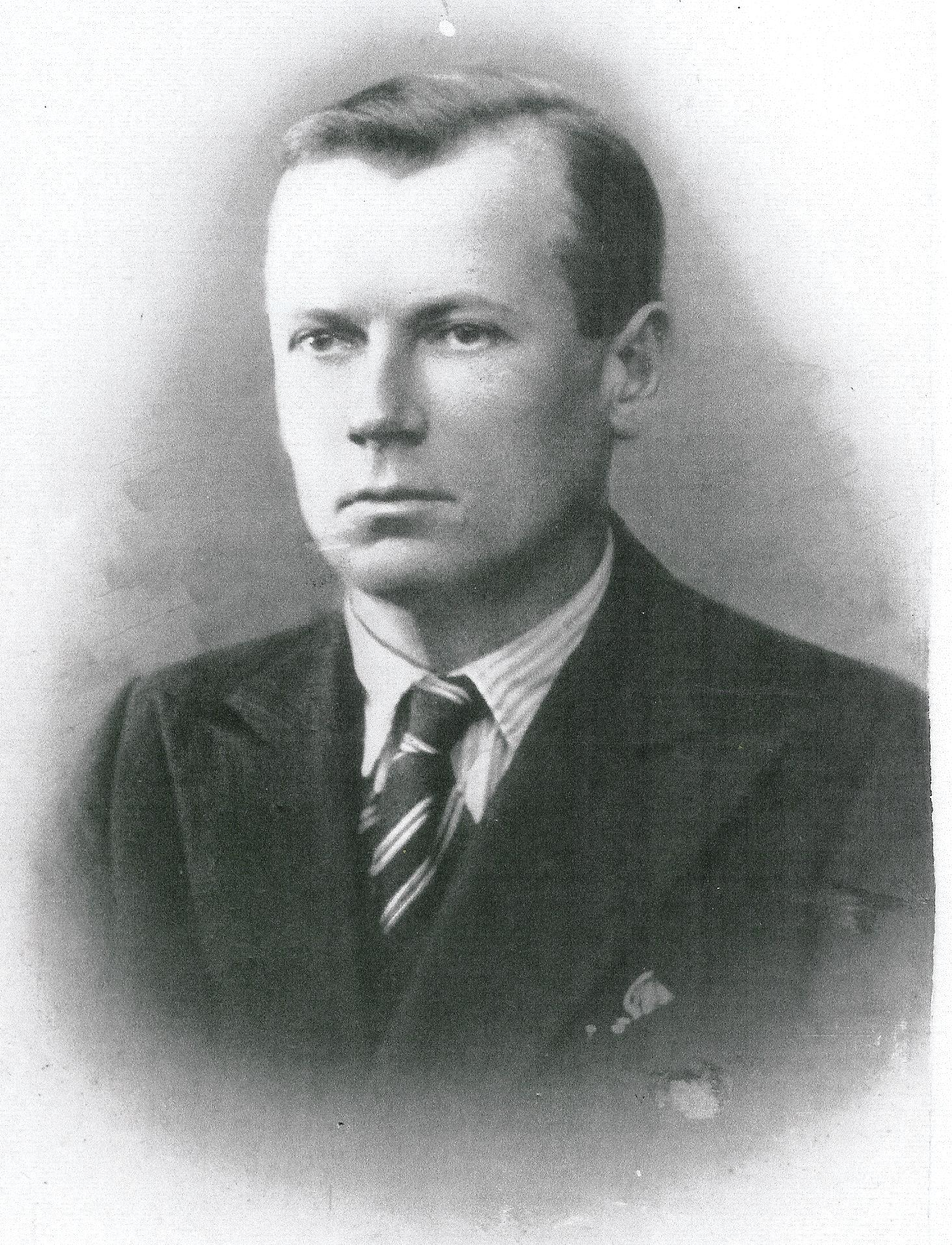
- Marcel Clech
- Born: 11 October 1905; Brittany, France
- Died: 24 March 1944 (aged 38); Mauthausen concentration camp, Austria
- Military career
- Branch: British Army
- Service years: 1940-1944
- Rank: Lieutenant
- Unit: Special Operations Executive
- Conflicts: World War II

Marcel Rémy Clech (1905 – 1944) was a French agent in the French section of the Special Operations Executive during the Second World War. He was sent to France on three missions and worked as a wireless operator in three different networks before his arrest, and was executed at Mauthausen Concentration Camp.

Clech was born in Brittany and worked as a taxi driver in Brittany before joining the Special Operations Executive (SOE) during World War II as a wireless operator. He participated in three missions: the first was aborted after coming under fire; the second involved assisting in the landing of SOE agents in France, after which he worked with the Monkepuzzle network; and the third mission saw him work as a radio operator for the Inventor network. The network was betrayed, and Clech was arrested and later executed at the Mauthausen concentration camp in 1944. He was posthumously awarded the Médaille de la Résistance, and is commemorated at The Valençay SOE Memorial in France and Brookwood Memorial in Surrey.

== Early life ==
Marcel Rémy Clech was born in Brittany on 11 October 1905. He lived in London working as a taxi driver.

== World War II ==
He joined the Special Operations Executive, section F, as a wireless operator. He was commissioned as Lieutenant in the British Army on the general list

=== First mission ===
On 1 August 1940 a motorboat attempted to land three French agents: Clech, Tilly, and Victor Bernard at Carentec in Brittany but had to abort the mission after coming under fire and returned to England.

=== Second mission ===
Clech was sent to France to became the radio operator of the 'Autogiro' network of Pierre de Vomécourt (codename "Lucas").

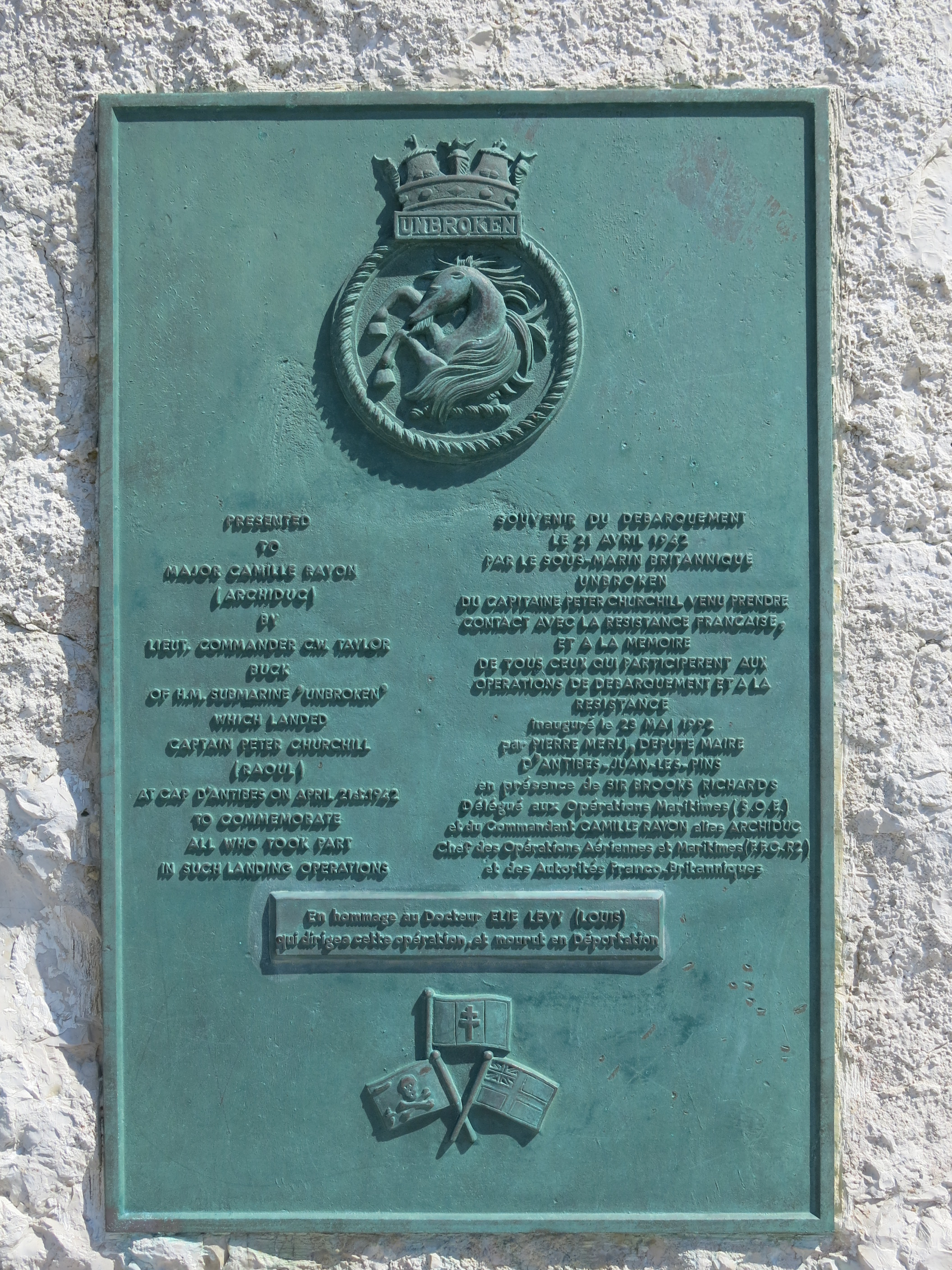
Monument commemorating the landing of Capt. Peter Churchill from HMS Unbroken at Cap d'Antibes on 21 April 1942

In Operation Delay II Peter Churchill’s mission was to land four SOE agents on the French Riviera by submarine. On 26 February 1942 Churchill flew from Bristol to Gibraltar with two radio operators, Isidore Newman ("Julien") for the Urchin network and Edward Zeff ("Matthieu") for the Spruce network, where they were joined by Marcel Clech ("Bastien"), radio operator for the Autogiro network, and Victor Gerson ("René"), an SOE agent on a special mission to organise the Vic Escape Line. They travelled in the submarine HMS Unbroken to Antibes where on the night of 21 April 1942 Churchill took Newman and Zeff and their radios to the shore by canoe, and led them to their contact Dr Élie Lévy. Churchill then returned to the submarine and dropped off Clech and Gerson by canoe at Pointe d’Agay near Fréjus before returning to the UK.

Arriving in Lyon in early May, Clech learnt that Vomécourt, the organiser of the Autogiro network, had been arrested on 25 April. His mission was then modified and he was sent to Tours, where he was assigned to the Monkepuzzle network of Raymond Flower ("Gaspar"). He worked there from 3 August. On the night of 14 April he was brought back to London by Westland Lysander.

=== Third mission ===
Clech became the radio operator of Inventor network of Sidney Jones ("Élie"), with Vera Leigh ("Simone") as courier.

On the night of 14 May 1943 he was brought by Lysander piloted by Hugh Verity with Sidney Jones and Vera Leigh to set up the Inventor network. Julienne Aisner accompanied them and became courier of the Farrier circuit.

The network was betrayed by double agent Roger Bardet, and on 30 October Leigh was arrested. On 19 November Clech was arrested after his transmissions in Boulogne-Billancourt had been located by the German direction-finding service. Jones was arrested the next day. Clech was deported to Mauthausen concentration camp where he was executed on 24 March 1944. Leigh and Jones were also executed, Leigh at Natzweiler-Struthof concentration camp, Jones at Mauthausen.

== Recognition ==
=== Distinctions ===
- France: Médaille de la Résistance

=== Monuments ===
- As one of the 104 agents of section F who gave their lives for the liberation of France, Marcel Clech is honoured at The Valençay SOE Memorial, Indre, France.
- Brookwood Memorial, Surrey, panel 21, column 3.
