= Philippe de Gunzbourg =

WWII French spy

Baron Philippe Georges de Gunzbourg LdH CdG MBE (1904–1986) was a French aristocrat who became a Special Operations Executive agent during the World War II.

== Early life ==
Philippe Georges de Gunzbourg was born in Paris on 17 February 1904, the son of Baron Pierre de Gunzburg (the son of Baron Horace Günzburg), a banker, and Yvonne Deutsch de La Meurthe. His sister, Aline de Gunzbourg, married the British writer and philosopher Isaiah Berlin.

He studied in Paris and Oxford.

He finished second in the 1933 Le Mans 24 Hours motor race.

== World War II ==
In November 1942, after the German occupation of Vichy France, he made contact with Maurice Pertschuk, organiser of the PRUNUS network in Toulouse, and joined him as courier. The wireless operator was Marcus Bloom.

Philippe de Gunzbourg noted that Pertschuk had a reckless lack of security, with resistance leaders sharing tables in black-market restaurants in Toulouse and speaking in English, and on 12 April 1943 Pertschuk, Bloom, and several of their key colleagues were arrested. They were possibly betrayed by double agent Roger Bardet. Pertschuk was deported to Buchenwald, Bloom to Mauthausen, and both were executed. The PRUNUS network collapsed after their arrest, though de Gunzbourg escaped and transferred to the WHEELWRIGHT network of George Starr, where he worked until liberation.

== Post-war ==
After the war, he devoted himself to agriculture, agri-food, and prunes. He was one of the pioneers of France-Prune, and its first president.

He died on 10 July 1986, aged 82, and was buried in the cemetery of Saint-Léon.

== Recognition ==
=== Awards ===
France	Légion d'honneur (Commander)
France	Croix de Guerre
France	Médaille militaire
UK	Member of the Order of the British Empire (Military)

=== Monument ===
In Losse (Landes), a stele inaugurated on 23 May 2002 quotes Philippe de Gunzbourg as part of a tribute to seven other agents brought to France nearby during five airdrops between August 1943 and April 1944: Maurice Southgate, organiser of the STATIONER network; four agents for the WHEELWRIGHT network of George Starr: Yvonne Cormeau, radio operator, Anne-Marie Walters, courier, Claude Arnault, saboteur instructor, and Denis Parsons, radio operator; two agents for the SCHOLAR network: Gonzague de Saint-Geniès, network organiser, and Yvonne Baseden, radio operator.

=== Place name ===
Place Philippe de Gunzbourg in Bergerac is named after him.

=== Bibliography ===
Tourism and rural environment. A profitable outlet for agriculture, with H. Farcy, "The Earth" collection, Flammarion, 1969.

== External sources ==
- Anne-Marie Walters, Moondrop to Gascony. Macmillan & Co Ltd, 1946
- MRD Foot, SOE in France an account of the work of the British Special Operations Executive in France, 1940–1944, HMSO, London, 1966.
- E.G. Boxshall, Chronology of SOE operations with the French Resistance during World War II, 1960.
- Max Hastings, Das Reich: The March of the 2nd SS Panzer Division through France. Pan Military Classics, 2000.
