= Isidore Newman =

British espionage agent

SOE agent Isidore Newman

Isidore Newman MBE CdeG MdeR (26 January 1916 – 7 September 1944) was a British secret agent in the French section of the Special Operations Executive during the Second World War.

== Early life ==
He was born in Leeds on 26 January 1916, the son of Russian Jewish immigrants Joseph and Tilly Newman. He grew up in Durham where he trained as a primary school teacher, before moving to Hull in 1938, and had studied French at university though spoke it less than perfectly.

== WWII ==
He joined the Royal Corps of Signals in August 1940, before joining the Special Operations Executive's French (or F) Section in July 1941.

=== First mission ===
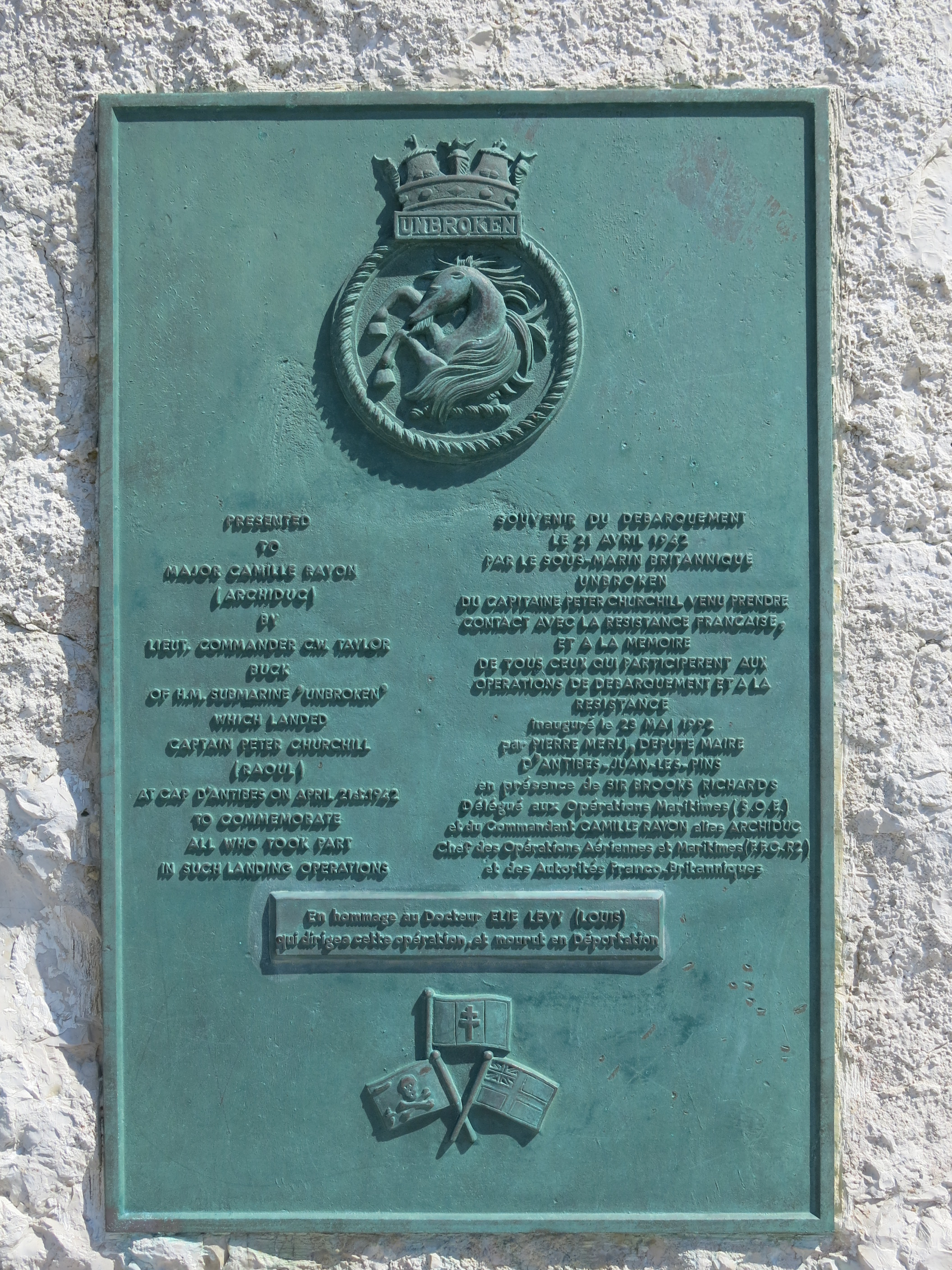
Monument commemorating the landing of Capt. Peter Churchill from HMS Unbroken at Cap d'Antibes on 21 April 1942

In Operation DELAY II Peter Churchill’s mission was to land four SOE agents on the French Riviera by submarine. On 26 February 1942 Churchill flew from Bristol to Gibraltar with two radio operators, Isidore Newman «Julien» for the URCHIN network and Edward Zeff «Matthieu» for the SPRUCE network, where they were joined by Marcel Clech «Bastien», radio operator for the AUTOGIRO network, and Victor Gerson «René», an SOE agent on a special mission to organise the VIC Escape Line. They travelled in HM Submarine P 42 “Unbroken” to Antibes where on the night of 21 April 1942 Churchill took Newman and Zeff and their radios to the shore by canoe, and led them to their contact Dr Élie Lévy. Churchill then returned to the submarine and dropped off Clech and Gerson by canoe at Pointe d’Agay near Fréjus before returning to the UK.

In May Newman joined the URCHIN network of Francis Basin "Olive" on the Côte d'Azur and established radio links with London, sending around 200 messages before Basin was arrested in Cannes on 18 August. Peter Churchill returned to Cannes on 27 August to organise and coordinate the SOE F Section SPINDLE Network which directed the delivery of supplies to support the CARTE Organisation run by André Girard and Newman joined SPINDLE as Network Manager. A quarrel arose between Newman and Girard because of the excessive length of the messages that Girard imposed on him, in contradiction with the rules of security. Considering it vital to remain on good terms with Girard, Churchill sent Newman back to London in early November.

=== Second mission ===
He was brought by Lysander on the night of 19/20 July 1943 near Azay-sur-Cher to be radio operator of Philippe Liewer's SALESMAN network in Rouen and Le Havre. His nom de guerre was "Peter" (or "Pepe"). During this mission Newman sent 54 messages. SALESMAN needed a reliable radio link with London to begin coordinating supply drops and made effective use of the arms it then received, sinking an 800-ton minesweeper in September, and wrecking a local power station the following month. Newman maintained tight security, transmitting from three separate locations and never transmitting more than twice from the same location before moving to the next, but German direction-finding teams were close to arresting him and he was forced to cease transmission for six weeks at one point. On 8 March 1944, Claude Malraux, who was temporarily in charge of SALESMAN, was arrested and within hours all his contacts were blown.

=== Arrest and death ===
Newman was arrested on 31 March 1944 and was subsequently suspected of revealing the locations of his safe houses. He was taken to the Gestapo prison in Paris, then Fresnes prison, and lastly transferred to Mauthausen concentration camp where he was executed on 7 September 1944.

== Recognition ==
=== Awards ===
- Great Britain: Member of the Order of the British Empire (Military), Mentioned in Despatches
- France: Croix de Guerre, Médaille de la Résistance

=== Monuments ===
- As one of the 104 agents of section F who lost their lives for France, Isidore Newman is honoured at The Valençay SOE Memorial, Indre, France.
- Brookwood Memorial, Surrey, panel 21, column 3.

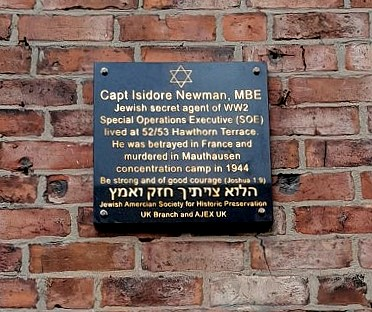
Capt. Isidore Newman, British Secret Agent, SOE, MI6 during WW2

- Historical marker of honor on the home he lived in, in Durham, erected 2023 by Jewish American Society for Historic Preservation (U.K. Branch).

Captain Isidore Newman, MBE
Jewish Secret Agent of WW2 Special Operations Executive (SOE)
Lived at 52/53 Hawthorn Terrace.
He was betrayed in France and murdered in Mauthausen concentration camp in 1944
Be Strong and of Good Courage, Joshua 1:9
Jewish American Society for Historic Preservation U.K. Branch, AJEX U.K.

== External sources ==
- The F Section Memorial, Gerry Holdsworth Special Forces Charitable Trust, 1992
- M. R. D. Foot (2006). SOE in France. An Account of the Work of the British Special Operations Executive in France, 1940–1944. Routledge. ISBN 0415408008.
- Lt. Col. EG Boxshall, Chronology of SOE operations with the resistance in France during World War II, 1960, typed document (copy from the Pearl Witherington-Cornioley Library, available at the Valençay Library). See sheet 17, DONKEYMAN CIRCUIT and sheet 22, SALESMAN CIRCUIT.
- Verity, Hugh (2013). We Landed by Moonlight. Crecy Publishing. ISBN 9780947554750.
- Sir Brooks Richards, Secret Flotillas: the Clandestine Sea Lines to France and French North Africa, HMSO, 1996.
- 'Fighting Back' by Martin Sugarman, Valentine Mitchell, 2017 and in
- Jewish Historical Studies Volume 41, 2007
