= Edward Zeff =

British SOE agent

Edward Zeff MBE Croix de Guerre (1904–1974) was a British agent of the Special Operations Executive during the Second World War.

== Early life ==
Edward Zeff was born to Jewish parents in Brighton on 22 April 1904. He was educated at York Place Elementary Schools in Brighton. In around 1922 he joined his older brother in Paris to develop the family tailoring business in Paris and, after the fall of France in 1940, returned to Britain with his French wife, Reine Sevilla.

== World War II ==
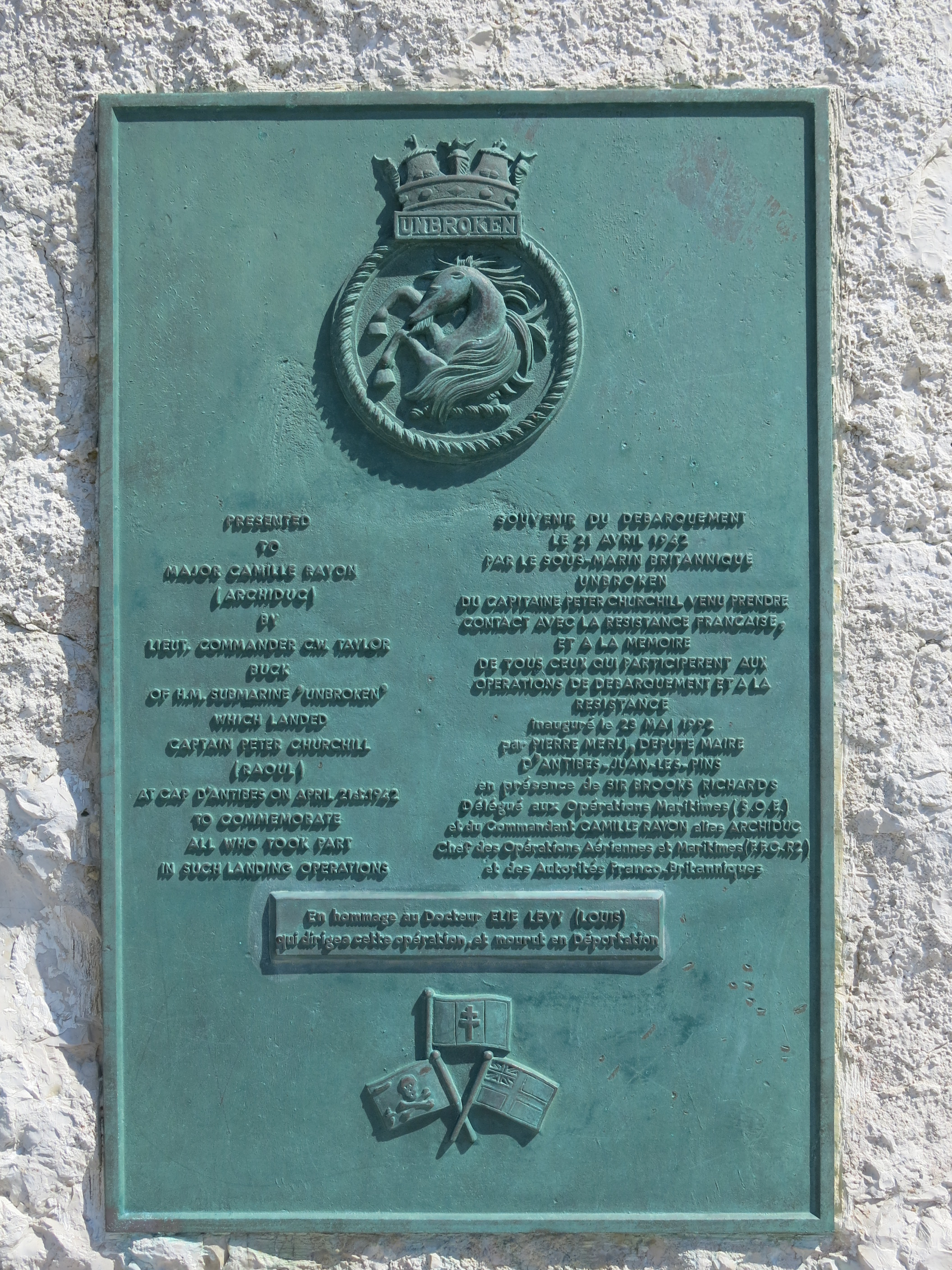
Monument commemorating the landing of Capt. Peter Churchill from HMS Unbroken at Cap d'Antibes on 21 April 1942

Edward Zeff trained as a signaller and, as a fluent French speaker, volunteered for the French Section of the Special Operations Executive.

In Operation DELAY II Peter Churchill's mission was to land four SOE agents on the French Riviera by submarine. On 26 February 1942 Churchill flew from Bristol to Gibraltar with two radio operators, Isidore Newman «Julien» for the URCHIN network and Edward Zeff «Matthieu» for the SPRUCE network, where they were joined by Marcel Clech «Bastien», radio operator for the AUTOGIRO network, and Victor Gerson «René», an SOE agent on a special mission to organise the VIC Escape Line. They travelled in HM Submarine P 42 "Unbroken" to Antibes where on the night of 21 April 1942 Churchill took Newman and Zeff and their radios to the shore by canoe, and led them to their contact Dr Élie Lévy. Churchill then returned to the submarine and dropped off Clech and Gerson by canoe at Pointe d'Agay near Fréjus before returning to the UK.

After arriving in Lyon Zeff was assigned by Virginia Hall to the SPRUCE network of Georges Duboudin «Alain» which successfully organised drops of weapons and supplies from London for the French Resistance. For his work as a radio operator he was supported by Denis Rake «Justin» and Pierre Le Chêne «Grégoire».

SOE headquarters in London became aware that the Germans were close to arresting him and in February 1943 arranged for Zeff and sabotage instructor Bob Sheppard «Patrice» to be taken across the Pyrenees into Spain, but they were arrested by the Germans having been betrayed by one of their guides.

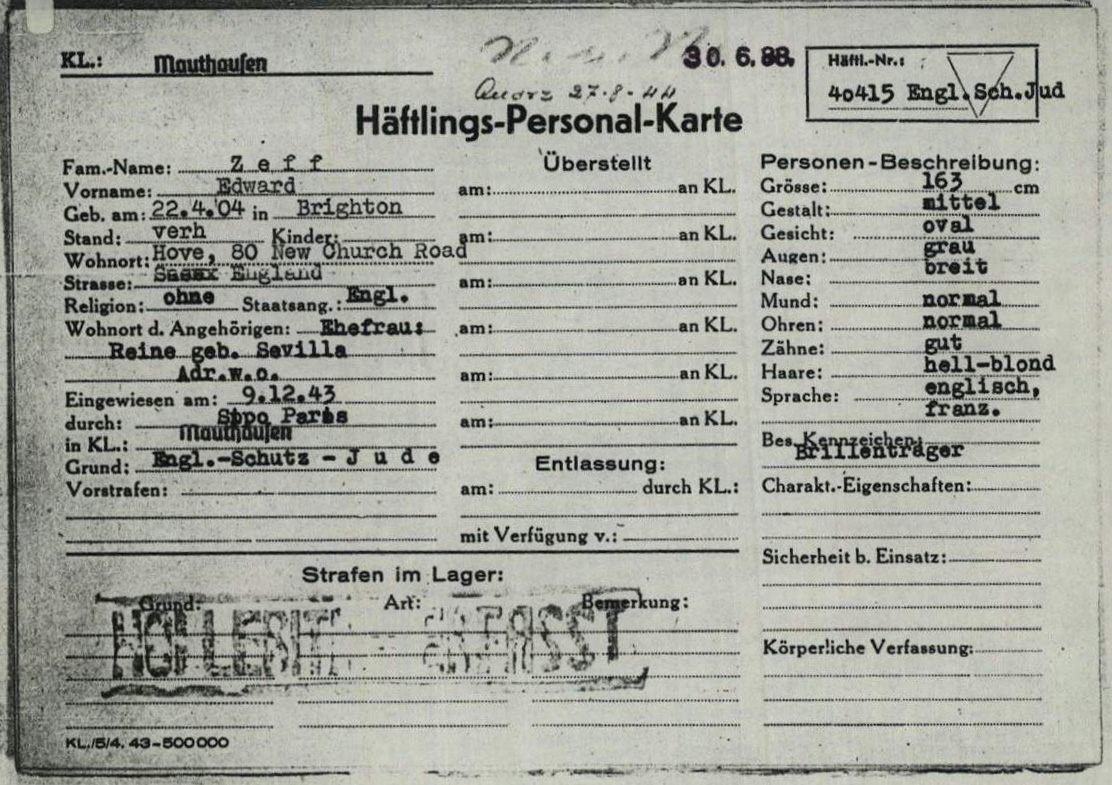
Registration card of Edward Zeff as a prisoner at Mauthausen Nazi Concentration Camp

He was sent successively to Fresnes prison, in a prison in Prague, Mauthausen concentration camp, then Melk where he was condemned to receive fifty lashes before being hanged but escaped death having befriended one of the camp Kommandants, finally, again at Mauthausen, where he was the only British Jew who was there at the time of the liberation by the Americans in 1945. He had been brutally tortured over three months but revealed no information to the Nazis. After the war he filed a claim for persecution.

== Post-war ==
In 1945 he arrived home to his wife in Brighton, but later returned to his business in Paris where he died in 1974.

== Recognition ==
=== Awards ===
- United Kingdom: MBE
- France: Croix de Guerre (with Silver Star)

=== Civil ===
- A plaque in Brighton commemorates his post-war home.

== External sources and links ==
- National Archives, HS 9/1638/4
- Nazi persecution claim: Captain Edward Zeff MBE, The National Archives, FO 950/2270
- Nazi persecution claim: Mrs Evelyn B Franks for Mr Robert M Sheppard, Mr Edward Zeff, Mr Pierre Louis Le Chene, Mr Brian Stonehouse, Mr Thomas Groome, Mr John Hopper, Mr John Carter. The National Archives, FO 950/895
- MRD Foot, SOE in France an account of the work of the British Special Operations Executive in France, 1940–1944, HMSO, London, 1966.
- André Courvoisier, The Heckler Network: from Lyon to London. Paris, France-Empire Publishing,1984, 299 p. (ISBN 978-2-704-80342-2).
- Sir Brooks Richards, Secret Flotillas. Clandestine links in France and North Africa, 1940–1944
- Bob Sheppard, Secret missions and deportation, 1939–1945: the Picardy roses., Heimdal, Bayeux, 1998 (ISBN 2-840-48111-1)
- Evelyn Le Chêne, Mauthausen, history of a death camp.
- Paul McCue, Brighton's Secret Agents: The Brighton & Hove Contribution to Britain's WW2 Special Operations Executive (SOE). Uniform Press, 2016. ISBN 1910500755
