= Peter Pertschuk =

French espionage agent

Peter Pertschuk (12 July 1923 – 9 October 1993) was a French Special Operations Executive agent during the Second World War.

== Early life ==
He was born in Paris on 12 July 1923, the son of Russian Jewish parents Joseph Pertschuk and Ethel Muriel (née Sborowfsky). The family moved to England in 1933 and became naturalised British. He was educated in French at the Lycée Français in Kensington until the family moved back to France in 1939.

== World War II ==
The Pertschuk family fled the German invasion to the unoccupied zone of France to live in Montréjeau in southwestern France. In the summer of 1940 Pertschuk and his older brother, Maurice, left for England where Maurice volunteered for the British Army and was called up by the Royal Sussex Regiment and subsequently joined the Special Operations Executive F section, while Peter joined the Royal Air Force and later also served with the SOE.

Peter served as a radar mechanic in the RAF Voluntary Reserve from December 1941-March 1944, and in April 1944 joined the Special Operations Executive F section, and became a commissioned Pilot Officer in the Special Duties Branch of the RAFVR in July 1944.

His brother, Maurice Pertschuk was an SOE agent, organiser of the PRUNUS network in Toulouse until his arrest in April 1943, however Peter Pertschuk was never sent on any SOE operations.

== Post-war ==
In 1948 he emigrated to the United States and became a businessman in New York, where he died on 9 October 1993.
