= Élie Lévy =

French Resistance member during WWII

- Born: 29 August 1895; Compiegne, France
- Died: 24 January 1945 (aged 49); Republic of Poland
- Military career
- Allegiance: France
- Conflicts: First and Second World Wars
- Awards: Croix de Guerre, with palm, 1914-1918 Croix de Guerre, 1939-1945; Chevalier de la Légion d’honneur Médaille militaire Croix du combattant volontaire

Élie Lévy LdH, MM, CdG with palm, CdG, (1895-1945) was a French medical doctor who was a member of the French Resistance during the Second World War.

== Early life ==
Élie Victor Amedee Lévy was born on 29 August 1895 at Compiegne, where his father was an engineer.

== First World War ==
In 1914 Lévy joined the Zouaves aged 18 years old. At the front he was wounded three times by shrapnel and gassed. He was awarded a Croix de Guerre, with palm.

== Inter war period ==
Lévy studied medicine and in 1922 moved to Paris specialising in paediatrics. He was also a graduate of the Institute of Forensic Medicine and Psychiatry at the University of Paris. He married in 1923 and had two daughters. In 1934 he moved with his family to Antibes.

== Second World War ==
In 1939 aged 44 Lévy was mobilized as a reserve lieutenant in Castres, where he trained the young classes. In 1940 he served in the 3rd Mechanical Light Division in the Belgian campaign, in which he was awarded a Croix de Guerre with citation.

He returned to Antibes where created a Resistance network, and until mid 1942 his home in Antibes was a meeting point for numerous Resistance agents, and SOE agents when they arrived in France.

Lévy was the main organiser of the escape of a group of British officers from Lille prison in 1941.

In August 1941 he was recruited by Jacques Vaillant de Guélis to assist the Special Operations Executive SPINDLE Network in Cannes, having been recommended by Max Hymans. Lévy used the pseudonyms "Louis", "Philippe" and "Oscar".

In early 1942 he met Jean Moulin "Rex", envoy of General de Gaulle, who was parachuted in the evening of 1 January, and Peter Churchill, who arrived at his house on 10 January at the start of his first mission in France, and again on 21 April on his second mission when he brought two radio operators Isidore Newman «Julien» for the URCHIN network and Edward Zeff «Matthieu» for the SPRUCE network, From April to July 1942 he hosted Maurice Pertschuk, a young officer of the SOE, future head of the Eugène-Prunus network in Toulouse and its region.

He helped numerous Resistance agents, including Emmanuel d'Astier de la Vigerie, Yvon Morandat, Henri Frenay, and Philippe Roques. He assisted many SOE agents, to whom he provided false documents when they arrived in France, or lodging them before their departure by submarine; some were radio operators; others brought in funds for the Resistance. For three days he sheltered three allied pilots, an American, a Pole, and an Englishman, who had been shot down. None spoke French and thanks to the Resistance they escaped and were able to reach Spain.

In summer 1942 Lévy and his wife left Antibes and went into hiding near Lake Laffrey (Isère), where he remained in the Resistance in Lyon.

After returning to Antibes, Lévy was arrested by Italian police on the 4 May 1943 and detained in secret in Nice. During an interrogation he found himself with Peter Churchill and others, but pretended not to know them. He was transferred to Imperia, where he had to break pebbles on the roads, then moved to Chiavari. Amedeo Rocchegiani, who sent money and helped Jewish and political prisoners, organised the escape of Lévy so that he could have found refuge in the hospital in Ancona, but he refused, having given his word as an officer not to escape.

In September 1943 the Italians transferred all political prisoners to the Germans. As a Jew, he was deported to Auschwitz-Birkenau II, where he endured fifteen months of hell.

As Soviet troops were advancing in January 1945, the camp was evacuated and the inmates were sent on a "death march" which lasted 52 days, during which about a quarter died. Lévy died on 24 January, having fallen exhausted on the road between Rybnik and Racibórz, and was probably shot.

== Recognition ==
=== Awards ===
World War I

France	Croix de Guerre with palm

World War II

France	Légion d'honneur (Chevalier)
France	Croix de Guerre
France	Médaille militaire

=== Monument ===
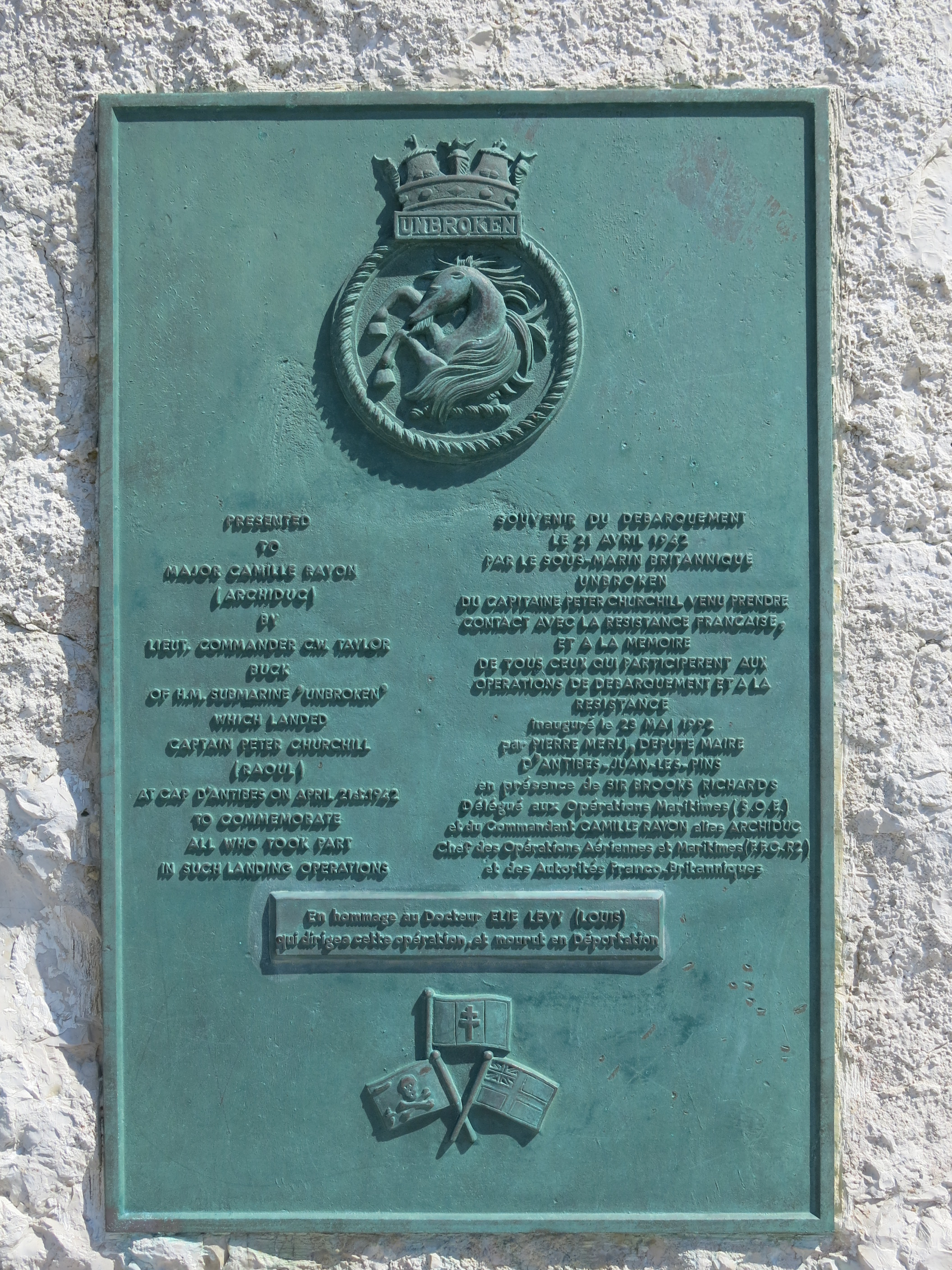
Monument commemorating the landing of Capt. Peter Churchill from HMS Unbroken at Cap d'Antibes on 21 April 1942

- A plaque at Cap d'Antibes commemorating the landing of Capt. Peter Churchill from submarine HMS Unbroken on 21 April 1942 pays tribute to Levy.
