= Henry Le Chêne =

French SOE agent

Henry Paul Le Chêne (23 August 1891 – ?) was a British-born French Special Operations Executive agent during the Second World War.

== Early life ==
Le Chêne was born in St Pancras, London in 1891, the son of Achille Henry Le Chêne, a London-born civil servant in HM Customs service, and Louise Mélanie Ragot, born in Réunion. In 1922, his parents retired and moved to France. He worked as a hotel proprietor and an administrator in Kenya.

== World War II ==
During the German invasion in 1940, Henry, his wife Marie-Thérèse, and his younger brother, Pierre, left France for England on the last boat leaving from Bayonne.

He joined the Special Operations Executive along with Marie-Thérèse, while Pierre joined subsequently.

On 22 April 1942, he landed in France to become organiser of the SPRUCE network in the Lyons area. His wife Marie-Thérèse later joined him as courier. After his first visit to Virginia Hall he decided that Lyons was unsafe and changed his area to Clermont-Ferrand and Périgueux. In December 1942 following the arrest of his some of his network and also his brother Pierre, he decided to return to the UK via the Pyrenees. Too tired to join him, his wife hid in friends' homes and was evacuated by the SOE from Angers on 19 August 1943. Back in England, she rejoined her husband.

== Post-war ==
He and his wife returned to France in 1946 and opened a hotel in Sainte-Menehould in collaboration with his brother, Pierre.
