= Sidney Charles Jones =

British Special Operations Executive agent

Sidney Jones MBE CdeG MR (25 November 1902 – 6 September 1944) was a British Special Operations Executive agent during the Second World War. He was captured and executed by the Germans.

== Early life ==
Sidney Charles Jones was born in France on 25 November 1902, the son of Charles and Emily Louise Jones. Before the war he worked as Elizabeth Arden’s representative in France.

== Wartime activities ==
He was nearly 40 when he arrived in the French Riviera by felucca in late September 1942 with the mission of establishing the INVENTOR network as a sabotage circuit in Marseille. Before the German occupation of Vichy France in November 1942 he had set up several sabotage teams which had burnt fifty goods wagons destined for Germany, and had damaged port installations. After five months in the field, Jones then returned to England.

On the night of 14 May 1943 he was brought by Lysander piloted by Hugh Verity, with Marcel Clech as wireless operator, and Vera Leigh as courier, to re-form the INVENTOR network, working alongside DONKEYMAN, with Jones as liaison officer and arms instructor.

The INVENTOR network was betrayed by double agent Roger Bardet, and on 30 October 1943 Leigh was arrested in Paris. On 19 November Clech was arrested in Boulogne-Billancourt after his transmissions were located by the German direction-finding service, and Jones was arrested the next day. Leigh was executed at Natzweiler-Struthof concentration camp, and Clech was executed at Mauthausen concentration camp on 24 March 1944. Jones was executed at Mauthausen on 6 September 1944, aged 42.

== Recognition ==
=== Awards ===
- United Kingdom: MBE
- France: Croix de Guerre
- France: Resistance Medal

=== Monuments ===
- He is honoured at The Valençay SOE Memorial, Indre, as one of the 104 agents of section F who lost their lives for France's liberation.
- Brookwood Memorial, Surrey, Panel 4, Column 3.
