= Pierre Le Chêne =

French SOE agent

Pierre Louis Le Chêne LdH CdG MBE (14 June 1900 – 1979) was a British-born French Special Operations Executive agent during the Second World War.

== Early life ==
Le Chêne was born in Brixton in 1900, the son of Achille Henry Le Chêne, a London-born civil servant in HM Customs service, and Louise Mélanie Ragot, born in Réunion. In 1922, his parents retired and moved to France. Le Chêne worked for a while at the American Express Travel Agency in Nice and Monte Carlo, where he married a Frenchwoman.

During the German invasion in 1940 Pierre, his older brother Henri, and his sister-in-law Marie-Thérèse, left France for England on the last boat leaving from Bayonne. He served in the London Fire Brigade. He then volunteered to join the Special Operations Executive in the footsteps of his brother Henri and sister-in-law Marie-Thérèse.

On the night of 30 April/1 May 1942 he was parachuted near Loches to assist Edward Zeff in the Lyons area, as a radio operator of the SPRUCE network, successively headed by Georges Duboudin and Robert Boiteux. He worked there for six months, often changing his place of transmission.

In October and November 1942 several radio operators were arrested, and Le Chêne remained the only radio operator in the sector, however on 9 November 1942 he was located by a German radio-direction van, having transmitted well beyond the safe period, and was arrested by French police accompanied by Gestapo agents. He was taken to the police station in Lyons for two weeks, then handed over to the Sicherheitsdienst headquarters in Avenue Foch in Paris, then moved to Fresnes prison. He was the first British officer to be interrogated by the notorious SS Captain Klaus Barbie, head of the Gestapo in Lyons, but did not betray anyone.

In 1943/1944 he remained in solitary confinement to 10 months, then deported to Mauthausen concentration camp, where he was subjected to the notorious “stairs of death” in which prisoners were forced to climb 186 steps while carrying a 50 kg block of granite, leading to many deaths. After 10 months he was transferred to Gusen I where he endured even worse physical and mental torment: sorting internees for the gas chamber, mass executions, and accumulation of corpses.

When he was liberated by the Americans on 6 May 1945 he weighed only 38 kg and was ill with typhoid. He was brought back to England and spent 10 months in convalescence.

== Post-war ==
He returned to France in 1946 and opened a hotel in Sainte-Menehould in collaboration with his brother Henri and sister-in-law Marie-Thérèse, and later another hotel in the French Jura.

In 1964, he filed for compensation under the Anglo-German Compensation Agreement of 9 June 1964.

He died in 1979, and his widow, Evelyn, subsequently added his French Resistance medals to her long-term loan of his other medals and items to the Military Intelligence Museum in Chicksands, Bedfordshire.

=== Awards ===
| France | Légion d'honneur (Chevalier) |
| France | Croix de Guerre |
| UK | Member of the Order of the British Empire (Military) |
