= Tendu, Indre =

Tendu
- Commune
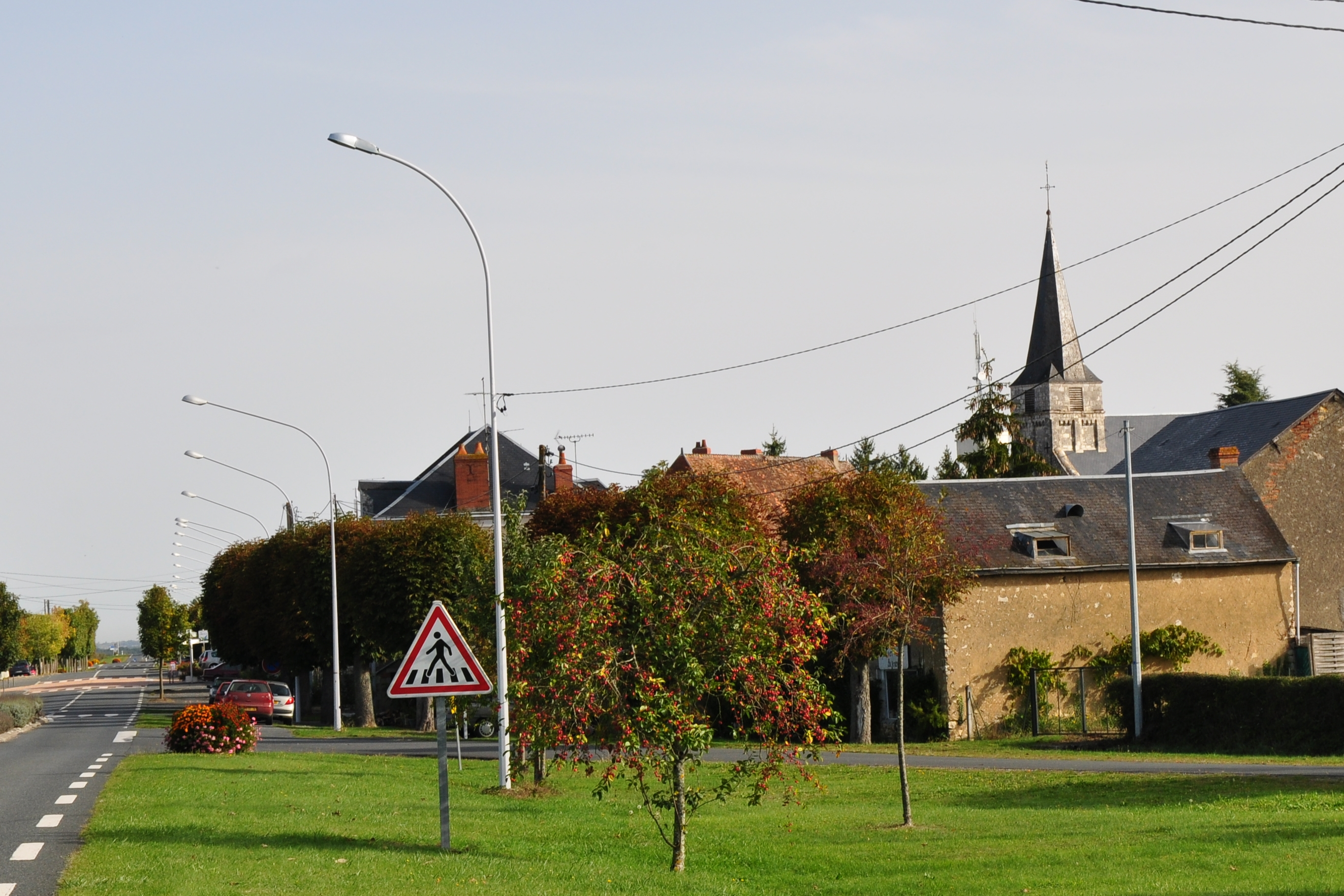
- A general view of Tendu
- Location of Tendu
- Location within France Location within Centre-Val de Loire
- Coordinates: 46°38′42″N 1°33′32″E
- Country: France
- Region: Centre-Val de Loire
- Department: Indre
- Arrondissement: Châteauroux
- Canton: Argenton-sur-Creuse

Government
  - Mayor (2020–2026): David Rodriguez
- Area^{1}: 42.17 km^{2} (16.28 sq mi)
- Elevation: 171 m (561 ft)
- Highest elevation: 174 m (571 ft)
- Lowest elevation: 107 m (351 ft)
- Population (2023): 650
  - Density: 15/km^{2} (40/sq mi)
- Time zone: UTC+01:00 (CET)
  - Summer (DST): UTC+02:00 (CEST)
- INSEE/Postal code: 36219 /36200
- ^{1} French Land Register data, which excludes lakes, ponds, glaciers > 1 km^{2} (0.386 sq mi or 247 acres) and river estuaries.

Tendu (French pronunciation: [tɑ̃dy]) is a commune in the Indre department in central France.

== Geography ==
The commune is traversed by the river Bouzanne.

== Population ==
Historical population
| Year | Pop. | ±% p.a. |
|---|---|---|
| 1968 | 483 | — |
| 1975 | 417 | −2.08% |
| 1982 | 465 | +1.57% |
| 1990 | 446 | −0.52% |
| 1999 | 451 | +0.12% |
| 2007 | 550 | +2.51% |
| 2012 | 631 | +2.79% |
| 2017 | 648 | +0.53% |
| 2023 | 650 | +0.05% |
Source: INSEE

== See also ==
- Communes of the Indre department
