= Marie-Thérèse Le Chêne =

French Special Operations Executive agent

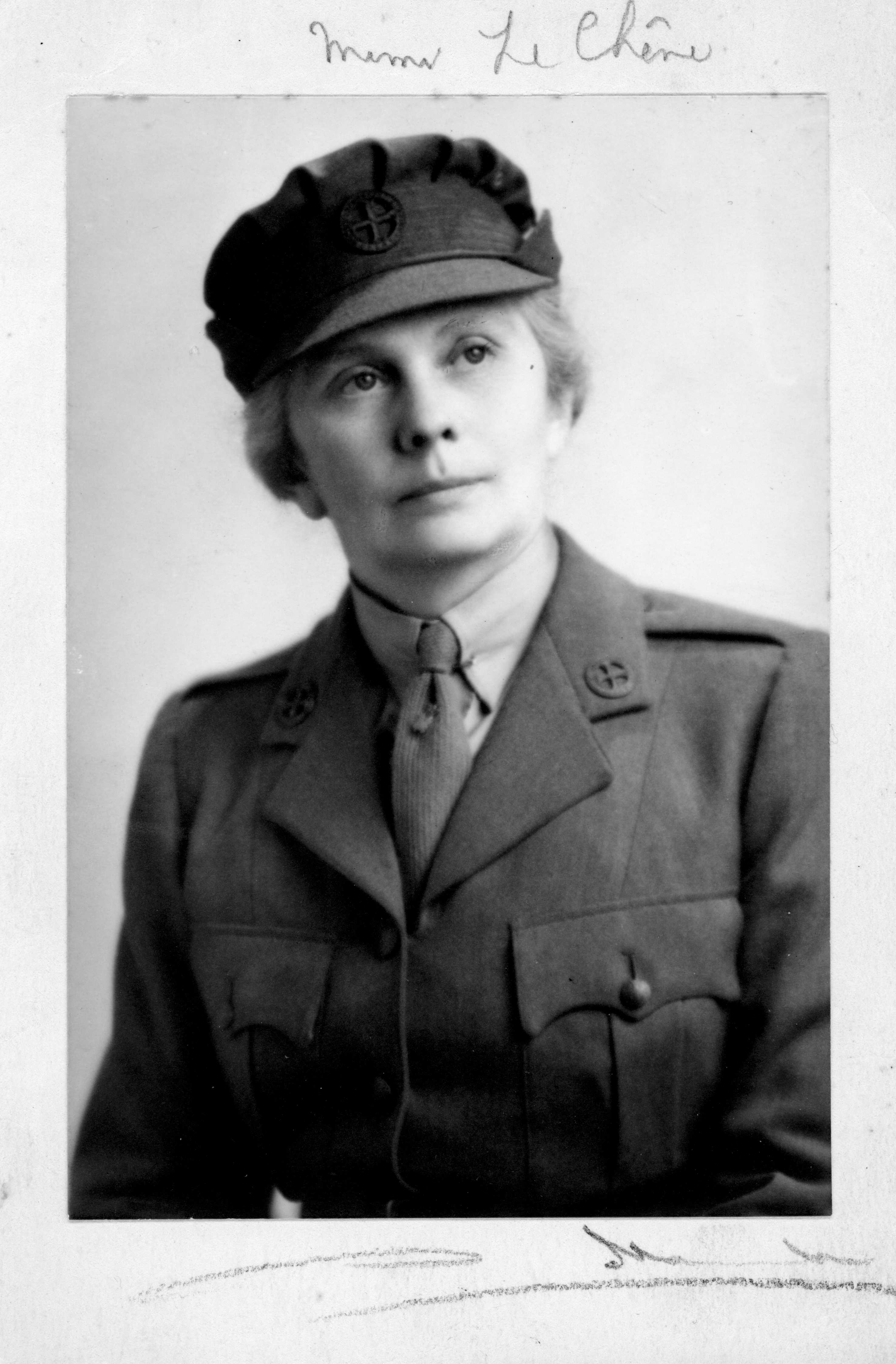
M Le Chene in 1942

Marie-Thérèse Le Chêne MBE CdG (20 April 1890 – date of death unknown) was a French civilian who was an agent of the United Kingdom's clandestine organization, the Special Operations Executive (SOE), in France during the Second World War. She was the oldest female SOE agent sent to France, serving there from 31 October 1942 until 19 August 1943. She worked as a courier with the code name of Adele. Her husband and brother-in-law were also SOE agents and she worked closely with them.

== Early life ==
Le Chêne was born in 1890 in Sedan, Ardennes, France. She was the youngest of three children. In 1917, she married a cousin, Henry Le Chêne, in London. Early in World War II, she fled France for London with her husband and brother-in-law, Pierre. In London, she worked as a cook and manager in a hotel. Her husband, born in London of French descent, had managed a hotel in Nairobi, Kenya.

== World War II ==
At the outbreak of the war, she refused to join the Charles de Gaulle's resistance organization and joined the Special Operations Executive on 16 May 1942 despite being aged 52. Her husband and brother-in-law were already in SOE and had departed England for France a few weeks earlier. Le Chêne was one of the first female agents, along with Andrée Borrel, Blanche Charlet, and Yvonne Rudellat, to be trained by SOE in Britain.

On the night of 3/4 November 1942 she was landed by boat at Port Miou, near Cassis in southern France, with SOE agents George Starr, organiser of WHEELWRIGHT; Mary Herbert, courier for SCIENTIST; and Odette Sansom courier for SPINDLE. She joined her husband, Henri, organiser (leader) of the SPRUCE network in Lyon. Le Chêne began as the courier for SPRUCE, but her role changed to the distribution of political pamphlets and anti-German leaflets as far as Marseille.

During a visit to Clermont-Ferrand she discovered that the workers at the Michelin factory were sabotaging production and delivering inferior tyres to the Germans.

In January 1943 Henri Le Chêne decided that the distribution of leaflets had lost its utility because many people were listening to the BBC for news. He escaped the country on foot over the Pyrenees, but was jailed in Spain. Too tired to join him in the rigorous crossing of the Pyrenees, Marie-Thérèse Le Chêne hid in friends' homes and was evacuated by the SOE from near Angers on 19 August 1943 via a clandestine flight that landed in a farm field. Among a group of evacuating SOE agents described as "cutthroats" she was described as "a middle-aged lady with grey hair." Back in England, she rejoined her husband who had escaped from a Spanish jail.

== External sources ==
- MRD Foot, SOE in France an account of the work of the British Special Operations Executive in France, 1940–1944, HMSO, London, 1966.
- Bernard O'Connor, Blackmail Sabotage: Attacks on French industries during World War Two, lulu.com, 2016 (ISBN 978-1291787306)
- Peter Jacobs, Setting France Ablaze: The SOE in France During WWII, Pen and Sword, 2015 (ISBN 978-1783463367)
- Beryl E. Escott, SOE Heroines, Versailles, Omblage, 2018 (ISBN 979-10-96997-05-3)
