= Maurice Pertschuk =

French espionage agent (1921–1945)

Maurice Pertschuk MBE
- Born: 31 July 1921; Paris, France
- Died: 29 March 1945 (aged 23); Buchenwald concentration camp, Nazi Germany
- Military career
- Allegiance: United Kingdom; France
- Branch: British Army; Special Operations Executive
- Service years: 1940–1945
- Rank: Lieutenant
- Units: Royal Sussex Regiment; SOE (F Section)
- Commands: PRUNUS network
- Conflicts: World War II
- Awards: Légion d’honneur (Chevalier); Croix de guerre 1939–1945

Maurice Pertschuk MBE, LdH, CdeG (31 July 1921 – 29 March 1945) was a French Special Operations Executive agent during the Second World War.

== Early life ==
The son of Jacob Joseph Pertschuk and Ethel Muriel (née Sborowfsky), Russian-born Jews who had become British citizens after escaping pogroms, he was born in Paris on 31 July 1921. In Paris, where his father ran a fur business, Pertschuk attended the Lycée Rollin, but as the French economy worsened, in December 1933, the family moved back to England. Pertschuk finished his education in French, attending the Lycée Français in Kensington. The family moved back to France in 1939, where Pertschuk got a teaching certificate from the University of Lille.

== World War II ==
That September, after England and France declared war with Germany, Pertschuk returned to London to volunteer for the British Army. By 1940 he was called up by the Royal Sussex Regiment. As a bilingual bi-cultural dual French-British national, he was recruited by the Special Operations Executive, and joined the French Section.

His younger brother Peter, who joined him in London, signed up for the Royal Air Force, and was later also trained by SOE.

In mid-April 1942 Pertschuk left for Gibraltar by submarine, and from there by the felucca "Seawolf," landing at Antibes, France, on the night of 21/22 April 1942. Once on the ground, he connected with members of the CARTE organization, who helped him get established in Toulouse, at first as a Political Warfare Executive agent, gathering intelligence, providing instruction, distributing anti-German propaganda, leaflets and tracts. Later switching to SOE, he organized his PRUNUS network for sabotage and stocking arms, with the help of Dr. Marcel Petit, Robert Vuillemot, Lucien Fayman and Philippe de Gunzbourg. PRUNUS eventually developed cells in the Landes, Gers, Hautes Pyrenées, Haute Garonne, Lot and Lot-et-Garonne. Wireless operator Marcus Bloom later joined the group.

The WHEELWRIGHT network of George Starr had no wireless operator to contact London and relied on help from the neighbouring PRUNUS circuit.

In April 1943, Pertschuk was given a mission to blow up the Toulouse gunpowder factory at Empalot. SOE arranged for him meet a foreman working there, Robert Moog, who turned out to be a double agent working for the Abwehr. On 12 April the SD arrested Pertschuk, Bloom, and 14 of their key colleagues, and the network collapsed, though de Gunzbourg escaped and transferred to the WHEELWRIGHT network.

Robert Moog then went on to arrest many key members of the Gilbert circuit, and worked closely with Klaus Barbie in Lyon in planning the arrest of the iconic leader of the National Council of the Resistance, Jean Moulin.

Pertschuk was deported to Buchenwald, where he wrote a book of lyrical poetry he called "Leaves of Buchenwald."

== Death ==
He was executed on 29 March 1945, at age 23, thirteen days before the liberation of the camp. His poems were rescued by comrades, who published them in 1946 and again in 2003.

== Recognition ==
=== Awards ===
- United Kingdom: MBE
- France: Chevalier de la Légion d’honneur, Croix de guerre 1939-1945.

=== Monuments ===
- He is honoured at The Valençay SOE Memorial, Indre, as one of the 104 agents of section F who lost their lives for France’s liberation.
- Brookwood Memorial, Surrey, panel 22 column 1.
- A plaque at Buchenwald camp honours the memory of allied officers in Block 17 who were murdered between September 1944 and March 1945, including twenty SOE agents, including "Pertschuk, Lt. M.".
