= Branford House =

Historic house in Connecticut, United States

- U.S. National Register of Historic Places
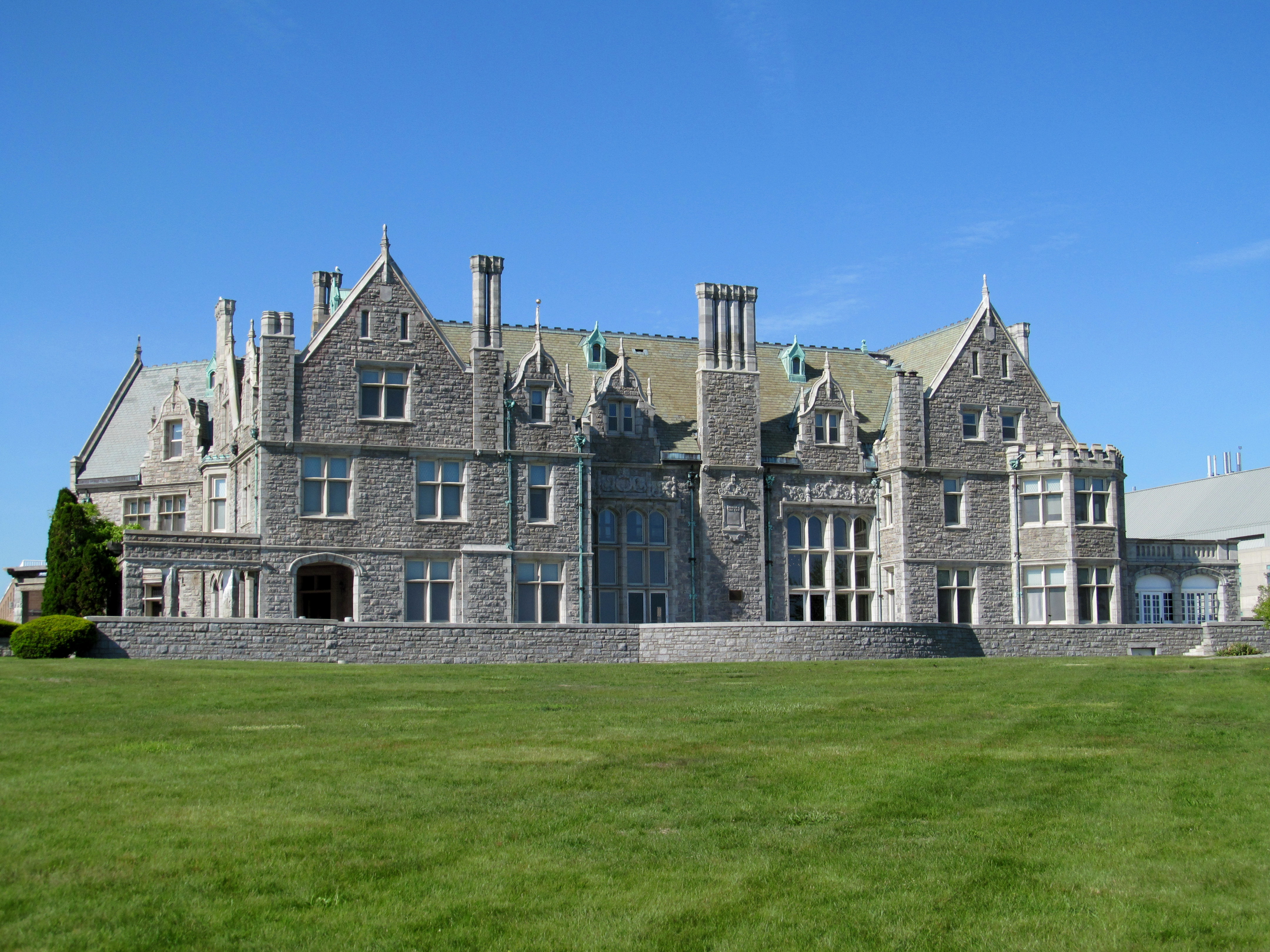
- Seaward side of Branford House in 2014

- Location within Connecticut Location within the United States
- Location: Shennecosset and Eastern Point Roads, Groton, Connecticut
- Coordinates: 41°19′1″N 72°3′52″W
- Area: 22 acres (8.9 ha)
- Built: 1902
- Built by: Gibson, Robert Williams
- Architect: Plant, Nellie Capron
- Architectural style: Jacobean
- NRHP reference No.: 84001158
- Added to NRHP: January 23, 1984

The Branford House is located in Groton, Connecticut, on the campus of UConn Avery Point, which rents it out for events. Branford House was built in 1902 for Morton Freeman Plant, a local financier and philanthropist, as his summer home; he named it after his hometown of Branford, Connecticut. The house was added to the National Register of Historic Places on January 23, 1984.

== History ==
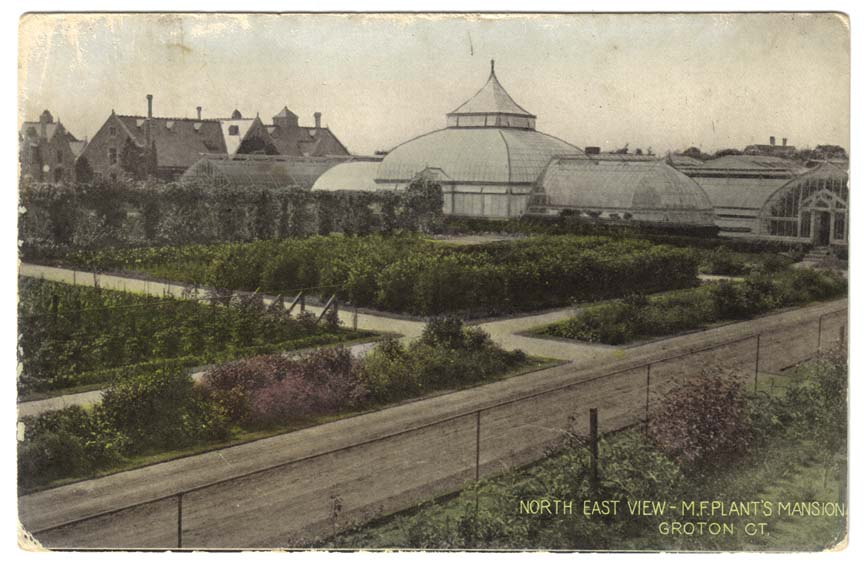
Postcard (circa 1907–1915) of Branford House and the greenhouses

Branford Manor cost $3 million in 1902, an incredible sum of money at the time. Plant shunned the high society of Newport and chose instead the wide views of Long Island Sound available at Avery Point.

Branford House was designed by Plant's second wife Nellie Capron Plant who had a Sorbonne education in architecture, and built by Robert W. Gibson. The outside was built to the Tudor style to match the estate, but the interior was a patchwork of various styles, including Gothic, Baroque, Renaissance, Classical, and Flemish. The house included a two-story fireplace surrounded by a clothes-drying conveyor belt, an elevator, and other architectural curiosities such as doors leading into exterior walls.

Plant fancied himself a gentleman farmer and built vast agricultural facilities on the grounds. These included huge greenhouses (including one to store his tropical plants during the winter), a 22,250-square-foot (2,067 m^{2}) cow barn, poultry enclosures, and fruit and vegetable fields. The estate totaled more than 70 acres (0.28 km^{2}), including carpentry and plumbing shops, a boarding house, and other buildings. Plant also bought the Quinnipiac Fertilizer Company on nearby Pine Island because he was bothered by its smell, replacing it with an orchard where his grandchildren played.

Plant died in 1918, and the estate passed through his son and daughter-in-law before being sold for $55,000 at auction in 1939. The state of Connecticut soon acquired the property and passed it to the United States Coast Guard via a quitclaim deed funded by the federal government. As a duty to that deed, the Coast Guard built Avery Point Light in 1942, though it was not lit until 1944. The lavish grounds were bulldozed into the water to make room for barracks for a training center, and the house became offices and executive quarters. The west wing was used as the base chapel until it was destroyed by fire in 1963.

In 1967, the property was transferred back to the state for use as a satellite campus of the University of Connecticut (UConn), though the buildings were largely in poor condition. By the 1980s, the house needed millions of dollars of renovations which UConn could not afford. There was discussion of a private developer turning it into a conference center or of the town taking over the property. The building was added to the National Register of Historic Places on January 23, 1984.

Ultimately, UConn carried out renovations to the house which were completed in 2001. The house is not in regular academic use; UConn rents it out for event uses. The second floor of the Branford House is home to the Alexey von Schlippe Gallery of Art.

== See also ==
- National Register of Historic Places listings in New London County, Connecticut
