= University of Connecticut =

Public university in Storrs, Connecticut, US

- Former names: Storrs Agricultural School (1881–1893); Storrs Agricultural College (1893–1899); Connecticut Agricultural College (1899–1933); Connecticut State College (1933–1939)
- Motto: Robur (Latin)
- Motto in English: "Strength" lit. "Oak"
- Type: Public land-grant research university
- Established: April 21, 1881; 145 years ago
- Accreditation: NECHE
- Academic affiliations: CUMU; U21; sea-grant; space-grant
- Endowment: $668.6 million (2025)
- President: Radenka Maric
- Provost: Pamir Alpay
- Academic staff: University system: 5,422; Health center: 5,589
- Students: 33,554 (2024)
- Undergraduates: 25,304 (2024)
- Postgraduates: 8,250 (2024)
- Location: Storrs, Connecticut, United States; 41°48′26″N 72°15′09″W
- Campus: 4,400 acres (1,800 ha); Fringe town
- Other campuses: Groton (Avery Point); Farmington; Hartford; Stamford; Waterbury
- Newspaper: The Daily Campus
- Colors: National flag blue and white
- Nickname: Huskies
- Sporting affiliations: NCAA Division I FBS - Big East; Independent (football); Hockey East; NEISA
- Mascot: Jonathan the Husky
- Website: uconn.edu

The University of Connecticut (UConn) is a public land-grant research university system with its main campus in Storrs, Connecticut, United States. It was founded in 1881 as the Storrs Agricultural School, named after two benefactors. In 1893, the school became a public land-grant college, then took its current name in 1939. Over the following decade, social work, nursing, and graduate programs were established. During the 1960s, UConn Health was established for new medical and dental schools. UConn is accredited by the New England Commission of Higher Education.

With more than 32,000 students, the University of Connecticut is the largest university in Connecticut by enrollment. The university is classified among "R1: Doctoral Universities – Very high research activity". UConn is one of the founding institutions of the Hartford-Springfield regional economic and cultural partnership alliance known as New England's Knowledge Corridor. UConn was the second U.S. university invited into Universitas 21, an international network of research-intensive universities.

The school's athletic teams compete in the Big East Conference as the Huskies. UConn has gained notable recognition for its women's and men's basketball programs and are often considered "blue bloods" in the sport. The Connecticut Huskies are the top women's basketball program in the nation, having won a record 12 NCAA Division I National Championships (most in both men's and women's Division I college basketball) and a women's record four in a row (2013–2016), in addition to over 40 conference regular season and tournament championships. Across all sports, the Huskies have collectively won 26 NCAA championships.

== History ==
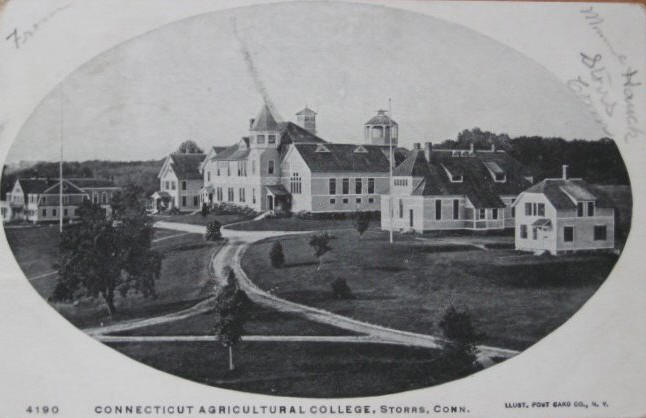
University of Connecticut, c. 1903

UConn was founded in 1881 as the Storrs Agricultural School. It was named after Charles and Augustus Storrs, brothers who donated the land for the school as well as initial funding. The Storrs Agricultural Experiment Station was founded in 1887. Women began attending classes in 1891 and were officially admitted in 1893, the same year that it became Connecticut's land-grant college and was renamed Storrs Agricultural College. In 1899, the name changed again to Connecticut Agricultural College, and, in 1933, to Connecticut State College. In its current form, the College of Agriculture is the oldest of the university's colleges and professional schools.

On May 26, 1939, Governor Raymond E. Baldwin signed the bill that allowed Connecticut State College to have its name changed to the University of Connecticut. The following year, trustees organized and developed a plan to divide the university into separate schools and colleges in Business, Education, Home Economics, Colleges of Arts and Sciences, and College of Agriculture. This was also the year the School of Social Work and School of Nursing were established. Master's degrees had been awarded since 1920, but the Graduate School was established after the reorganization of the schools in 1940, as well as the Doctoral Program for graduates which was authorized in 1943. PhDs have been awarded since 1949. The schools of law and pharmacy were also absorbed into the university.

In 1958, the School of Education established the first high school in the town of Mansfield, E. O. Smith High School, as a laboratory school for teacher training and education research. The high school, which lies adjacent to campus, was operated by the University of Connecticut until 1987, when it became the regional public high school. E.O. Smith has maintained an Agricultural Science education program since its time as a part of UConn, and junior and senior high school students may take classes for credit on UConn's campus.

During the 1970s, UConn Health was established in Farmington as a home for the new School of Medicine and School of Dental Medicine. John Dempsey Hospital opened in Farmington in 1975 and has been operated by UConn ever since.

In 1995, a state-funded program called UConn 2000 was passed by the Connecticut General Assembly and signed into law by then-Governor John G. Rowland. This 10-year program set aside $1 billion to upgrade campus facilities, add faculty, and otherwise improve the university. An additional $1.3 billion was pledged by the State of Connecticut in 2002 as part of a new ten-year improvement plan known as 21st Century UConn.

In 2001, the Institute of Comparative Human Rights (ICHR) was established at UConn, as a university‑wide institute, after the university had submitted a proposal to UNESCO to establish a UNESCO Chair in Comparative Human Rights at the university. Amii Omara-Otunnu, a tenured professor in the history department originally from Uganda, who had forged the links with South Africa, was appointed UNESCO Chair in Comparative Human Rights, which was the first UNESCO Chair in Human Rights in North America. Its focus was on engagement with South Africa, based on UConn's partnerships with a number of South African institutions, including the ANC and the University of Fort Hare. Its activities included an annual Comparative Human Rights Conference and the Comparative Human Rights Lecture Series. In March 2015 it collaborated with the Thomas J. Dodd Research Center to support the inaugural lecture series in honour of former senator and human rights champion Joseph I. Lieberman. The event was coordinated by UConn's Office of Global Affairs. The UNESCO Chair position was terminated by UNESCO on December 20, 2016, apparently because of the university not having filed paperwork to renew the position.

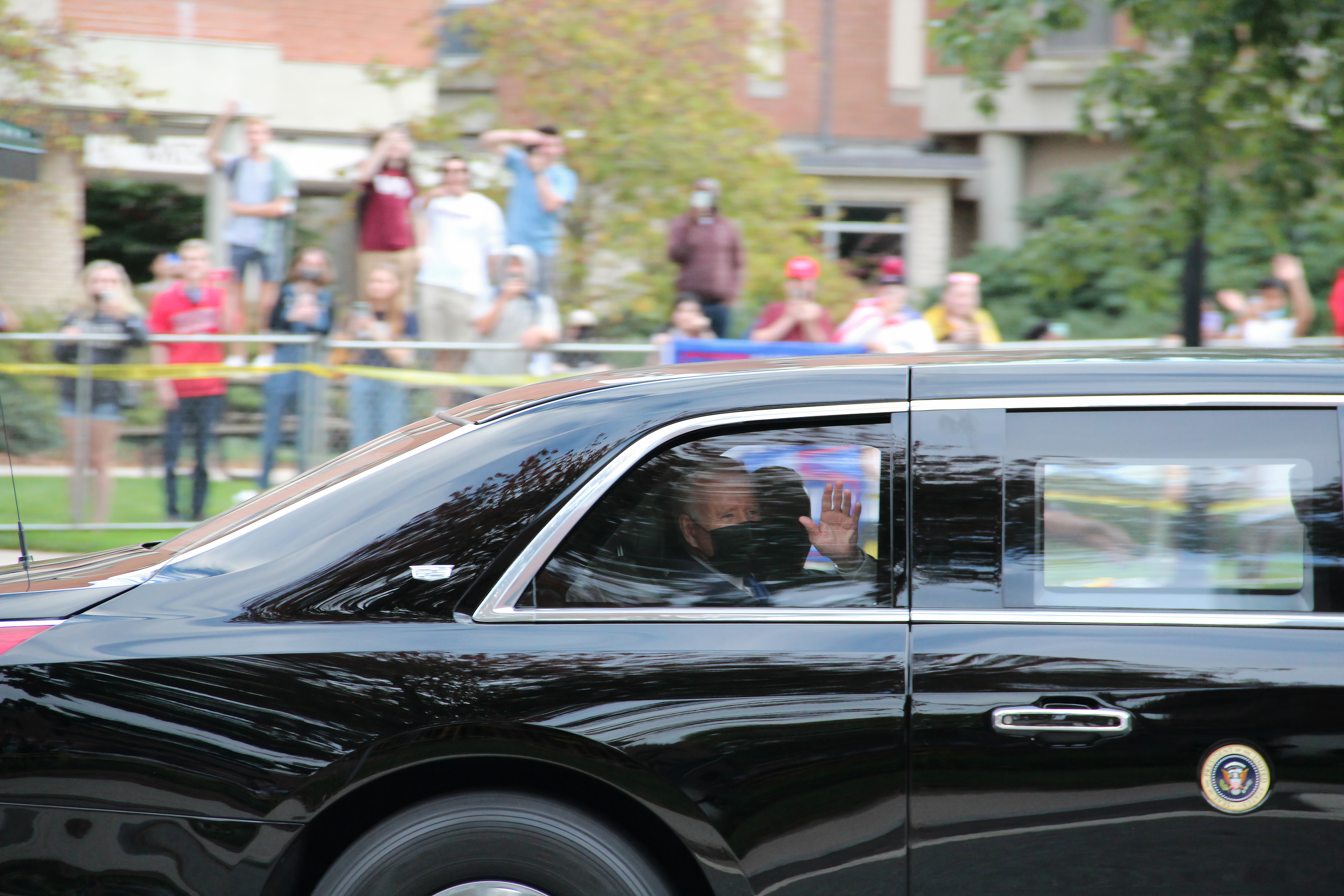
President Biden visiting UConn, October 15, 2021

An agreement was reached in 2012 to launch Jackson Laboratory's $1.1 billion genomic medicine lab on the Farmington UConn Health campus as part of the Bioscience Connecticut initiative. In 2013, Governor Dannel P. Malloy signed into law Next Generation Connecticut, committing $1.7 billion in funding over a decade to enhance UConn's infrastructure, hire additional faculty, and upgrade STEM initiatives.

Two U.S. presidents have visited the Storrs campus during their term of office, Bill Clinton in 1995 and Joe Biden in 2021, to dedicate the first and second iterations of the Dodd Center for Human Rights, respectively. The Dodd Center has brought an array of other world figures to the campus, including Madeleine Albright, Elie Wiesel, Oscar Arias, and Mikhail Gorbachev. Presidents Gerald Ford and George H. W. Bush visited the campus after leaving office.

== Campuses ==
=== Storrs campus ===
The primary and original UConn campus is in Storrs, a division of the Town of Mansfield, 22 miles (35 km) east of Hartford, Connecticut's capital, and bordered by the towns of Ashford, Coventry, Willington, and Windham. The campus is easily accessible from nearby thoroughfares US Route 6 in Windham and Interstate 84 in Tolland.

==== Libraries ====
The University of Connecticut Libraries form the largest public research collection in the state. The main library is the Homer D. Babbidge Library, on Fairfield Way in the center of campus. In 1882, Charles Storrs donated the first volumes to the university library collection (specifically, of the agriculture school). The university formerly housed its primary library collections in the Old Whitney building, one of the first agriculture school buildings. The library migrated from Old Main to the basement of Beech Hall in 1929. The university's first librarian was Edwina Whitney, who served from 1900 to 1934. The library then moved to the Wilbur Cross Building and remained there until the 1970s. The current main library, Homer Babbidge, was formerly known as the Nathan Hale Library. It underwent renovations completed in 1998; at the time it was the largest public research library in New England.The Storrs campus is also home to the university's Music and Pharmacy libraries, and the Thomas J. Dodd Research Center, home to the university's archives and special collections. Each of the regional campuses also have their own libraries. These libraries are tied into the Babbidge library through a shared catalogue.

The Babbidge-based collection places UConn among the top 30 universities in the nation for library holdings and funding, containing more than 2.5 million print volumes, approximately 2,500 current print periodicals, more than 35,000 journals through the eJournal locator, 2.8 million units of microfilm, 180,000 maps at the Map and Geographic Information Center (New England's largest public map collection), millions of electronic books, and an array of free electronic information sources. The UCL also license approximately 265 electronic search databases, many of which contain the full-text of research journals, monographs, and historic documents.

The Lyman Maynard Stowe Library, housed at UConn Health, was one of eight federally funded National Network of Libraries of Medicine libraries from 1991 to 2001. The University of Connecticut School of Law houses the School of Law Library at its campus in Hartford. The Stowe and Law libraries have catalogues separate from the Babbidge system, making the total library holdings of the University of Connecticut much higher than the 2.5 million print volumes of Babbidge. UConn participates in several outside library consortia, including the New England Law Library Consortium and the Northeast Research Libraries Consortium. The Dodd Research Center has also formed a partnership with the African National Congress to share materials with South African scholars.

==== Campus ====
The UConn campus at Storrs is home to the Connecticut Repertory Theatre (CRT) run by the Department of Dramatic Arts. The theatre complex has three venues, the 486-seat Harriet S. Jorgensen Theatre, the 241-seat Nafe Katter Theatre, and the 116-seat Studio Theatre. CRT is a member of the Theatre Communications Group, the national service organization for the professional theatre. The Storrs campus also houses the J. Louis von der Mehden Recital Hall, the William Benton Museum of Art, and the Ballard Institute and Museum of Puppetry.

In the 1960s, drama students from UConn participated in Theatre on Tour, which was an initiative to bring dramatic performances to "bring live drama to grass-roots theatre fans" across New England. They performed Lady Windemere's Fan, for instance, at Hotchkiss School in 1968.

UConn is the only institution in the United States that offers a master's degree in puppetry.Among the research facilities on campus is the George Safford Torrey Life Sciences Building. Built in 1961, in 1980 the building was named in honor of the former head of the botany department. The Torrey Life Sciences Building houses offices for the Department of Ecology and Evolutionary Biology, the Department of Physiology and Neurobiology, the Department of Molecular and Cell Biology, and Biology Central Services.

Because it is situated in a fairly rural area, the UConn campus has facilities that allow it to be virtually self-sufficient. All heat on campus is steam, and where possible sidewalks were laid over the underground connectors to keep the snow off. In 2005, a cogeneration plant was activated, which generates most of the electricity for the campus, and uses the exhaust steam for the campus central heating system. The university owns its own public water system and waste water treatment facility. With the support of local industry, UConn is also developing and using fuel cell technology. In April 2012, UConn commissioned a fuel cell power plant at its Depot Campus that will supply the campus with clean and efficiency energy, cooling and heating. The installation of a ClearEdge Power, formerly UTC Power, PureCell System was made possible through a federal stimulus grant from Connecticut's Clean Energy Finance and Investment Authority (now the Connecticut GreenBank).

UConn's main campus in Storrs

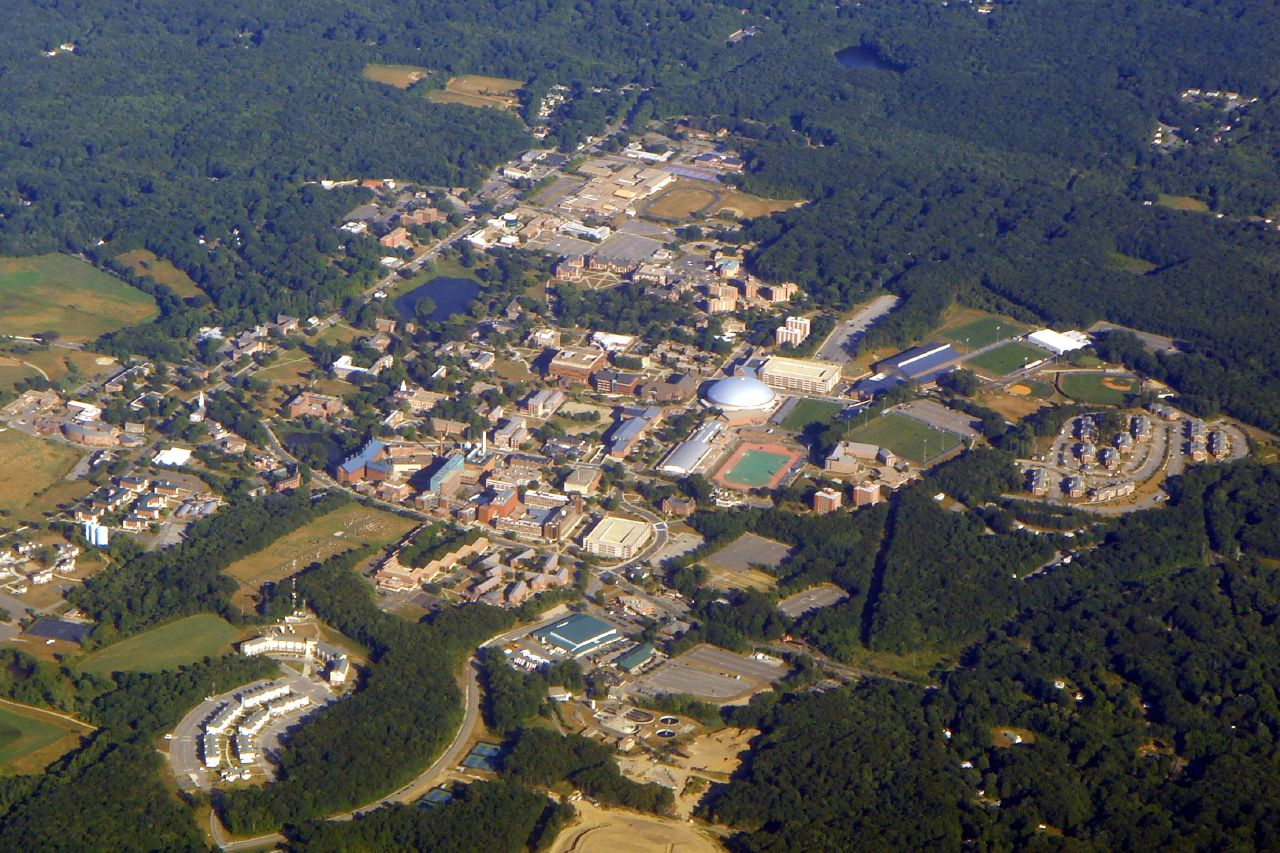
Aerial view of main campus

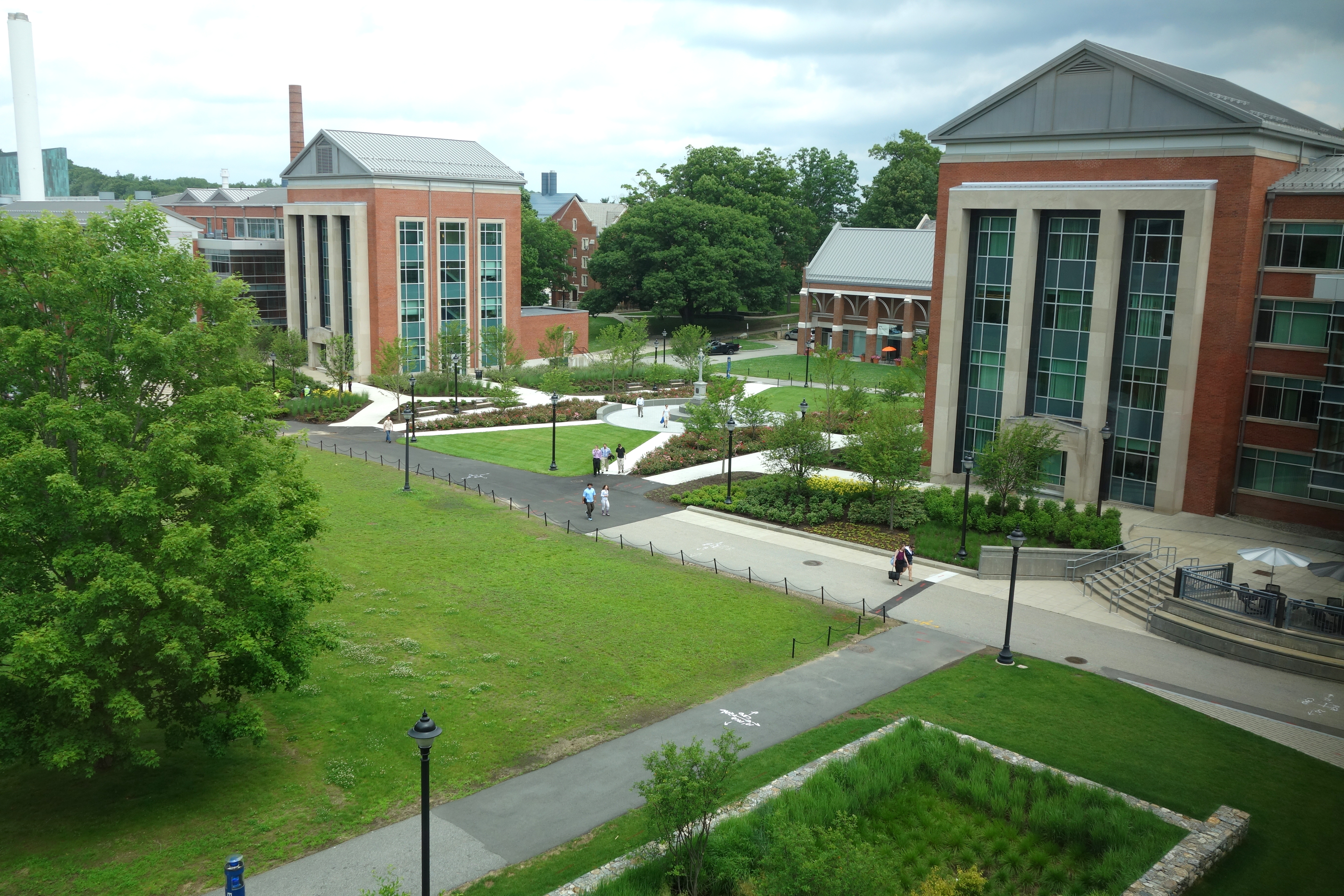
Main quad

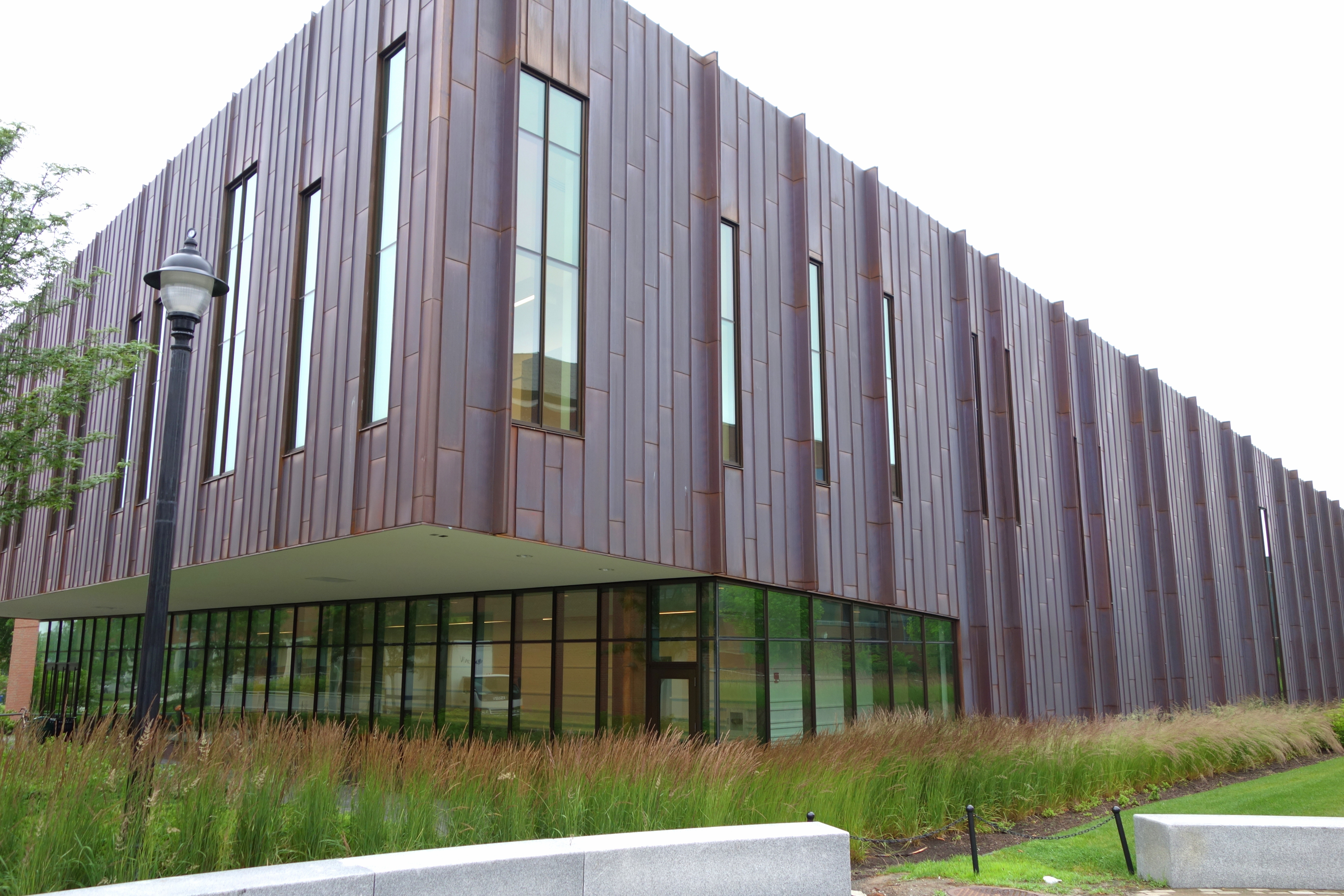
McHugh Hall

The University of Connecticut Police Department is a fully functional police agency with the same statutory authority as any municipal police department in the State of Connecticut. State and internationally accredited, the department is responsible for protecting lives and property at the University of Connecticut and all adjacent areas within the jurisdiction of the UConn Police Department. This includes the main campus in Storrs and the regional campuses. The UConn Division of Public Safety also includes the UConn Fire Department, and Office of the Fire Marshal and Building Inspectors. UConn campuses are equipped with a blue-light system which allows students to press an emergency button which will notify the police to come to that location.

Next Generation Connecticut is a multi-faceted $1.5 billion plan to build the state's economic future through strategic investments in science, technology, engineering, and math disciplines (STEM). It passed the Connecticut General Assembly and was signed into law by Governor Dannel Malloy in 2013. The funds will be used over a 10-year period to hire 250+ new faculty, increase undergraduate enrollment by 6,580 students, and upgrade aging campus infrastructure. Money has also been allocated to build new STEM facilities, construct new STEM teaching laboratories and to create a premier STEM honors college. NextGenCT will also allow for the construction of student housing and a digital media center at the Stamford campus, and allow for the relocation of the Greater Hartford campus back to downtown Hartford.

=== Avery Point campus ===
UConn's Avery Point campus overlooks Long Island Sound in the town of Groton. It is home to the National Undersea Research Center, the Connecticut Sea Grant College, Project Oceanology, the Long Island Sound Resource Center, and the Alexey von Schlippe Gallery of Art. The campus has undergone a transformation in recent years, including new Marine Science and Project Oceanology buildings, a new research vessel, and renovations of the Branford House, the gymnasium, and the main Academic Building.

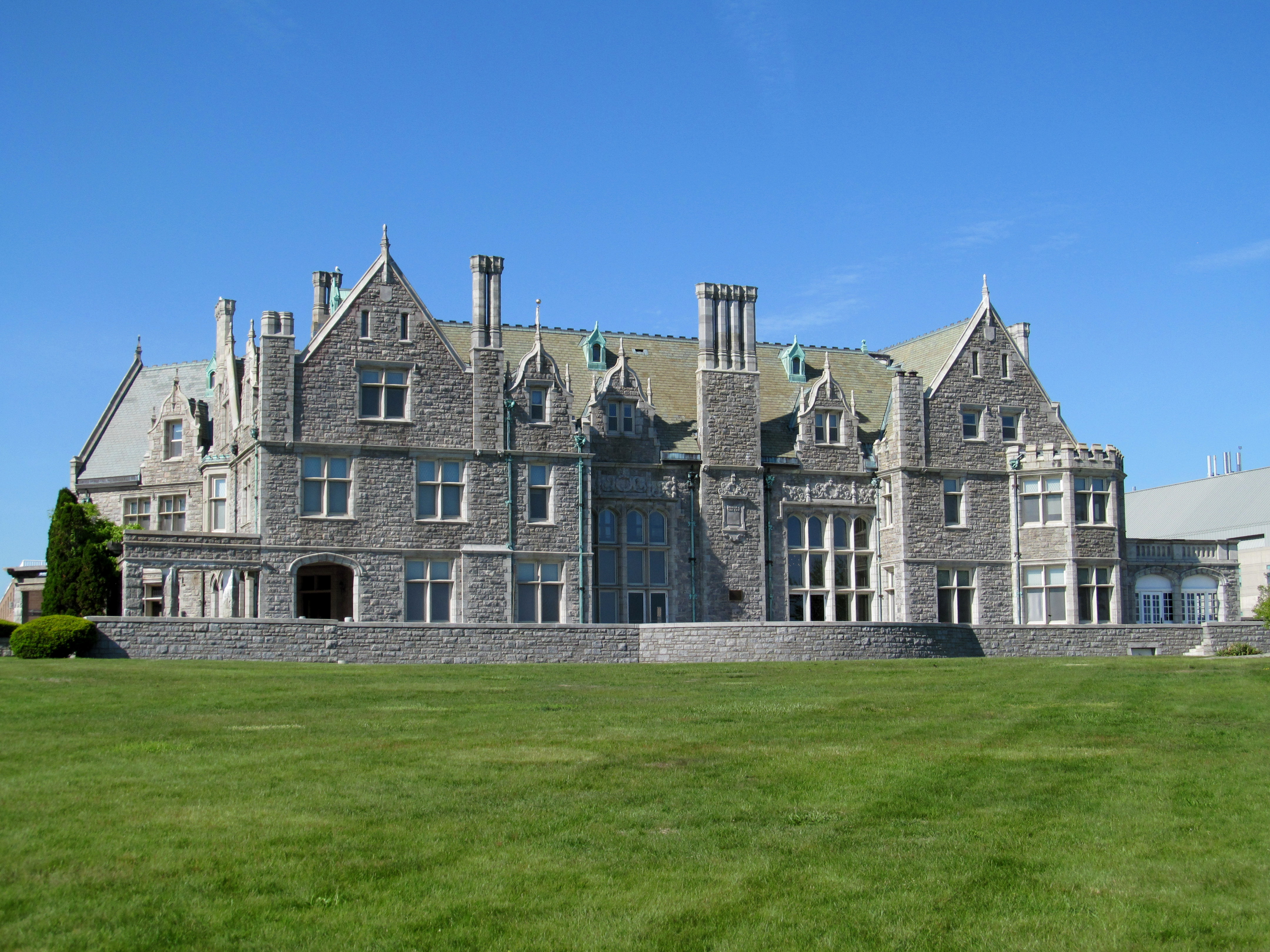
Branford House on the Avery Point campus

The campus was formerly the summer home of Morton Freeman Plant, a 19th-century railroad, steamship, and hotel magnate. Branford House was his mansion overlooking Long Island Sound, completed in 1904. The estate included what is now the Shennecossett Public Golf Course, which was turned over to the State of Connecticut in the 1930s. During World War II, the remaining portion of the Plant estate was leased to the Coast Guard as a training center, and the Avery Point Light was built. It was later converted into the University of Connecticut at Avery Point. Avery Point is the only regional campus that sponsors their own athletic program. They compete in the NJCAA.

=== Stamford campus ===
In 1951, the University of Connecticut began offering extension courses at the former Stamford High School to provide education for GIs returning from the Korean War. In the fall of 1952, the university formally established a regional campus in Stamford. Upon inception, UConn's Stamford Campus offered five courses — English, Mathematics, History, Speech, and Sociology, and enrolled 21 part-time students.

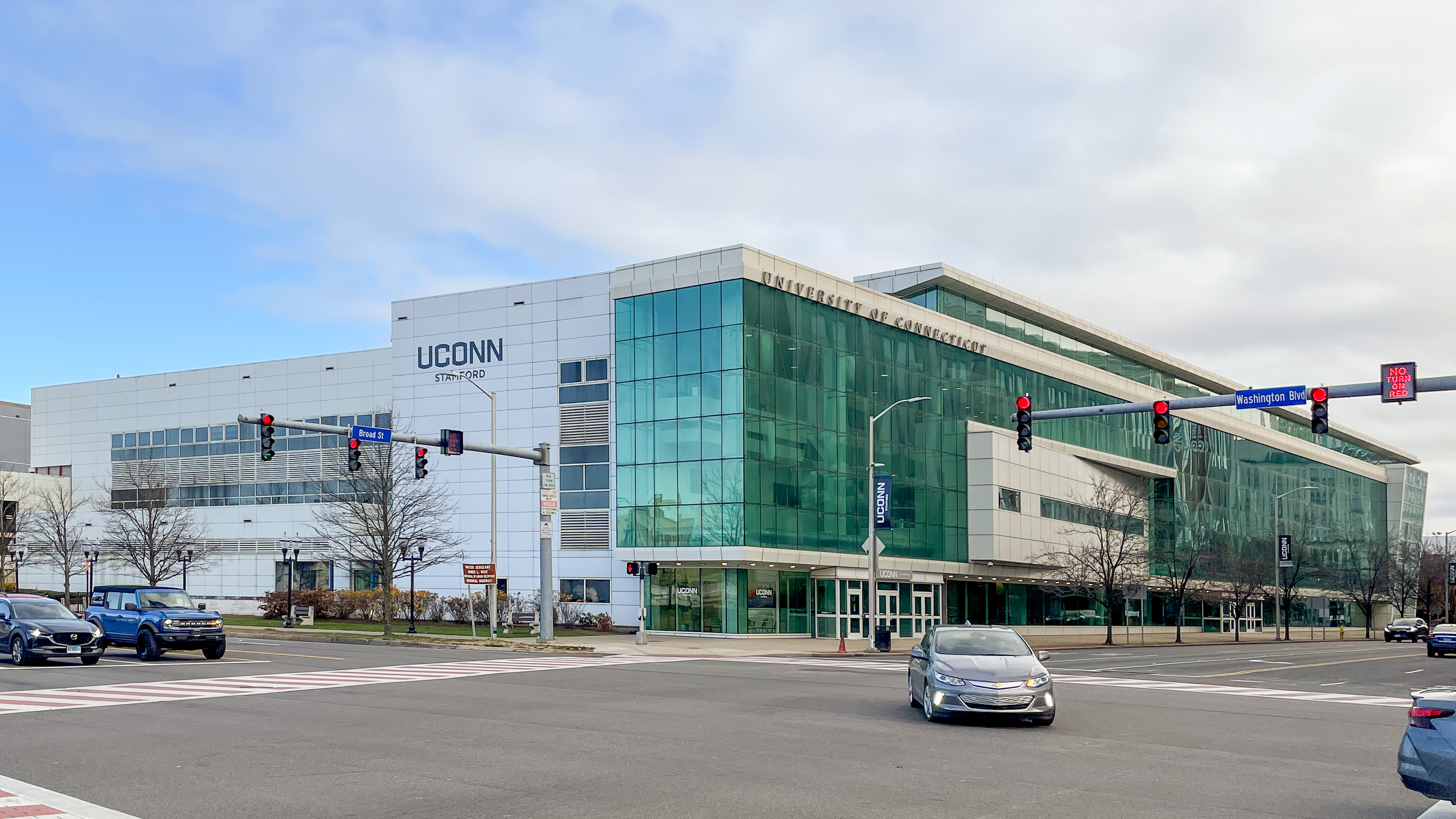
UConn's Main Campus building in Downtown Stamford

A newly constructed UConn Stamford Campus opened in 1962 on Scofield Town Road, and a separate library building was added in 1974. Also in the mid-1970s, the academic program was expanded to provide a four-year degree in several fields of study.

In 1990, planning began for a new UConn Stamford Campus in the heart of downtown Stamford. One of the first UConn 2000 building projects, the new campus opened in 1998, offering a variety of academic programs including undergraduate and graduate degrees. The contemporary glass-enclosed campus features a high-tech approach to learning with internet access in classrooms, laboratories, student amenities and public spaces. Design for the new UConn building was led by Aaron Schwarz, then of Perkins Eastman.

In August 2017, UConn's first-ever permanent residence hall for students outside the Storrs campus was opened at Stamford. The six-story, 116 unit building is intended to house 290 students.

=== Hartford campus ===
In August 2017, UConn formally opened its new campus in downtown Hartford, after nearly 40 years in neighboring West Hartford. The new campus is located within Hartford's Front Street neighborhood—a portion of the Adriaen's Landing project. The centerpiece of the new campus is the historic Beaux-Arts, which had been the former headquarters of the Hartford Times.

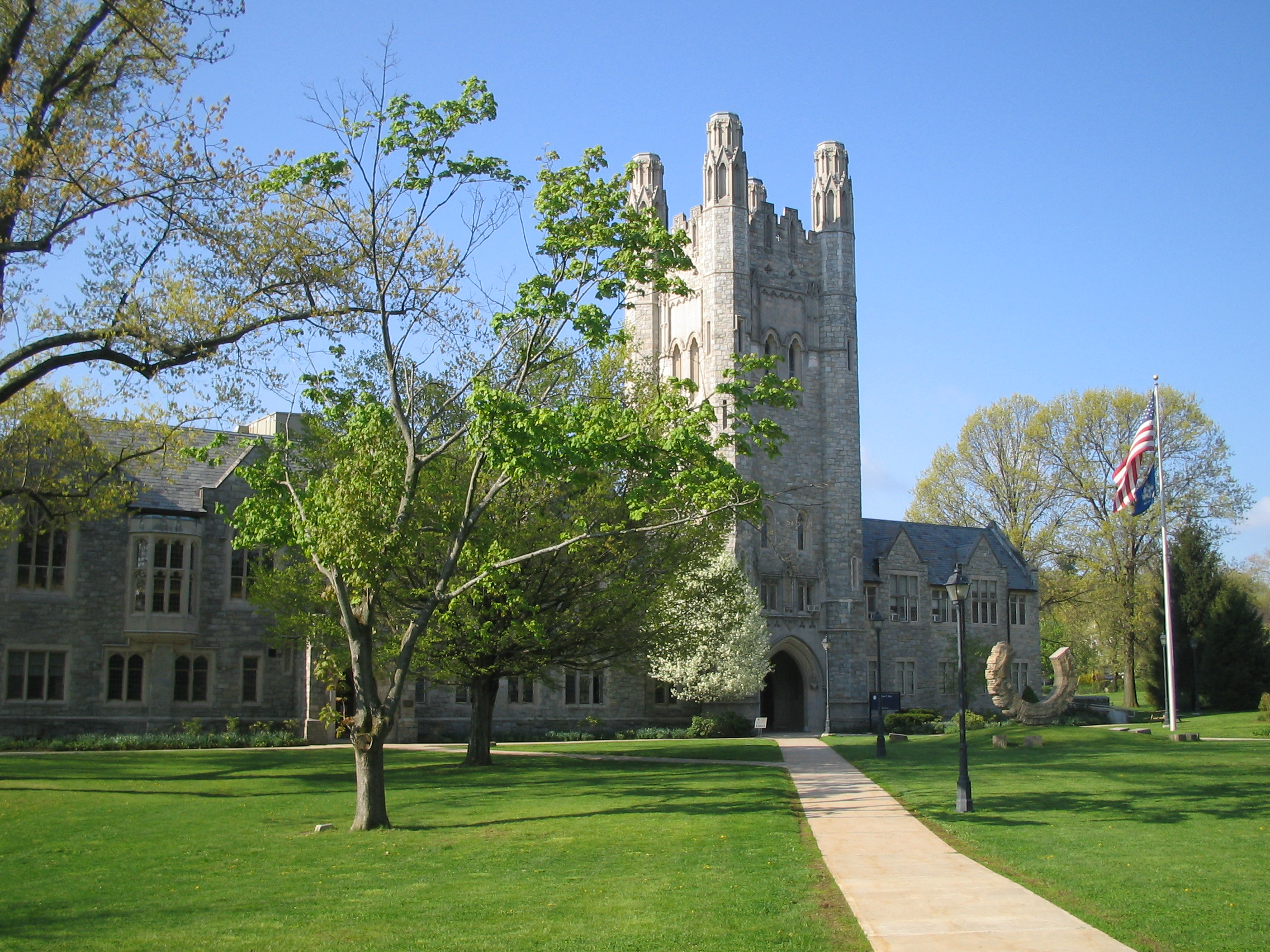
Starr Hall on the School of Law campus in Hartford

UConn Hartford offers a wide range of liberal arts and sciences courses and degrees to over 1,400 undergraduate and more than 600 graduate students. Due to the UConn Hartford's proximity to the State Capitol and legislative offices, the university's School of Public Policy is based at the Hartford campus.

The University of Connecticut's School of Social Work, established in 1948, sits alongside the University's Hartford Campus.

Located at Constitution Plaza in downtown Hartford, the UConn School of Business Graduate Business Learning Center offers three MBA programs as well as graduate degree programs and graduate certificate programs.

=== Waterbury campus ===
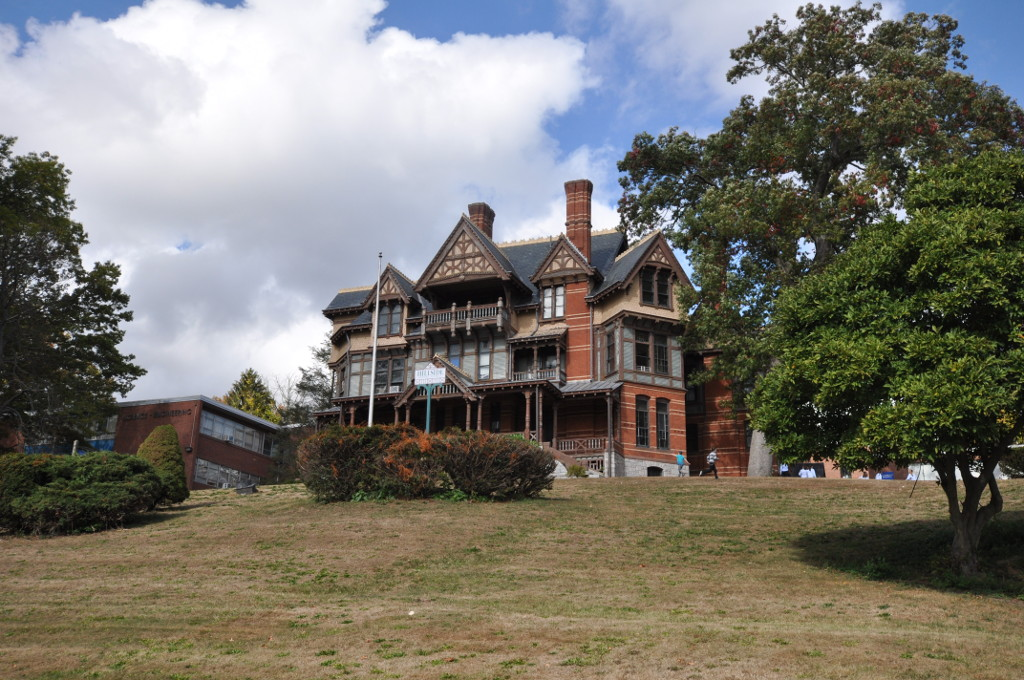
University of Connecticut campus in Waterbury, 1955–2003

In 1942, the University of Connecticut was invited to Waterbury at the request of a group of citizens, headed by the Waterbury YMCA. Named the Waterbury Extension Center, it offered primarily certificate-granting technical courses taught at the YMCA for 253 students who were mostly of returning veterans looking for an affordable and easily accessible means of earning and education. Gradually, as the demand for courses grew, and enrollment increased, certain facilities at Leavenworth High School were used. Each semester about a dozen undergraduate courses were offered and a sizeable non-credit program was added. Four years later in the fall of 1946, the local Advisory Committee, working with the local Board of Education, secured the Begnal School on Charles Street.

In addition to the facilities on Charles Street, the Central YMCA allocated some space in their building for evening classes. The enrollment during this period increased to 662 students in the fall of 1947 and the establishment of an accredited, full-time undergraduate program, at the newly designated Waterbury Branch of the University of Connecticut.

In August 2003, the Waterbury campus moved to a new 95,000 square foot downtown campus. The U-shaped, three-story building at the intersection of East Main Street and Phoenix Avenue was designed to serve more than 1,200 students, faculty and staff, replacing the collection of buildings and houses that has served the Waterbury campus for decades. The new facility was dedicated on October 9, 2003. In January 2016, UConn Waterbury dedicated the newly renovated St. Patrick's Hall also known as the Rectory as the newest addition to its campus. The Rectory Building added two floors of classroom and office space with the fourth floor of the building serving as both a classroom and event space.The University of Connecticut's Waterbury campus serves more than 1,000 students annually and offers nine four-year undergraduate degrees.

=== Torrington campus ===
The University of Connecticut at Torrington, founded in 1957, was closed in May 2016 due to low enrollment numbers.

=== Jackson Laboratory ===
In January 2012, Governor Malloy announced that Jackson Laboratory (JAX) had reached an agreement to launch a $1.1 billion genomic medicine laboratory on the campus of UConn Health. The laboratory is an independent, nonprofit biomedical research institution based in Bar Harbor, Maine.

According to the agreement, Jackson Laboratory will enter into a collaborative research agreement with UConn Health and will create at least 300 positions within 10 years, 30 percent of total employees being senior scientist positions. Once fully developed, the facility is projected to employ 600 scientists and technicians. The state of Connecticut has approved $291 million of the total capital and research budget; Jackson Laboratory will raise the balance of $860 million through federal research grants, philanthropy, and service income.

== Academics ==
The University of Connecticut is accredited by the New England Commission of Higher Education.

=== Undergraduate ===
Students at UConn can pursue over 100 majors, eight undergraduate degrees, 17 graduate degrees and five professional degree programs across 10 schools and colleges. Students choose from 87 different minors at UConn, including areas of study not offered as formalized majors.

UConn participates in the New England Board of Higher Education's Regional Student Program (NERSP), allowing students from the five other New England states to enroll at the university at a reduced out-of-state tuition rate if their intended major is not offered by one of their in-state universities. The university also participates in a special guaranteed admissions program with the Connecticut Community Colleges (CCC) that is designed for academically qualified students who are attending a Connecticut community college and who are planning to transfer to the University of Connecticut in Liberal Arts & Sciences, Agriculture, Health & Natural Resources, Business, or Engineering. Each year, more than 1,000 transfer students are admitted to the university.

==== Undergraduate admission, retention, and graduation ====
As of 2017, of the entering freshmen at the main campus, 54% ranked in the top tenth of their high school class and 89% in the top quarter. UConn's retention rate is among the best for public universities in the nation, with 93% of students returning for their sophomore year. UConn ranks third out of 58 public research universities on basis of graduation time, with the average time to graduate being 4.2 years among those who graduate within 6 years.For the 2024–2025 academic year, the middle 50% of enrolled students scored between 1210 and 1420 on the SAT (with a 50th percentile of 1330), between 610 and 710 on the SAT Evidence-Based Reading and Writing section (50th percentile: 670), and between 600 and 730 on the SAT Math section (50th percentile: 670).

=== Graduate and postgraduate ===
Bachelor's, master's, and doctoral programs are offered through the College of Liberal Arts and Sciences, College of Agriculture, Health, and Natural Resources, the Graduate School, the Neag School of Education, the School of Nursing, the School of Business, the School of Dental Medicine, the School of Medicine, the School of Engineering, the School of Social Work, the Ratcliffe Hicks School of Agriculture, the School of Pharmacy, the School of Law and the School of Fine Arts.

Founded in 1921, the University of Connecticut School of Law is accredited by the American Bar Association and is a member of the Association of American Law Schools. The campus is located just outside the downtown core of Hartford, minutes away from the Connecticut State Capitol, state courts and agencies, and the offices of Hartford's law firms and corporations. Law students have ready access to all of these institutions for study, externships, clinical education, practice, and employment. The campus is listed on the National Register of Historic Places. Its gothic-style buildings, constructed in 1925 (except for the new library, which was completed in 1996), housed the Hartford Seminary until 1981.

The law school has approximately 325 students and a student-faculty ratio of 4.1:1. UConn Law has repeatedly been ranked the top public law school in New England by U.S. News & World Report, and was most recently in 2020 ranked 52nd of American law schools. There are four scholarly journals edited on campus: the Connecticut Law Review, the Connecticut Public Interest Law Journal, the Connecticut Insurance Law Journal, and the Connecticut Journal of International Law.

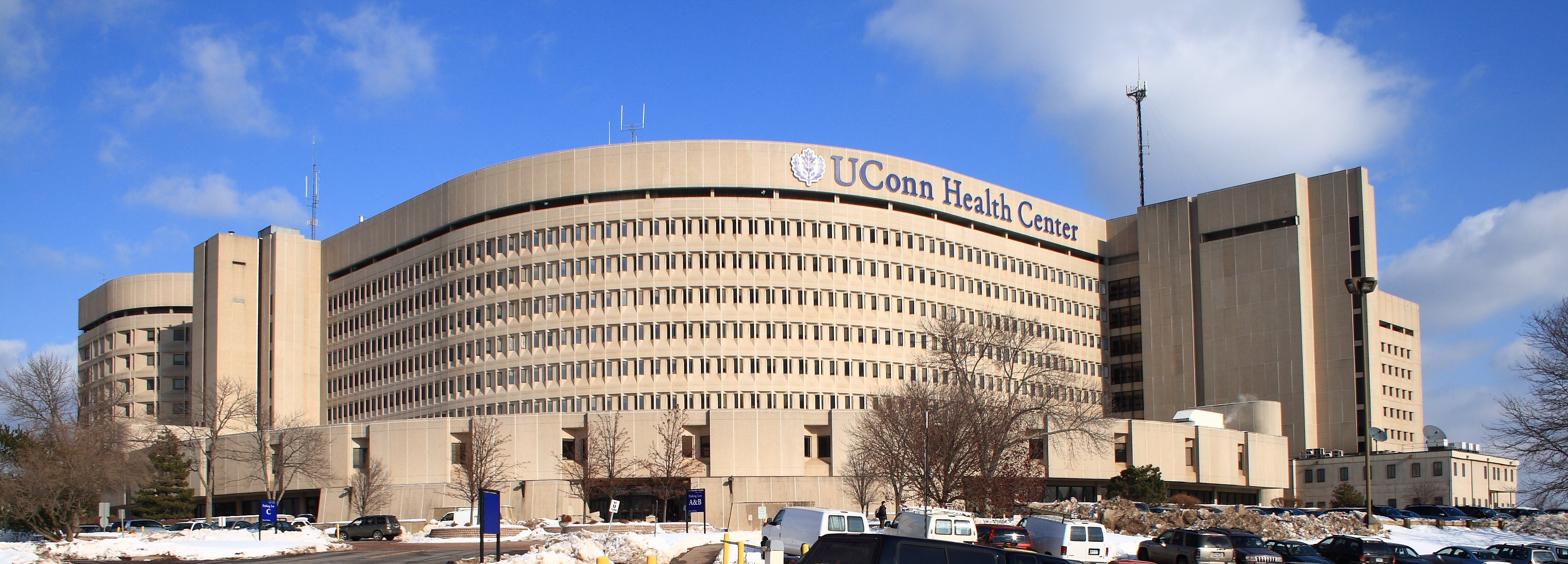
UConn Health, located in Farmington

=== Research ===
According to the National Science Foundation, UConn spent $269 million on research and development in 2018, ranking it 88th in the nation. In 2005, UConn ranked 64th in terms of R&D expenditure.

=== Rankings and reputation ===
Academic rankings

National
- Forbes: 74
- U.S. News & World Report: 70 (tie)
- Washington Monthly: 83
- WSJ/College Pulse: 46

Global
- ARWU: 301–400
- QS: 534
- THE: 351–400
- U.S. News & World Report: 315 (tie)

National program rankings
Program	Ranking
Audiology	30
Biological Sciences	85
Business	79
Chemistry	81
Clinical Psychology	62
Computer Science	82
Earth Sciences	111
Economics	78
Education	25
Engineering	67
English	77
Fine Arts	131
History	69
Law	52
Mathematics	71
Medicine: Primary Care	31
Medicine: Research	52
Nursing: Doctorate	40
Nursing: Master's	46
Pharmacy	33
Physical Therapy	64
Physics	71
Political Science	65
Psychology	53
Public Affairs	47
Public Health	78
Social Work	36
Sociology	63
Speech-Language Pathology	30
Statistics	44

Global subject rankings
Program	Ranking
Agricultural Sciences	240
Arts & Humanities	93
Biology & Biochemistry	298
Chemistry	429
Clinical Medicine	283
Economics & Business	182
Engineering	356
Environment/Ecology	116
Immunology	235
Materials Science	360
Microbiology	115
Molecular Biology & Genetics	283
Neuroscience & Behavior	285
Pharmacology & Toxicology	205
Physics	450
Plant & Animal Science	279
Psychiatry/Psychology	125
Social Sciences & Public Health	179

- The university was ranked tied for 23rd among public universities in the U.S. and tied for 63rd among national universities in 2021 by U.S. News & World Report.
- Kiplinger's Personal Finance named UConn the 33rd best value in public higher education for 2019 (26th on the basis of out-of-state tuition).
- The University of Connecticut was among the top 10 producers of Fulbright Scholars from research institutions in 2017.
- The 2015 Sierra Club "Cool Schools" list of environmentally responsible universities ranked UConn eighth in the U.S.

== Student life ==
Undergraduate demographics as of Fall 2023
Race and ethnicity	Total
White	50%
Hispanic	16%
Asian	13%
International student	8%
Black	7%
Two or more races	5%
Unknown	1%
Economic diversity
Low-income (Note: The percentage of students who received an income-based federal Pell grant intended for low-income students.)	24%
Affluent (Note: The percentage of students who are a part of the American middle class at the bare minimum.)	76%

=== Student organizations ===
There is a wide variety of student organizations on campus, including fraternities and sororities, musical groups, and religious, athletic, political, cultural, business, military, artistic, and community service clubs.

The university's daily student-run newspaper, The Daily Campus, is one of the longest continually-published college newspapers in the nation and serves as the primary news source for students and the greater campus area. WHUS FM 91.7, UConn's student-run radio station, serves a similar function providing entertainment programming.

Multiple organizations program student-focused events through funding obtained from student fees, including an undergraduate student government and a group of students who host events at the school's student union.

Since 2003, UConn has established university-owned Greek housing in the "Husky Village," created an Office of Fraternity and Sorority Life, and hired full-time staff to administer a Greek Life program.

=== Symbols ===
Until 1933, the mascot of UConn had been the "Aggies", because of the university's original agricultural nature. In 1933, the university changed its name from Connecticut Agricultural College to Connecticut State College. To reflect this change, athletic teams were then known as the "Statesmen". In December 1934, the Husky was chosen as the mascot.

Jonathan the Husky, the school's mascot, is portrayed both as a traditional anthropomorphic character at athletic and student events and by a real Siberian Husky dog. Jonathan received his name as part of a student newspaper poll in 1935 after Jonathan Trumbull, the last colonial governor of Connecticut.

The school's fight song, officially titled "UConn Husky" was written by Herbert A. France. It is one of the most recognizable in the country, played by the Pride of Connecticut, UConn's marching band, during the school's sporting events. Many of UConn's athletic events are nationally broadcast, owing to the song's recognizability. A later version of the song was arranged by UConn music professor Dr. David Maker.

=== Traditions ===
The main UConn campus is also home to a "spirit rock", which has been painted to promote student events and ideologies since the 1940s. The current rock is a portion of a much larger outcropping that was originally located across from the North Campus quadrangle and removed for construction of the Life Sciences building in 1958. In subsequent years, it was put into storage during the UCONN 2000 construction program and later re-located in 2008, 2013 and 2024.

UConn officials measured the paint's depth with a small drill in the fall of 2018, and determined that 1.25 inches had accumulated on the rock since it was placed on that site in 2008.Student organizations regularly host annual events, including concerts, pep rallies, guest speaker engagements, and social events like "One Ton Sundae" wherein students receive free scoops from a large quantity of ice cream.

=== Community and tourism ===
The town of Mansfield's "downtown" area developments have been popular with UConn students, nearby residents, and visitors. Developed as a long-term construction project in the early 2000s, the "downtown" area is designed to be a mixed-use town center that includes retail shops, restaurants, offices, and housing. Current notable tenants include a Price Chopper supermarket and a UConn Health Urgent Care.

Students are eligible for free in-state bus and rail transportation as part of the U-Pass program from the Connecticut Department of Transportation. Student groups also regularly organize excursion trips to local and regional destinations.

The main university campus also includes attractions such as the Jorgensen Center for the Performing Arts, the J. Robert Donnelly Husky Heritage Sports Museum, the William Benton Museum of Art, the Ballard Institute and Museum of Puppetry and the Connecticut State Museum of Natural History. The UConn Dairy Bar, an ice cream parlor and creamery attached to the school's agricultural program, has been operational since the 1950s and is often regarded as serving the state's best ice cream. It serves roughly 200,000 customers annually.

=== Campus safety ===
In 2014, the University of Connecticut and Brown University had the highest "total of reports of rape" on their main campus, with 43 each. A 2016 study showed, however, that rates of sexual violence at the university were lower than the national average.

== Athletics ==
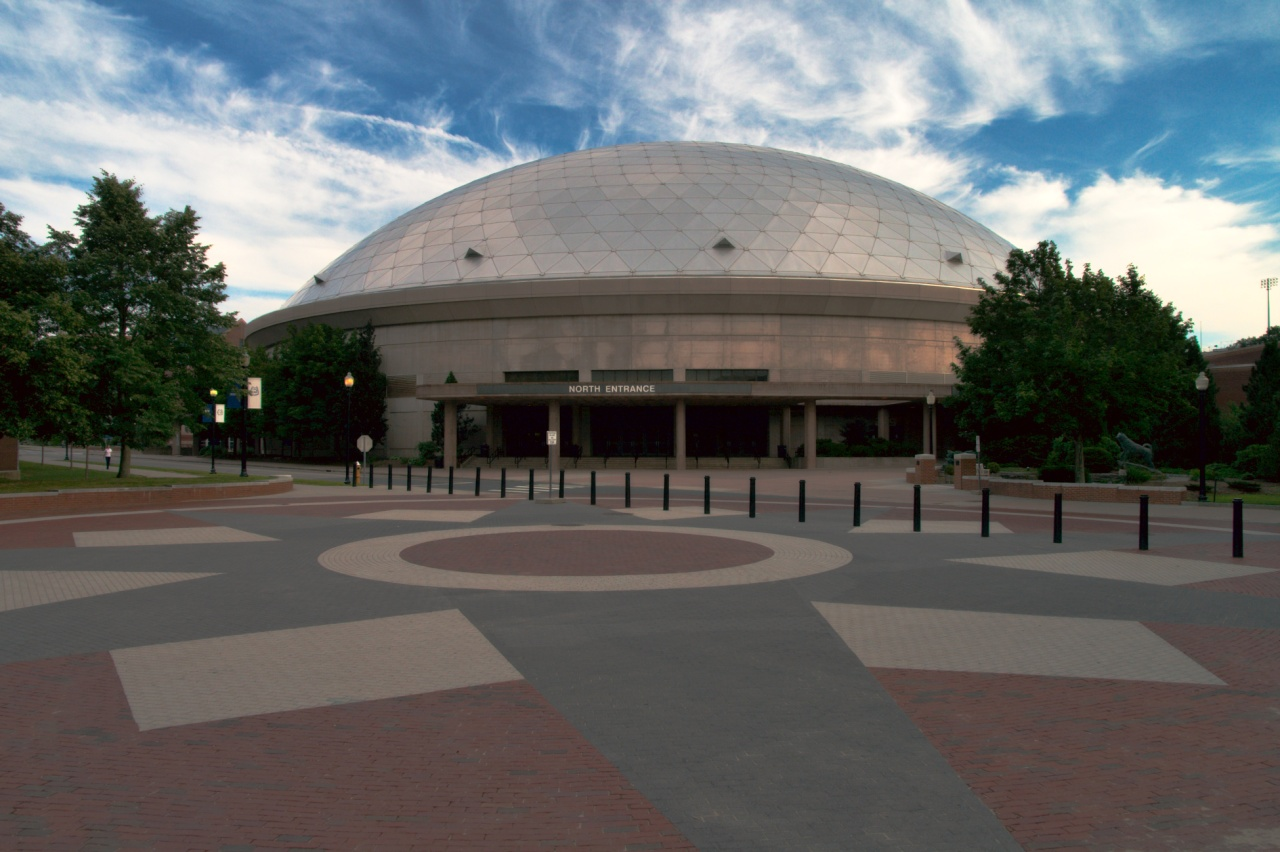
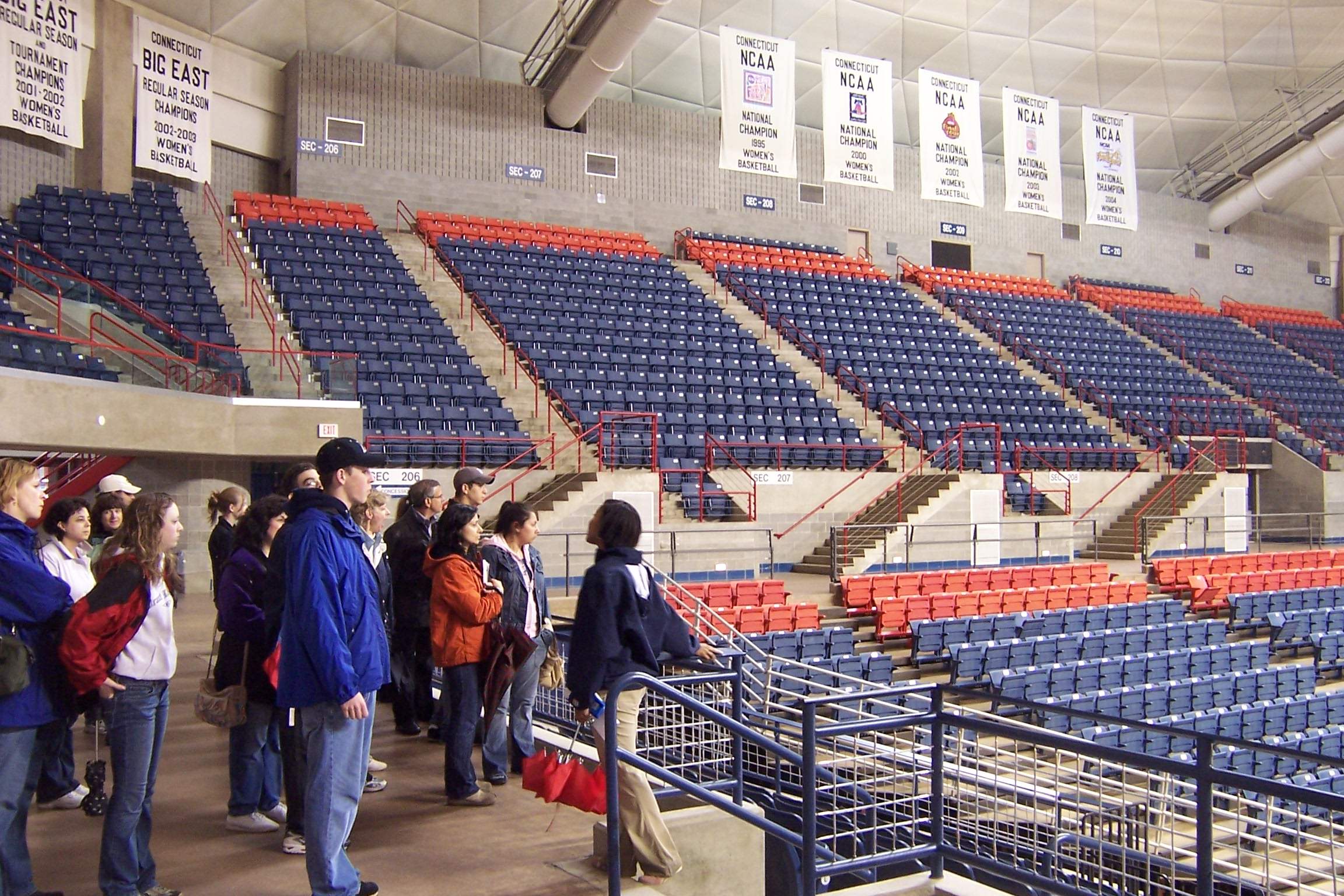
Exterior and interior views of the Gampel Pavilion, where some of the prospective students who tour the campus each year are shown the basketball teams' championship banners

The University of Connecticut athletic teams are nicknamed the "Huskies" and compete at the NCAA's Division I level and in the Football Bowl Subdivision. UConn moved to the American Athletic Conference in most sports in 2013; the Huskies were a charter member of The American when it was founded in 1979 as the original Big East Conference, and were the only remaining charter member of that league. In 2019, UConn accepted a formal invitation to join the Big East Conference following a unanimous vote of the conference's members. The Huskies began playing in the Big East in the 2020–2021 season in all twenty sports except for football and men's/women's ice hockey. UConn men's ice hockey became a full member of Hockey East in 2014–15. The women's hockey team will remain in the Hockey East as well, as they were founding conference members in 2002 when the league began women's ice hockey competition. The football program did not return to the AAC and began to play as an FBS Independent starting in the 2020–2021 season. Regardless of football conference affiliation, the school has publicly committed to competing in the NCAA Division I Football Bowl Subdivision for the foreseeable future.

UConn is most well known for its men's and women's basketball teams, both of which are considered among the best programs in the country with a combined total of 18 National Championships, the most combined from any program in NCAA history.

The UConn Women's teams have won an NCAA record of 12 National Championships, with their most recent in 2025, cementing Head Coach Geno Auriemma as the winningest head coach in history in both wins and National Titles. Alongside the Women, the Men's teams have won 6 National Championships since 1999, going back to back in 2024 under the leadership of Head Coach Dan Hurley. UConn is the only Division I school to win the men's and women's basketball titles in the same year, and has done it twice: in 2004 and 2014. Accolades have earned Connecticut the popular nickname "Basketball Capital of the World."

The university elevated its football program to the Football Bowl Subdivision in 2002, although the school first fielded a team in 1896. UConn became the quickest program to go from FBS elevation to a Bowl Championship Series game when it played in the 2011 Tostitos Fiesta Bowl. UConn has now played in a total of six bowl games. With the growth of the football program, in 2003 UConn football moved to 38,000-seat Rentschler Field in East Hartford, CT to host its home games.

UConn's updated Husky logo, designed by Nike, has appeared on all athletic uniforms since the fall 2013 season.

== Alumni ==
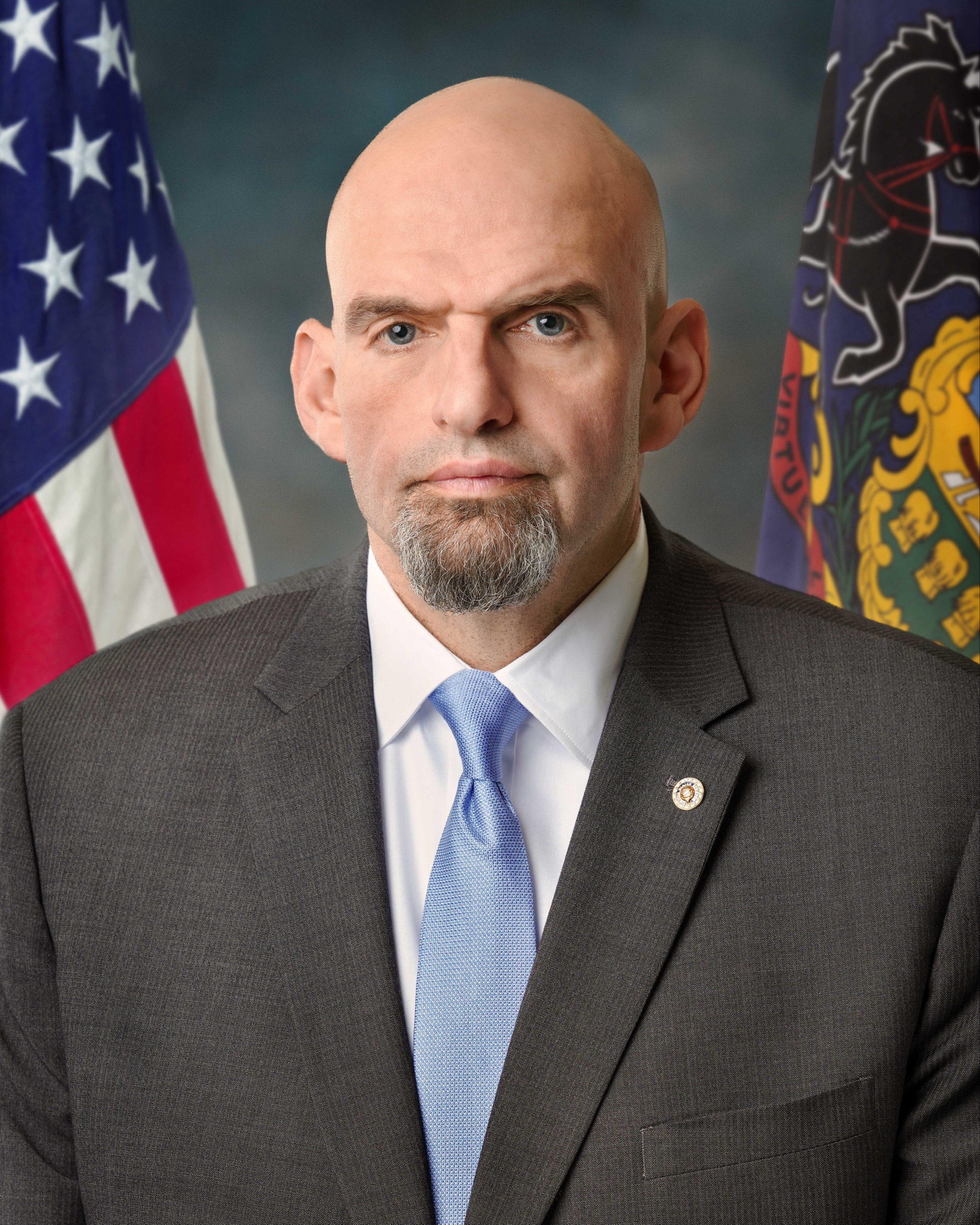
John Fetterman, U.S. senator from Pennsylvania

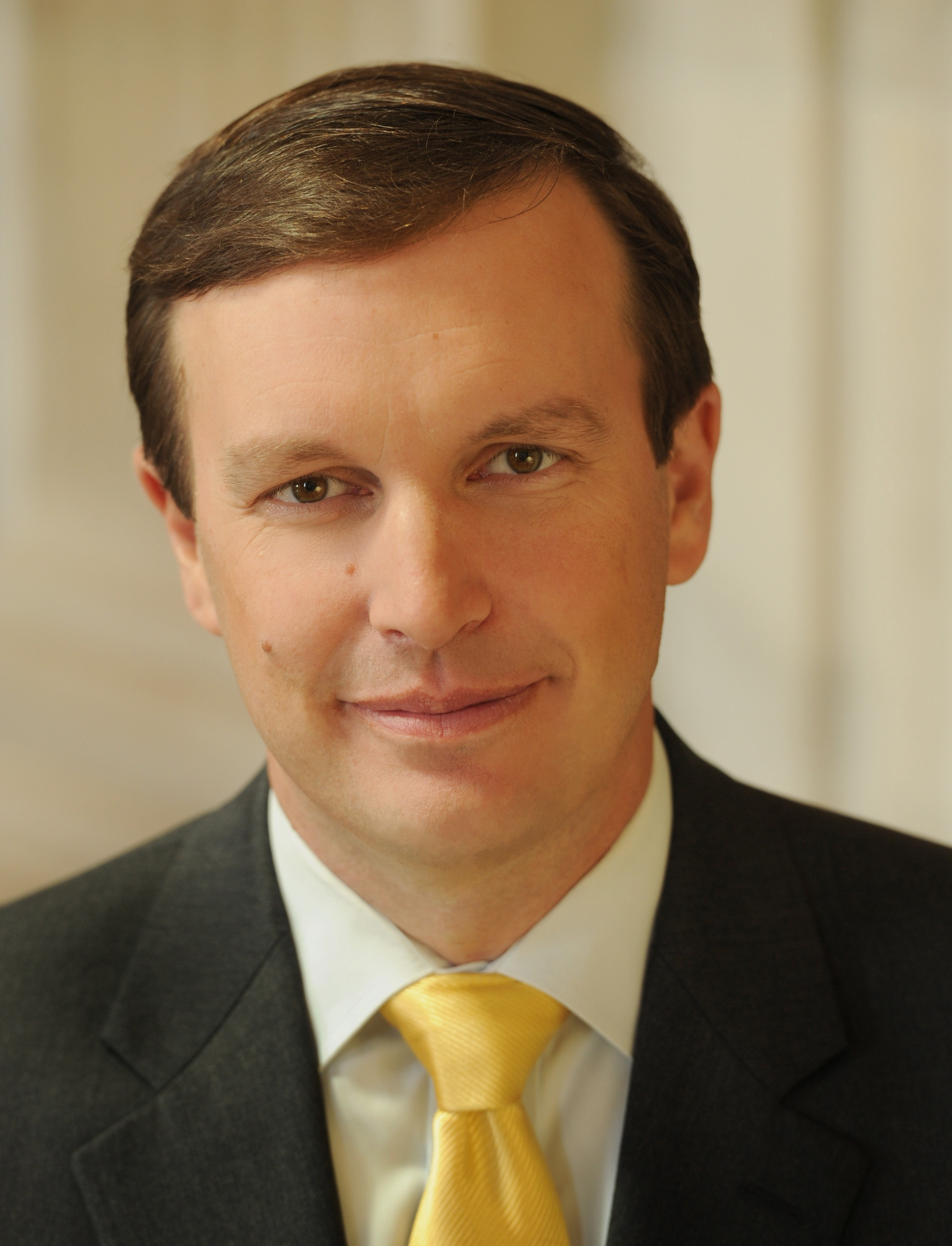
Chris Murphy, U.S. senator from Connecticut

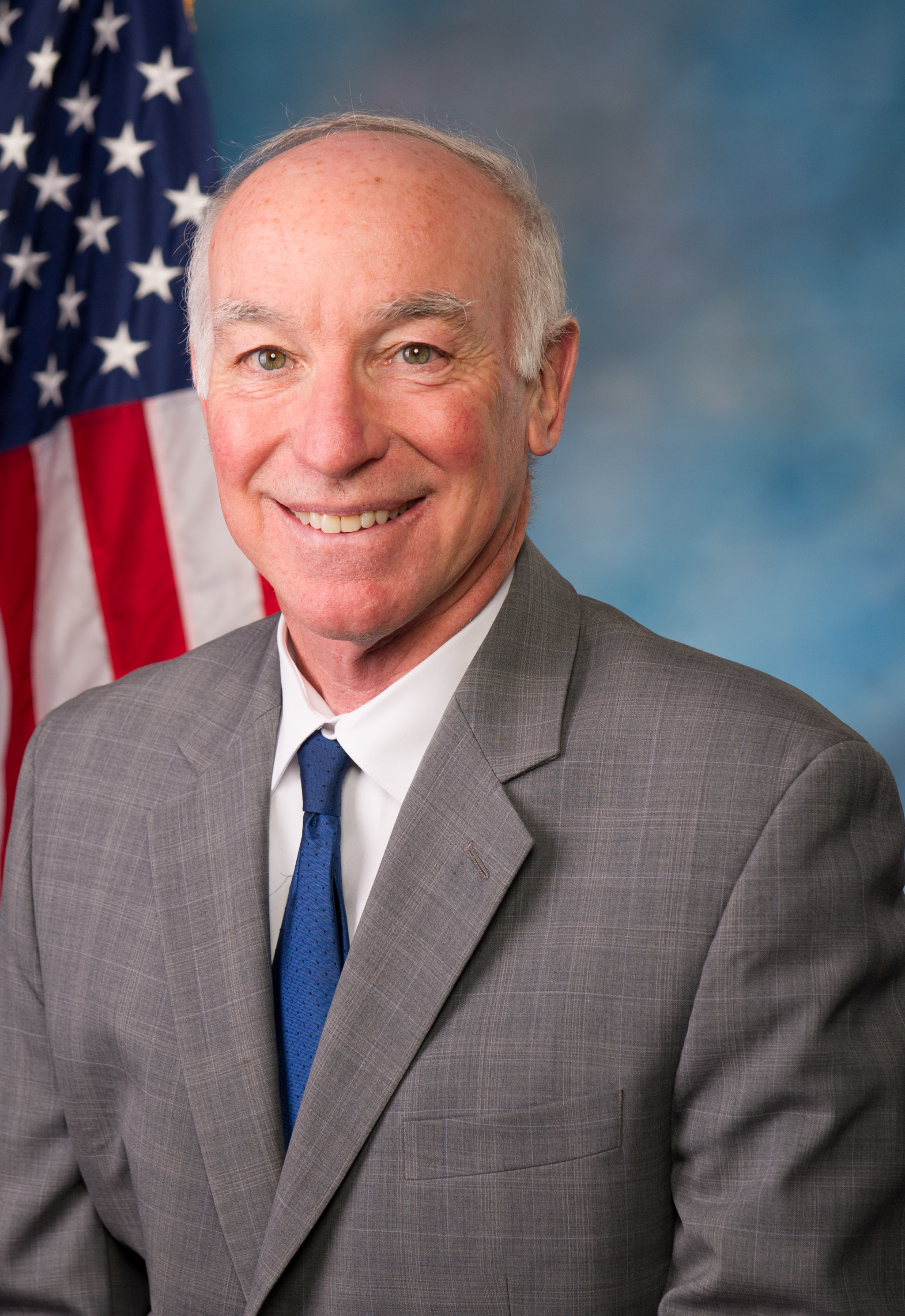
Joe Courtney, U.S. congressman

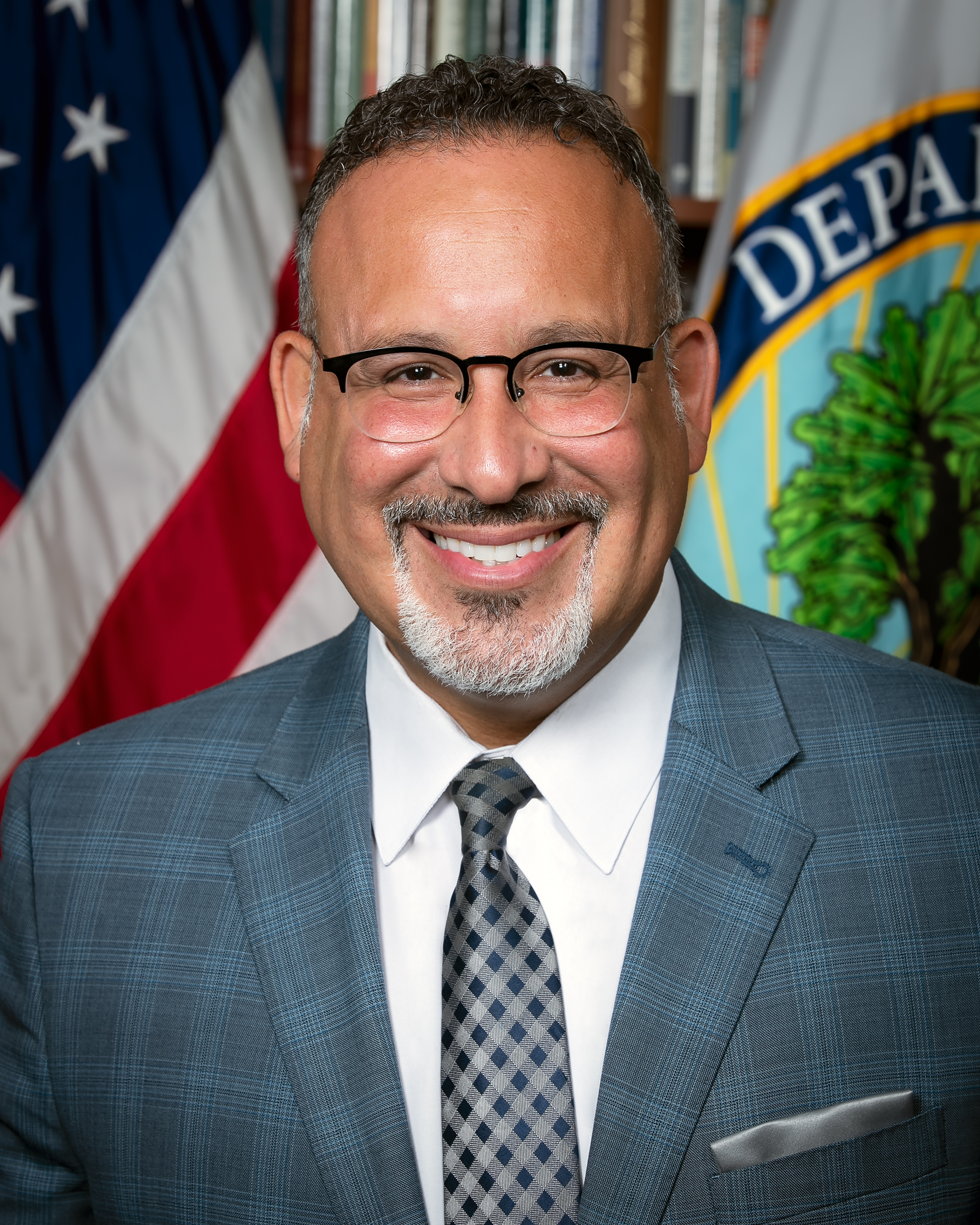
Miguel Cardona, 12th United States secretary of education

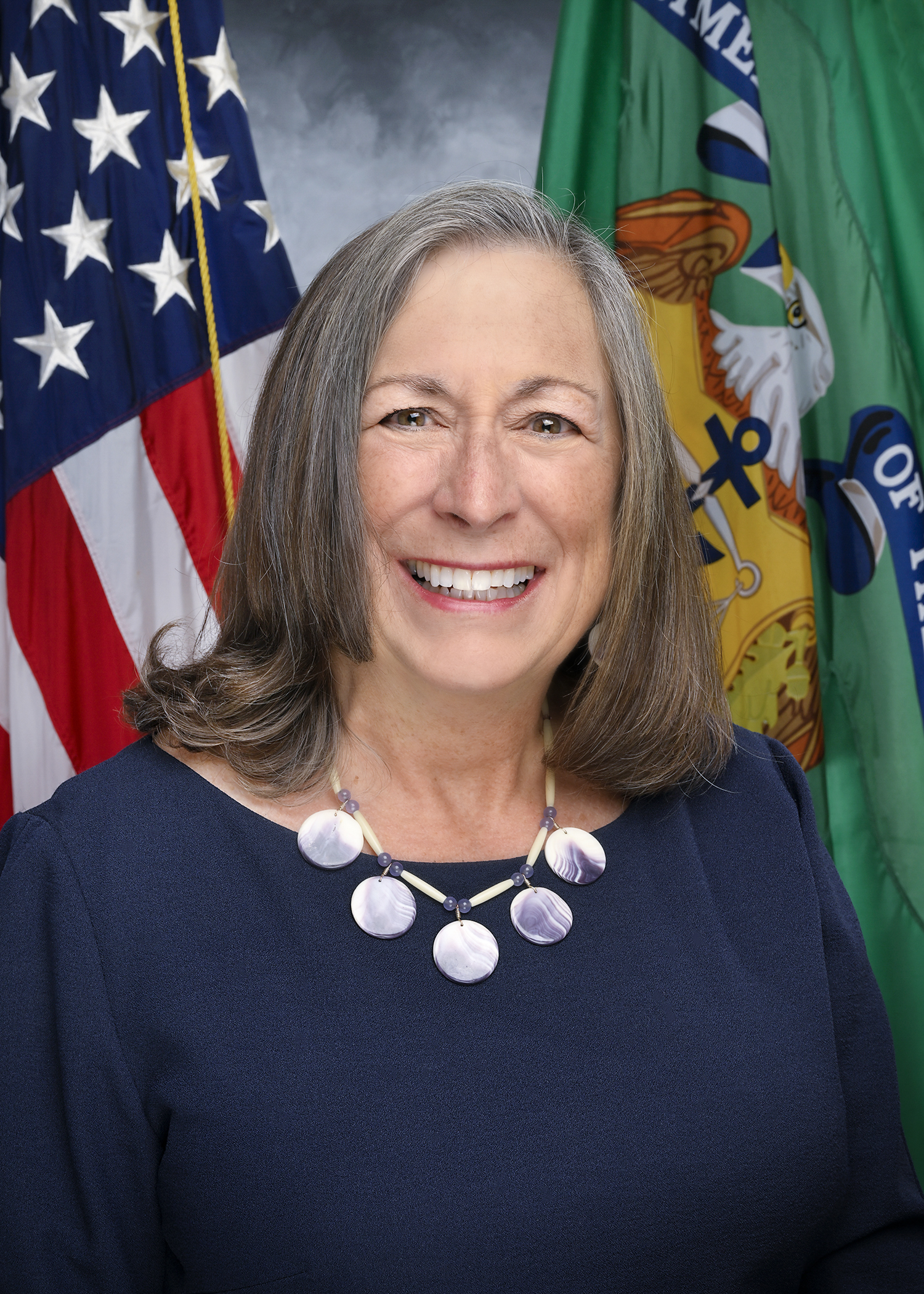
Lynn Malerba, chief of the Mohegan Tribe and the 45th treasurer of the United States

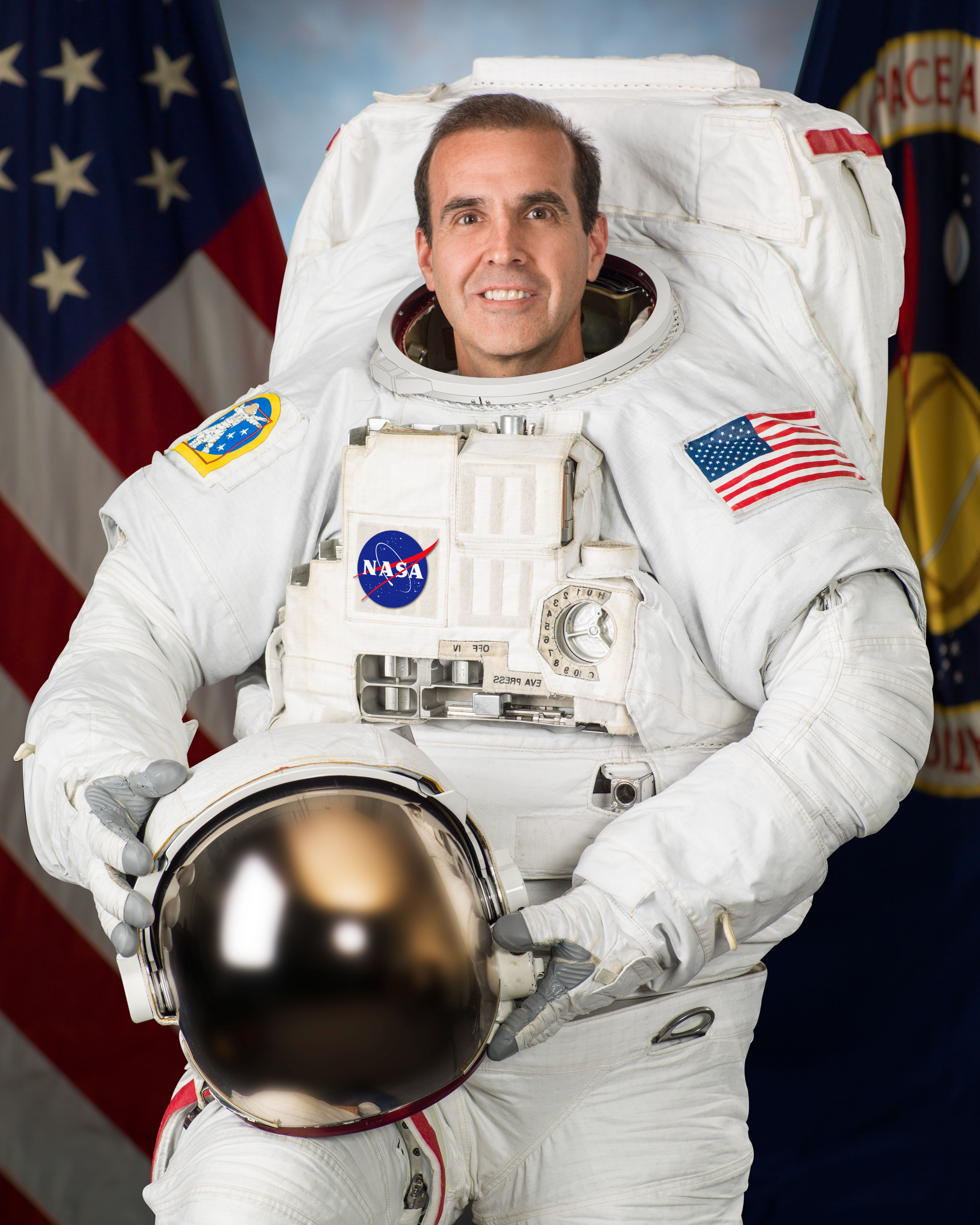
Rick Mastracchio, NASA astronaut

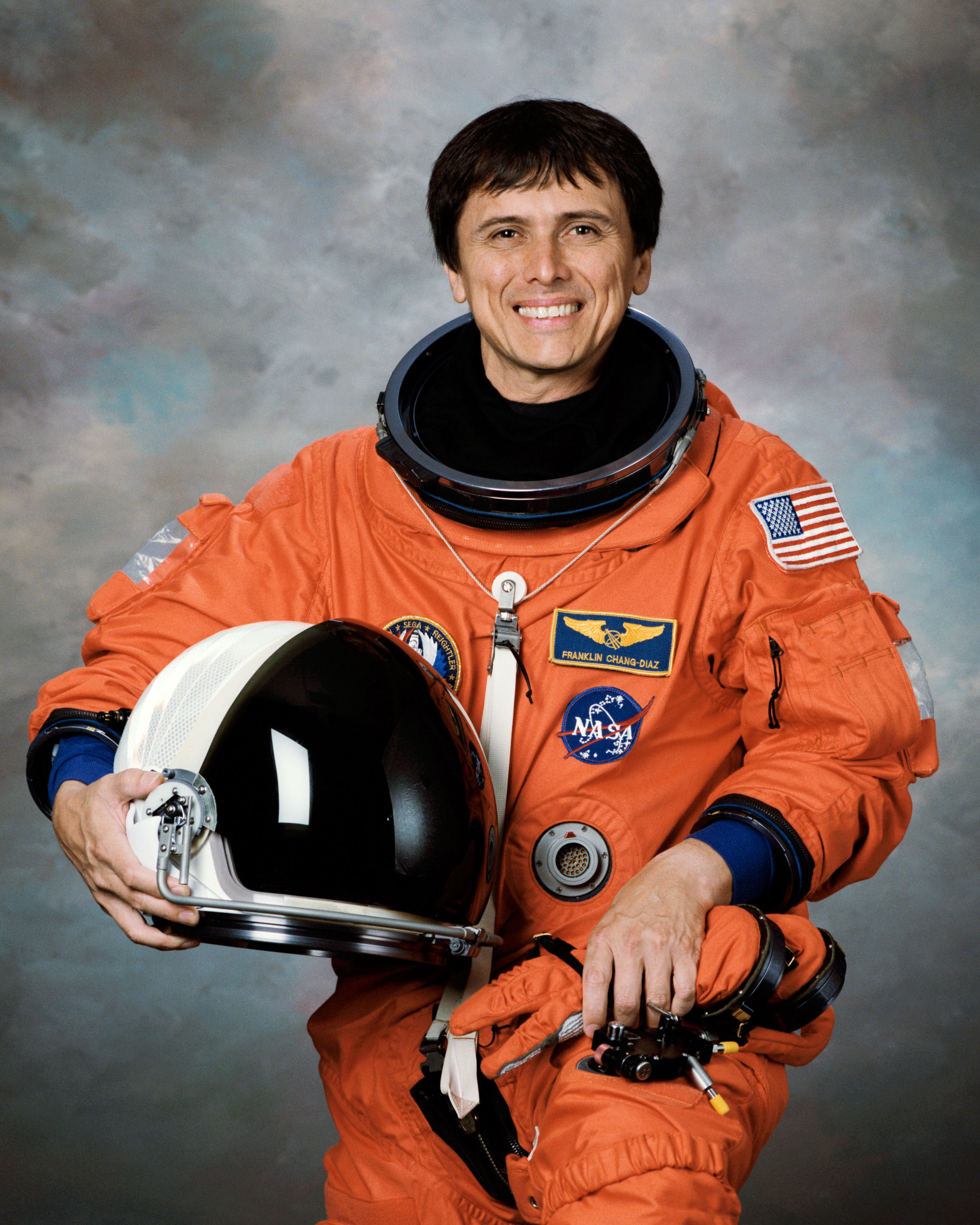
Franklin Chang-Díaz, NASA astronaut and founder of Ad Astra Rocket Company

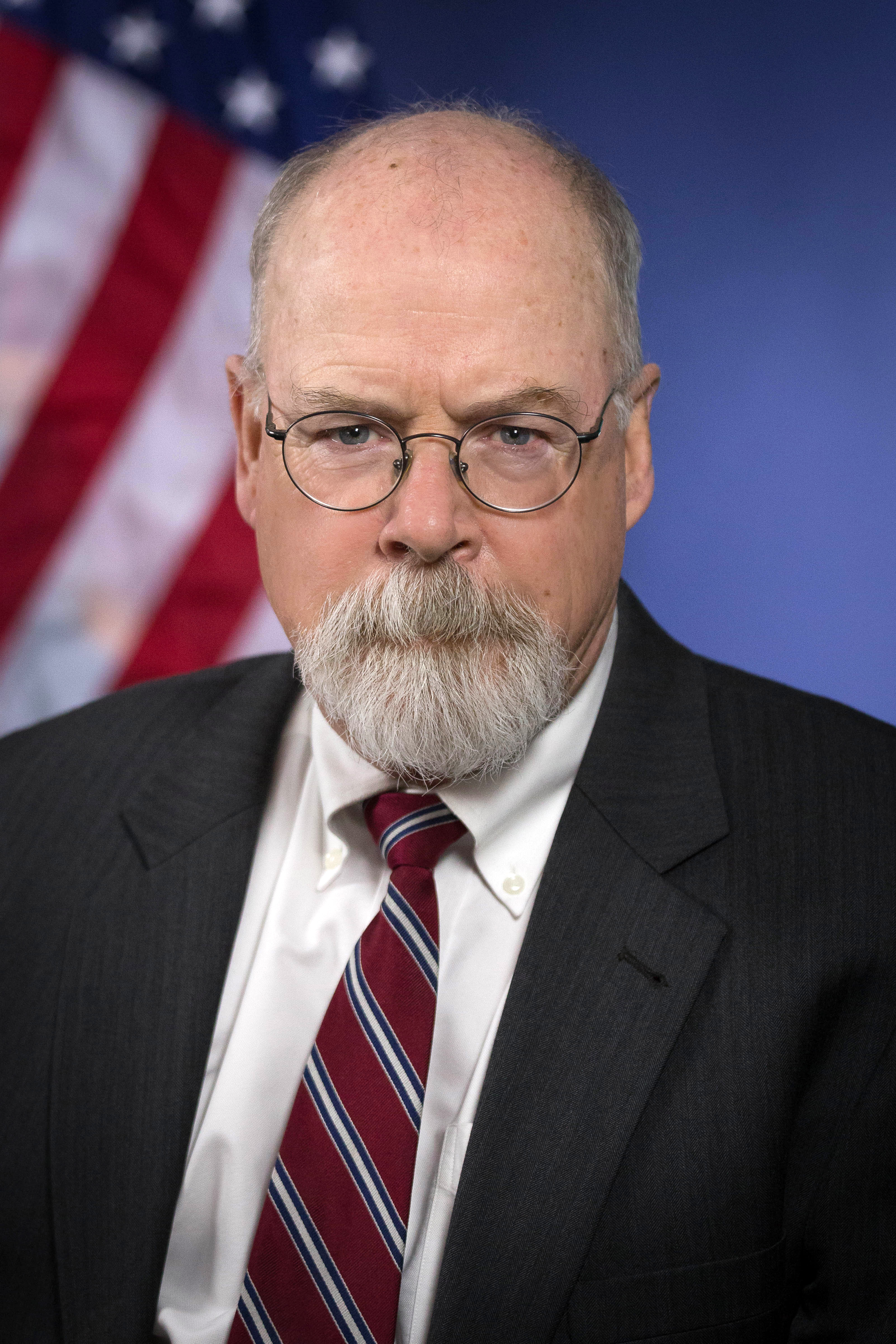
John Durham, former special counsel for the USDJ, former CT United States attorney

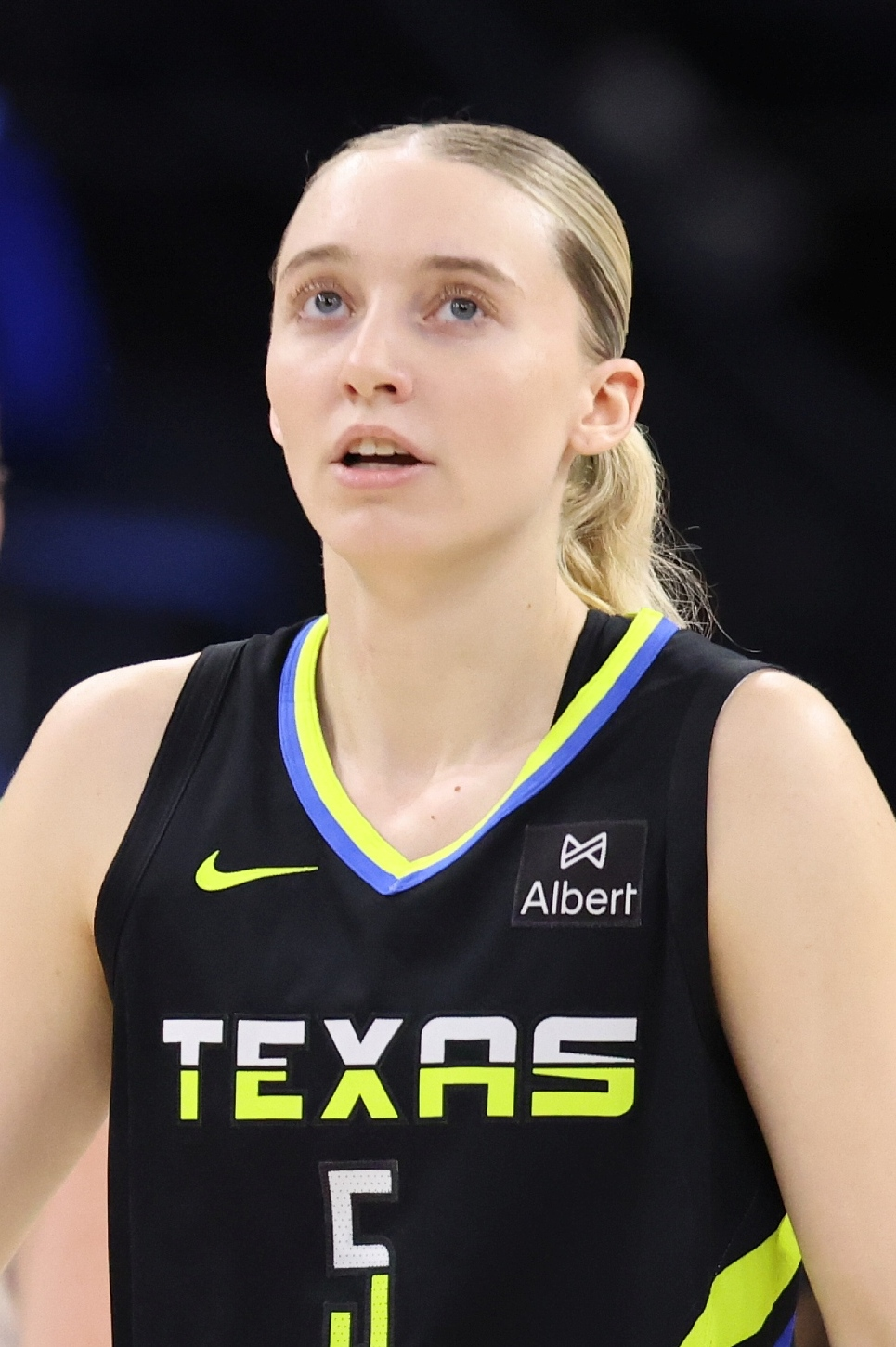
Paige Bueckers, professional basketball player, national high school player of the year

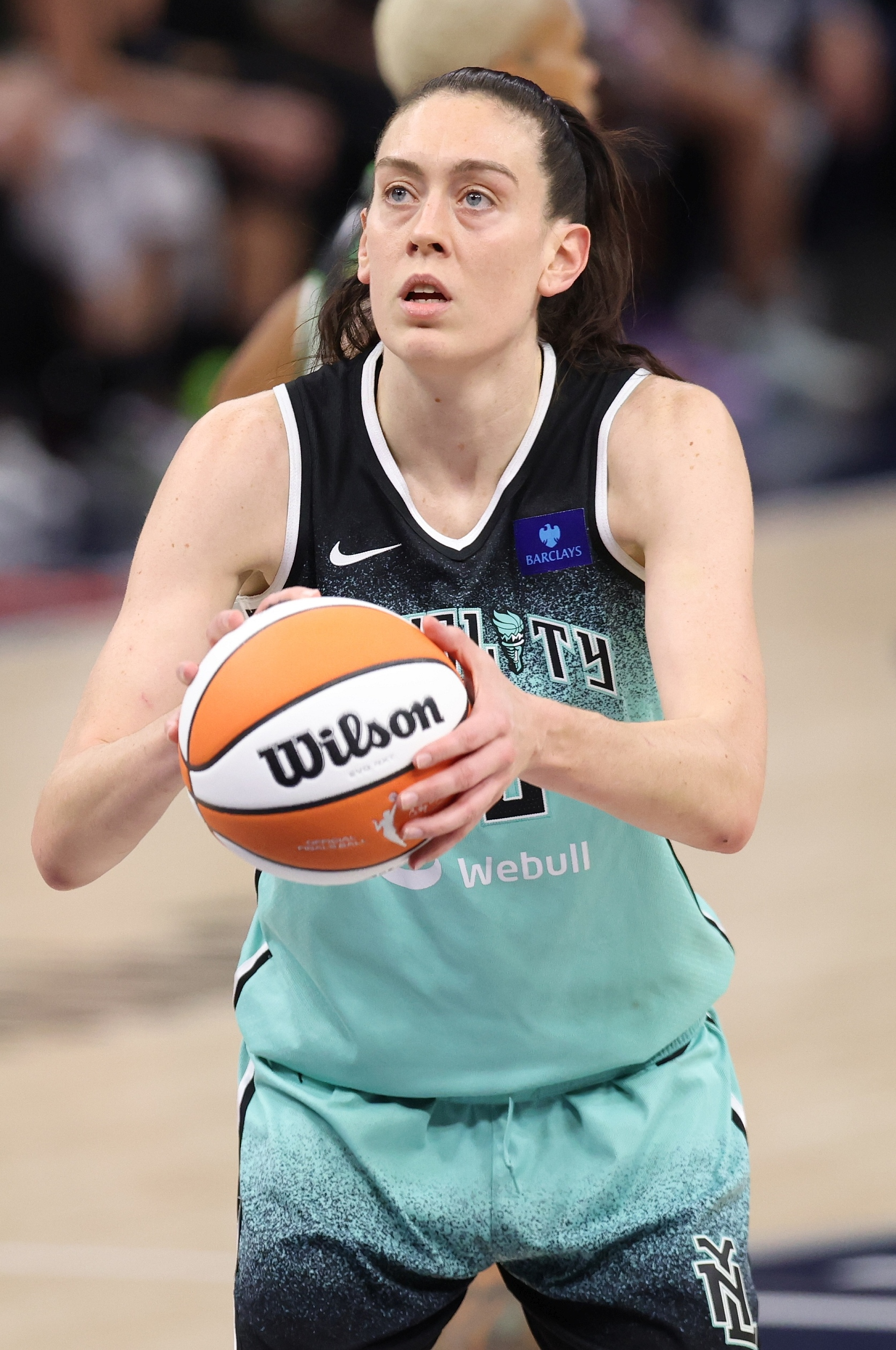
Breanna Stewart, professional basketball player, Olympic gold medalist

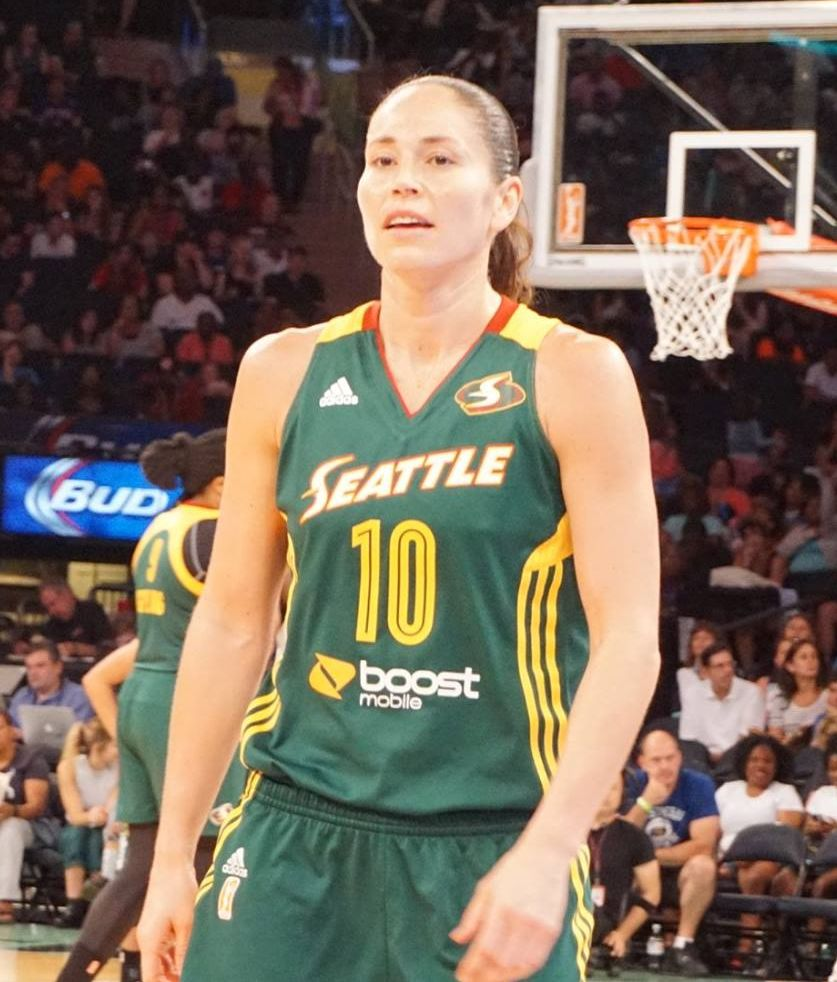
Sue Bird, former professional basketball player

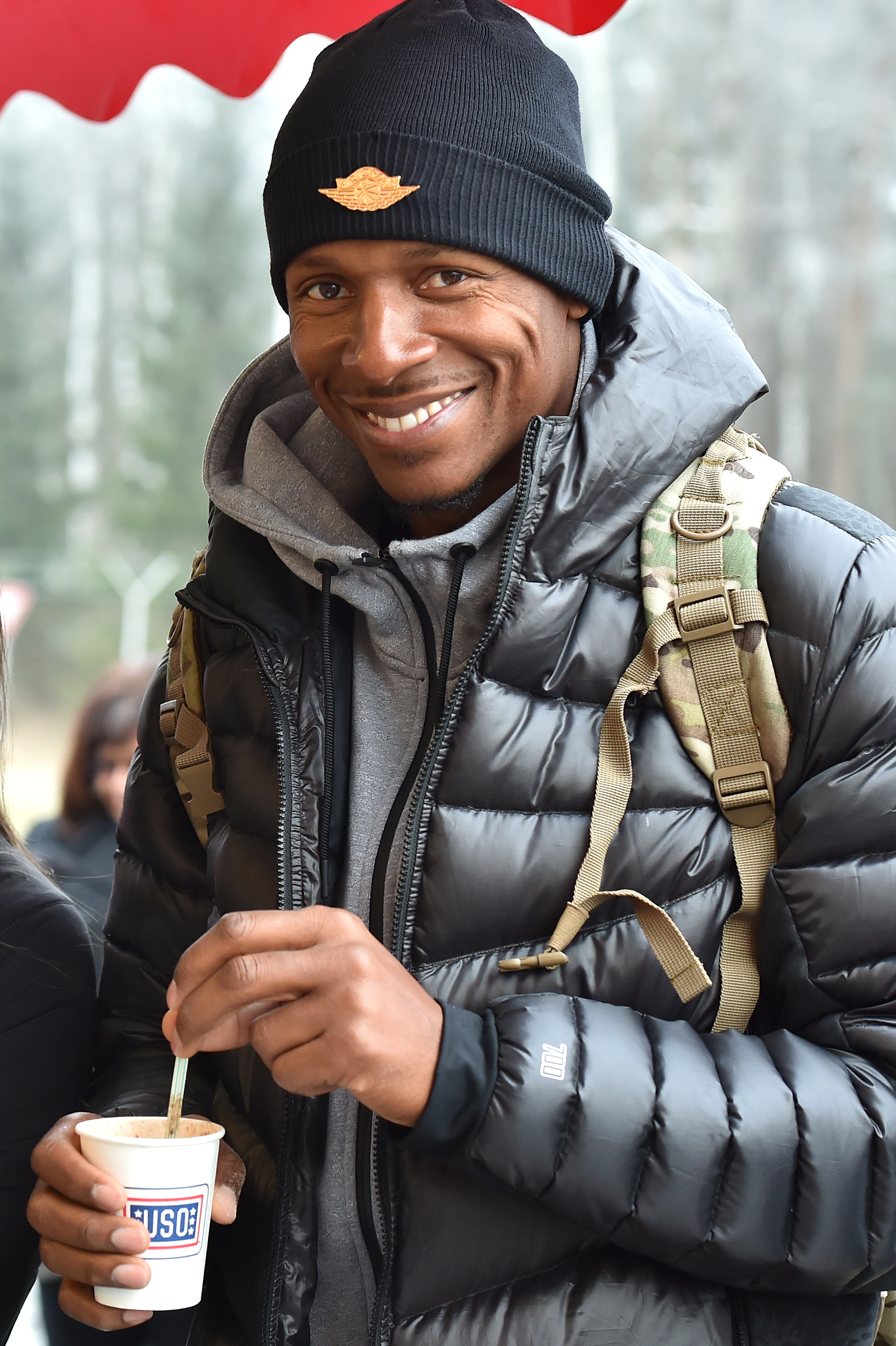
Ray Allen, former professional basketball player

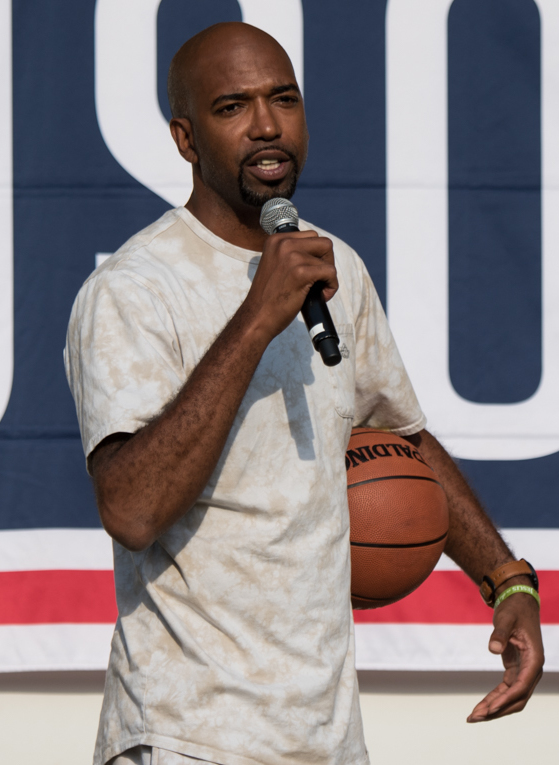
Richard Hamilton, former professional basketball player

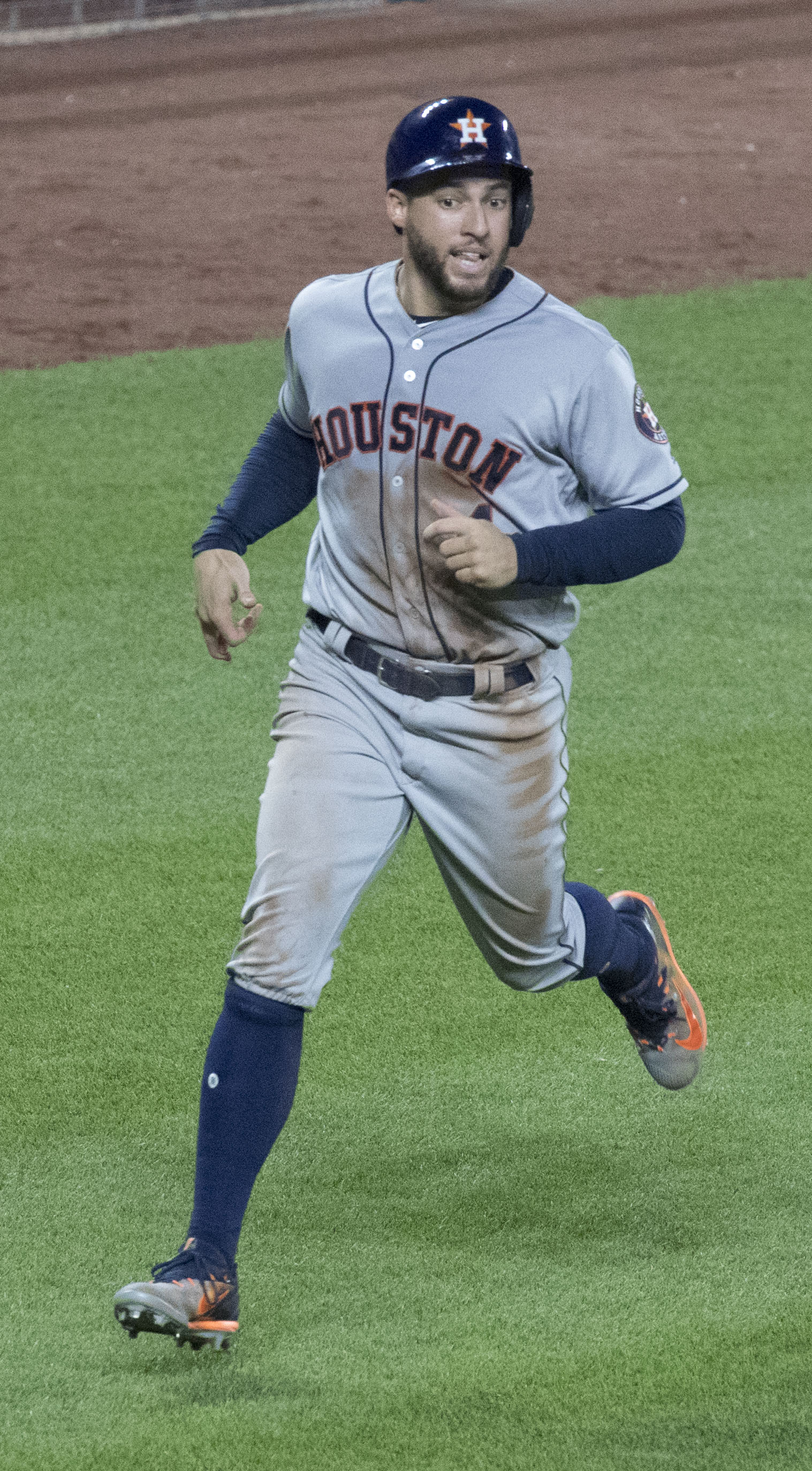
George Springer, professional baseball player

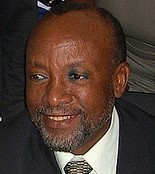
Nangolo Mbumba, 4th president of Namibia, 2nd vice president of Namibia

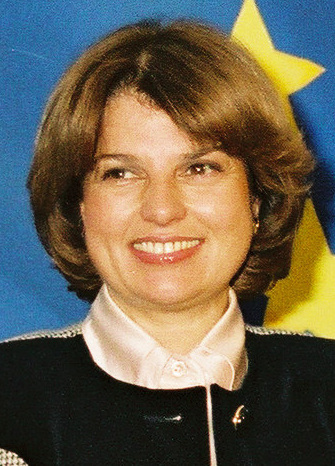
Tansu Çiller, 22nd prime minister of Turkey

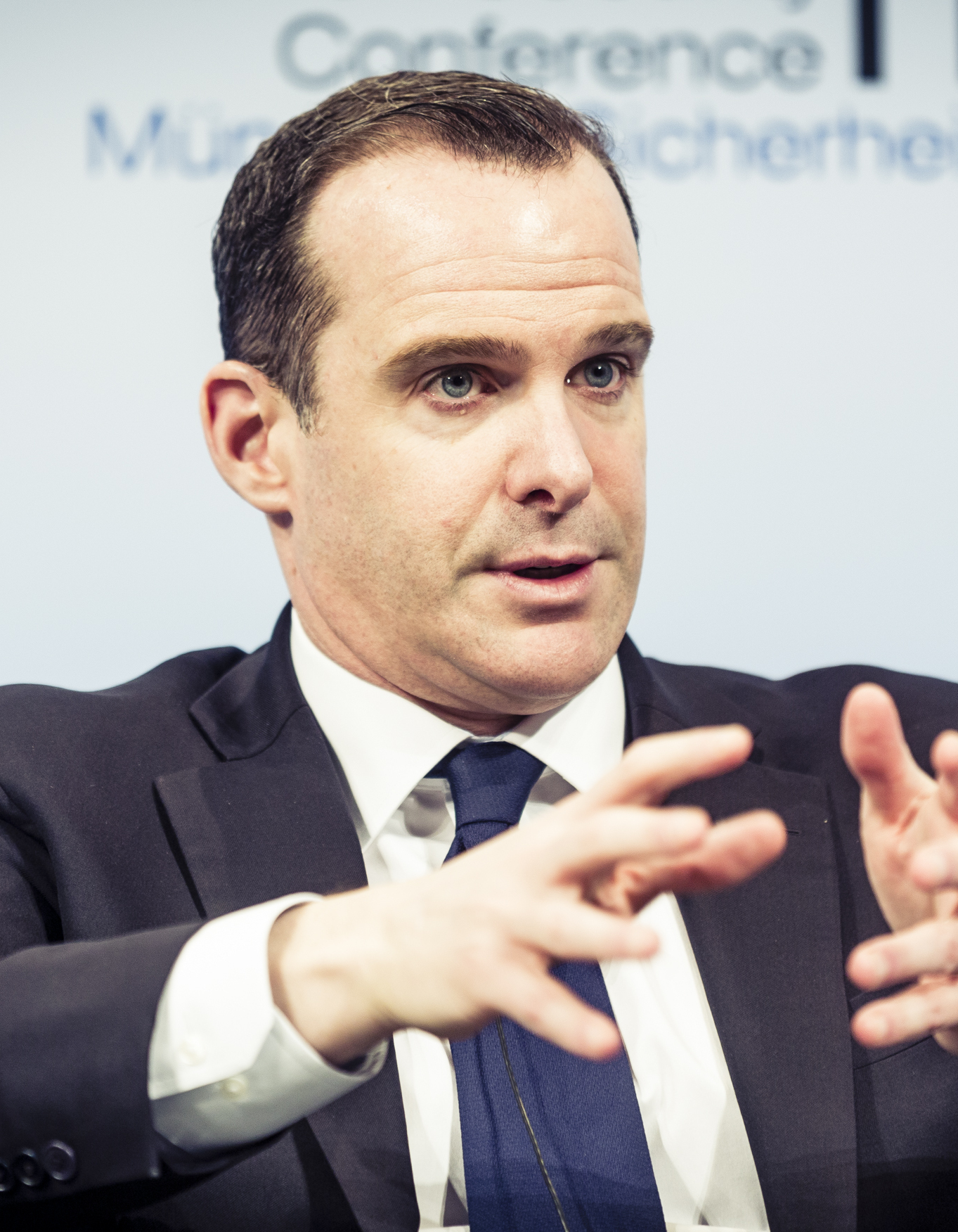
Brett McGurk, National Security Council coordinator for the Middle East and North Africa

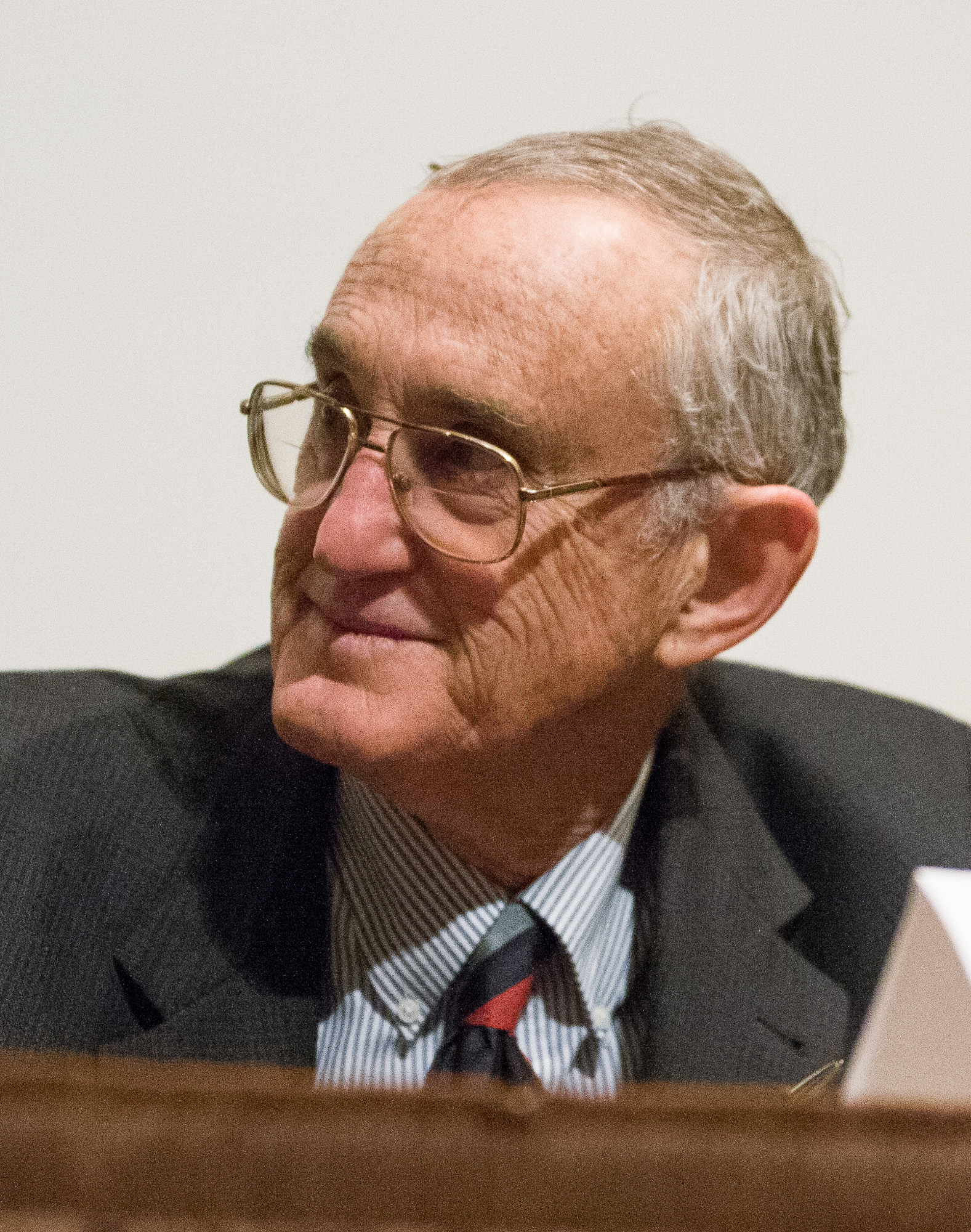
David Morris Lee, Nobel laureate

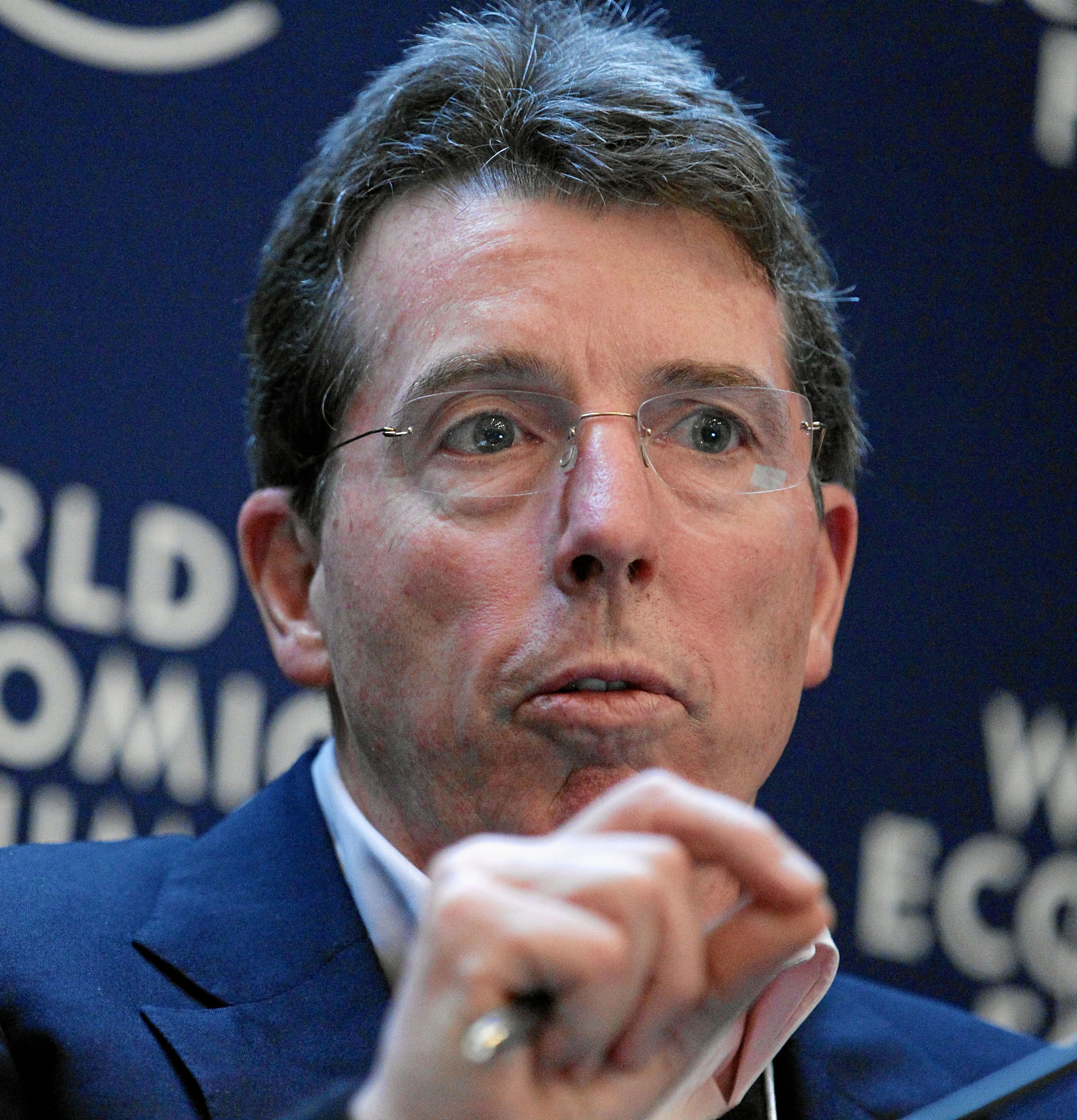
Bob Diamond, banker and former chief executive officer of Barclays

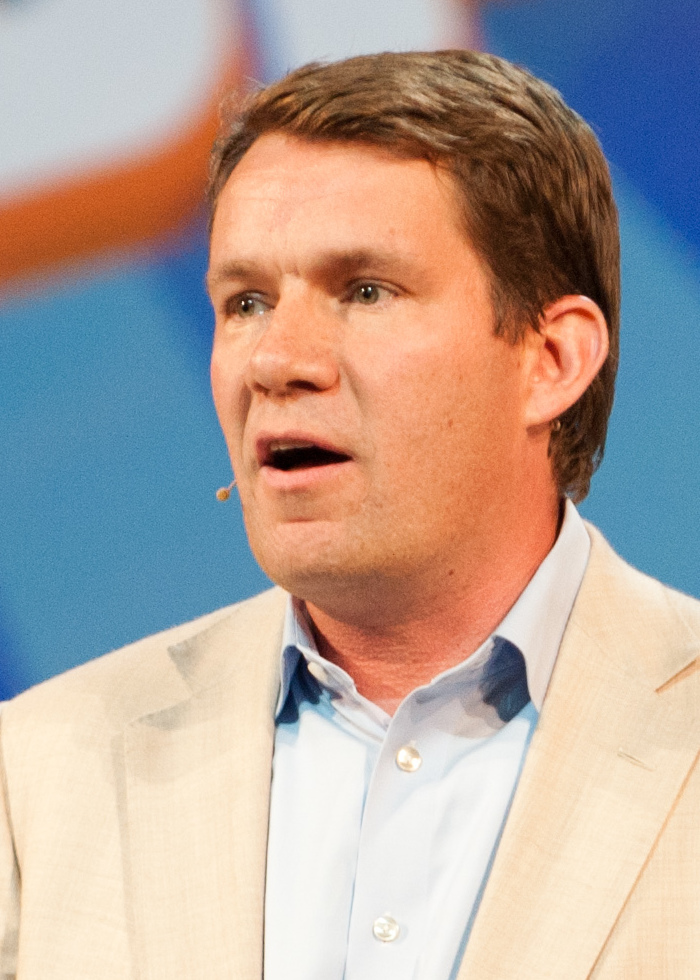
Scott Case, entrepreneur and founder of Priceline.com

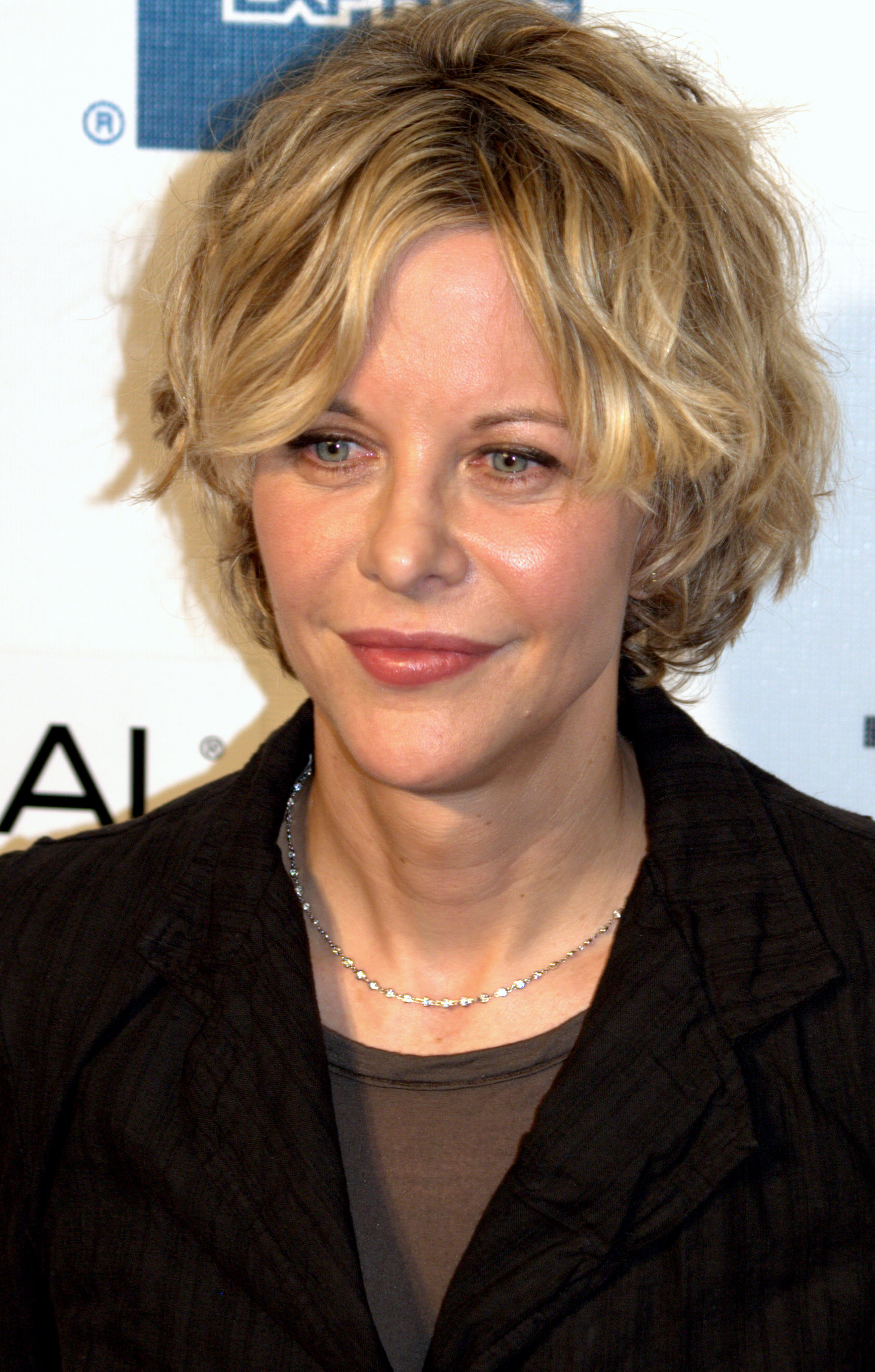
Meg Ryan, actress

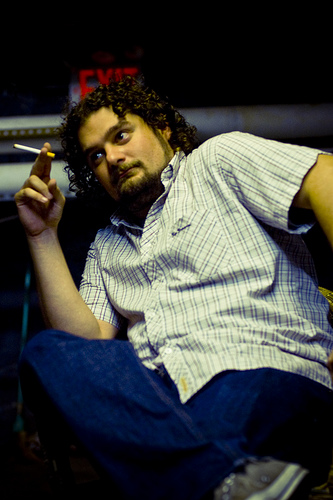
Bobby Moynihan, comedian

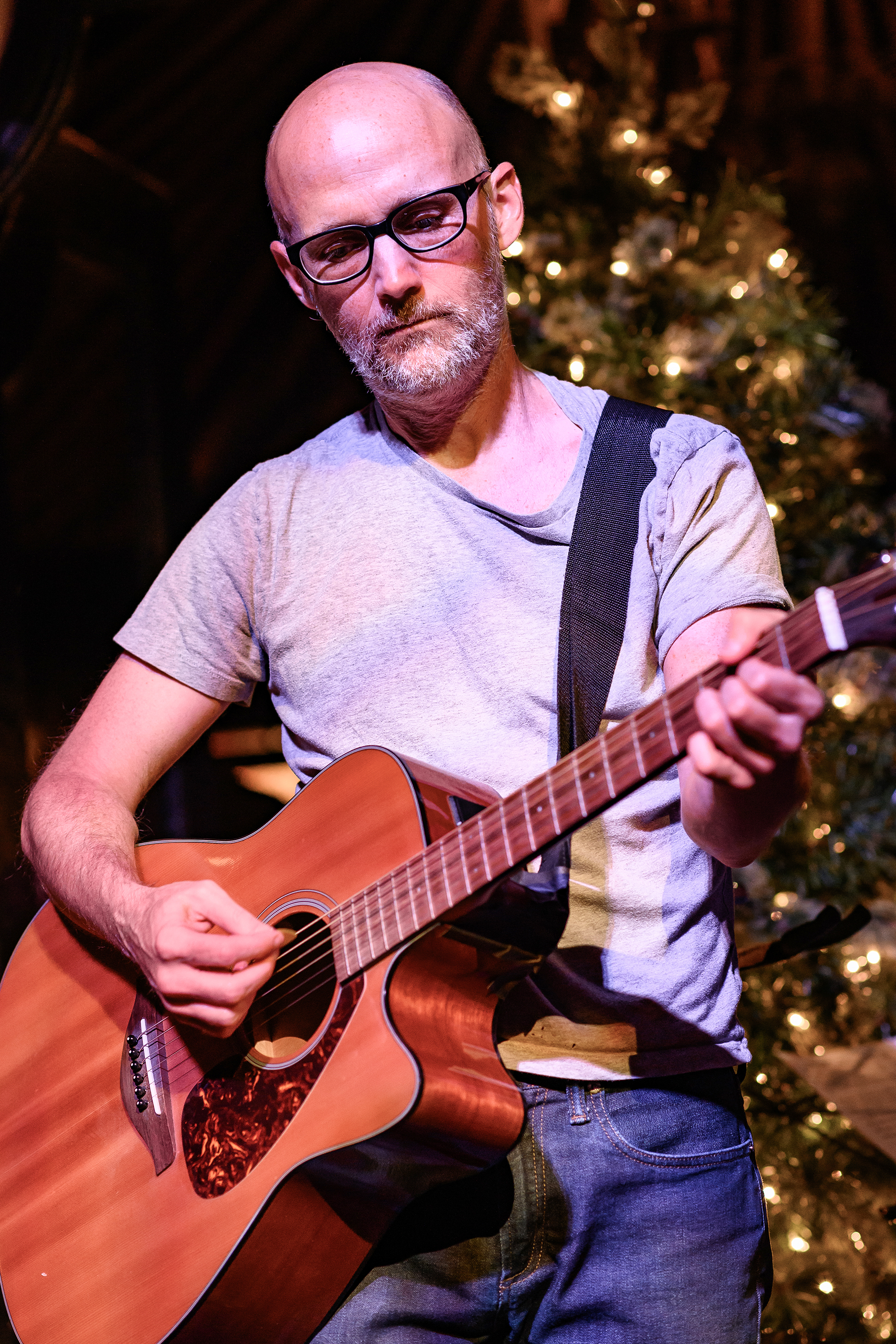
Moby, musician

== See also ==
- Long River Review, University of Connecticut's literary review magazine
- University of Connecticut Historic District, a historic district encompassing the historic core of the Storrs campus
- UConn Lumpy, a student-built airship, flown in 1975 at the Storrs soccer field
