= Alexey von Schlippe =

Russian-American painter

- Von Schlippe c. 1965
- Born: September 12, 1915; Moscow, Russia
- Died: July 22, 1988 (aged 72); Munich, Germany
- Known for: Painting

Alexey von Schlippe (1915–1988) was a Russian-American painter who became the first full-time professor at the University of Connecticut's Avery Point campus in Groton. Opened in 1992, the Alexey von Schlippe Gallery of Art is a contemporary art gallery in the Branford House.

== Biography ==
Von Schlippe was born in Bekasovo, Kaluga Oblast, Moscow, Russia, on September 12, 1915, to the family of a minister in Nicholas II's court. His father was Theodor (Fedor) Viktor Stanislaus von Schlippe (1873 – 1951), his mother was Elizabeth von Schwanebach (1875 – 1958), his grandfather was Woldemar (Vladimir) Rudolf August von Schlippe (1834 – 1923) and his great-grandfather was Karl von Schlippe (1798 – 1867). The family fled from the Russian Revolution in 1920 and eventually settled in Germany. Alexey attended the Berlin Academy of Arts and studied art and opera in Rome from 1940 to 1942. He married Xenia Pestmal in Dahlewitz near Berlin in 1942. The couple had a son, Peter, and a daughter, Catherine. The family was brought in an internment camp in Niederwangen, Wangen, Bavaria, shortly before the end of the war, because the members of the family were stateless persons. After the war the Von Schlippes settled in Brussels, where Alexey studied at the Brussels Art Institute.

In 1948, the family immigrated to the United States, first to La Crosse, Wisconsin, and then in 1954 to Connecticut. Von Schlippe renounced his title as a Russian nobleman and became a naturalized US citizen, along with his wife, in 1960. He taught painting, art history, and world civilization at Norwich Free Academy from 1955 to 1963. His wife taught German and Russian at the same school. He held a Master of Arts degree.

Von Schlippe became the first full-time professor at the University of Connecticut's Avery Point campus, serving from 1963 to 1982. He also taught at the university's campuses in Waterbury, Stamford, Hartford, and Storrs. When he died in Dießen am Ammersee, Germany, on July 22, 1988, he left a collection of 500 paintings in his campus office and stashed haphazardly in closets, which his estate permitted UConn to retain and put on exhibit.

Von Schlippe's paintings are predominantly large-scale representational works (figures, landscapes, and still lifes) that contain elements of abstraction and surrealism. They are composed on a variety of surfaces, including canvas, paper, and wood.

== Art gallery ==
David Madasci, a physics professor at Avery Point and friend of von Schlippe's, and Julia Pavone, at the time an adjunct art professor at UConn, founded the Alexey Von Schlippe Gallery of Art in 1992. Von Schlippe's 500 paintings formed the gallery's core collection, located on the second floor of the historic Branford House on 1084 Shennecosett Road in Groton. The gallery comprised four contiguous spaces and each year hosted six or more exhibits featuring regional, national, and international artists. Pavone served as curator-director until 2016, when UConn announced plans to close the gallery permanently and eliminate her position in response to state budget cuts. The decision encountered strong opposition from the region's residents and elected officials, who lobbied the university's board of trustees to reconsider the closure. The decision was subsequently walked back in part, and a part-time curator, Charlotte Gray, continues to operate the gallery. In 2019, the gallery hosted an exhibition featuring paintings, sculptures, photographs, and other artworks by local Electric Boat employees.
