= Turbulence (Foden novel) =

2009 novel by Giles Foden

- Author: Giles Foden
- Language: English
- Genre: Novel
- Publisher: Faber and Faber
- Publication date: 2009
- Publication place: United Kingdom
- Media type: Print (hardback and paperback)
- ISBN: 0-571-24807-1
- OCLC: 40981851

Turbulence: A Novel of the Atmosphere is a novel by journalist Giles Foden, published by Faber and Faber in 2009, focusing on meteorologists working on the preparations of Allied forces for D-day in the summer of 1944.

== Development and inspiration ==
Foden was inspired to write Turbulence by his father-in-law, the meteorologist Julian Hunt, who he describes as "one of the great theorists of turbulence". Hunt told him about Lewis Fry Richardson (who was the husband of Hunt's great aunt), a meteorologist, a physicist specialising in continuum mechanics, and a pioneer of peace studies. One of his most noted contributions to science was the invention of numerical weather forecasting. But though he was the greatest UK meteorologist of the wartime period, as a Quaker, he wouldn't allow his work to be used for the war effort. Foden became interested in the science of his work, but also in the D-Day forecast, what he called "the most important [weather] forecast, certainly of modern times, as it was absolutely crucial to the survival of Western Civilisation." In order to use Richardson in a story about D-Day, he created a fictionalised version of the meteorologist. In addition to fictionalised versions of real people and fictional characters, a number of real-life people also feature in the book.

Foden realised that although the weather forecasting for the Normandy landings was of critical importance for the campaign, it had not been fictionalised before (unlike the battles themselves). He also learned that the Americans, Norwegians and British were at loggerheads from the outset, which he thought had great dramatic potential. He wrote his protagonist as a "stumbling genius", as he felt this made for a more realistic character. Foden looked for inspiration at other examples of scientific novels, such as Arrowsmith by Sinclair Lewis, and the works of Jules Verne, and H. G. Wells, as well as the presence of the spiral shape of turbulence in literary history – in the works of Danté, Poe, Mallarmé, in Yeats' gyre and Conrad's typhoon.

== Plot summary ==
The novel's story is written as the memoir of a Cambridge-educated meteorologist, Henry Meadows, who in the 1980s is trying to sail a ship made from pykrete to Arabia (mirroring the efforts of Saudi Prince Mohammed bin Faisal Al Saud to tow an iceberg to his home country in the 1970s). His recollections form two parts, both during the Second World War. In the first part, Meadows is sent to Kilmun, in Argyll, Scotland to learn the secrets of a reclusive, pacifist meteorologist, Wallace Ryman (a fictionalised Lewis Fry Richardson). Wallace is pursuing peace studies in his remote fastness and does not want his calculations to aid the war effort. Meadows must extract the 'Ryman number' (mirroring the Richardson number) from the man, which will help the Allies predict the weather for the invasion of Normandy. In Scotland, he meets Geoffrey Pyke and Julius Breecher (based on Max Perutz), as well as Ryman and his wife. The second part of the novel is set in London and centres on the planning for the Normandy landings. There, the novel details the furious differences of opinion between meteorologists from America (Irving P. Krick and Ben Holzman), Norway (Sverre Petterssen), and Britain (Charles K.M. Douglas, Lawrence Hogben and James Stagg).

== Critical reception ==
Turbulence received broadly positive reviews in the UK, with slightly less favourable ones in the USA. Paul Watkins in The Times called the story 'compelling', and although he felt that Foden risked sacrificing the flow of the story to demonstrate the depth of his research, he concluded that ultimately the book would reward readers. Phil Baker in The Sunday Times gave the book a positive review, he enjoyed Foden's playful approach to interesting facts (and also remarked on how well researched the book was), but concluded that these allow Foden to address the central ideas in the book – human uncertainty, the poetic patterns of what happens and the strange poetry of science. The book was reviewed in The Guardian by Mark Lawson, who admired Foden's skill at the entertaining way he conveys his research. In conclusion, Lawson wrote that the novel was "compelling and affecting" and a smooth progression in Foden's literary career.

Professor John Sutherland in the Financial Times gave the book a positive review, calling it a "classy page-turner". He described the book as an excellent example of a literary niche we don’t yet have a name for – “Real-Science Fiction”. This niche is fiction that has been deeply researched, but the storytelling gives the reader an easily digested science lesson. Sutherland admired the way Foden weaves real-life characters into his story, as he had done so successfully in The Last King of Scotland and recommended the book for summer beach reading. The historian Antony Beevor recommended the book in the Daily Telegraph's Summer Choices, calling it "fascinating" Toby Clements in the Daily Telegraph enjoyed the book's close observation and comic timing, while querying whether Foden's comic voice was intentional or not. But despite its flaws, he found the novel fascinating and clever.

Writing in History Today, Simon Trew, a military historian specialising in the Normandy landings, gave the book a positive review, praising its historical research and saying it offers "a vivid and realistic insight into the tensions" between the scientists. Philip Ball gave the book a positive review in Nature. He admired the confidence of the discourses on turbulence and hydrodynamics that avoided the "Beginner's Guide" quality that non-science writers are liable to adopt, but also enjoyed the drama and (largely) believable characterisation too.

In the United States, Richard Eder, writing in the LA Times, thought that possibly Turbulence pursued too many themes to find a convincing link between them, but contained tense scenes of D-Day planning. Kirkus gave the book a positive review, admiring the book's blending of fact and fiction, scientific exposition, the way Foden built suspense and his depiction of the conflict between military officers and supporting meteorologists. Publisher's Weekly praised the book's well-sketched characters, the fusion of military history and science, but wondered if the accelerating plots threatened to crowd out the previously slower pace and large cast of characters. Steven Heighton in The New York Times Book Review enjoyed the protagonists' reminiscences of his childhood in Africa and found it contrasted unfavourably with the drab tone of the descriptions of wartime Britain. He also took issue with the characterisation of the narrator and found the central metaphor of turbulence heavy-handed. Heighton did, however, enjoy the book's faster second part, when, he wrote, the narrator's character and meteorological references come together pleasingly. In The New Yorker, the reviewer wrote that the meditative novel was struggled under the weight of its digressions, ending up as "disordered and unpredictable" as turbulence itself. Tim Gebhart for the Seattle Post-Intelligencer reckoned the book enjoyable.

== See also ==
Pressure – A 2026 film covering a similar topic
