= Pressure (2026 film) =

War drama film by Anthony Maras

- British cinematic release poster
- Directed by: Anthony Maras
- Screenplay by: David Haig; Anthony Maras
- Based on: Pressure by David Haig
- Produced by: Tim Bevan; Eric Fellner; Cass Marks; Lucas Webb
- Starring: Andrew Scott; Brendan Fraser; Kerry Condon; Chris Messina; Damian Lewis
- Cinematography: Jamie D. Ramsay
- Edited by: Anthony Maras
- Music by: Volker Bertelmann
- Production company: Working Title Films
- Distributed by: StudioCanal
- Release dates: 29 May 2026 (United States); 9 September 2026 (France); 11 September 2026 (United Kingdom)
- Running time: 100 minutes
- Countries: United Kingdom; France
- Language: English
- Budget: $30 million
- Box office: $31.2 million

Pressure is a 2026 war drama film directed and edited by Anthony Maras and written by Maras and David Haig, based on Haig's 2014 stage play. The film stars Andrew Scott as meteorologist James Stagg and Brendan Fraser as Dwight D. Eisenhower as the pair work to plan the Normandy landings during World War II, alongside Kerry Condon, Chris Messina, and Damian Lewis.

The film was released in the United States on 29 May 2026 and in the United Kingdom on 11 September 2026. It received generally positive reviews from critics.

== Plot ==
In 1944, at the height of the Second World War, the Allies prepare to invade German-occupied Europe under Operation Overlord. Under the supreme command of Gen. Dwight D. Eisenhower, the invasion is set to begin on 5 June (D-Day) with multiple amphibious landings in Normandy, France. Aware of the operation's complexity, and equally haunted by the deadly failure of the pre-D-Day rehearsal Exercise Tiger six weeks earlier, he is privately wary.

On 2 June, Eisenhower summons Scottish meteorologist Group Captain James Stagg to Southwick House, the seat of the Supreme Headquarters Allied Expeditionary Force (SHAEF) and requests him to provide a forecast favourable for Allied operations on D-Day, which is set to commence in the next 61 hours. Duly appointed as SHAEF's chief meteorological officer (Note: Stagg joined SHAEF in November 1943, seven months before D-Day.), Stagg leads the British-U.S. team tasked with providing the forecast, and is introduced to the bombastic Col. Irving P. Krick, who leads the U.S. section of the team.

Stagg's team immediately analyzes meteorological intelligence compiled from numerous weather stations to prepare a comprehensive forecast, and promptly predicts two low-pressure storms headed straight for the English Channel – indicating heavy rain, cloudy skies, low visibility and high waves, which could render the invasion unfeasible. Krick, who has relied more on "analogue forecasting" based on historical pattern readings, disputes this, arguing that previous forecasts for the area over several years have indicated calm weather.

On 3 June, Stagg attends SHAEF's morning conference and argues that Overlord's planned date of 5 June would be disastrous and recommends postponing it to 18 June; however, the meeting ends inconclusively when Gen. Bernard Montgomery warns that any delay could risk discovery by the Germans. Krick, barred by Stagg from attending, later meets with Eisenhower and presents his own findings, leading Eisenhower to furiously confront Stagg, who maintains his position while pointing out that Krick's previous successes were for battles in areas with easily predictable weather. The impasse persists well into the next day without any resolution; Eisenhower is ambivalent, but nevertheless seems to believe Krick. Concurrently, Stagg is informed that the hospital where his pregnant wife had been admitted was bombed, with her condition unknown; although devastated, he does not defer to Krick. Stagg is later comforted by Eisenhower's private secretary Kay Summersby, who urges Eisenhower not to be harsh on him.

On 4 June, both Stagg and Krick present their respective, and still contradictory, findings to SHAEF. Exasperated, Stagg points out the deficiencies in Krick's forecasting techniques, arguing that the Battle of Mont Sorrel of June 1916 — which Krick had purposely omitted from his presentation — had catastrophically inclement weather, and that nature cannot be factually ignored. Stagg again insists on postponing Overlord and states that the next feasible opportunity is 18 June, but an incredulous Montgomery rejects it. However, other SHAEF commanders, including Adm. Bertram Ramsay and ACM. Trafford Leigh-Mallory hesitate, noting they both cannot work under Stagg's scenario; Eisenhower finally relents, agreeing to a postponement. Later that morning, SHAEF attends Sunday service, and despite the initial sunshine, the storms finally arrive, vindicating Stagg but leaving Krick crestfallen.

Sometime later, Stagg gets a break when data recorded by Irish citizen observer Maureen Sweeney indicates a gap in the stormy weather, which Krick concurs with. In the early hours of 5 June, Stagg briefs Eisenhower and convinces him to launch the invasion on 6 June, which Eisenhower accepts. In private, Eisenhower prepares two public statements to be released contingent upon either the invasion's success or failure.

On 6 June, the revised D-Day, Eisenhower delivers a stirring radio address to the Allied forces, wishing them victory. Overlord begins with a combined seaborne-airborne thrust on Normandy, which catches the Germans unaware. Elsewhere, celebrations erupt at Southwick House when news of the invasion's success arrive via radio. His work complete, Stagg departs to look for his wife, and to his joy, finds that she and their newborn son have survived; the two tearfully embrace.

The film's closing credits reveal that the invasion's success enabled the Allies to defeat Germany within a year. Eisenhower, in a 1961 conversation with JFK on the way to the latter's inauguration as President, credits Overlord's success to the fact that the Allies "had better meteorologists than the Germans".

== Cast ==
- Andrew Scott as RAF Group Captain James Stagg, the Scottish chief meteorological officer at SHAEF.
- Brendan Fraser as U.S. Army General Dwight D. Eisenhower, the Supreme Commander of the Allied Expeditionary Forces and overall commander of Operation Overlord.
- Kerry Condon as MTC First Lieutenant Kay Summersby, Eisenhower's private secretary and confidante.
- Chris Messina as USAAF Lt Colonel Irving P. Krick, an American meteorologist who staunchly disagreed with Stagg.
- Damian Lewis as British Army General Sir Bernard Montgomery, the Commander-in-Chief of the 21st Army Group and overall Commander of Allied Ground Forces for the invasion.
- Con O'Neill as RAF Air Marshal Sir Trafford Leigh-Mallory, the Air Commander-in-Chief of the Allied Expeditionary Air Force (AEAF).
- Robert Portal as RN Admiral Sir Bertram Ramsay, the Naval Commander-in-Chief of the Expeditionary Force.
- Henry Ashton as John Eisenhower
- Tamsin Topolski as Liz Stagg, the pregnant wife of James Stagg.
- Jojo Macari as Andrew Carter
- Daniel Quinn-Toye as Michael Gregory, one of the numerous soldiers accidentally killed during Exercise Tiger
- Toby Williams as Bryant
- Max Croes as Private Eugene Shaw
- Roseanna Brown as lead Operator
- Wil Coban as Private Tommy Cooper

== Production ==
Pressure was directed by Australian director Anthony Maras, who co-wrote the script with David Haig and was also responsible for editing the film. It is adapted from Haig's stage play Pressure, which premiered in Edinburgh in 2014 and later moved to London's West End. It was produced by Eric Fellner, Tim Bevan, Cass Marks, and Lucas Webb through Working Title Films and financed by StudioCanal.

Andrew Scott was reported to be leading the cast in July 2024 as Group Captain James Stagg. The same month, Brendan Fraser was cast as Dwight D. Eisenhower. The following month, Kerry Condon joined the cast as Eisenhower's assistant Captain Kay Summersby. They were later joined in the cast by Damian Lewis and Chris Messina.

Principal photography began in the UK in September 2024, where all filming took place. Jamie D. Ramsay was responsible for cinematography. Filming locations included Mentmore Towers in Mentmore, Buckinghamshire.

Post-production took place in Adelaide Studios in Adelaide, South Australia. South Australian producers Rising Sun Pictures (VFX Producer Paul Aton), Artisan Post Group (led by Michael Darren), and Studio 508 (sound designers Duncan Campbell and Tom Heuzenroeder) contributed to the production. Volker Bertelmann composed the score.

== Release ==
In November 2024, Focus Features acquired North American distribution rights to the film, including distribution of the film through parent company Universal Pictures across Latin America, the Middle East, North Africa, and pan-Asia.

Pressure was theatrically released on 29 May 2026 in the US, and in the UK and Ireland on 11 September. It had its Australian premiere at the Adelaide Film Festival on 18 October in Maras's hometown, and is set to be released nationally in cinemas on 29 October 2026.

== Reception ==
=== Box office ===
In the United States and Canada, Pressure was released alongside Backrooms, The Breadwinner, and the wide expansion of Tuner and was projected to gross around $5 million from 1,829 theaters in its opening weekend. The film made $2.4 million on its first day, and went on to debut to $5.8 million, finishing in seventh.

=== Critical response ===
On the review aggregator website Rotten Tomatoes, 89% of 147 critics' reviews are positive, with an average rating of 7.6/10. The website's consensus reads: "Finding a fresh angle on one of the most dramatized days in military history, Pressure is a brainy war film that derives most of its thrills from Andrew Scott's simmering performance." Metacritic, which uses a weighted average, assigned the film a score of 69 out of 100, based on 36 critics, indicating "generally favorable" reviews. Audiences surveyed by CinemaScore gave the film an average grade of "A" on an A+ to F scale.

Wendy Ide, chief film critic of The Observer, called it "a gripping D-Day drama... solidly watchable stuff, elevated by top-tier acting talent", describing Scott's performance as "superb". Peter Bradshaw, writing in The Guardian, gave the film 3 out of 5 stars, concluding "It's a slick presentation and earnestly performed, with an important story to tell". Adam Smith of The Independent also gave it 3 out of 5 stars, praising Scott's performance, but calling it "a very special performance in a very ordinary film".

Donald Clarke of The Irish Times awarded 4 out of 5 stars to the film: "Scott is unimprovable as Stagg", and concluding "None of the film-making breaks new ground, but this is a tense, professionally made dad flick that will play handsomely on bank holiday afternoons forever". Robbie Collin, for The Telegraph, gave Pressure 4 out of 5 stars, calling Scott's performance "breathtaking", and the film a "tense, affecting Second World War chamber drama" Time Out also gave the film 4 out of 5 stars, writing "Scott is magnetic, drawing icy charisma from an introvert who is as implacable as a weather front", although "There are outsized performances galore, not all of them convincing".

== Historical accuracy ==
The movie contains several differences from the real story of the meteorologists working on Operation Overlord. While in the film Stagg is portrayed as joining the staff just days before the invasion, he had been running practice forecasts with analysts from the United States Army Air Forces since November 1943. Stagg's wife also gave birth to their son several months after D-Day, not immediately after.

While the movie depicts clear, sunny weather until a sudden storm arrives on 4 June, historical conditions had already begun to deteriorate by 3 June. While the movie depicts Maureen Sweeney's critically useful data, it was provided on June 3, and there is no historical mention of her being involved with the detection of a gap in-between the storms. Like in the movie, Eisenhower did postpone a decision until the morning of 4 June, but Stagg suggested a 24-hour postponement rather than a two-week delay: he never considered waiting until 18 June for the date of the invasion.

As in the stage play, the film omits the Norwegian Sverre Petterssen, the man who actually postponed D-Day. Petterssen was the meteorologist who was decisive in determining when the Allies could carry out D-Day. It was Petterssen's weather forecast that highlighted the gap between the two storm centres and indicated they had an opportunity on 6 June. The film's narrative centres on the British meteorologist James Stagg. In reality, he served as coordinator among three independent weather groups: the civilian British Met Office team with Charles K. M. Douglas, senior meteorologist, and Petterssen. The second group was the USAAF team with Krick and Ben Holtzman. The third group, not featured in the movie, was the Royal Navy team at Portsmouth with Commander Wolfe and Lieutenant Commander Lawrence Hogben. The three groups each prepared their own weather forecasts, which Stagg compiled and presented to the Allied high command. Stagg was not a meteorologist with much forecasting experience, and he did not have his own meteorological office to rely on. The American forecasting group thought that conditions would be calm. The two British groups said the weather was getting bad. It was crucial that Stagg listened more to them and less to the Americans that day. Douglas and Petterssen were the leading experts with the most experience in these forecasting groups. However, Pettersen was considerably more eloquent than Douglas, and more persistent. Many experts in Norway have spoken out against the film's presentation. The American Meteorological historian James Rodger Fleming also honoured Pettersen in a report.

== See also ==
- Turbulence, a 2009 novel covering a similar topic
