= Weather events during wars =

This is a list of weather events which occurred during wars and how those weather events affected the wars.

== 16th century ==
=== Sengoku period ===
- Siege of Katsurayama – The siege in 1557 was fought between the forces of the Japanese daimyō Takeda Shingen and Uesugi Kenshin as part of the Kawanakajima campaigns. Katsurayama castle was a strategically vital Uesugi stronghold in the contested Shinano Province and, when it was isolated from reinforcements due to late snow in early 1557, the Takeda clan used this opportunity to seize it under Baba Nobuharu, shielded from view by heavy snowfall.

=== Anglo-Spanish War (1585–1604) ===
- Spanish Armada – In 1588, the Spanish Empire created the Spanish Armada and set sail to invade the Kingdom of England. While the Spanish ships were anchored off the coast of France, the British set fire to eight ships, letting the wind and tide help set fire across the fleet. Soon after, the British launched an attack on the Spanish Armada during sea storms. These storms are attributed to the reason the British defeated the Spanish invasion.

== 17th century ==
=== First English Civil War ===
- Battle of Nantwich – In 1643 or 1644, Prince Rupert made an abortive attack on the Parliamentarian stronghold of Aylesbury England. 500 men are reported to have frozen to death on 21 January. On 25 January a sudden thaw caused a bridge to collapse over the River Weaver, splitting Royalist cavalry forces at the Battle of Nantwich resulting in their defeat.

== 18th century ==
=== Great Northern War ===
- Swedish invasion of Russia – In the Great Northern War, Charles XII of Sweden invaded the Russian Empire, crossing the Vistula on 1 January 1708. The Russians retreated, adopting a scorched-earth policy. The winter of 1708–1709 was the most brutal of the 18th century, so severe that the seaport of Venice froze during the Great Frost of 1709. Charles' 35,000 troops were crippled, and by the spring of 1709 only 19,000 were left. The Battle of Poltava in the Ukrainian Cossack Hetmanate in late June 1709 sealed the end of the Swedish Empire.

=== American Revolutionary War ===
- George Washington's crossing of the Delaware River – On December 25, 1776, George Washington and the Continental Army crossed the icy Delaware River. During the crossing, the weather became progressively worse, turning from drizzle to rain and then to sleet and snow. "It blew a hurricane," one soldier recalled.
- Battle of Long Island – During the battle, the British trapped and laid siege to George Washington and the United States' Continental Army with their army and the East River. Instead of directly attacking the Continental Army, the British began digging trenches. On the afternoon of August 28, 1776, rain fell, which concealed the Continental Army cannons, which attacked the British forces. Over the next day, the Continental Army planned on how to evacuate across the East River to escape the British siege. During the night on August 30, a dense fog set across the river, which allowed the entire Continental Army's 9,000 troops to cross the river with no casualties.
- Battle of Monmouth Court House – During the battle, most of the casualties occurred from heat-related illnesses.
- Battle of Rhode Island – A French naval force under Admiral Charles Henri Hector d'Estaing was sent to assist Washington; deciding New York was too formidable a target, in August they launched a combined attack on Newport, with General John Sullivan commanding land forces. The resulting Battle of Rhode Island was indecisive; badly damaged by a storm, the French withdrew to avoid putting their ships at risk. Further activity was limited to British raids on Chestnut Neck and Little Egg Harbor in October.

== 19th century ==
=== Napoleonic Wars ===
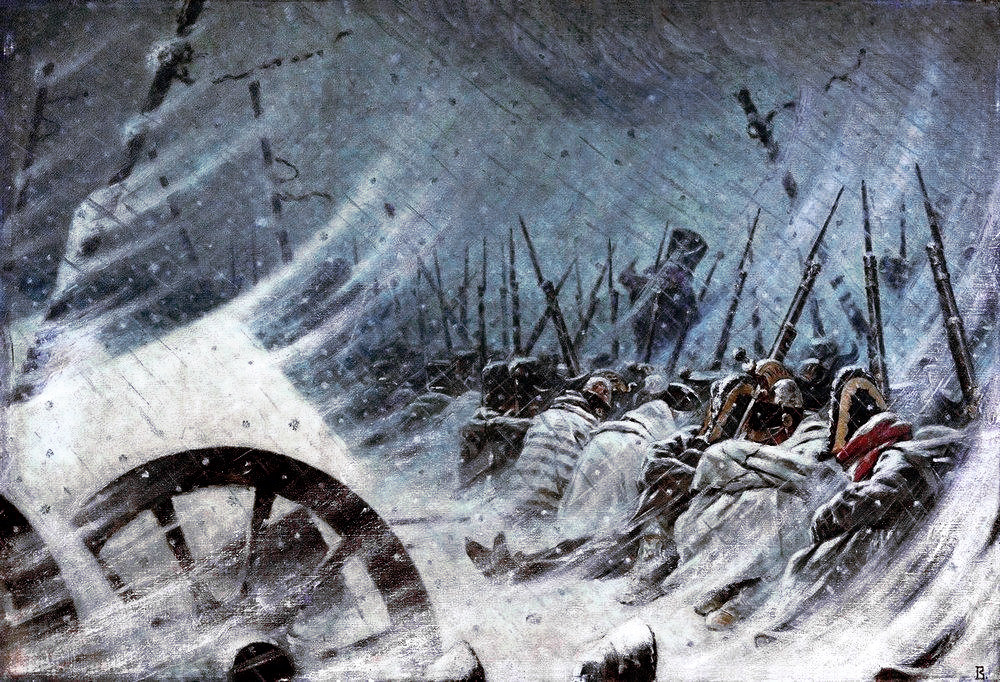
The Night Bivouac of Napoleon's Army during retreat from Russia in 1812.

- French invasion of Russia – Napoleon's Grande Armée of 610,000 men invaded Russia, heading through territory of today's Belarus towards Moscow, in the beginning of summer on 24 June 1812. The Russian army retreated before the French and again burnt their crops and villages, denying the enemy their use. Napoleon's army was ultimately reduced to 100,000. His army suffered further, even more disastrous losses on the retreat from Moscow, which started in October. Multiple sources concur that winter and its aftermath was only a contributing factor to Napoleon's defeat and retreat.

=== War of 1812 ===
- Burning of Washington – Following the United Kingdom's capture of Washington, D.C., the capital of the United States, a sudden, very heavy thunderstorm—possibly a hurricane—put out the fires started by the British. It also spun off a tornado that passed through the center of the capital, setting down on Constitution Avenue and lifting two cannons before dropping them several yards away and killing British troops and American civilians alike. Following the storm, the British troops returned to their ships, many of which were badly damaged. There is some debate regarding the effect of this storm on the occupation. While some assert that the storm forced the British to retreat, historians have argued that their intention was only to destroy the city's government buildings, rather than occupy it for an extended period. The British occupation of Washington lasted only about 26 hours. Despite this, the "Storm that saved Washington", as it became known, did the opposite according to some. The rains sizzled and cracked the already charred walls of the White House and ripped away at structures the British had no plans to destroy (such as the Patent Office).

=== American Civil War ===
- Burnside's Mud March – During the march, the weather deteriorated, with a strong storm producing cold temperatures, strong wind and heavy precipitation.
- Battle of Spotsylvania Courthouse – During the battle from May 11th-13th a heavy rain fell on the battlefield, which assisted Union assaults on the "Mule Shoe” and during the 24 hours of combat gun powder would become wet and unusable and the Union and Confederate soldiers alike had to fight hand to hand. It is believed some of the most savage fighting of the American Civil War took place here, now known as the Bloody Angle.

== 20th century ==
=== World War II ===
- Nazi occupation of Poland – A strong F2 tornado struck the village of Borzymy, killing a farmer who was thrown 3 kilometres (1.9 mi) away. The exact date of the tornado is unknown, but modern meteorologists with the European Severe Storms Laboratory believe it occurred 21 July 1940 in occupied Poland.
- Operation Barbarossa – During World War II, the Wehrmacht lacked necessary supplies, such as winter uniforms, due to the many delays in the German army's movements. At the same time, Hitler's plans for the 1941 invasion of the Soviet Union, Operation Barbarossa, actually miscarried before the onset of severe winter weather. Neither Hitler nor the General Staff anticipated a long campaign lasting into the winter. Thus, they failed to make adequate preparations for a possible winter campaign, such as the distribution of warm clothing and winterization of vehicles and lubricants. In fact his eastern army suffered more than 734,000 casualties (about 23% of its average strength of 3,200,000) during the first five months of the invasion before the winter started in recently occupied Poland and Soviet Belarus, Ukraine, and western Russia. On 27 November 1941, Eduard Wagner, the Quartermaster General of the German Army, reported that "We are at the end of our resources in both personnel and material. We are about to be confronted with the dangers of deep winter." Also of note is the fact that the unusually early winter of 1941 cut short the rasputitsa season, improving logistics in early November, with the weather still being only mildly cold.
- Battle of the Atlantic / North Atlantic weather war – In October 1943, Nazi Germany established Weather Station Kurt, in Labrador, Dominion of Newfoundland, marking the only known armed German military operation on land in North America during the Second World War. Weather Station Kurt was established by U-537, commanded by Kapitänleutnant Peter Schrewe, who carried WFL-26, codenamed "Kurt", a meteorologist, Dr. Kurt Sommermeyer, and his assistant, Walter Hildebrant. En route, the U-boat was caught in a storm and a large breaker produced significant damage, including leaks in the hull and the loss of the submarine's quadruple anti-aircraft cannon, leaving it both unable to dive and defenceless against Allied aircraft. The weather station functioned for only a few days before its signals became degraded and within three weeks it permanently failed. The U-boat undertook a combat patrol in the area of the Grand Banks of Newfoundland, during which she survived three attacks by Canadian aircraft, but sank no ships.

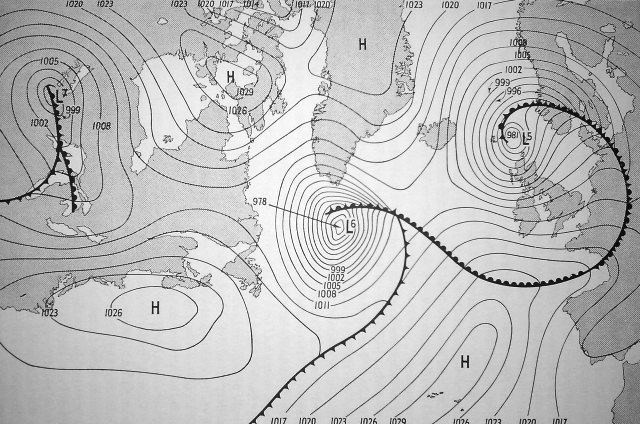
The weather on 5 June 1944, the day before D-Day

- D-Day – See also: Weather forecasting for Operation Overlord – Eisenhower had tentatively selected 5 June as the date for the assault. However, on 4 June, conditions were unsuitable for a landing: high winds and heavy seas made it impossible to launch landing craft, and low clouds would prevent aircraft from finding their targets. The weather forecast that reported the storms was sent from a weather station on the western coast of Ireland. Group Captain James Stagg of the Royal Air Force (RAF) met Eisenhower on the evening of 4 June. He and his meteorological team predicted that the weather would improve enough for the invasion to proceed on 6 June. The next available dates with the required tidal conditions (but without the desirable full moon) would be two weeks later, from 18 to 20 June. Postponement of the invasion would have required recalling men and ships already in position to cross the English Channel and would have increased the chance that the invasion plans would be detected. After much discussion with the other senior commanders, Eisenhower decided that the invasion should go ahead on 6 June. A major storm battered the Normandy coast from 19 to 22 June, which would have made the beach landings impossible. Allied control of the Atlantic meant German meteorologists had less information than the Allies on incoming weather patterns. As the Luftwaffe meteorological centre in Paris was predicting two weeks of stormy weather, many Wehrmacht commanders left their posts to attend war games in Rennes, and men in many units were given leave. Field Marshal Erwin Rommel returned to Germany for his wife's birthday and to petition Hitler for additional Panzer divisions.
- Sinking of the SS Oria – The ship was hit by a severe windstorm, which capsized and sank the steamer. At least 4,102 people were killed, which included 4,000 Italian prisoners (43 officers, 118 non-commissioned officers and 3,955 enlisted men), 60 German soldiers to guard the Italian prisoners, and 54 Greeks.
- Typhoon Cobra – A powerful tropical cyclone struck the United States Pacific Fleet in December 1944. The storm sank three destroyers, killed 790 sailors, damaged nine other warships, and swept dozens of aircraft overboard off their aircraft carriers.
- Battle of the Bulge – The Germans achieved a total surprise attack on the morning of 16 December 1944, due to a combination of Allied overconfidence, preoccupation with Allied offensive plans elsewhere and poor aerial reconnaissance due to bad weather. American forces were using this region primarily as a rest area for the U.S. First Army, and the lines were thinly held by fatigued troops and inexperienced replacement units. The Germans also took advantage of heavily overcast weather conditions that grounded the Allies' superior air forces for an extended period. Improved weather conditions from around 24 December permitted air attacks on German forces and supply lines. On 26 December the lead element of Patton's U.S. Third Army reached Bastogne from the south ending the siege.
- Atomic bombings of Hiroshima and Nagasaki – Following the atomic bombing of Hiroshima on August 6, 1945, the United States was preparing to drop another atomic bomb on the Empire of Japan. The second atomic bomb, codenamed Fat Man, was set to be dropped on the Japanese town of Kokura. On the morning of August 9, 1945, Major Charles Sweeney was ordered to drop the bomb using only visual targeting and not with any radar capabilities. Due to nearby firebombings, visibility was low over Kokura. After circling the city for 50 minutes, Sweeney abandoned the city and flew to the secondary target of Nagasaki. Coincidentally, Tetsuya Theodore “Ted” Fujita was a resident of and in Kokura the morning of August 9, 1945. Fujita went on as a meteorologist to create the Fujita scale used to rank tornadoes and Fujita studied the damage caused by the nuclear explosions, which contributed to his understanding of downbursts and microbursts as "starbursts" of wind hitting the Earth's surface and spreading out.

== 21st century ==
=== War in Afghanistan (2001–2021) ===
- United States invasion of Afghanistan – In October 2001, just before the United States began their invasion of Afghanistan, three U.S. Air Force meteorologists were secretly deployed into the remote mountains of South Asia, with the tasks of collecting and transmitting weather data. The first weather report from these meteorologists were read by the U.S. commanding officers before the invasion began. Over the course of the invasion and subsequent war, “tens of thousands of weather forecasts” were taken and dispatched by military meteorologists.
- On April 6, 2005, a United States CH-47 Chinook helicopter crashed in a sandstorm near Ghazni, killing all aboard (14 American soldiers, 1 marine and 3 civilian contractors).

=== 2003 invasion of Iraq ===
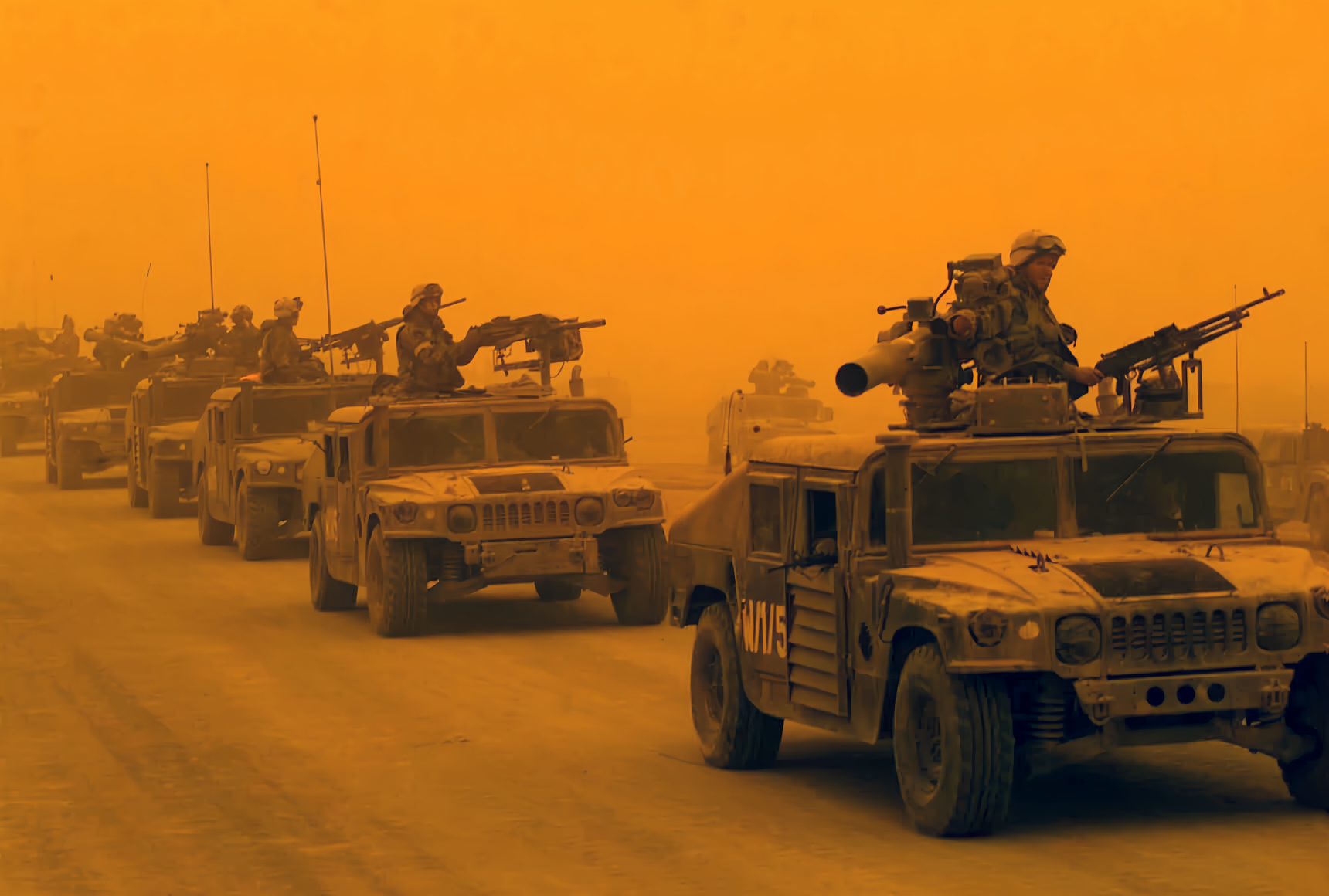
American convoy of Humvees in northern Iraq during a sandstorm amid the 2003 invasion of Iraq

- Battle of Nasiriyah – By 28 March, a severe sandstorm slowed the coalition advance as the 3rd Infantry Division halted its northward drive halfway between Najaf and Karbala. Air operations by helicopters, poised to bring reinforcements from the 101st Airborne, were blocked for three days. There was particularly heavy fighting in and around the bridge near the town of Kufl.

=== Russo-Ukrainian War ===
- Russian invasion of Ukraine – During the Russian invasion of Ukraine in 2022, a tornado outbreak affected both Russia and Ukraine. During the winter months of the invasion, Russian forces targeted Ukrainian electrical infrastructure, which was widely described as Russia "weaponizing the Ukrainian winter" to degrade civilian morale.

== See also ==
- Military meteorology
- Cold-weather warfare

== Bibliography ==
- Beevor, Antony (2009). D-day: the Battle for Normandy. London: Viking (Penguin). ISBN 978-0-670-88703-3.
- Ford, Ken; Zaloga, Steven J. (2009). Overlord: The D-Day Landings. Oxford; New York: Osprey. ISBN 978-1-84603-424-4.
- Traub, Alex (2 January 2024). "Maureen Flavin Sweeney Dies at 100; Her Weather Report Delayed D-Day". New York Times.
- Whitmarsh, Andrew (2009). D-Day in Photographs. Stroud: History Press. ISBN 978-0-7524-5095-7.
- Wilmot, Chester (1997) [1952]. The Struggle For Europe. Ware, Hertfordshire: Wordsworth Editions. ISBN 1-85326-677-9.
