= North Atlantic weather war =

Conflicts over the control of meteorological data during the Second World War

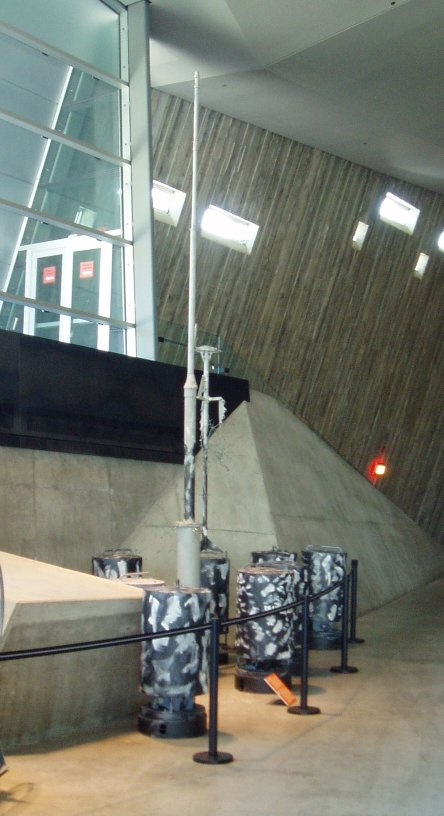
Weather Station Kurt, a German automated weather station. (shown here at the Canadian War Museum in 2007)

The North Atlantic weather war occurred during World War II. The Allies and the Axis tried to gain a monopoly on weather data in the North Atlantic and Arctic oceans. Meteorological intelligence was important as it affected military planning and the routing of ships and convoys. In some circumstances, visibility was necessary (photographic reconnaissance and bombing raids) and in others concealment (keeping ship movements secret or suppressing enemy air activity). D-day planning was greatly affected by weather forecasting; it was delayed by one day in the expectation that a storm would blow out and sea conditions would be acceptable. British sources of data included ships at sea and the weather stations at Valentia Observatory and Blacksod Point, in neutral Ireland; German use of weather ships also exposed their secret Enigma codes.

== Ocean weather vessels ==
In 1939, United States Coast Guard vessels were being used as weather ships to protect transatlantic air commerce. The Atlantic Weather Observation Service was authorised by President Franklin Delano Roosevelt on January 25, 1940. By February 1941, five 327 ft (100 m) Coast Guard cutters were used in weather patrol, usually deployed for three weeks at a time, then sent back to port for ten days. The cutters were needed for the war effort and by August 1942, six cargo vessels were used instead. The ships were modified with guns and depth charge projectors, and crews were trained and regularly drilled in gunnery but the former cargo ships had top speeds of 10–12 kn (19–22 km/h; 12–14 mph), significantly less than U-boats, that could reach 16 kn (30 km/h; 18 mph) on the surface. USCGC Muskeget was torpedoed with 121 crewmen aboard on September 9, 1942. In 1943, the United States Weather Bureau recognised their observations as "indispensable" for the war effort.

The flying of fighter aircraft between North America, Greenland and Iceland led to the deployment of two more weather ships in 1943 and 1944. The United Kingdom established one 50 mi (80 km) off the west coast of Britain. By May 1945, sixteen ships were in use north of the 15th parallel north in the Atlantic, with six more in the tropical Atlantic. Twenty United States Navy frigates were used in the Pacific for similar operations. Weather Bureau personnel stationed on weather ships were asked to volunteer for the assignment. They used surface weather observations, radiosondes and pilot balloons (PIBALs) to determine weather conditions aloft. Due to its value, operations continued after the war, leading to an international agreement in September 1946 that no fewer than 13 ocean weather stations would be maintained by the Coast Guard, with five others maintained by Great Britain and two by Brazil.

The Germans began to use weather ships in the summer of 1940 but three of its four ships were sunk by November 23, which led to the use of fishing vessels for its weather ship fleet. German weather ships were out to sea for three to five weeks at a time and would have Enigma machine and codes for several months to send weather observations in cipher. Their radio reports exposed their location to the superior British High-frequency direction finding system and their encryption provided additional fodder for British cryptanalysts.

Harry Hinsley worked on plans to seize Enigma machines and keys from the German weather ships, to help Bletchley Park to resume their cryptanalysis of the Enigma Navy version, as the inability to decode the new M4 Shark cypher was seriously affecting the Battle of the Atlantic. München and Lauenburg were boarded by the Royal Navy, that managed to gather valuable information on German codes in each case. Wuppertal became trapped in ice and was lost without trace of ship or crew.

== Land stations ==
The Germans made attempts to set up land-based weather stations in contested locations such as Spitsbergen and even on Allied-held shores, such as the automated Weather Station Kurt in Labrador. The Germans were obliged, by their continental location, to rely largely on long-range aircraft and weather ships—which were vulnerable to attack—and on clandestine stations in exposed locations. The Allies had a distinct advantage in the contest, controlling all of the major islands (Newfoundland, Greenland, Iceland, Great Britain) of the North Atlantic. As weather patterns at that latitude generally travel west to east, the Allies could follow the progress of a front as it travelled across the Atlantic. The Germans, with their small number of (impermanent) observation stations, had to rely on a certain amount of luck to detect a weather front before it reached Europe.

In August 1941, in the preparation for Operation Gauntlet (the occupation of Spitsbergen), the Royal Navy destroyed the weather station on Bear Island and later, one on Spitsbergen (after it had transmitted false information to discourage air observation). Spitsbergen was an important location: it enabled the Germans to monitor the weather on the Allied convoy route to northern Russia. The Germans made several attempts to establish weather stations in the Svalbard archipelago including Spitsbergen and Hopen (Hope Island: stations Svartisen and Helhus) and these were never suppressed. Other locations used included those on Jan Mayen Island, Bear Island (Taaget, 1944–1945) and eastern Greenland with teams and automated stations. The Kriegsmarine operated the manned Schatzgräber station on Alexandra Land in the Soviet Franz Josef Land archipelago from November 1943 to July 1944.

== Air meteorological patrols ==
The RAF operated 518 Squadron from RAF Tiree in the Hebrides, 519 Squadron from RAF Wick and RAF Skitten in Caithness, Scotland and 517 Squadron from RAF Brawdy, in south-west Wales, to fly meteorological sorties into the Atlantic. Flying standard patrol patterns, Halifaxes, Hudsons and B-17s and other aircraft made meteorological readings at various heights from 50 ft (15 m) to their ceiling of 18,000 ft (5,500 m), at prescribed points along the patrols. The patrols were long (up to 11 1/2 hours); in often poor weather and sometimes dangerous, at least ten aircraft from 518 Squadron were lost with all hands during 1944. Meteorological reports from air patrols influenced the timing of D-Day. The critical patrol experienced severe weather and its crew's reports were so extreme that they were not believed at first. A similar patrol from Brawdy reported similarly bad conditions but was lost with its crew.

== In popular culture ==
The historical novel Turbulence by Giles Foden portrays the efforts of James Stagg, Lewis Fry Richardson (fictionalised as Wallace Ryman) and others to predict the weather ahead of the D-Day landings. The play Pressure by David Haig is a fictional version of the 72 hours leading up to D-day revolving around the arguments between James Stagg, Irving P. Krick and Dwight Eisenhower.

== See also ==
- Weather events during wars
- Operation Haudegen set up a weather station on Svalbard in 1944

== Notes ==
=== References ===
- "Atlantic Weather Project". Weather Bureau Topics. 11 (4): 61. April 1952. OCLC 962853980.
- Kahn, David (2001). Seizing the Enigma: The Race to Break the German U-boat Codes, 1939–1943. Barnes & Noble. ISBN 978-0-7607-0863-7.
- Pringle, Geoff (December 2003). "518 Squadron and the Key to the D Day Landings!". oldnautbits.com.
- Sebag-Montefiore, Hugh (2001) [2000]. Enigma: The Battle For The Code (4th, pbk. Phoenix ed.). London: Weidenfeld & Nicolson. ISBN 978-0-75381-130-6.
- Willoughby, Malcolm Francis (1980). The U.S. Coast Guard in World War II. Ayer. ISBN 978-0-405-13081-6.
