= Weather Station Kurt =

Nazi German automatic weather station in Labrador, Dominion of Newfoundland

Weather Station Kurt
- Wetter-Funkgerät Land-26
- Martin Bay, Dominion of Newfoundland
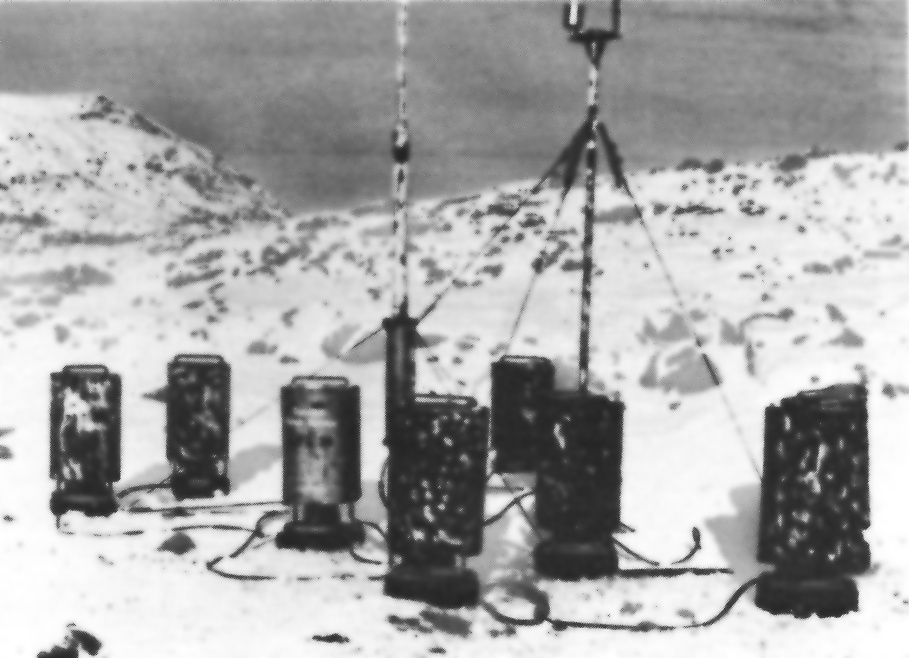
- German Weather Station Kurt set up on the Hutton Peninsula, Labrador on 22 October 1943

Site information
- Operator: Kriegsmarine
- Controlled by: Germany

Location
- Location of Weather Station Kurt
- Location within Newfoundland and Labrador
- Coordinates: 60°05′00″N 64°22′51″W

Site history
- Built: 22 October 1943
- Built by: Kurt Sommermeyer & Walter Hildebrant
- In use: 1943–1944
- Demolished: 1981
- Battles/wars: Battle of the Atlantic

Weather Station Kurt (Wetter-Funkgerät Land-26) was an automatic weather station, erected by a German U-boat crew of the Kriegsmarine at Martin Bay in northern Labrador, Dominion of Newfoundland (now part of Canada), in October 1943. Installing the equipment for the station was the only known armed German military operation on land in North America (outside of Greenland) during the Second World War. After the war, it was forgotten until its rediscovery in 1977.

== Background ==
In the northern hemisphere, weather systems in temperate climates predominantly move from west to east. This gave the Allies an important advantage. The Allied network of weather stations in North America, Greenland, and Iceland allowed the Allies to make more accurate weather forecasts than the Germans.

German meteorologists used weather reports sent by U-boats and weather ships, such as Lauenburg, operating in the North Atlantic. They also had reports from clandestine weather stations in remote parts of the Arctic and readings collected over the Atlantic by specially equipped weather aircraft.

However, the ships and clandestine stations were easily captured by the Allies during the early part of the war. Data from aircraft was incomplete as they were limited in range and susceptible to Allied attack. Regular weather reporting by U-boats put them at risk as it broke radio silence, allowing the Allies to locate them and track their movements by radio triangulation.

== Development and deployment ==
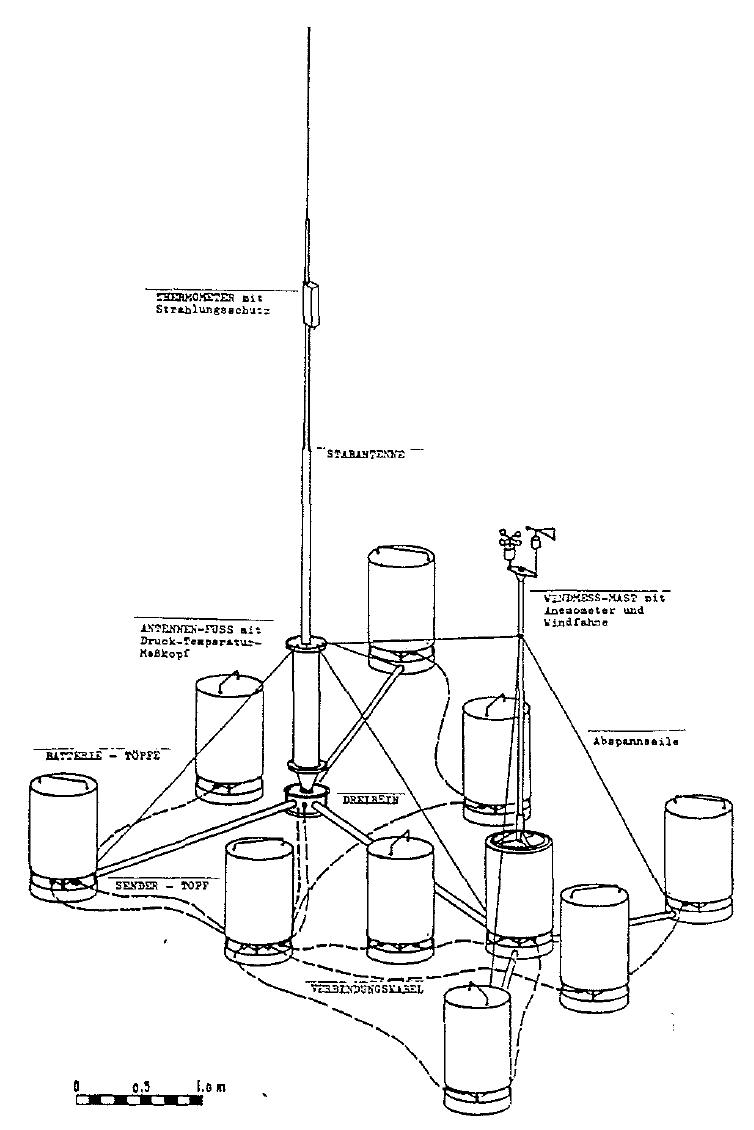
Diagram of a deployed Wetter-Funkgerät Land

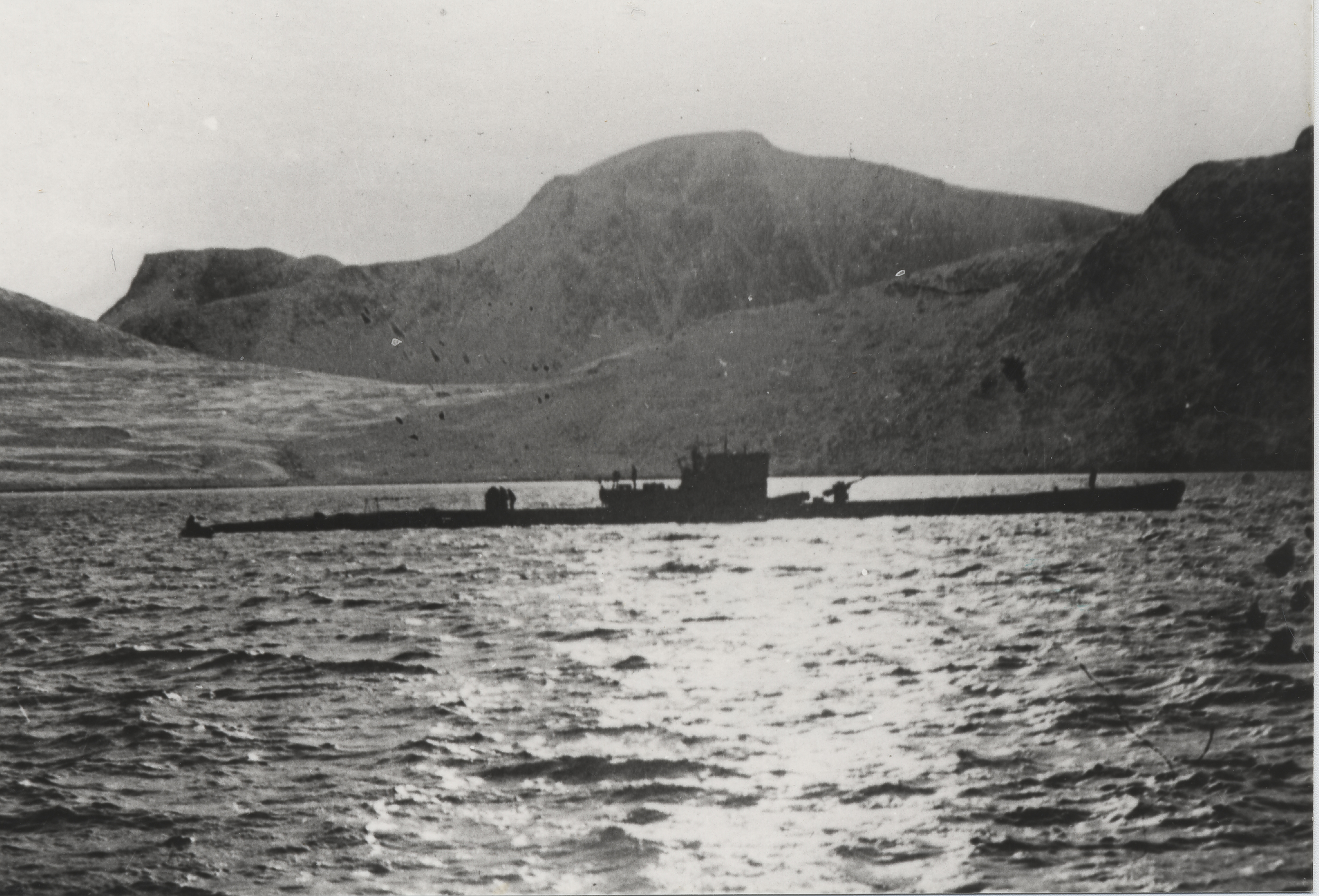
Type IXC/40 submarine U-537 at anchor in Martin Bay, Labrador

To gather more weather information, the Germans developed the Wetter-Funkgerät Land (WFL) automatic weather station. It was designed by Dr. Ernst Ploetze and Edwin Stoebe. Twenty-six were manufactured by Siemens. The WFL had an array of measuring instruments, a telemetry system and a 150 watt, Lorenz 150 FK-type transmitter. It consisted of 10 cylindrical canisters, each 1 metre (3.3 ft) by c. 47 cm (19 in) diameter (1.5 m [4.9 ft] circumference) and weighing around 100 kilograms (220 lb). One canister contained the instruments and was attached to a 10-metre (33 ft) antenna mast. A second, shorter mast carried an anemometer and wind vane. The other canisters contained the nickel-cadmium batteries that powered the system. The WFL would send weather readings every three hours during a two-minute transmission on 3940 kHz. The system could work for up to six months, depending on the number of battery canisters. Fourteen stations were deployed in Arctic and sub-Arctic regions (Greenland, Bear Island, Spitsbergen, and Franz Josef Land) and five were placed around the Barents Sea. Two were intended for North America. One was deployed in 1943 by the German submarine U-537, but the submarine carrying the other station, U-867, was sunk with depth charges in September 1944 northwest of Bergen, Norway, by a British air attack.

On 18 September 1943, U-537, commanded by Kapitänleutnant Peter Schrewe, departed from Kiel, Germany, on her first combat patrol. She carried WFL-26, codenamed "Kurt;" meteorologist Dr Kurt Sommermeyer and his assistant Walter Hildebrant. En route, the U-boat was caught in a storm and a large breaker produced significant damage including leaks in the hull and the loss of the submarine's quadruple anti-aircraft cannon, leaving it both unable to dive and defenceless against Allied aircraft.

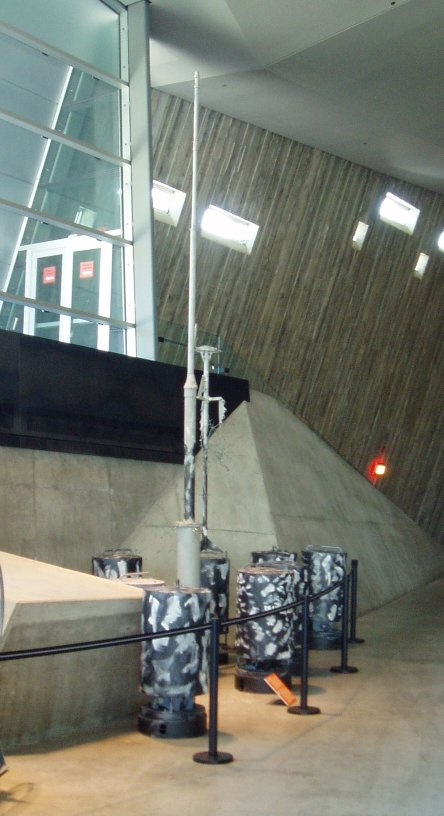
Weather Station Kurt on display at the Canadian War Museum (2007)

On 22 October, U-537 arrived at Martin Bay in northern Labrador at a position 60°5′0.2″N 64°22′50.8″W. This is close to Cape Chidley at the north-eastern tip of the Labrador Peninsula. Schrewe selected a site this far north as he believed this would minimize the risk of the station being discovered by Inuit. Within an hour of dropping anchor, a scouting party had located a suitable site and soon after, Sommermeyer, Hildebrant and 10 sailors disembarked to install the station. Armed lookouts were posted on nearby high ground and other crew members set to repair the submarine's storm damage. For concealment, the station was camouflaged. Empty American cigarette packets were left around the site to deceive any Allied personnel that chanced upon it. One canister was marked and misspelled "Canadian Meteor Service," in order to simulate "Canadian Weather Service" as a German attempt to avoid suspicion if discovered, though no such agency existed in Canada. In addition, the area was part of the Dominion of Newfoundland and was not part of Canada until 1949. The crew worked through the night to install Kurt and repair their U-boat. They finished just 28 hours after dropping anchor and, after confirming the station was working, U-537 departed. However, the weather station functioned for only a few days before its signals became degraded and within three weeks it permanently failed. The U-boat undertook a combat patrol in the area of the Grand Banks of Newfoundland during which she survived three attacks by Canadian aircraft, but sank no ships. The submarine reached port at Lorient, France, on 8 December after 70 days at sea. She was sunk with all hands 11 months later on 11 November 1944 by the submarine USS Flounder near the Dutch East Indies.

External videos
- The Nazi Weather Station in North America from YouTube channel Half as Interesting.

== Rediscovery ==
The German weather station was forgotten until 1977 when Peter Johnson, a geomorphologist working on an unrelated project, stumbled upon it. He suspected it was a Canadian military installation and named it "Martin Bay 7". Around the same time, retired Siemens engineer Franz Selinger, who was writing a history of the company, went through Sommermeyer's papers and learned of the station's existence.

He contacted Canadian Department of National Defence historian W. A. B. Douglas, who went to the site with a team in 1981 and found the station still there, although the canisters had been opened and components strewn about the site. Weather Station Kurt was removed from its site and is now part of the collection of the Canadian War Museum in Ottawa.

== See also ==
- North Atlantic weather war
- Schatzgräber (weather station) in the former Soviet Union
