= German weather ship Lauenburg =

German weather ship

Coordinates: 71°00′N 8°20′W

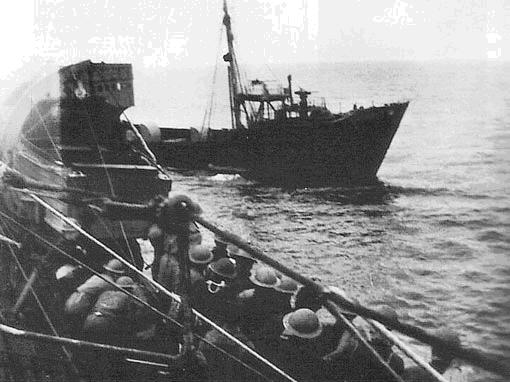
- HMS Tartar's boarding party prepares to board the weather ship Lauenburg north east of Jan Mayen

History

Nazi Germany
- Name: Lauenburg
- Namesake: Lauenburg/Elbe
- Laid down: 1 July 1936
- Launched: 1938
- Acquired: 1940
- Commissioned: November 1940
- Fate: Sunk 28 June 1941

General characteristics
- Type: Converted trawler
- Complement: 19–21 crew; 8 meteorologists

Lauenburg was a German weather ship used in the early years of the Second World War to provide weather reports for German shipping, particularly German U-boats. After the German use of such vessels had been identified as a weakness that could be exploited to break the Enigma code, Lauenburg was captured and sunk on 28 June 1941. The Royal Navy acquired important German code books and parts of an Enigma machine.

== Early life ==
Lauenburg had been built in 1938 as a fishing trawler, named after the town of Lauenburg, and with the identification number 'PG 532'. She operated out of Geestemünde for her owners, H. Bischoff & Co, of Bremen. She was acquired by the Kriegsmarine in 1940, and entered naval service in November, having been converted into a weather ship, retaining the name Lauenburg. In her new guise she carried a crew of between 19 and 21, as well as eight meteorologists. She was to be used to provide detailed weather reports for naval units, including Germany's U-boat fleet.

== The weather ships and Enigma ==
The British cryptologist Harry Hinsley, then working at Bletchley Park, realised at the end of April 1941 that the German weather ships, usually isolated and unprotected trawlers, were using the same Enigma code books as were being used on U-boats. The trawlers, which transmitted weather reports to the Germans, were being sent naval Enigma messages.

Although the weather ships did not transmit enciphered weather reports on Enigma machines, they needed one to decode the Enigma signals transmitted to them. Hinsley realised that if the code books could be captured from one of these trawlers, the naval Enigma system could be broken, with British intelligence able to decipher messages to U-boats and discover their locations. The problem remained that if the navy were to attempt to capture one of the weatherships, the German crew would have time to destroy or throw their Enigma settings into the sea before they were boarded. Hinsley instead reasoned that the following month's Enigma settings would be locked in a safe aboard the ship and could be overlooked if the Germans were surprised and forced hastily to abandon ship. The Admiralty despatched seven destroyers and cruisers to the northeast of Iceland at the beginning of May 1941. The target was München, one of the weather ships operating in the area. The weather ship and the Enigma settings for June 1941 were captured and naval Enigma messages transmitted during June 1941 were quickly deciphered.

Halfway through June 1941 the Germans replaced the bigram tables used in Enigma. This would have resulted in a codebreaking blackout unless further settings could be captured. Hinsley and the Admiralty were concerned that capturing another weather ship might alert the Germans to their vulnerability and cause them to immediately alter them. It was eventually decided to take the risk and on 25 June 1941, the light cruiser HMS Nigeria and the destroyers HMS Tartar, HMS Jupiter and HMS Bedouin, were despatched from Scapa Flow to capture the codebooks from Lauenburg, another weather ship operating north of Iceland, which Hinsley had selected.

== Capture and sinking of Lauenburg ==
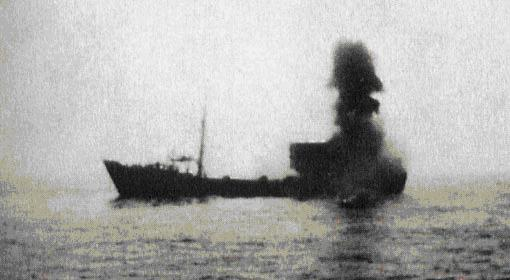
Lauenburg is sunk by Royal Navy gunfire

At around 7pm on 28 June, a lookout aboard Tartar sighted Lauenburg off Jan Mayen and the destroyer opened fire. Lauenburg's crew quickly abandoned the ship in two lifeboats. Minutes later, Tartar steamed alongside and a boarding party seized Lauenburg and a large amount of material was collected, then the Allied warships sank Lauenburg with gunfire; confirmation of the sinking was sent by radio, but the boarding was specifically not mentioned so that listening Germans would not suspect the recovery of Enigma materials. The recovered material allowed further understanding of the Enigma codes and resulted in faster decoding of encrypted messages, as well as providing an up-to-date set of codes.

== See also ==
- Cryptanalysis of the Enigma
- North Atlantic weather war
