= Jamie D. Ramsay =

South African cinematographer

- Other names: Jamie Ramsay; Jamie D Ramsay
- Education: AFDA
- Years active: 2006–present
- Organisations: South African Society of Cinematographers; British Society of Cinematographers
- Website: www.jamiedramsay.com

Jamie D. Ramsay is a South African cinematographer. He earned two British Independent Film Award nominations for his work on the films Moffie (2019) and All of Us Strangers (2023), and won Camerimage Bronze Frog for his work on Living (2022).

== Early life and education ==
Jamie D. Ramsay had an interest in the visual arts from a young age, partly owing to his mild dyslexia. He took up photography when his grandfather gave him a camera, which developed into a passion for cinematography.

He graduated from AFDA, The School for the Creative Economy in 2005.

== Career ==
Ramsay was responsible for cinematography for the 2026 World War II drama film Pressure, which was co-written and directed by Anthony Maras and starred Andrew Scott.

== Recognition ==
Ramsay appeared on the 2021 Variety list of 10 Cinematographers to Watch.

He is a member of both the South African Society of Cinematographers and the British Society of Cinematographers.

=== Awards and nominations ===
Year	Award	Category	Work	Result	Ref.
2019	British Independent Film Awards	Best Cinematography	Moffie	Nominated	
2022	Camerimage	Bronze Frog	Living	Won	
2022	Dublin Film Critics' Circle	Best Cinematography	Living	Nominated	

== Filmography ==
Film

Year	Title	Director	Ref.
2008	Lullaby	Darrell Roodt	
2008	Triomf	Marlene van Niekerk	
2009	Shirley Adams	Oliver Hermanus	
2011	Beauty	Oliver Hermanus	
2019	Moffie	Oliver Hermanus	
2021	Mothering Sunday	Eva Husson	
2021	She Will	Charlotte Colbert	
2022	Living	Oliver Hermanus	
2022	See How They Run	Tom George	
2023	All of Us Strangers	Andrew Haigh	
2024	William Tell	Nick Hamm	
2024	Goodrich	Hallie Meyers-Shyer	
2026	Pressure	Anthony Maras	
2026	Being Heumann	Sian Heder	
TBA	Black Palace †	Nick Hamm	

Short film

Year	Title	Director
2009	Father Christmas Doesn't Come Here	Bheki Sibiya
2016	Commando	Robin Goode
2019	Beast	Sye Allen

Television

Year	Title	Director	Notes
2020	Noughts + Crosses	Julian Holmes	3 episodes
