= Trafford Leigh-Mallory =

Royal Air Force Air Chief Marshal (1892–1944)

Air Chief Marshal Sir Trafford Leigh-Mallory KCB DSO & Bar
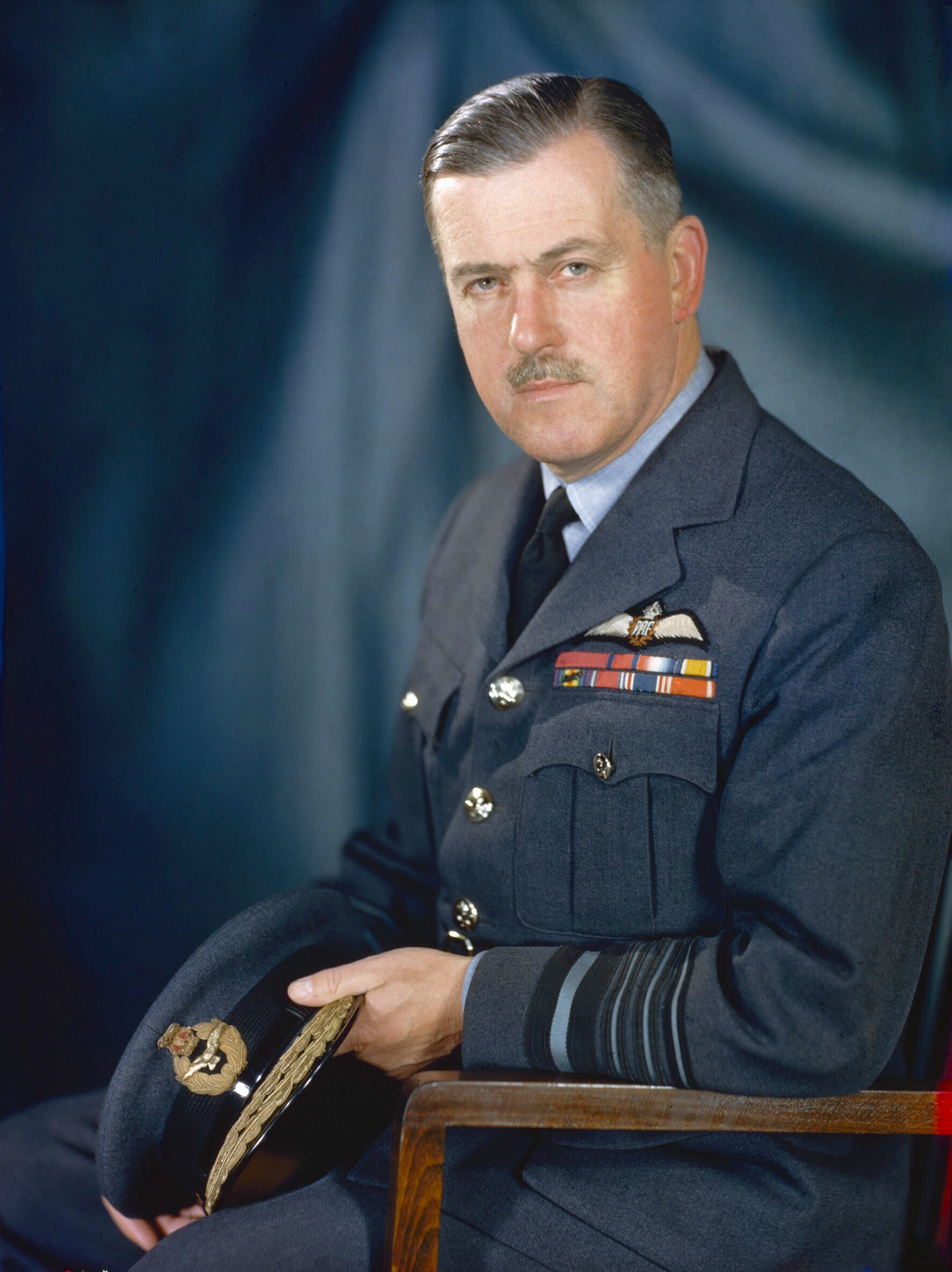
- Leigh-Mallory in c. 1944
- Born: 11 July 1892; Mobberley, Cheshire, England
- Died: 14 November 1944 (aged 52); French Alps
- Military career
- Allegiance: United Kingdom
- Branch: British Army (1914–1918); Royal Air Force (1918–1944)
- Service years: 1914–1944
- Rank: Air Chief Marshal
- Commands: Allied Expeditionary Air Force (1943–1944); Fighter Command (1942–1943); No. 11 Group (1940–1942); No. 12 Group (1937–1940); No. 2 Flying Training School (1934–1935); School of Army Co-operation (1927–1929); No. 8 Squadron (1917–1918); No. 15 Squadron (1917)
- Conflicts: First World War; Second Battle of Ypres; Battle of the Somme; Second World War; Battle of Britain; Dieppe Raid; Battle of Normandy
- Awards: Knight Commander of the Order of the Bath; Distinguished Service Order & Bar; Mentioned in Despatches (3); Commander's Cross with Star of the Order of Polonia Restituta (Poland); Order of Kutuzov, 1st Class (USSR); Chief Commander of the Legion of Merit (United States)

Air Chief Marshal Sir Trafford Leigh-Mallory, KCB, DSO & Bar (11 July 1892 – 14 November 1944) was a senior commander in the Royal Air Force. Leigh-Mallory served as a Royal Flying Corps pilot and squadron commander during the First World War. Remaining in the newly formed RAF after the war, Leigh-Mallory served in a variety of staff and training appointments throughout the 1920s and 1930s.

At the start of the Second World War, Leigh-Mallory was Air Officer Commanding (AOC) No. 12 (Fighter) Group and during the Battle of Britain. However he has been criticised for his political machinations within the Air Ministry, particularly with Sholto Douglas, that led to the replacement of Hugh Dowding and Keith Park on 25 November 1940, less than a month after the end of the Battle of Britain. Leigh-Mallory replaced Park at No. 11 (Fighter) Group and Sholto Douglas replaced Dowding as head of RAF Fighter Command. In 1942, Leigh-Mallory became Commander-in-Chief (C-in-C) of Fighter Command before being selected in 1943 to be the C-in-C of the Allied Expeditionary Air Force, which made him the air commander during the Allied Invasion of Normandy.

Leigh-Mallory died in November 1944 while en route to Ceylon to take up the post of Air Commander-in-Chief South East Asia Command when his aircraft crashed in the French Alps, killing all eight people on-board including his wife.

== Early life ==
Trafford Leigh-Mallory was born in Mobberley, Cheshire, the son of Herbert Leigh Mallory, (1856–1943), Rector of Mobberley, who legally changed his surname to Leigh-Mallory in 1914. He was the younger brother of George Mallory, the noted mountaineer. Leigh-Mallory grew up in a large house with many servants including a butler, a valet and a footman as well as numerous maids and gardeners. He was educated at Haileybury and at Magdalene College, Cambridge where he was a member of a literary club and where he made the acquaintance of Arthur Tedder, the future Marshal of the Royal Air Force. He passed his Bachelor of Laws degree and had applied to the Inner Temple in London to become a barrister when, in 1914, war broke out.

== First World War ==
Leigh-Mallory immediately volunteered to join a Territorial Force battalion of the King's (Liverpool Regiment) as a private. He was commissioned as a second lieutenant on 3 October 1914 and transferred to the Lancashire Fusiliers though officer training kept him in England when his battalion embarked. In the spring of 1915, he went to the front with the South Lancashire Regiment and was wounded during an attack at the Second Battle of Ypres. He was promoted to lieutenant on 21 June 1915.

After recovering from his wounds, Leigh-Mallory joined the Royal Flying Corps in January 1916 and was accepted for pilot training. On 7 July 1916, he was posted, as a lieutenant in the RFC, to No. 7 Squadron, where he flew on bombing, reconnaissance and photographic operations during the Battle of the Somme.

He was then transferred to No. 5 Squadron in July 1916 before returning to England. He was promoted to temporary captain on 2 November 1916.

Leigh-Mallory's first combat command was No. 8 Squadron in November 1917. In the period after the Battle of Cambrai, No. 8 Squadron was involved in army cooperation, directing tanks and artillery. At the Armistice, Leigh-Mallory was mentioned in dispatches and awarded the Distinguished Service Order.

== Interwar years ==
After the war, Leigh-Mallory thought of re-entering the legal profession, but with little prospect of a law career, he stayed in the recently created Royal Air Force (RAF), with promotion to major on 1 August 1919 (the rank was renamed "squadron leader" on the same date), and command of the Armistice Squadron.

Promoted to wing commander on 1 January 1925, Leigh-Mallory passed through the RAF Staff College in 1925 and received command of the School of Army Cooperation in 1927 before eventually being posted to the Army Staff College, Camberley in 1930. He was now a leading authority on army cooperation and in 1931, lectured at the Royal United Services Institute on air cooperation with mechanized forces. He spent a little over a year in the Protectorate of Uganda, arriving in the country in the late autumn of 1929 and returning to England in December 1931.

Promoted to group captain on 1 January 1932, Leigh-Mallory received a posting to the Air Ministry in 1932 and was then assigned to the British delegation at the Disarmament Conference in Geneva under the auspices of the League of Nations, where he made many contacts. After the collapse of the conference, he returned to the Air Ministry and attended the Imperial Defense College, the most senior of the staff colleges. However, lack of senior command experience meant a spell as commander of No. 2 Flying School and station commander at RAF Digby before serving as a staff officer overseas. He was posted to the RAF in Iraq in Christmas 1935, and, having been promoted to air commodore on 1 January 1936, he returned to England to be appointed commander of No. 12 Group, Fighter Command in December 1937. He was visiting Harlaxton Manor when he received the news that he was now commander of No. 12 Group.

== Second World War ==
=== Battle of Britain ===
Leigh-Mallory took command of 12 Group and proved an energetic organiser and leader. On 1 November 1938, he was promoted to air vice-marshal, one of the younger air vice-marshals then serving in the RAF. He was greatly liked by his staff, but his relations with his airfield station commanders were strained.

=== No. 12 Group and the "Big Wing" ===
During the Battle of Britain, Leigh-Mallory quarreled with Air Vice-Marshal Keith Park, the commander of 11 Group.

Park, who was responsible for the defence of south east England and London, had stated that 12 Group was not doing enough to protect his airfields in the south-east.

This was because Leigh-Mallory had devised with Squadron Leader Douglas Bader a massed fighter formation known as the "Big Wing", which they used to hunt German bomber formations.

Leigh-Mallory was critical of the tactics of Park who was backed by Sir Hugh Dowding, head of Fighter Command. Leigh-Mallory believed that not enough was being done to allow wing-sized formations to operate successfully.

The problem was that many RAF fighter stations and other vital targets were in the county of Kent, relatively close to German airfields in France.

To defend these targets before bombs could be dropped on them needed quick reaction from RAF fighters. To do this there was not time to form fighters into a large "Wing" before they were ready for combat with German bombers. This was critical if they were to be attacked before they had already dropped their bombs on vital targets.

Leigh-Mallory then worked energetically in political circles to bring about the removal of Park from command of 11 Group. The exaggerated claims for the effectiveness of the Duxford Big Wing successes played a part.

However, throughout the Battle of Britain in the summer of 1940, his lack of rapid support for Park's 11 Group contributed to the damage that the Luftwaffe was able to inflict on 11 Group's airfields. Fortunately, after RAF bomber raids on Berlin (which inflicted little damage) Goering was so incensed that he diverted the German bombing effort from the RAF fighter airfields to London. This produced much damage to London but saved Fighter Command bases from further destruction that could have been disastrous to their continued ability to respond to German attacks.

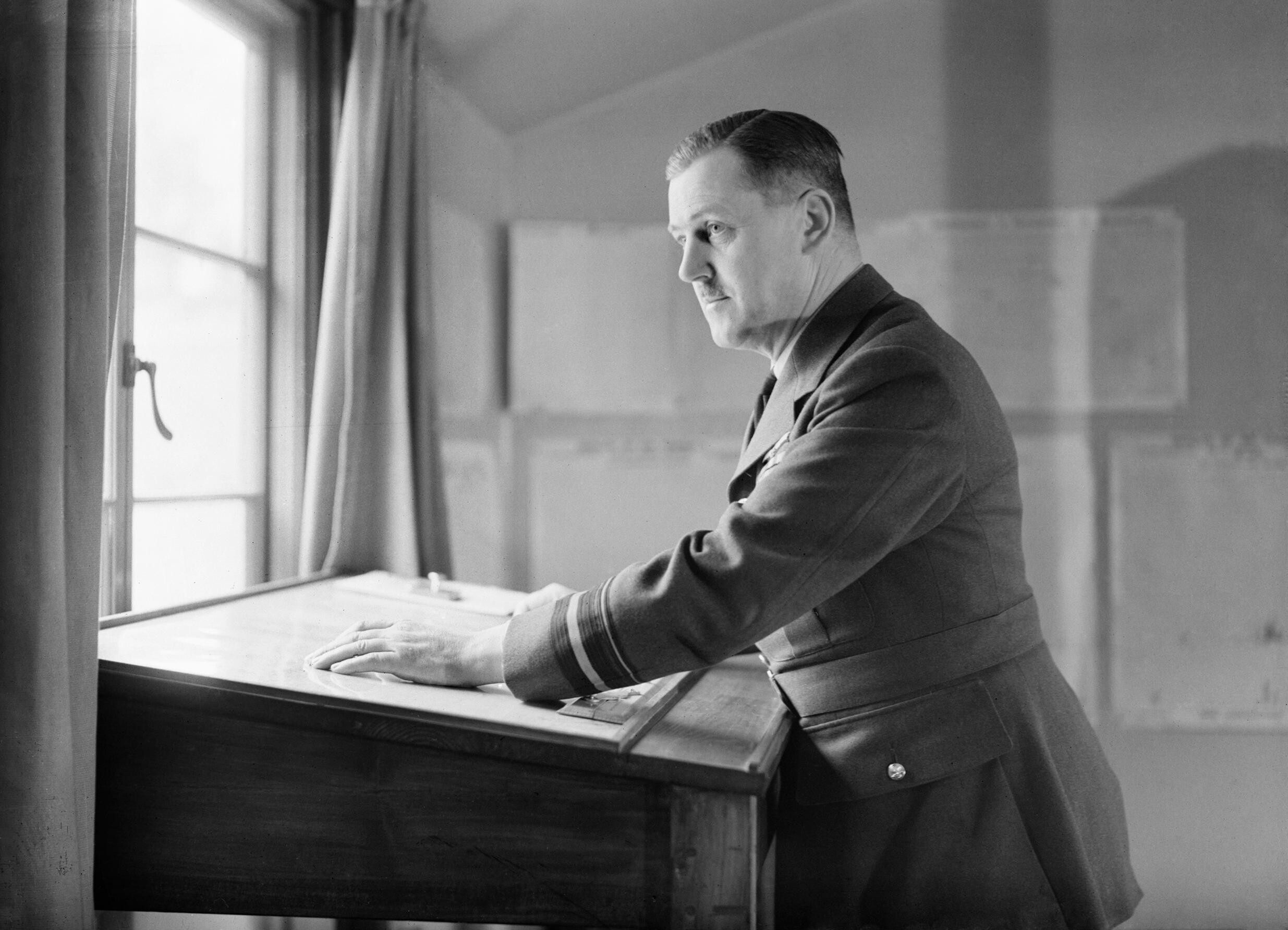
Leigh-Mallory at No. 11 Group Headquarters, Uxbridge, Middlesex.

After the Battle of Britain, Dowding retired and Air Chief Marshal Charles Portal, the new Chief of the Air Staff, transferred Park to a new post.

Leigh-Mallory took over from Park as commander of 11 Group in December 1940.

=== Fighter Command and D-Day ===
One of the reasons for Leigh-Mallory's appointment to command 11 Group was that he was seen as an offensively-minded leader in the Trenchard mould. Once appointed he soon introduced wing-sized fighter sweeps into France, known as "rodeos" (when accompanied by bombers to provoke enemy fighters, these were known as "Circus" operations).

However, Leigh-Mallory came in for criticism as these raids over enemy territory caused heavy RAF casualties with over 500 pilots lost in 1941 alone, losing four aircraft for each German aircraft destroyed and having little effect on ground targets. Indeed, during this period the German armed forces were mobilizing for Operation Barbarossa and few Luftwaffe fighters remained in western Europe. It was indeed a steep learning curve for Leigh Mallory despite the fact that the Luftwaffe had made similar mistakes during the Battle of Britain and there were few other senior RAF commanders who had understanding of this. One of his staff officers pointed out: "In my opinion we learned a hell of a lot – how to get these raids in, by deceiving radar and by counter-offensive techniques. [In the Middle East] they were still in the First World War business – they'd learned none of the deception techniques such as sending in high-level fighters and sneaking the bombers in underneath." Keeping 75 squadrons of fighters, mainly to conduct ineffective offensive operations from Britain during 1941, was also questionable while Malta and Singapore were only defended by older, obsolete types of aircraft. The RAF's best commanders and air-warfare tacticians were in the Mediterranean area around this time achieving greater success over Malta and North Africa than their counterparts back home. Leigh-Mallory was promoted to acting air marshal on 13 July 1942.

In November 1942, Leigh-Mallory replaced Sholto Douglas as head of Fighter Command and was promoted to the temporary rank of air marshal on 1 December 1942.

He was made a Knight Commander of the Order of the Bath in January 1943 and following a tour of air and army headquarters in Africa began lobbying for a unified command of the Allied air forces for the forthcoming invasion of Europe. There was considerable resistance to such a post with none of the vested air force interests – including Arthur Tedder, Arthur Harris at Bomber Command, and Carl Spaatz of the US Army Air Force – appearing interested in ceding any authority or autonomy. This was, of course, exactly why a unified commander was needed and Leigh-Mallory, with his experience with army cooperation, was a candidate for the job. In August 1943, Leigh-Mallory was appointed commander-in-chief of the Allied Expeditionary Air Force for the Normandy invasion. He was promoted to the substantive rank of air vice-marshal on 15 December 1943 and to the substantive rank of air marshal on 1 January 1944.

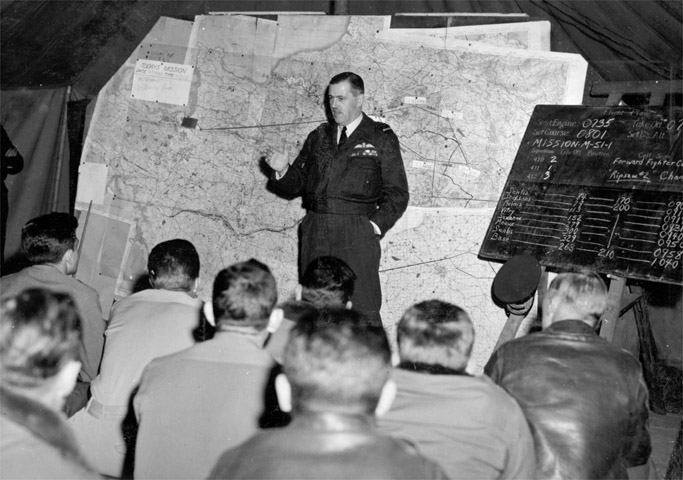
Leigh-Mallory at a squadron briefing in France in September 1944.

As many of these "interdiction" bombing missions took place against transport nodes, such as towns and villages, Leigh-Mallory came under political pressure to limit the effects of attacks on French civilians. He resisted, insisting that sacrifices were unfortunate but necessary if the air plan was to have any effect. His air plan succeeded in greatly slowing the mobilization of the German Army and his experience at army cooperation paid dividends. General Bernard Montgomery was pleased with the air support and told the War Office: "We must definitely keep Leigh-Mallory as Air Commander-in-Chief. He is the only airman who is out to win the land battle and has no jealous reactions."

== Personal life ==
Leigh-Mallory married Doris Sawyer in 1915; the couple had two children. He was a keen sailor and cricket fan.

After one of his children survived a serious illness, Leigh-Mallory became interested in faith healing and spiritualism. He was a practising Christian and consistently donated portions of his salary to charity, which he kept private during his life, and it was only revealed after his death. In one anecdote, he suggested he had seen the ghost of Emily Langton Massingberd, the women's rights campaigner, at Gunby Hall in Lincolnshire. When the building was threatened with demolition during the Second World War to make way for an airfield, Leigh-Mallory intervened to save it. The property is now managed by the National Trust.

== Death ==
On 16 August 1944, with the Battle of Normandy almost over, Leigh-Mallory was appointed Air Commander-in-Chief of South East Asia Command (SEAC) with the temporary rank of air chief marshal. But before he could take up his post, on 14 November, he and his wife were killed en route to Burma when their Avro York MW126, flown by Squadron Leader Charles Gordon Drake Lancaster (DFC and Bar), crashed in the French Alps, killing all on board. A court of inquiry found that the accident was a consequence of bad weather and might have been avoided if Leigh-Mallory had not insisted that the flight proceed in such poor conditions against the advice of his aircrew. His replacement at SEAC was his Battle of Britain rival Air Marshal Sir Keith Park.

He and his wife are buried, alongside eight aircrew, in Le Rivier d'Allemont, 15 miles (24 km) east-southeast of Grenoble, a short distance below the site of the air crash. To mark the 60th anniversary of the accident and Leigh-Mallory's death, the local commune opened a small museum near the crash site, dedicated to him, in 2004.

== Legacy ==
Battle of Britain-class steam railway locomotive number 34109, built for the Southern Region of British Railways in 1950, was named Sir Trafford Leigh-Mallory.

== Cultural portrayals ==
Alister Cameron played Leigh-Mallory in the 2014 Edinburgh / Chichester Festival and 2018 UK tour of the play Pressure. Andrew MacBean played the role in the 2018 West End production and David Sibley played Leigh-Mallory in the 2023 Toronto production.

Leigh-Mallory was portrayed by actor Patrick Wymark in the 1969 film, Battle of Britain, and by Con O'Neill in the 2026 film Pressure.

== Sources ==
- Deighton, Len. Battle of Britain. London: Michael Joseph, 1980. ISBN 0-7181-3441-9.
- Gilbert, Martin. Finest Hour. London: Heinemann, 1983. ISBN 978-0-434-29187-8.
- Korda, Michael. With Wings Like Eagles: A History of the Battle of Britain. New York: HarperCollins, 2009. ISBN 978-0-06-112535-5.
- Regan, Geoffrey. The Guinness Book of Flying Blunders. London: Guinness Books, 1996. ISBN 0-85112-607-3.

Military offices
Preceded by John Tyssen	Air Officer Commanding No. 12 Group; 1937–1940	Succeeded by Richard Saul
Preceded by Keith Park	Air Officer Commanding No. 11 Group; 1940–1942	Succeeded by Hugh Saunders
Preceded by Sir Sholto Douglas	Commander-in-Chief Fighter Command; 1942–1943	Succeeded by Sir Roderic Hill
