= Allied Expeditionary Air Force =

Air force of allies during World War II

The Allied Expeditionary Air Force (AEAF), also known as the Allied Armies’ Expeditionary Air Force (AAEAF), was the expeditionary warfare component of the Supreme Headquarters Allied Expeditionary Force (SHAEF) which controlled the tactical air power of the Allied forces during Operation Overlord during World War II in 1944.

Its effectiveness was less than optimal on two counts. It did not function as the controlling headquarters for all Allied air forces, with the strategic forces of RAF Bomber Command and the US Eighth Air Force being retained by their national command authorities until pressure from U.S. General Dwight D. Eisenhower resulted in them being placed directly under SHAEF instead of AEAF. Its commander was also not universally liked. Sir Trafford Leigh-Mallory was regarded by some as being too inept for his place in the high command.

It had two major components, the RAF Second Tactical Air Force and the USAAF Ninth Air Force. Each supported their own nation's Army Group. It also had operational control of the Air Defence of Great Britain, but with that organisation not being under the control of SHAEF.

AEAF was dissolved after Leigh-Mallory was reassigned to command RAF forces in the Far East, later being killed in an air crash.

== See also ==
- List of Royal Air Force commands
