= Maureen Flavin Sweeney =

Irish postmistress (1923–2023)

- Born: Mary Christine Flavin; 3 June 1923
- Died: 17 December 2023 (aged 100)
- Occupations: Post mistress, weather observer
- Known for: Made first observation of coming storm that threatened Allied vessels in the English Channel, led to change of date for 1944 invasion of France

Maureen Flavin Sweeney (3 June 1923 – 17 December 2023) was an Irish postmistress. She grew up in County Kerry but moved to Blacksod, County Mayo, at the age of 18 to take up a position at a post office. One of Flavin Sweeney's duties was to make weather observations that were reported to Allied forces during the Second World War. Blacksod's position on the west coast made it one of the first stations to report westerly storms.

On 3 June 1944, her 21st birthday, Flavin Sweeney made the first observation of a coming storm that threatened Allied vessels in the English Channel. Following her observation and that of other weather observers, the U.S. commander, General Dwight D. Eisenhower, agreed to postpone the invasion of France by 24 hours, from 5 June to 6 June. After the war, Flavin Sweeney took over the post office, running it until her retirement in the 2000s. She received recognition for her wartime role from the U.S. Congress in 2021.

== Early life ==
Maureen Flavin was born in Knockanure, in County Kerry, on 3 June 1923, her birth was registered as Mary Christine. She passed her secondary school examinations and, on reaching the age of 18, found herself looking for employment. Flavin Sweeney had no family in County Kerry and had dreamed of moving to America. However, her nearest relative, an uncle, ran a pub at Blacksod, County Mayo, on the western coast. He offered her accommodation. She travelled for two days to reach Blacksod to answer an advertisement offering a position as a clerk at the Department of Posts and Telegraphs local post office.

After being accepted for the post by postmistress Margaret Sweeney, she discovered that the post office also operated a weather station, important for forecasting as it lay on one of the most westerly parts of Ireland. Under an August 1939 agreement, the station was one of a number in Ireland that provided daily weather readings to the British Met Office via telegraph. Measurements were taken from instruments housed on a corner of nearby Blacksod Lighthouse.

== Second World War ==
After the outbreak of the Second World War, known as The Emergency in Ireland, the Irish government agreed to give the British weather reports from the station at Blacksod Lighthouse. This was important data as it was one of the first stations on Ireland's Atlantic coast that could warn of approaching westerly weather systems. Weather observers were sometimes required to take hourly weather readings. As the date in June 1944 approached for the planned Allied invasion of German-occupied France (Operation Overlord), the observers at Blacksod weather station were asked to make detailed hourly measurements.

On 3 June 1944, her 21st birthday, Flavin Sweeney got up at 1 am Double British Summer Time, to make the hourly reading. The station instruments showed a slight drop in air pressure, a 7-mile-per-hour (11 km/h) wind from the south-west and a slight drizzle. The drop in pressure was the first indication of an incoming severe storm that could make hazardous conditions for any crossing of the English Channel. Flavin Sweeney woke Ted Sweeney, the postmistress' son (and Flavin's future husband), to confirm the readings as he was more experienced with the instruments (Margaret and her daughter Frances also made readings at other times during the war). Ted Sweeney confirmed Flavin Sweeney's readings and the report was sent on to Britain. Measurements made over the following reports from 2 am to 7 am showed a continuing drop in pressure, with a steady wind and worsening rain. These conditions were confirmed by nearby stations.

Royal Air Force officer James Stagg was the chief meteorologist to General Dwight D. Eisenhower, Supreme Allied Commander of the Allied Expeditionary Force (SHAEF). At around 11 am Stagg had his office call the Blacksod post office direct to confirm their readings, bypassing the usual liaison office at Dublin. As a result of the weather reports Eisenhower agreed to a postponement of the invasion by 24 hours, from 5 to 6 June, potentially saving lives from stormy waters.

== Later life ==
Flavin Sweeney went on to marry Ted Sweeney in 1946. They continued to operate the weather station at Blacksod until it was automated in 1956. It was at this point that the pair was first made aware of the important role their weather reports had on the planning of Operation Overlord. Flavin Sweeney succeeded her mother-in-law as postmistress at Blacksod and retired in the early 2000s. As of 2023 her son, Vincent Sweeney, is the lighthouse keeper at Blacksod.

By May 2020 she was at the Tí Aire nursing home in Belmullet, County Mayo, when she survived a COVID-19 infection.

In June 2021, Flavin Sweeney was honoured by the United States Congress for her role in the Second World War. Her name was entered into the Congressional Record and she received a medal from the House of Representatives. U.S. Congressman and former U.S. Marine Corps Lieutenant-General Jack Bergman said "her skill and professionalism were crucial in ensuring Allied victory, and her legacy will live on for generations to come". Flavin Sweeney also received a certificate from the National WWII Museum in New Orleans.

On the occasion of her 100th birthday in 2023, Flavin Sweeney received cards from Bergman and Irish President Michael D. Higgins. She died age 100 at Tí Aire nursing home on 17 December 2023.
