= Irving P. Krick =

American meteorologist and inventor (1906–1996)

Irving Krick
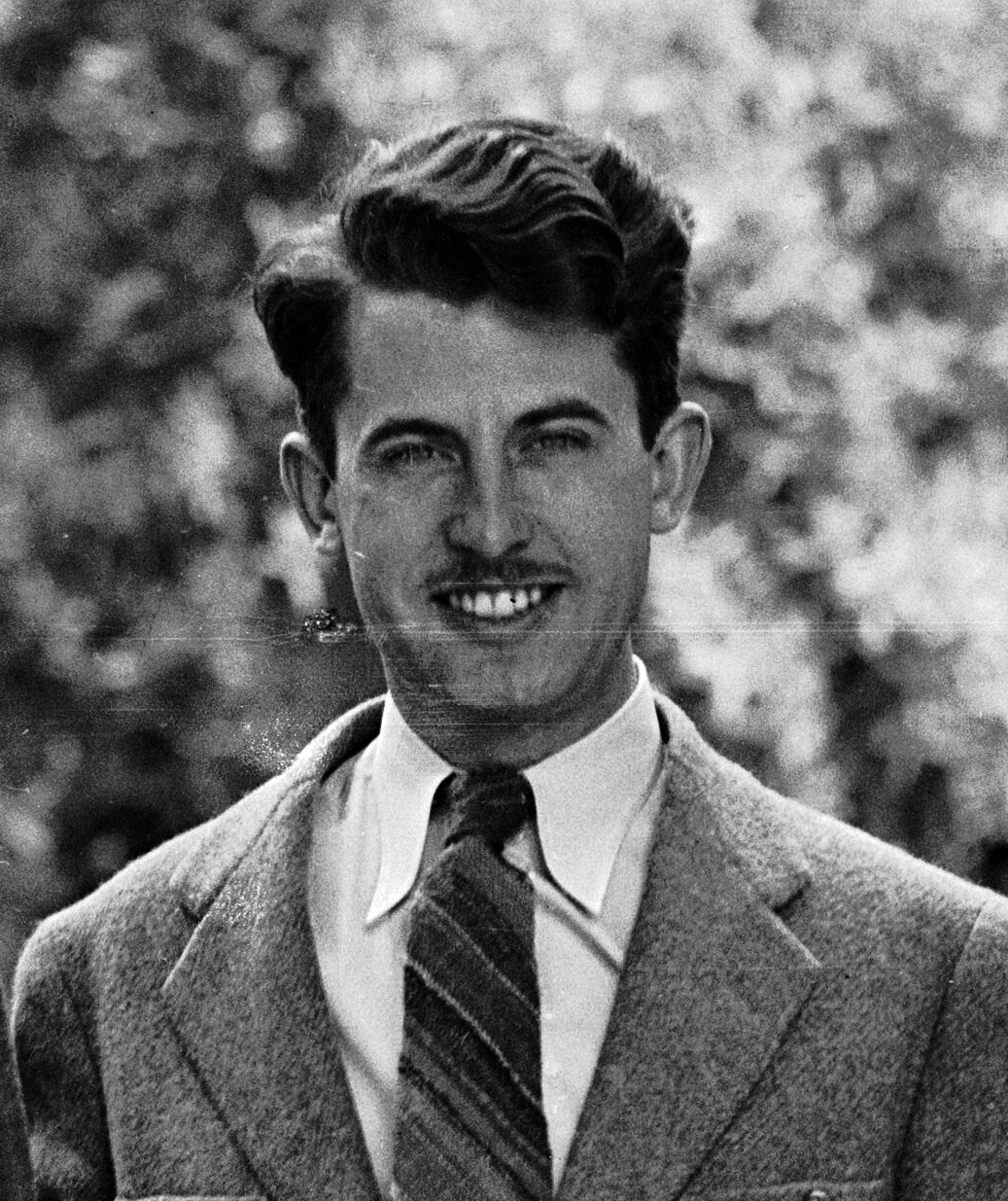
- Born: December 20, 1906; San Francisco, California, U.S.
- Died: June 20, 1996 (aged 89); Pasadena, California, U.S.
- Education: University of California, Berkeley (BS); California Institute of Technology (MS, PhD)

Irving P. Krick (December 20, 1906 – June 20, 1996) was an American meteorologist and inventor, the founding professor of Department of Meteorology at California Institute of Technology (1933–1948), one of the U.S. Air Force meteorologists who provided forecasts for the Normandy Landings in 1944, a controversial pioneer of long-term forecasting and cloud seeding, and "a brilliant American salesman" who in 1938 started the first private weather business in the United States.

== Early years ==
Krick was born in San Francisco in 1906. He attended college at the University of California at Berkeley, where he was a member of Tau Kappa Epsilon fraternity, achieving a bachelor's degree in physics. However, his first career aspiration was music. Krick was an accomplished pianist and pursued music professionally but found it financially unrewarding. While still in his early twenties he worked at a radio station and at a stock brokerage – until the Wall Street crash of 1929. Finally, working for an airline and advice from his brother-in-law, Horace Byers, an MIT graduate, helped him find his true interest in weather.

== Caltech ==
Around 1930, he began studying at the California Institute of Technology in the Department of Aeronautics, which provided only a few courses in meteorology, notably by Beno Gutenberg (atmospheric structure) and Theodore von Kármán (aeronautics), Krick's advisors in his doctoral studies. Caltech offered the first dedicated meteorology class in the 1933–34 season. Krick made his name known by a controversial paper asserting that the 1933 crash of USS Akron was a direct consequence of a mistaken forecast by the Weather Bureau. Krick's paper was instrumental to von Kármán's work explaining the actual cause of Akron disaster; he was also instrumental in determining the cause of the USS Macon crash in 1935. These publications brought Krick to the attention of the U.S. Army Air Corps; Krick befriended future Air Corps chief Hap Arnold, then a colonel stationed at March Field not far from Caltech.

Krick completed his doctoral degree in 1934 and remained at Caltech as an instructor. In 1937 he helped found the school's meteorology department and became its head. The department was unique in its commercial focus on the needs of profitable industries, including not just aviation, but almost anyone willing to pay, including the movie industry, for which Krick famously forecast the weather for the burning of Atlanta in Gone with the Wind. Krick was determined about making money; "weather forecasting was his product line, although, like many a great salesmen, his number one product was himself". He then stayed as a professor, offering a special curriculum for Arnold's nascent Air Force Weather Service.

Caltech terminated the meteorology department in 1948. In response, Krick left the school to start his own firm, taking with him most of the department staff.

== World War II ==
With the outbreak of World War II Arnold recruited Krick into the United States Army Air Corps. Krick prevailed over other, scientifically inclined meteorologists: while they searched for causes of natural phenomena, Krick relied on analyzing historic patterns and cycles. He reused old weather maps that resembled current situation, arguing that future weather developments will most likely follow the recorded patterns – the same "weather typing" that brought him commissions from Hollywood studios. Critics called Krick's methods "canned memory". The primitive methods and aggressive salesmanship made Krick an enemy of scientific elite like George Cressman and Carl-Gustaf Rossby and Weather Bureau chief Francis W. Reichelderfer, who detested Krick as a "smug, supremely self-confident self-promoter". However, with Arnold's backing Krick was nearly invincible.

In 1944 Krick was engaged in meteorology support for the upcoming Allied Normandy Landings (see Weather forecasting for Operation Overlord), along with rival weather services from the United Kingdom. On May 28 Sverre Petterssen, a Norwegian meteorologist in British service, raised concerns that a coming storm would break out on June 2 and interfere with the landings planned on June 5. Krick argued to the contrary, asserting that there was no need to postpone the offensive – he envisaged nothing but continuously quiet weather over the following five days. Krick based his confidence on studies of 50 years of recorded weather; he was certain that the English Channel would be protected by the Azores High, a pressure pattern dominating over the eastern Atlantic. Unusually, as time passed by the uncertainties of the vital weather forecast did not dissolve, and consequently tension between Krick and Petterssen increased further. Finally, on June 3, Colonel Donald Yates (deputy to chief meteorologist James Stagg), a former student of Krick and one of the few people who could handle him, intervened in the rivalry and persuaded the Allied meteorologists to produce a joint weather forecast. In the end, Petterssen's opinion prevailed; despite Krick's initial objection, the landings were delayed by one day, saving the troops from a major disaster.

The controversy was fictionalised in the 2014 play Pressure by David Haig, with Krick appearing as a central character; the play however does not make reference to Petterssen's role, instead making an uncompromising Stagg the hero who, by persuading Eisenhower that he was right and Krick wrong, saved countless lives by insisting that the landing be postponed by a day.

== Post-war practice ==
After leaving Caltech, Krick continued offering commercial long-term weather forecasts. He also added the service of cloud seeding, forcing precipitation in drought-affected areas.

In summer of 1948 Krick performed the first series of 27 airborne cloud seeding tests over central Arizona, dropping up to 300 pounds (140 kg) of ice particles on each flight. Indeed, the seeded clouds released rain, raising water levels in local reservoirs. The "rain makers" admitted that the result had other, natural, causes, but in a year that was one of the driest on record it was a significant success. Financially, the volume of water added by Krick's experiment cost only $2.50, compared to $14 going rate. In December 1949 Krick suggested cloud seeding without resorting to airborne devices; his proposal employed ground-based smoke generators dispersing vaporized silver iodide. A single smoke dispenser set, asserted Krick, could be moved by two wheelbarrows; it theoretically provided cloud-seeding particles for an area of 240 square miles (620 km^{2}). Tests demonstrated a fourfold increase in precipitation. By 1951 his cloud-seeding business had 120 employees and had been hired to seed clouds over 330 million acres (1,300,000 km^{2}) in the western United States as well as parts of Mexico and San Salvador.

However, the American meteorological establishment opposed his practice, asserting his methods of cloud seeding were bogus and the weather could not be forecast for more than five days in the future. Krick decided to offer his long term forecasting to the Weather Bureau, but they too did not believe in his methods, so he started a private business. He successfully proved his basic premises, making a substantial profit from forecasts and weather making. Krick's practice caught the eye of many famous figures, and he was hired to forecast the weather for presidential inaugurations and movie shoots. He garnered attention in 1957 when his prediction of sunny weather for President Eisenhower's second inauguration, made 17 days before the event, came true.

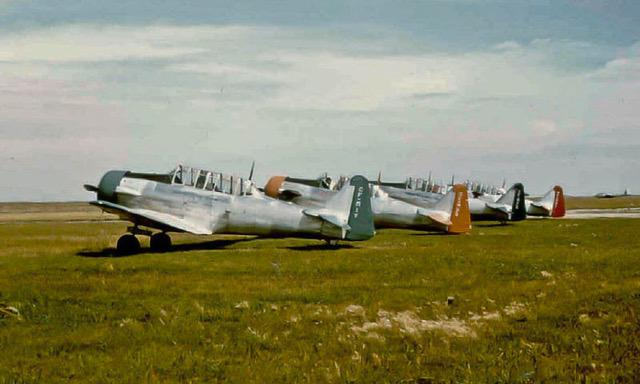
Mark 2 and Mark 4 Harvards used in a hail suppression project based in Calgary, Alberta

During the mid-sixties, Irving P. Krick & Associates operated a successful cloud seeding operation in the area around Calgary, Alberta. This utilized both aircraft and ground-based generators that pumped silver iodide into the atmosphere in an attempt to reduce the threat of hail damage. Ralph Langeman, Lynn Garrison, and Stan McLeod, all ex-members of the RCAF, attending the University of Alberta, spent their summers flying hail suppression. A number of surplus Harvard aircraft were fitted with racks under each wing containing 32 railroad fuzees that were impregnated with silver iodide. These could be ignited individually or all at once, depending upon the threat. In coordination with ground units, the aircraft would lay a plume of silver iodide in front of approaching cumulonimbus clouds with noticeable effect. Large, active CBs were reduced to nothing. Heavy hail storms were reduced in intensity.

This effective program was funded by farmer contributions and government grants. The program was run each summer and did much to reduce crop damage by hail, otherwise the farm community would not have continued to finance the project.

In 1990 Krick sold his weather business to Strategic Weather Services, renamed in 2000 to Planalytics, remaining with that company as chairman emeritus until his 1996 death from heart failure.

== Bibliography ==
- Randy Cerveny; Ron Holle (July–August 2008). "Irving P. Krick: Weather Fraud or Weather Genius". Weatherwise Magazine. 61 (4): 20–27. doi:10.3200/WEWI.613.4.20-27. S2CID 193179751.
- Irving P. Krick (1933). Topography versus air masses : a discussion of the phenomena associated with the passage of air masses over the irregularities of the earth's surface (Master's thesis). California Institute of Technology. doi:10.7907/J2T7-4638.
- Irving P. Krick (1934). I. Foehn winds of southern California. II. Foehn wind cyclo-genesis. III. Weather conditions associated with the Akron disaster. IV. The Los Angeles storm of December 30, 1933 to January 1, 1934 (PhD thesis). California Institute of Technology. doi:10.7907/R9ZR-0776.
