= Pressure (play) =

2014 play by David Haig

- Official poster of the 2014 Lyceum production
- Original language: English
- Written by: David Haig
- Setting: 1944, Operation Overlord

Premiere
- Date: 1 May 2014
- Place: Royal Lyceum Theatre, Edinburgh
- Directed by: John Dove

Pressure is a 2014 play written by David Haig, based on true events that took place during World War II. It centres on the true story of James Stagg and the weather forecasts that determined the date of the D-Day landings as part of Operation Overlord. The personal and military stresses of Stagg, the tensions between the teams with different weather forecasts for the date of the proposed D-Day, and the events of the 72 hours leading up to D-Day are explored throughout the play. It premiered at the Royal Lyceum Theatre in Edinburgh in May 2014, and had its West End premiere at the Ambassadors Theatre in June 2018. The play had its North American premiere at the Royal Alexandra Theatre in Toronto in January 2023.

== Premise ==
The play is set in 1944 during World War II, at Southwick House, which was the headquarters of the Allied Expeditionary Force The Allied forces, led by General Dwight D. Eisenhower, are looking to invade continental Europe from Britain.

The 72-hour period leading up to the launch of Operation Overlord is fraught with stress and tensions over the date of the proposed D-Day. Recognizing the notoriously dangerous conditions of the English channel, General Eisenhower employs two meteorologists to advise him on which date would be best to launch the invasion. Group captain James Stagg is the chief meteorologist, who has extensively studied weather patterns in the North Atlantic and understands the volatility of Northern European weather. American weatherman Irving P. Krick (here portrayed as Stagg's assistant) analyses historic weather patterns and cycles to predict future weather conditions.

Despite a prolonged heat wave, Stagg is convinced that the weather conditions will suddenly deteriorate sharply on June 5, the current date of the proposed D-Day, and that the planned invasion should therefore be postponed. Meanwhile, Krick believes forecasts of a calm sunny day on June 5 and believes that the plans should proceed as usual. While attempting to convince Eisenhower that his forecast of the weather conditions is correct, Stagg struggles with his own fear of potentially getting the forecast wrong.

== Production history ==
The play was commissioned by the Royal Lyceum Theatre, who hired playwright and actor David Haig to write the script. Haig worked with director John Dove to research the story of Scottish meteorologist James Stagg, and his weather forecasting leading up to D-Day. Haig was intrigued by his story, as well as the stories of General Eisenhower and Kay Summersby, and opted to make the trio the core of the show.

=== Edinburgh / Chichester Festival Theatre ===
Pressure was originally scheduled to make its world premiere in May 2013 at the Royal Lyceum Theatre in Edinburgh, Scotland, but the premiere was postponed because the producers had difficulties casting the lead role. On 30 April 2013, it was announced that the show would instead premiere in May 2014 at the Royal Lyceum Theatre. The show opened on 1 May 2014, ahead of an official opening night on 6 May 2014, before closing on 24 May 2014. The show then transferred to the Chichester Festival Theatre, where it played at the Minerva Theatre from 31 May 2014 to 28 June 2014. The world premiere production was directed by John Dove.

Haig played the lead role of James Stagg, despite being reluctant to do so, because of his fears of portraying "a Scot authentically". Malcolm Sinclair and Laura Rogers rounded out the lead cast, respectively playing Dwight Eisenhower and Kay Summersby.

=== UK tour / West End ===
In November 2017, a UK Tour was announced, with Haig, Sinclair, and Rogers each reprising their roles. The tour opened on 1 February 2018 at the Cambridge Arts Theatre and closed on 28 April 2018 at London's Park Theatre.

Following the success of the UK Tour, it was announced that the tour would transfer to London's West End, with Haig, Sinclair, and Rogers again reprising their roles. Pressure premiered in the West End at the Ambassadors Theatre on 6 June 2018, playing there until 1 September 2018. The West End transfer of the production coincided with the 74th anniversary of the D-Day landings.

On 5 June 2019, extracts from the play were performed by the West End cast at Portsmouth, to commemorate the 75th anniversary of D-Day. Several world leaders and dignitaries were in attendance, including Queen Elizabeth, Prime Minister Theresa May, French President Emmanuel Macron, US President Donald Trump, and Canadian Prime Minister Justin Trudeau.

=== Toronto ===
The show was originally planned to make its North American premiere in September 2020, but it was postponed as a result of the COVID-19 pandemic. On 8 June 2022, it was announced that Pressure would have its North American premiere at the Royal Alexandra Theatre in Toronto, Canada. It opened on 24 January 2023 and closed on 5 March 2023. On 29 September 2022, it was announced that Kevin Doyle would star as James Stagg, with Malcolm Sinclair and Laura Rogers reprising their roles.

== Cast and characters ==
=== Cast ===
Original cast of Pressure

Role	Edinburgh / Chichester Festival	UK Tour	West End	Toronto
Role	2014	2018	2018	2023
James Stagg	David Haig	David Haig	David Haig	Kevin Doyle
General Eisenhower	Malcolm Sinclair	Malcolm Sinclair	Malcolm Sinclair	Malcolm Sinclair
Kay Summersby	Laura Rogers	Laura Rogers	Laura Rogers	Laura Rogers
Colonel Irving P. Krick	Tim Beckmann	Phil Cairns	Phil Cairns	Phil Cairns
Admiral Bertram “Bertie” Ramsay/ Electrician	Michael Mackenzie	Michael Mackenzie	David Killick	David Killick
Lieutenant Battersby / Captain Johns	Anthony Bowers	William Mannering	William Mannering	William Mannering
Hamilton	Scott Gilmour	Robert Heard	Robert Heard	Robert Heard
Secretary	Molly Roberts	Molly Roberts	Molly Roberts	Molly Roberts
Commander Franklin / General “Tooey” Spaatz	Gilly Gilchrist	Mark Jax	Mark Jax	Stuart Milligan
Air Chief Marshal Sir Trafford Leigh-Mallory	Alister Cameron	Alister Cameron	Andrew MacBean	David Sibley
Andrew	Robert Jack	Bert Seymour	Bert Seymour	Matthew Darcy

=== Characters ===
- James Stagg: a Group captain and Scottish meteorologist advising Allied countries on weather conditions during WWII.
- General Eisenhower: the Supreme Commander of the Allied forces during WWII who faces the daunting responsibility of D-Day.
- Kay Summersby: the Irish chauffeur and secretary assigned to Eisenhower, who also serves as a much-needed confidant.
- Irving P. Krick: an American businessman and meteorologist on Eisenhower's staff who assists Stagg despite his disagreements with the former's methods.

== Critical reception ==
=== Edinburgh / Chichester Festival Theatre ===
The world premiere productions at Edinburgh's Royal Lyceum Theatre and at the Chichester Festival Theatre received positive reviews, although there was some criticism about the show's pacing.

Reviewing the play for The Observer, Clare Brennan wrote that it was an "intricate and well-crafted drama" that addressed our emotions, beliefs, and judgements, and the role of nature in our lives. Brennan also praised the ensemble cast performances, particularly Haig, Sinclair, and Rogers. Joyce McMillan of The Scotsman wrote that Pressure was "well-shaped, tightly-constructed, and skilfully presented." In a positive review, Josie Balfour in the Edinburgh Evening News wrote, "Haig's script quickly sets up the story and plunges into a fast paced, confident stride, pausing only briefly before an almighty storm."

In a mixed review, Alan Radcliffe of The Times felt that the show moved at "an urgent pace" but had an "overly long closing chapter." Thom Dibdin of The Stage referred to the show as "fascinating and dramatic", but criticized the slow pace at the start of the show.

=== UK Tour / West End ===
The UK Tour and West End productions of Pressure received mostly positive reviews.

Reviewing the UK Tour, Sara Crompton of WhatsOnStage found the show "riveting" with a simple but effective set design, and wrote that the show "...covers a lot of ground without ever resorting to patriotic cliché." Meanwhile, Nick Wells of Radio Times praised the research done for the show, writing that "Haig has obviously done his research, and then smartly played with the facts for full dramatic effect. You wouldn’t think a story about predicting the weather could play like a thriller, but it does." Wells also singled out the performances of Sinclair, as General Eisenhower, and Rogers, as Kay Summersby. Aleks Sierz of The Arts Desk wrote that while he liked the set design and the reliance on accuracy, he felt the role of Kay Summersby felt somewhat underdeveloped.

Reviewing the West End production for The Guardian, Michael Billington praised the attention to detail, the show's nuance, and the ability to create tension and suspense, even though the outcome was apparent. Douglas Mayo, of BritishTheatre.com, praised Sinclair's "brash and commanding" performance as General Eisenhower, and described the scenes between Stagg and Krick as "electric". Andrzej Lukowski of Time Out was more critical, awarding the show three out of five stars in a mixed review. Although Lukowski found the show enjoyable and appreciated the focus on simply telling the story, he felt that Haig's inexperience as a playwright was sometimes apparent, particularly at the start of the show.

Rosemary Lunn, an experienced diver, who reviewed the show for the International Dive Magazine, praised the research done for the show and the accurate depictions given of the English Channel. Lunn also noted that the show gave her a deeper appreciation of the weather conditions the Allied forces had endured to get to France.

At the 2019 Laurence Olivier Awards, Malcolm Sinclair received a nomination for Best Actor in a Supporting Role.

=== Toronto ===
The Toronto production received positive reviews.

Christopher Hoile praised the show, writing that it was a "tautly written play of mounting tension, leavened with humour. The production is beautifully detailed and the acting and direction are impeccable." Hoile further commented that the play "keeps us on the edge of our seats", despite the audience already knowing the outcome. Martin Morrow of The Globe and Mail gave a positive review of the show, writing that it was an "...intense but frequently entertaining history lesson." Morrow also praised the cast, and felt that the play maintained a strong level of intensity and suspense, with some injections of humor. Samantha Wu of BroadwayWorld praised the performances of Malcolm Sinclair, Kevin Doyle, and Laura Rogers.

In a more mixed review, Joshua Chong of Next Magazine commented that the play felt formulaic and that the portrayal of Irving P. Krick as a "stereotypical macho American" was lacking.

== Film adaptation ==
In July 2024, it was announced that the play was being adapted into a film, which will star Brendan Fraser as General Eisenhower and Andrew Scott as James Stagg. Anthony Maras was signed on to direct. The film was released in the United States on May 29, 2026, and received generally positive reviews.
