= James Stagg =

Scottish meteorologist (1900–1975)

Group Captain James Stagg CB OBE FRSE
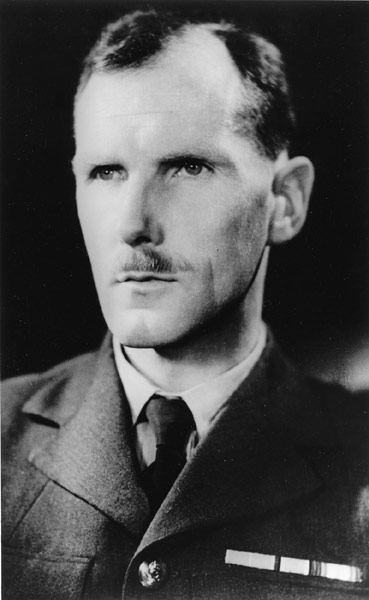
- Born: James Martin Stagg; 30 June 1900; Musselburgh, [Midlothian], Scotland
- Died: 23 June 1975 (aged 74); Seaford, East Sussex, England
- Education: University of Edinburgh (BA, MA, DSc)
- Children: 2, including Peter
- Military career
- Allegiance: United Kingdom
- Branch: Royal Air Force Volunteer Reserve
- Service years: 1918-1919; 1943–1945
- Rank: Group Captain
- Conflicts: First World War; Second World War
- Awards: Companion of the Order of the Bath; Officer of the Order of the British Empire; Officer of the Legion of Merit (United States)

James Martin Stagg CB, OBE, FRSE (30 June 1900 – 23 June 1975) was a Scottish Met Office meteorologist attached to the Royal Air Force (RAF) during the Second World War who notably persuaded General Dwight D. Eisenhower to change the date of the Allied invasion of Europe from 5 to 6 June 1944.

== Early life ==
Stagg was born on 30 June 1900 in Musselburgh, East Lothian, Scotland, to Alexander C. Stagg and his wife, Helen (Ellen). He was educated at Dalkeith High School in Dalkeith until the age of 15. As Dalkeith High did not provide further education, he completed his schooling at Broughton Junior Student Centre in Edinburgh.

In 1921, Stagg graduated with an undergraduate Master of Arts (MA Hons) from the University of Edinburgh. He then became a teacher and worked as science master at George Heriot's School in Edinburgh. On 7 April 1923, he was commissioned as a second lieutenant in the Officers' Training Corps (OTC), to serve with the George Heriot's School contingent of the junior division of the OTC (the equivalent of what is now the Combined Cadet Force).

== Meteorological career ==
In 1924 Stagg became an assistant in the British Meteorological Office, and he was appointed superintendent of Kew Observatory in 1939. In the winter of 1932/33 he led the British Polar Expedition of Arctic Canada. In 1936, he received a Doctor of Science (DSc) degree from the University of Edinburgh for a collection of papers on terrestrial magnetism. In the 1937 Coronation Honours, he was appointed Officer of the Order of the British Empire (OBE) for his work as a senior technical officer with the Air Ministry's Meteorological Office.

Stagg was appointed the Chief Meteorological Officer, SHAEF for Operation Overlord. On 6 November 1943, he was granted an emergency commission with the rank of group captain in the Royal Air Force Volunteer Reserve; this lent him the necessary authority in a military milieu unused to outsiders.

Stagg worked with three forecasting teams from the Royal Navy, Met Office and the USAAF. Details of the D-Day forecasts come from accounts published by participants, including Stagg himself.

=== D-Day weather ===
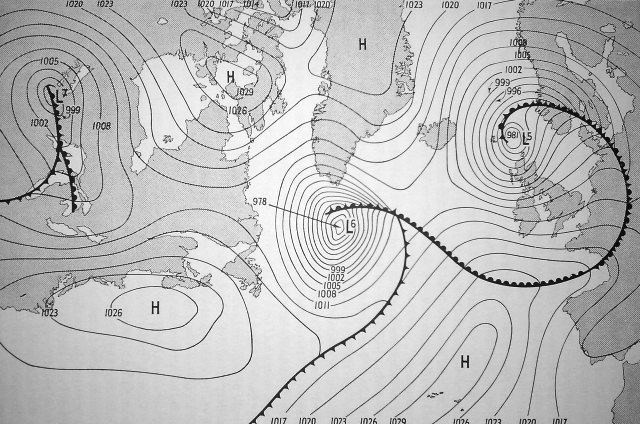
Surface weather analysis map showing weather fronts on 5 June 1944

Planners of the Normandy landings in June 1944 focused first upon a specific overlap of the tides, the time of day, and the phase of the moon; these conditions would be satisfactory on only a few days in each month. A full moon—desirable but not essential—would provide the best illumination for aircraft pilots and paratroopers, as well as the highest tides. Planners placed the landings shortly before dawn, mid-way between the tides, with the tide coming in, as this would improve the visibility of obstacles on the beach while minimising the amount of time the men would spend exposed in the open. Eisenhower tentatively selected 5 June as the date for the assault. However, at 13:00 on 3 June, 21-year-old Maureen Flavin Sweeney became the first to observe the severe storm approaching Europe across the Atlantic Ocean. Despite Ireland's official neutrality during World War Two, information gathered by the Irish Meteorological Service was shared with the Allies. Mrs Sweeney received a phone call from Stagg's office asking for the readings to be checked again. She re-ran the tests and confirmed her results.

Stagg met Eisenhower on the evening of 4 June. Using Sweeney's observational data, he and his meteorological team (primarily the UK Met Office at Dunstable's Sverre Petterssen) predicted stormy conditions on 5 June but forecasted enough of an improvement on 6 June for the invasion to proceed. The next available dates with the required tidal conditions (but without the desirable full moon) would not be until two weeks later, from 18 to 20 June. Postponement of the invasion would have required recalling men and ships already in position to cross the Channel, and would have increased the chance that Axis intelligence would detect the invasion plans. After much discussion with the other senior commanders, Eisenhower decided that the invasion should go ahead on the 6th. A major storm battered the Normandy coast from 19 to 22 June, which would have made beach landings impossible.

Allied control of the Atlantic gave Allied meteorologists an advantage in the North Atlantic weather war for storm prediction. As the Luftwaffe meteorological centre in Paris predicted two weeks of stormy weather, many Wehrmacht commanders left their posts to attend war games in Rennes, and men in many units were given leave. German Commander Field Marshal Erwin Rommel returned to Germany both for his wife's birthday and to meet with Hitler in an attempt to obtain more Panzers.

For his invaluable services over the D-Day period, Stagg was appointed an Officer of the US Legion of Merit in October 1945.

== Later life ==
Group Captain Stagg later worked as director of services at the Meteorological Office ('the Met Office') until 1960.

Stagg was appointed Companion of the Order of the Bath (CB) in the 1954 New Year Honours. He was elected as a Fellow of the Royal Society of Edinburgh in 1951. His proposers were Edmund Dymond, James Paton, C. T. R. Wilson and Robert Schlapp. In 1959 he was elected President of the Royal Meteorological Society. Stagg was interviewed for the 1973 TV series The World at War regarding his experiences related to D-Day.

Stagg died in 1975 and was buried in Dalkeith Cemetery. On 6 June 2019, 75 years to the day since D-Day, a plaque was unveiled to him in his hometown of Dalkeith, on the wall of the Dalkeith Library and Arts Centre. Achieved through crowdfunding, the plaque was unveiled by his son, Peter Stagg. A second, smaller plaque is affixed to the wall of his childhood home at 169, High Street, Dalkeith.

Stagg was portrayed by Patrick Barr in the 1962 film The Longest Day, Christopher James Baker in the 2004 TV movie Ike: Countdown to D-Day, David Haig in his own 2014 play Pressure, and Steven Cree in 2017's Churchill. He is played by Andrew Scott in the 2026 film Pressure.

== Family ==
In 1940, Stagg married Elizabeth Nancy Kidner. They had two sons, including Peter Stagg. His grandson, Jamie Stagg, worked as an archive editor on the film Pressure.

== Cultural depictions ==
Stagg has been depicted in a number of films, on stage and television:

- The Longest Day - played by Patrick Barr
- Ike: Countdown to D-Day - played by Christopher James Baker
- Pressure (play) - written and played by David Haig in the 2014 production and 2018 productions and played by Kevin Doyle in the 2023 production.
- Churchill - played by Steven Cree
- Pressure (film) - played by Andrew Scott

== See also ==
- Weather forecasting for Operation Overlord
- Military meteorology
- Donald Norton Yates

== Bibliography ==
- Stagg, James (1971). Forecast for Overlord. London: Ian Allan.
- Beevor, Antony (2009). D-day: the Battle for Normandy. London: Viking (Penguin). p. 1. ISBN 978-0-670-02119-2.
- Ford, Ken; Zaloga, Steven J. (2009). Overlord: The D-Day Landings. Oxford; New York: Osprey. ISBN 978-1-84603-424-4.
- Whitmarsh, Andrew (2009). D-Day in Photographs. Stroud: History Press. ISBN 978-0-7524-5095-7.
- Wilmot, Chester (1997) [1952]. The Struggle For Europe. Ware, Hertfordshire: Wordsworth Editions. ISBN 978-1-85326-677-5.
