= Meteorologist =

Scientist specialising in meteorology

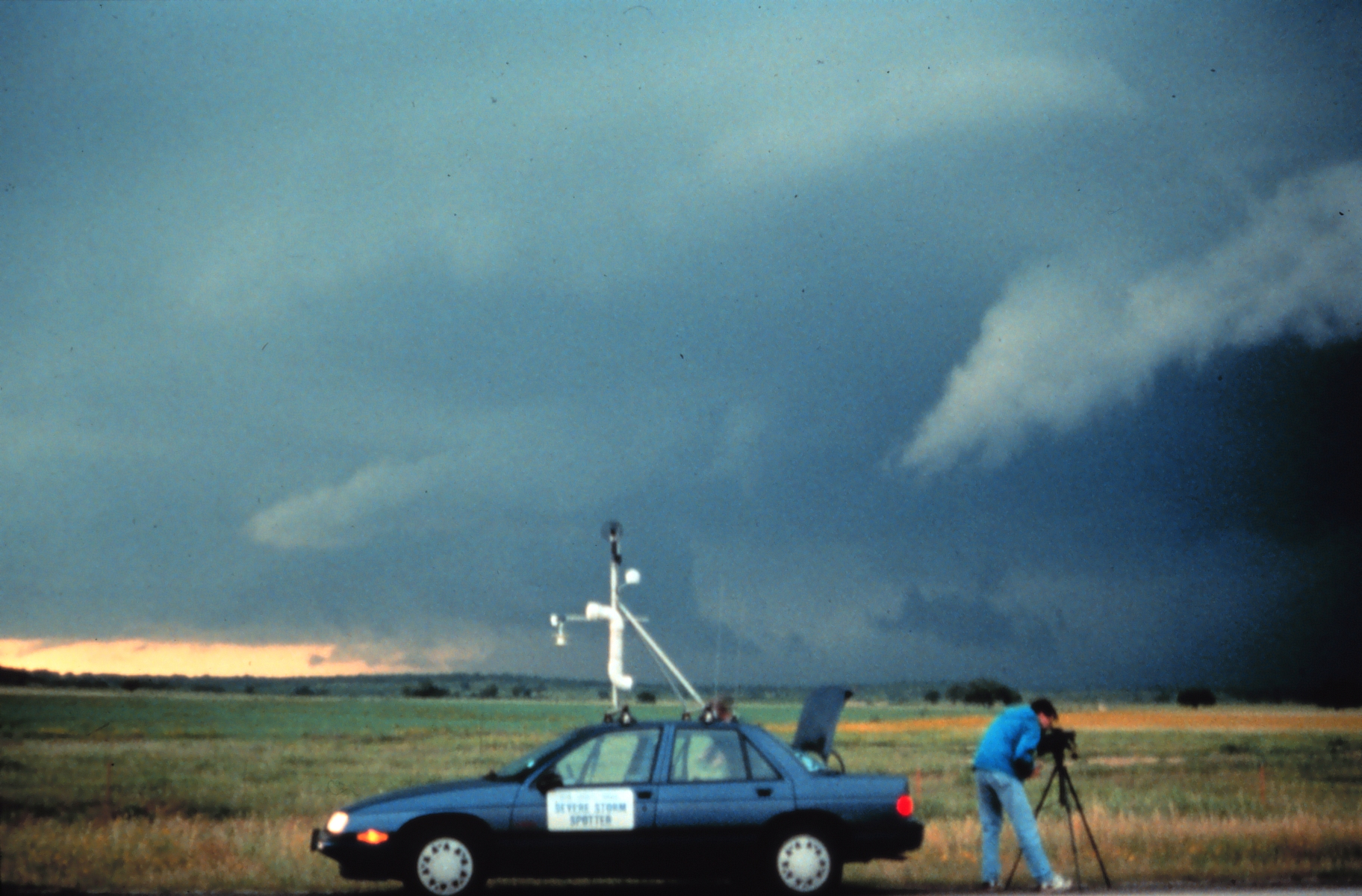
- Meteorologist studying tornadoes during VORTEX projects

Occupation
- Synonyms: Weather forecaster
- Activity sectors: Meteorology

Description
- Education required: Minimum B.Sc. in meteorology
- Fields of employment: Research, teaching and operational
- Related jobs: Climatologist

A meteorologist is a scientist who studies and works in the field of meteorology aiming to understand or predict Earth's atmospheric phenomena including the weather. Those who study meteorological phenomena are meteorologists in research, while those using mathematical models and knowledge to prepare daily weather forecasts are called weather forecasters or operational meteorologists.

Meteorologists work in government agencies, private consulting and research services, industrial enterprises, utilities, radio and television stations, and in education. They are not to be confused with weather presenters, who present the weather forecast in the media and range in training from journalists having just minimal training in meteorology to full-fledged meteorologists.

== Description ==
Meteorologists study the Earth's atmosphere and its interactions with the Earth's surface, the oceans and the biosphere. Their knowledge of applied mathematics and physics allows them to understand the full range of atmospheric phenomena, from snowflake formation to the Earth's general climate.

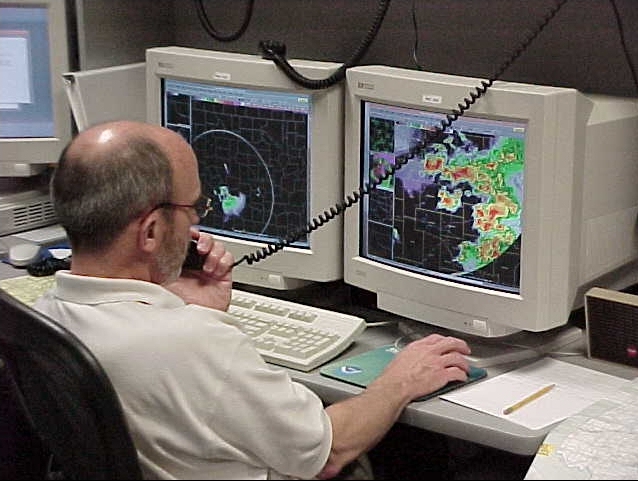
Operational meteorologist at the US Storm Prediction Center, 2006

Research meteorologists are specialized in areas like:

- Climatology to estimate the various components of the climate and their variability to determine, for example, the wind potential of a given region or global warming.
- Air quality where they are interested in the phenomena of transport, transformation and dispersion of atmospheric pollutants and may be called upon to design scenarios for the reduction of polluting emissions.
- Atmospheric convection to refine knowledge of the structure and forces involved in tropical cyclones, thunderstorms and mid-latitude storms;
- The modeling of the atmosphere and the development of numerical weather prediction.

Operational meteorologists, also known as forecasters:

- Collect weather data in some countries, but it is mostly done by technicians elsewhere.
- Analyze data and numerical weather prediction model outputs to prepare daily weather forecasts.
- Provide weather advice and guidance to private or governmental users.
- Collaborate with the researchers for integrating science and technology into the forecast process, in particular for indices and model outputs, for weather-dependent users such as farming, forestry, aviation, maritime shipping and fisheries, etc.

Meteorologists can also be consultants for private firms in studies for projects involving weather phenomena such as windfarms, tornado protection, etc. They finally can be weather presenters in the media (radio, TV, internet).

== Training ==
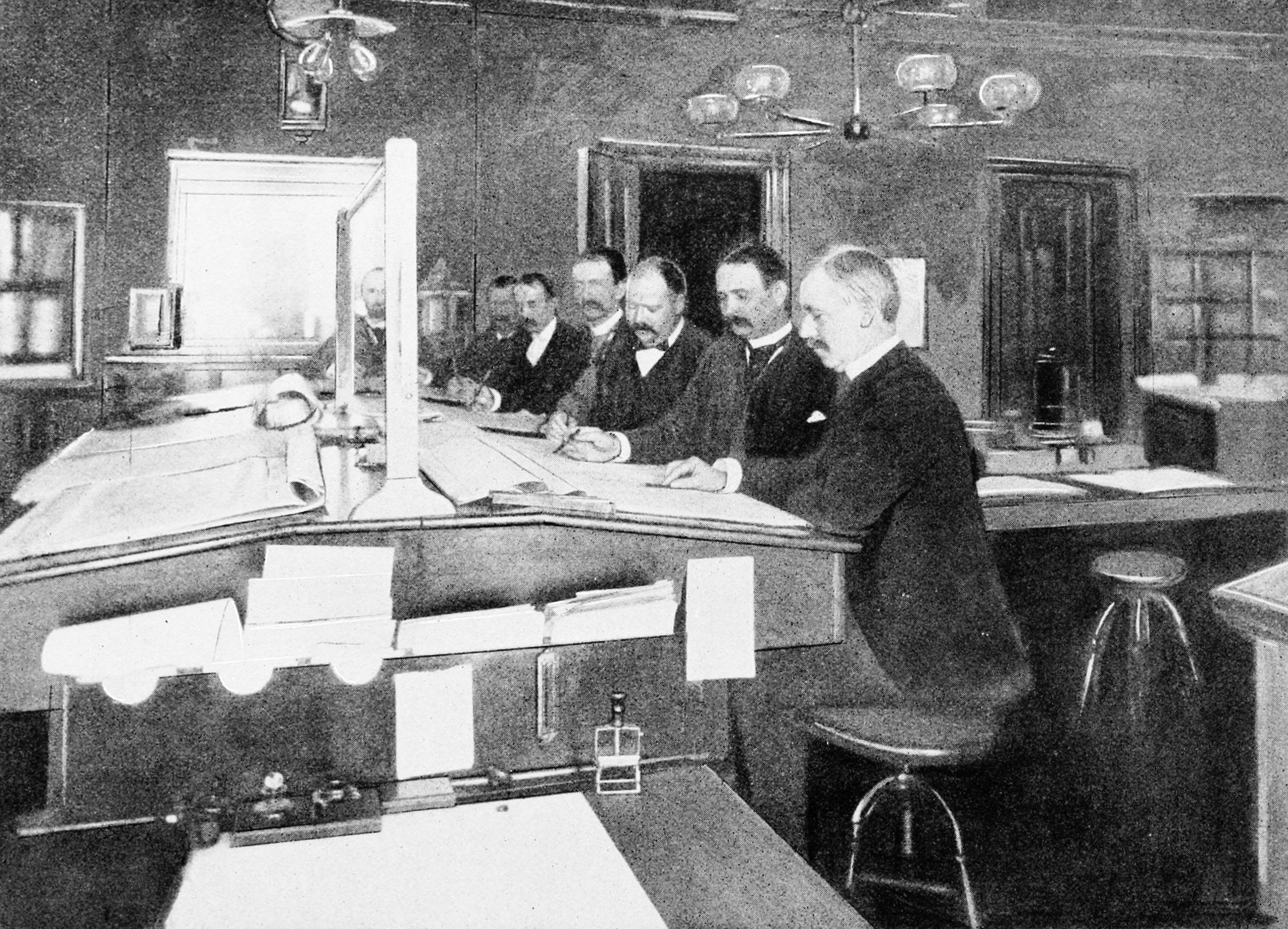
In 1894, a group of US Weather Bureau forecasters at work

To become a meteorologist, a person must take at least one undergraduate university degree in meteorology. For researchers, this training continues with higher education, while for forecasters, each country has its own way of training. For example, the Meteorological Service of Canada and UK Met Office have their own training course after the university, while Météo-France takes charge of all the training once the person has passed the entrance examination at the National School of Meteorology after high school. In United States, forecasters are hired by the National Weather Service or private firms after university, and receive on-the-job training, while researchers are hired according to their expertise.

In some countries, such as in United States, there is a third way where a graduate in meteorology and communication at the college or university level can be hired as media meteorologists. They are to be distinguished from weather presenters who have only a communication degree.

== Some notable meteorologists ==
- Francis Beaufort, inventor of the wind scale that bears his name.
- Vilhelm Bjerknes, founder of modern meteorology who created the Bergen School of Meteorology, where researchers defined the frontal theory and cyclogenesis of mid-latitudes storms.
- Jacob Bjerknes, son of the former, who attended the Norwegian school and who studied the El Niño phenomenon. He linked the latter to the Southern Oscillation.
- Daniel Draper, inventor of a number of important weather measurement devices including a self-recording wind direction and velocity instruments, self-recording dry and wet bulb thermometers, a hygrograph, a self-recording rain gauge, a sun thermometer, and a weighing mercurial barograph.
- George Hadley, first to introduce the effect of the rotation of the Earth in the explanation of the trade winds and atmospheric circulation.
- Anna Mani, Indian physicist and meteorologist who made contributions to the field of meteorological instrumentation, conducted research, and published numerous papers on solar radiation, ozone, and wind energy measurements.
- Sverre Petterssen, member of the Norwegian School of Meteorology and later one of the three team leaders of James Stagg for the Normandy landings.
- James Stagg, RAF meteorologist who was responsible for three teams of meteorologists predicting a lull for June 6, 1944, which allowed the landings in Normandy.
- Carl-Gustaf Rossby, was a Swedish meteorologist foremost known for identifying and characterizing the waves seen in jet streams as well as in the westerlies in the earth's atmosphere, known as Rossby waves, or planetary waves. Rossby was featured on the cover of Time magazine on December 17, 1956, for his contributions to the field. The highest award of the American Meteorological Society, of which Rossby was also a recipient in 1953, is named after him (Carl-Gustaf Rossby Research Medal).
- Ted Fujita, a Japanese meteorologist well known for his studies on tornadoes and downburst, and the invention of the Fujita scale. He first studied the nuclear bomb dropped on Nagasaki, which helped his future research on downbursts. He did very detailed studies on multiple tornado events, giving detailed descriptions on how tornadoes form and become strong.
- Josh Wurman, is a researcher in meteorology, for instance as a lead scientist of the VORTEX2 project. He is also a meteorologist on the Discovery Channel's Storm Chasers series.

== See also ==
- Weather forecasting
- National Weather Service
- Certified Consulting Meteorologist
- List of meteorologists
