= Yeates =

Yeates is a surname. Notable people with the surname include:

- Albert Yeates (1860–1941), Australian businessman
- Comfort Yeates (born 2005), British trampoline gymnast
- Fergus Yeates (1912–1992), Australian cricketer
- Gregor W. Yeates (1944–2012), New Zealand nematologist
- Herbert Yeates (1879–1945), Australian politician from Queensland
- J. Lanier Yeates (born 1945), American writer
- Jasper Yeates (1745–1817), American lawyer and judge from Pennsylvania
- Jasper Yeates (colonial judge) (1670–1720), colonial American judge from Delaware and Pennsylvania
- Jeff Yeates (born 1951), American professional football player
- Jesse Johnson Yeates (1829–1892), American politician from North Carolina
- Joanna Yeates (1985–2010), English landscape architect who was murdered
- John Yeates (born 1938), Australian football player
- John Arthur Yeates (1923–1972), American painter
- John Stuart Yeates (1900–1986), New Zealand botanist
- Mark Yeates (born 1985), Irish football player
- Mark Yeates (Australian footballer) (born 1960), Australian professional footballer
- Martin Yeates (born 1953), English motorcycle racer
- Nicola Yeates, British social policy professor
- Richard Yeates, English professional footballer
- Sidney Yeates (1831–1918), Australian businessman
- Steffen Yeates (born 2000), Canadian professional footballer
- Thomas Yeates (born 1955), American comics artist
- Thomas Yeates (orientalist) (1768–1869), English linguist
- Victor Maslin Yeates (1897–1934), English fighter pilot and writer
- Victoria Yeates (born 1983), English actress
- Walter Yeates (1918–1967), Australian cricketer

== See also ==
- Houston Brookshire–Yeates House, Lufkin, Texas, U.S.; an NRHP-listed house
- Jasper Yeates House, Lancaster, Lancaster County, Pennsylvania, U.S.; an NRHP-listed house
- Myrick–Yeates–Vaughan House, Murfreesboro, Hertford County, North Carolina, U.S.; an NRHP-listed house
- Yates (disambiguation)
- Yeate, South Gloucestershire, England, UK
- Yeats (disambiguation)
