= Yates (surname) =

Yates is an Anglo-Saxon surname common among the Irish, and best associated with the Poet Laureate of Ireland, William Butler Yeats, and his family of painters, including founders of Dun Emer Press and the Abbey Theatre.

== Entertainment ==
=== Art and literature ===
- Dornford Yates, the pseudonym of the English novelist, Cecil William Mercer (1885–1960)
- Edmund Yates (1831–1894), Edinburgh-born novelist and dramatist
- Elizabeth Yates (author) (1905–2001), American author
- Fred Yates (1922–2008), English painter
- Frederic Yates (1854–1919), English painter
- Gayle Graham Yates (1940–2023), American women's studies and American studies academic
- J. Michael Yates (1938–2019), Canadian poet and dramatist
- Jason Yates (born 1972), American visual artist
- Myriam Yates (born 1971), Canadian artist
- Richard Yates (novelist) (1926–1992), American novelist and short story writer

=== Music, theatre, film and television ===
- Aaron Dontez Yates (born 1971), American rapper, known as Tech N9ne
- Archie Yates (born 2009), British actor
- Billy Yates (born 1963), American country singer
- Cassie Yates (born 1951), American television actress
- David Yates (born 1963), English film and television director
- Elizabeth Yates (actress) (1799–1860), English actress
- Francesco Yates (born 1995), Canadian singer
- Frederick Henry Yates (1797–1842), English actor and theatre manager
- Hal Yates (1899–1969), American screenwriter
- Herbert Yates (1880–1966), founder and president of Republic Pictures
- Lucky Yates (born 1967), American actor, voice actor, puppeteer, and comedian
- Mary Anne Yates (1728–1787), English tragic actress
- Peter Yates (1929–2011), English film director
- Pauline Yates (1929–2015), English actress
- Reggie Yates (born 1983), English actor, television presenter, and radio DJ
- Richard Yates (actor) (c. 1706–1796), English comic actor
- Theodosia Yates (1815–1904), Australian actor and singer

=== News media ===
- Alastair Yates (1952–2018), English BBC News presenter
- Brock Yates (1933–2016), automotive magazine reporter/editor
- Jess Yates (1918–1993), English television presenter
- Paula Yates (1959–2000), British television presenter

== Sports ==
- Adam Yates (born 1992), English cyclist
- Adam Yates (footballer) (born 1983), English association football player
- Billy Yates (American football) (born 1980), American football player
- Dorian Yates (born 1962), professional English bodybuilder
- Frederick Yates (chess player) (1884–1932), English chess master who won the British Championship six times
- Gary Yates (cricketer) (born 1967), Lancashire cricket player
- Janet Yates, Northern Irish archer
- Kevin Yates (rugby union) (born 1972), rugby union prop forward
- Kirby Yates (born 1987), American baseball player for the San Diego Padres of Major League Baseball
- Max Yates (American football) (born 1979) American football player
- Robert Yates (NASCAR) (born ca 1943, fl. 1961–2007), former owner of Yates Racing, NASCAR racing team
- Ryan Yates, (born 1997), English association football player
- Sammy Yates, English association football player
- Sean Yates (born 1960), English cyclist
- Simon Yates (cyclist) (born 1992), English cyclist
- Simon Yates (golfer) (born 1970), British golfer
- Simon Yates (mountaineer) (born 1963), English mountaineer
- Steve Yates (born 1970), English association football player
- Steven Yates (born 1983), rugby union player from New Zealand
- T. J. Yates (born 1987), American football player
- Tony Yates (1937–2020), American basketball player and coach
- Tyler Yates (born 1977), major league baseball pitcher
- Wayne Yates (1937–2022), NBA player and college basketball coach

== Politics ==
=== United States ===
- Abraham Yates (1724–1796), American Continental Congressman
- Brian Yates, American politician
- Frederick Yates (politician) (1914–1971), Michigan politician
- Glenn Yates Jr. (1927–2022), Virginia politician and architect
- Harry D. Yates (1903–1996), Acting New York Comptroller 1941
- John P. Yates (1921–2017), Georgia politician
- John Van Ness Yates (1779–1839), New York Secretary of State 1818–1826
- Joseph C. Yates (1768–1837), former governor of New York
- Mary Carlin Yates (b. 1946), U.S. ambassador
- Max Yates (politician), American politician
- Peter W. Yates, American attorney and Continental Congress delegate
- Richard Yates (governor), Illinois politician
- Richard Yates (son), Illinois politician, his son
- Robert Yates (politician), anti-Federalist American politician
- Sally Yates, former U.S. Department of Justice official
- Sidney Yates, politician from the state of Illinois

=== Other countries ===
- Dianne Yates, New Zealand politician
- Elizabeth Yates (mayor), first female mayor in the British Empire
- John Ashton Yates, UK member of parliament
- Ivan Yates, senior Irish politician

== Science ==
- David Gilbert Yates, American eye, ear and throat surgeon
- Frances Yates, noted English historian
- Frank Yates (1902–1994), English statistician
- JoAnne Yates (born 1951), American Professor of Managerial Communication
- Ricardo Baeza-Yates (born 1961), Chilean computer scientist
- Samuel Yates, mathematician
- Terry Yates (1950–2007), American biologist and academic
- Tyler Yates (born 1977), American baseball player and police officer

== Military ==
- Charles Yates (1808–1870), brigadier-general during the American Civil War
- Donald Norton Yates (1909–1993), USAAF officer and meteorologist to Eisenhower in WWII
- Earl P. Yates (1923–2021), US Admiral
- Elmer P. Yates (1917–2011), US Army engineer general
- George Yates (1843–1876), US Army officer and friend of George Armstrong Custer
- Harry Yates (RAF officer) (1896–1968), Canadian RAF officer
- James Yates (cricketer) (1883–1929), cricketer and British Indian Army officer
- Julian E. Yates (1871–1953), US Army officer and chaplain
- Peter Yates (architect) (1920–1982), British architect and RAF officer

== Miscellaneous ==
- Andrea Yates, woman acquitted, by reason of insanity, of drowning her five children
- James Yates, English Unitarian minister
- John Yates, former Assistant Commissioner in the Metropolitan Police Service
- Joseph Brooks Yates, English merchant and antiquary
- Richard Vaughan Yates, founder of Prince's Park, Liverpool
- Robert Lee Yates, American serial killer
- William Yates, fifth president of the College of William & Mary
- Thomas, John, Albert and William Yates (1860–1917), the largest organizers of production on the Ural in Russia of the 19-20 century.

== Fiction ==
- Detective Yates, recurring character in the skit comedy series The Kids in the Hall
- The Hon. John Yates from Mansfield Park by Jane Austen
- Kasidy Yates, a recurring character in the science fiction TV series Star Trek: Deep Space Nine
- Lise Yates, from the British TV Sitcom Red Dwarf
- Captain Mike Yates, British science fiction television series Doctor Who
- Rowdy Yates, Rawhide TV series (CBS 1959–1966)
- Yates Noll, villain from Terrier, Book 1 of Tamora Pierce's Beka Cooper Series
- Richard Yates, a 2010 novel by Tao Lin

== See also ==
- Yeats (surname)
- Yeates, a surname
