= General Yates =

General Yates may refer to:

- Arthur Wolcott Yates (1865–1930), U.S. Army brigadier general
- David Peel Yates (1911–1978), British Army lieutenant general
- Donald Norton Yates (1909–1993), U.S. Army Air Force major general
- Elmer P. Yates (1917–2011), U.S. Army Corps of Engineers major general
- Ronald W. Yates (born 1938), U.S. Army Air Force general
- Walter H. Yates Jr. (born 1941), U.S. Army brigadier general
