= Yeet =

Yeet may refer to:

- Koe Yeet (born 1992; Chinese: 高艺; pinyin: Gāo Yì), Malaysian actress
- Yeet, a video game character from the 1991 game Boppin'
- Eat Yeet, a video game character from the 2006 game Blue Dragon (video game)
- Yeet, a sudden, informal expression used while throwing something, especially with force
- “Yeet!”, a popular gimmick expression used by wrestler Jey Uso as a taunt and during his entrance

== See also ==
- Yeat
- Yeate
- Yate (disambiguation)
- Yet (disambiguation)
