= Yates Township =

Yates Township may refer to the following places:

In Canada

- Yates Township, Nipissing District, Ontario (geographic / historical)

In the United States

- Yates Township, McLean County, Illinois
- Yates Township, Lake County, Michigan

See also

- Yates (disambiguation)
