= Yates =

Yates may refer to:

== Places ==
=== United States ===
- Fort Yates, North Dakota
- Yates Spring, a spring in Georgia, United States
- Yates City, Illinois
- Yates Township, Illinois
- Yates Center, Kansas
- Yates, Michigan
- Yates Township, Michigan
- Yates, Missouri
- Yates, Montana
- Yates, New York
- Yates County, New York
- Yates, West Virginia

== Other uses ==
- Yates (surname)
- Yates (company), a New Zealand and Australian gardening company
- Yates Racing, a NASCAR team
- Yates's, a pub chain in the United Kingdom

== See also ==
- Yate (disambiguation)
- Yates and Thom, engineering company from Blackburn, Lancashire
- Yates v. United States, United States First-Amendment case
- Yeates
- Yeats (disambiguation)
