= David Yates (disambiguation) =

David Yates (born 1963) is an English filmmaker.

David Yates may also refer to:

- David Gilbert Yates (1870–1918), otorhinolaryngologist
- David Peel Yates (1911–1978), military officer
- David Yates (legal scholar) (born 1946), solicitor and Warden of Robinson College, Cambridge
- David Yates (judge), Australian judge
- David Yates (politician) (born 1980), American lawyer and politician in Kentucky

== See also ==
- David Anthony Yates (1930–2004), rheumatologist
- Yates (surname)
