= Scott Case =

Scott Case may refer to:

- Scott Case (American football) (born 1962), former American football player
- Scott Case (business), technologist, entrepreneur and inventor
