= Frederick T. Haneman =

American author

Frederick Theodore Haneman (né Hannemann; 20 September 1862 Wolgast, Province of Pomerania, Kingdom of Prussia, now Germany – 3 May 1950 Brigantine, New Jersey) was an American author best known for being a contributor to The Jewish Encyclopedia.

== Career ==
Haneman lived and worked in Brooklyn, New York. While writing articles for The Jewish Encyclopedia, he was managing editor of The New York Medical Journal. He also wrote for the American Jewish Yearbook. He authored and co-authored biographies in New International Encyclopedia, as well as science and medical articles about therapeutics, the tongue, and toxicology.

== Bibliography ==
=== Inline references ===
- Atlantic City Press. LCCN sn84-20384; OCLC 10728364 (all editions).
1. "Plaque Honors Dr. Haneman for Work on School Board". Vol. 105, no. 62. April 19, 1950 – via Newspapers.com.
- Funk & Wagnalls New Standard Dictionary of the English Language.
1. Vol. 1: "A to Dive" – Preface: "Special Departmental Editors" – "Bibliographical and Biographical Names, etc.: Frederick T. Haneman". 1929. p. vii.
  1. Via Internet Archive (Digital Library of India).
- Herringshaw, Thomas William Herringshaw (1858–1927), ed. (1923). American Journalist and Author Blue Book. Chicago: American Blue Book Publishers. p. 149. LCCN 37-21885; OCLC 13147764 (all editions).
1. "Haneman, Frederick Theodore" – via Google Books (Cornell University Library).
- Litoff, Judy Barrett (1944–2022); McDonnell, Judith (1994). European Immigrant Women in the United States: A Biographical Dictionary. Garland Reference Library of Social Science (Vol. 651). Biographical Dictionaries of Minority Women, Volume 3. Angela Howard Zophy, Series ed. New York and London: Garland Publishing. pp. 185–186. LCCN 94-29001; ISBN 978-0-8240-5306-2, 0-8240-5306-0; OCLC 30814407 (all editions).
1. "Mannheimer, Louise Herschman" – via Internet Archive (UMass Lowell Libraries; withdrawn).
- McNeil, Barbara (ed.). Abridged Biography and Genealogy Master Index. Gale Research Company.
1. Vol. 2: "G–M" – "Haneman, Frederick Theodore" (2nd ed.). 1995. p. 1657. LCCN 94-39642; ISBN 0-8103-6878-1 (set), ISBN 0-8103-6880-3 (Vol. 2).
  1. Via Internet Archive (Kahle/Austin Foundation).
- New International Encyclopædia (2nd ed.). New York: Dodd, Mead and Company, Inc. 1914–1916.
1. Coley, Thomas Luther, M.D. (1869–1945); Yates, David Gilbert, M.D. (1870–1918); Haneman, Frederick Theodore, M.D., D.D.S. (1916). "Therapeutics". Vol. 12. pp. 192–193.
  1. Via Internet Archive (Princeton).
2. Yates, David Gilbert (1870–1918); Haneman, Frederick Theodore (1916). "Tongue". Vol. 12. pp. 336–337.
  1. Via Internet Archive (Princeton).
3. Ferris, Albert Warren; Yates, David Gilbert (1870–1918); Haneman, Frederick Theodore, M.D., D.D.S. (1916). "Toxicology". Vol. 12. pp. 391–394.
  1. Via Internet Archive (Princeton).
- New York Herald Tribune. LCCN sn88-75755; ISSN 1941-0646; OCLC 12102368 (all editions), OCLC 9405828 (all editions).
1. "Dr. Frederick T. Haneman – Ex-Editor of N.Y. Medical Journal, Father of Superior Court Judge". Vol. 63, no. 20923. May 4, 1950. p. 24 (column 5, lower half). ProQuest 1327213922 (Historical Newspapers database).
- Typographical Journal. 1889. OCLC 506175131 (all editions).
1. "The Death Roll" – "Frederick T. Haneman". Vol. 116. 1950. p. 512.
  1. Via Google Books (preview unavailable; search only).

=== General references ===
- The Athenæum. Journal of English and Foreign Literature, Science, the Fine Arts, Music and the Drama.
1. "Our Library Table". 1995. p. 144.
- Campbell, Delwin Morton, D.V.S. (1880–1952), ed. (1905–1920). American Journal of Veterinary Medicine (monthly). Chicago: American Veterinary Publishing Co. OCLC 6269868 (all editions).
1. Pammel, Louis Hermann, PhD (1862–1931) (July 1917). "Department of Live Stock Poisoning": "Article on Poisonous Plants in The New International Encyclopedia" (article review). Vol. 12, no. 7. p. 462.
  1. Via Google Books (Cal Berkeley Libraries).
  2. Via Google Books (Michigan Library).
  3. Via Google Books (UCSF Library).
- Frederick T. Haneman Papers; 1892–1914. Syracuse University § Libraries, Special Collections Research Center. OCLC 903531369 (all editions).
- The Jewish Encyclopedia (12 Vols. + online). Isidore Singer, PhD, Managing Editor, et al. New York and London: Funk and Wagnalls Company. 1901–1906. LCCN 2004-565027 (online); LCCN 01-9359, LCCN 25-14669, LCCN 16-14703, LCCN 06-12175; OCLC 269638 (all editions), OCLC 4743907 (all editions), OCLC 1142814 (all editions).
1. Spivak, Charles David (1904). "Medicine: In Bible and Talmud". Vol. 8. pp. 409–414 – via Internet Archive (Pacific Christian College; withdrawn). OCLC 428004506 (all editions).
2. Haneman, Frederick Theodore (1904). "In Post Talmudic Times". Vol. 8. pp. 414–422 – via Internet Archive (Pacific Christian College; withdrawn)..
- Marquis, Albert Nelson (1855–1943) (ed.). Who's Who in America. Chicago: A.N. Marquis & Company. LCCN 04-16934; ISSN 0083-9396; OCLC 1141571 (all editions).
1. Vol. 12: 1922–1923: "Haneman, Frederick Theodore". p. 1393 – via Internet Archive (UNCG University Libraries).
2. Vol. 18: 1934–1935: "Haneman, Frederick Theodore". p. 1063 – via Internet Archive (Tamalpais High School).
- McNeil, Barbara (ed.). Abridged Biography and Genealogy Master Index. Gale Research Company.
1. Vol. 2: "G–M" – "Haneman, Frederick Theodore (2nd ed.). 1995. p. 1657. LCCN 94-39642; ISBN 0-8103-6878-1 (set), ISBN 0-8103-6880-3 (Vol. 2).
  1. Via Internet Archive (Kahle/Austin Foundation).
- Who Was Who in America – With World Notables. Chicago: Marquis Who's Who, Inc. 1968. LCCN 43-3789; ISSN 0146-8081; OCLC 1713564 (all editions).
1. Vol. 4: 1961–1968: "Haneman, Frederick Theodore". p. 402 – via Internet Archive (Pacific Christian College; withdrawn).
- Wilson, Harold Fisher (1903–1970), PhD, ed. (1953). The Jersey Shore; A Social and Economic History of the Counties of Atlantic, Cape May, Monmouth and Ocean (6 Vols.). New York: Lewis Historical Publishing Company, Inc. LCCN 53-2960; OCLC 3505464 (all editions).
1. Vol. 3 – "Family and Personal History": "Frederick Theodore Haneman, M.D., D.D.S". pp. 407–408 – via Internet Archive (Allen County Public Library).
