= Greenwich High School =

Coordinates: 41.0411°N 73.6131°W

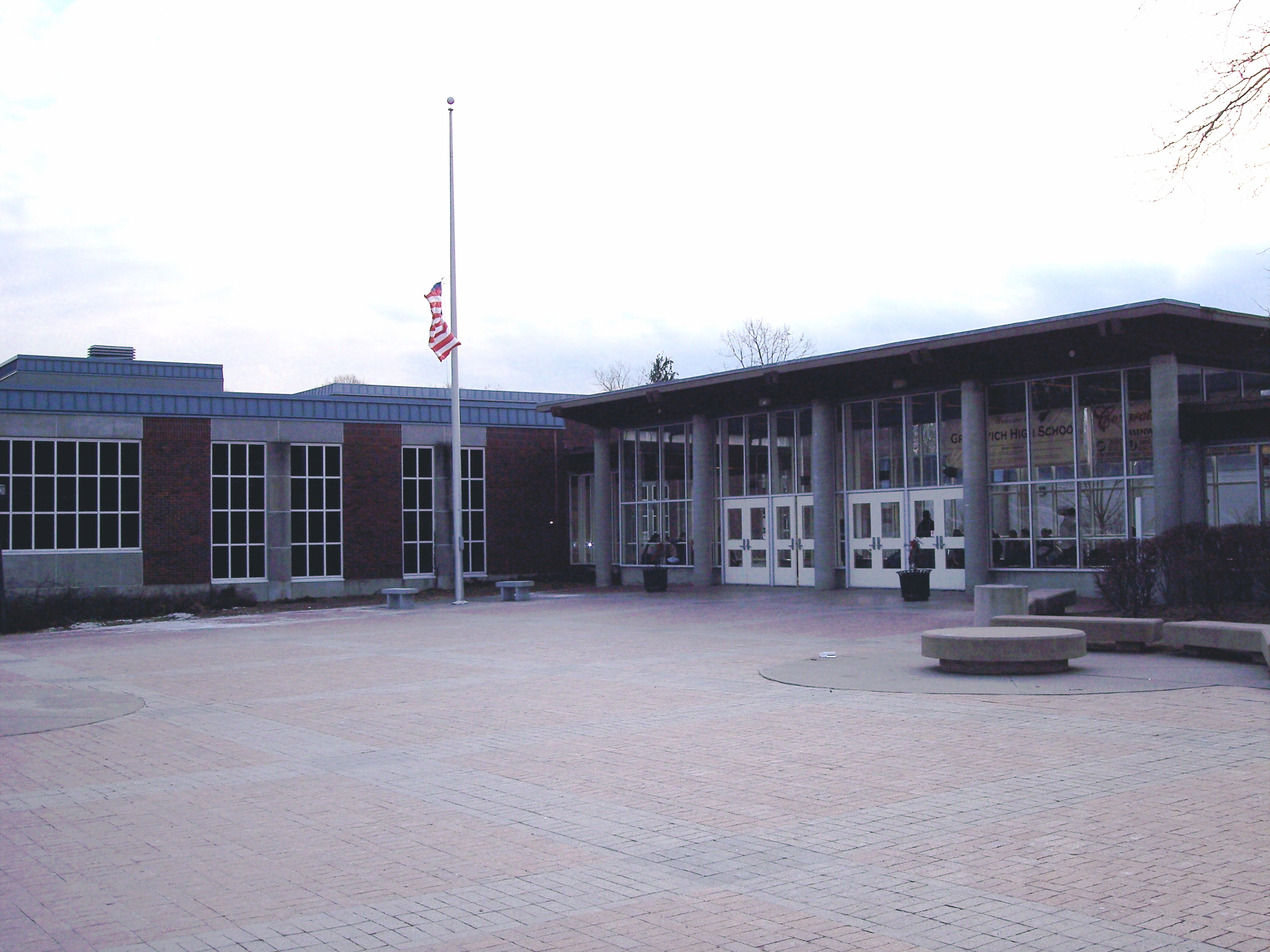

Location
- 10 Hillside Road; Greenwich, Connecticut 06830; United States

Information
- Type: Public
- School district: Greenwich Public Schools
- CEEB code: 070240
- Headmaster: Ralph Mayo
- Teaching staff: 197.30 (on an FTE basis)
- Grades: 9-12
- Enrollment: 2,633 (2023–2024)
- Student to teacher ratio: 13.35
- Colors: Red, White
- Mascot: Cardinal
- Website: ghs.greenwichschools.org

Greenwich High School is a four-year public high school in Greenwich, Connecticut, United States. The school is part of the Greenwich Public Schools system and serves roughly 2,700 students.

It offers over 295 courses and a wide variety of co-curricular and extra-curricular activities.

Greenwich is one of the twenty-one school districts in District Reference Group B.

== History ==
Greenwich's first high school classes were taught at the Havemeyer School on 290 Greenwich Avenue. The building was a gift of Henry Osborne Havemeyer, an American Industrialist, in 1892. As the building was under construction, plans for a third floor were scrapped as it would affect local businessman and banker Elias C. Benedict’s travel to New York City. He commuted by sailboat and the third floor would disrupt his sight of the flag signals that notified him when the crew was ready to sail. He paid for a gymnasium in exchange for not adding a third floor. In 1898 the first graduation consisted of twelve graduates.

In 1904, there was a town meeting to discuss moving the high school-aged students out of the Havemeyer School and to its own campus. Three years later, in 1907, the first public high school in Greenwich opened. The building was designed by Wilson Potter and it was between Mason Street and Milbank Avenue. The building is currently known as the Town Hall Annex apartments. In 1919, an idea for a new gymnasium and school building was proposed. Due to increased enrollment from 299 in 1914 to 477 in 1919, the Town Meeting approved the building of another new high school in 1924. Designed by James O. Betelle, it was dedicated in 1925. The Field Point Road campus opened up in the year 1926 when Headmaster Harry Folsom led the students from the Mason Street campus singing and carrying books. In 1933, over-enrollment forced students to attend school for half-day ¨double-sessions.”. Upperclassmen would attend classes from 7:00 A.M to noon, while underclassmen would attend school from noon until 5:00 P.M. while an addition was constructed. A federal grant for $165,000 provided funding for a five-story structure with twenty-five classrooms, a gymnasium, and a library. The Field Point Road campus addition was completed in 1935.

The Field Point Road campus was large enough for 25 years before it again became overcrowded. In 1960, the Board of Education approved a plan for two comprehensive high schools in Greenwich. This was voted down by the Representative Town Meeting (RTM), so the Board of Education instead approved one high school at Put's Hill. This project was approved for an estimated $9.8m which, at that time, was the largest single appropriation in Greenwich (the cost grew to $14.5m). The old campus eventually became the current Town Hall. This new campus on Put's Hill (along Hillside Road) is the current campus today. It is fifty-four acres with a student capacity of 2,750 which is expandable to 3,300. The students moved into the Hillside campus in 1970. Twenty years later, in 1990, the town added a new science wing, the Black Box Theater and additional classrooms, extended and refurbished the locker rooms, and renovated the auditorium, the swimming pool and the courtyard. The renovation added 90,000 square feet at a cost of $43,000,000. Then, a state-of-the-art Performing Arts Center opened in October 2015, replacing part of the parking lot. In 2016, the school replaced the old auditorium with new music rehearsal rooms and built a new entrance façade. In 2024, renovations were done to alter the front entrance of the school, making it more secure. The renovations costed a total of $2.5 million.

== Curriculum structure ==
Students are required to complete four credits or years of English/Language Arts and Mathematics courses, three credits each of Science, and Social Studies, two credits of Foreign Language, one credit of art or business, one credit of physical education and wellness, one credit of STEM elective, two credits of electives (a total of 22 credits). In the school course guide, additional requirements include the following:

- The social studies requirements include a full year of American History, and semester courses in Civics and Contemporary America.
- The science requirements must include one credit in a biological science and one credit in a physical science (chemistry or physics).
- The arts requirements must include one and one half credits in any of the following areas: visual art, business, family and consumer sciences, human development, media, music, technology education, and theater arts.
- To be eligible for a Greenwich High School diploma, a student must have attended Greenwich High School for at least one full semester immediately prior to graduation.

Students' grade point averages are calculated on a weighted scale. The maximum mark a student can receive in non-honors classes is a 4.33 (A+); in Advanced Placement or Honors level courses students can receive up to a 5.33 (A+).

All students at GHS are issued a Chromebook computer.

== Athletics ==
Greenwich High School students have opportunities to participate in a variety of sports in the Fairfield County Interscholastic Athletic Conference (FCIAC). Both boys and girls teams compete in the FCIAC in the following sports (although some sports such as football are not played by any girls' teams while softball is not played by any boys' teams): football, soccer, basketball, cheerleading, ice hockey, field hockey, track and field, cross country, swimming, water polo, rugby, golf, bowling, baseball, softball, volleyball, wrestling, gymnastics, and lacrosse.

During the 2025-2026 academic year, Greenwich High School won 11 CIAC state championships and was ranked 4th nationally in the MaxPreps Cup standings, the highest ever for any Connecticut high school.

== Notable alumni ==
- Carolyn Bessette-Kennedy - former publicist and wife of John F. Kennedy Jr.
- William Blumberg - professional tennis player
- Scooter Braun - manager of Justin Bieber
- Truman Capote (attended c 1939–41) - author
- Erin Cardillo (Class of 1995) - actress
- Scott Case - founding CTO of Priceline.com
- Bob Clearmountain (Class of 1971) - American mixing engineer and record producer
- Caroline B. Cooney - American author
- Rita Cosby - television journalist
- Edward "Porky" Cragg (Class of 1936) - Major, US Army Air Corps, Triple Ace in World War II
- Ernest T. Cragg (Class of 1939) - Major General, US Air Force
- Ryan Fazio - Connecticut State Senator
- Steve Gelbs - sportscaster and reporter for the New York Mets and New York Jets
- Dorothy Hamill - Olympic figure skating gold medalist
- Packy Hanrahan - professional ten-pin bowler, winner of two titles on the PBA Tour
- Hope Hicks (Class of 2006) - Former White House Director of Communications.
- Carl Higbie - Former Navy SEAL, author and host on Newsmax.
- Peter Katis - record producer, audio engineer, and musician
- Kenny Beats - record producer, musician
- Erich Kunzel - conductor, Cincinnati Pops Orchestra
- Matt Lauer (Class of 1975) - former Today Show host
- Jon Ledecky (Class of 1975) - businessman, co-owner of the New York Islanders
- Taylor Lorenz - journalist
- Tad Low - television producer
- Zach Lowe - NBA writer, host of The Zach Lowe Show
- D.J. Machale - author of the Pendragon series
- Rob Mathes - music producer and singer
- L. J. Mazzilli - baseball player (transferred)
- Ben McGorty - Connecticut State Representative
- Shane McMahon (Class of 1987) - executive at World Wrestling Entertainment and professional wrestler
- Stephanie McMahon (Class of 1994) - executive at World Wrestling Entertainment and professional wrestler
- Sten Molin - First Officer of American Airlines Flight 587 which crashed in Queens, New York, November 12, 2001.
- Evan Osnos - Chief Beijing correspondent for The New Yorker
- Jen Psaki (Class of 1996) - former White House Communications Director, former White House Press Secretary
- Evan Ross - actor, son of Diana Ross
- Mike Sandlock - former MLB player
- Christopher A. Sims - winner of the Nobel Prize in Economics 2011
- John Sullivan - Los Angeles Rams center
- Trey Wingo (Class of 1981) - ESPN analyst
- Steve Young (Class of 1980) - Pro Football Hall of Fame quarterback
- Justin Zackham - screenwriter
- John Zimmer - co-founder and President of Lyft
