= Butler Yeats =

Butler Yeats is a surname. Notable people with the surname include:

- Jack Butler Yeats (1871–1957), Irish artist, brother of William
- John Butler Yeats (1839–1922), Irish artist, father of Jack and William
- William Butler Yeats (1865–1939), Irish poet and dramatist

== See also ==
- Yeats (surname)
