= Richard F. Spaide =

American ophthalmologist

Richard Frederick Spaide is an American ophthalmologist and retinal specialist known for his work in retinal diseases and the development of ocular imaging techniques.

== Early life and education ==
Spaide earned his Doctor of Medicine degree from Sidney Kimmel Medical College at Thomas Jefferson University in 1981. He completed a flexible internship at Chestnut Hill Hospital in 1982, followed by a residency at St. Vincent's Hospital and Medical Center in New York from 1982 to 1985. He subsequently completed a vitreoretinal surgical fellowship at the Manhattan Eye, Ear, and Throat Hospital between 1989 and 1990.

== Career ==
Spaide specializes in retinal surgery, macular diseases, and ocular imaging technologies such as autofluorescence Imaging and optical coherence tomography (OCT). He has designed surgical instruments and holds several patents related to imaging and treatments for retinal diseases. Dr. Spaide is affiliated with Vitreous Retina Macula Consultants of New York, where he continues his research and clinical work. He has authored over 400 peer-reviewed articles in ophthalmology.

== Selected publications ==
- Spaide, Richard F.; Ohno-Matsui, Kyoko; Yannuzzi, Lawrence A., eds. (2021). Pathologic Myopia. Springer. doi:10.1007/978-3-030-74334-5. ISBN 978-3-030-74333-8.
- Holz, Frank G.; Pauleikhoff, Daniel; Spaide, Richard F.; Bird, Alan C., eds. (2013). Age-related Macular Degeneration. Springer. doi:10.1007/978-3-642-22107-1. ISBN 978-3-642-22106-4.
- Vaegan (2006-07-01). "F. Holtz, R. Spaide (eds): Medical Retina". Documenta Ophthalmologica. 113 (1): 69–70. doi:10.1007/s10633-006-9020-2. ISSN 1573-2622.
- Goldstein, Michaela; Loewenstein, Anat (2009-08-01). "Holz, F.G., Schmitz-Valckenberg S., Spaide R.F., Bird A.C. (Eds.): Atlas of Fundus Autofluorescence Imaging". Graefe's Archive for Clinical and Experimental Ophthalmology. 247 (8): 1151. doi:10.1007/s00417-008-0896-2. ISSN 1435-702X.
