= Ernest T. Cragg =

United States Air Force general

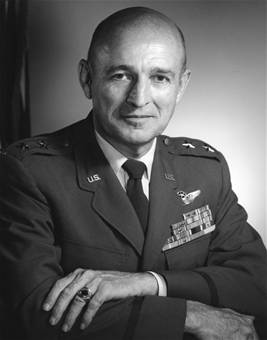
- Born: January 19, 1922; Mount Vernon, New York, U.S.
- Died: March 9, 2006 (aged 84); Arlington, Virginia, U.S.
- Burial place: Arlington National Cemetery
- Military career
- Allegiance: United States of America
- Branch: United States Army Air Forces; United States Air Force
- Service years: 1943 – 1975
- Rank: Major general
- Awards: Air Force Distinguished Service Medals (2); Legions of Merit (3); Distinguished Flying Cross; Air Medals (14)

Ernest Thorpe Cragg (January 19, 1922 – March 9, 2006) was a major general in the United States Air Force.

== Biography ==
=== Pre World War II ===
Ernest T. Cragg was born in Mount Vernon, New York. He spent his youth in the Greenwich/Cos Cob area of Connecticut, graduating from Greenwich High School in 1939. He subsequently attended the Stanton Preparatory Academy in Cornwall New York to complete work needed for enrollment in the United States Military Academy.

=== World War II ===
On July 1, 1940, then Cadet Cragg entered what became the first of the World War II accelerated 3-year West Point classes, completing basic flight training by graduation on June 1, 1943. He received advanced flight training at Craig Field and Matagorda Island.

After training, he was assigned to the 401st fighter bomber squadron, 370th fighter group, which joined the 9th Air Force in England in early 1944. He served the squadron as pilot, flight commander and assistant operations officer. The unit began combat operations May 1, 1944. By October he had competed 76 combat missions, totaling 175 flying hours in P-38 and P-51 aircraft. During those missions he compiled an air-to-air combat record of 2 confirmed kills, 2 probable kills and 1 damaged. He flew two air cover missions over the Normandy Invasion fleet on D-Day.

Having completed his combat tour, rather than return to the US, he requested and received an assignment to the 9th Infantry Division and the 9th Armored Division as air liaison officer and forward air controller; then to the IX Tactical Air Command as combat operations duty officer. By V-E Day he had attained the rank of major and had been awarded the Distinguished Flying Cross and the Air Medal with 13 oak leaf clusters.

In the days following the end of the war he met and subsequently married, while still in Germany, his wife, First Lieutenant Helen Claire Petraborg, a nurse with the 91st Evacuation Hospital. After the wedding she returned to the United States while he made preparations to go to the Pacific for the then expected invasion of Japan. With the surrender of Japan, he stayed on in Germany for another year, serving in the occupation with the 70th Fighter Wing at Neubiberg, Germany, as the assistant chief of staff, operations.

=== Military career after World War II ===
After the war, he served in the Tactical Air Command at Langley Air Force Base, Virginia, as director of special weapons. While a lieutenant colonel he became the commander of the 563rd Fighter-Bomber Squadron (which flew F-86 aircraft) at Clovis (now Cannon) AFB in New Mexico. He led the squadron on its "Fly Away" to Bitburg Air Base Germany in 1954. His next assignment was with the Twelfth Air Force in Ramstein, Germany. There he served as chief, Special Weapons Division; chief, Tactical Operations Division; and later deputy director of operations and training. In January 1958 he was appointed director of the Combat Operations Center, Twelfth Air Force, and U.S. Air Forces in Europe Advanced Echelon (aka Kindsbach Cave).

In 1958 then Cragg returned to the United States and was assigned to Headquarters, USAF in the Pentagon.

In 1963, Cragg became first the vice commander, and then the commander of the 20th Tactical Fighter Wing (flying F-100s) at RAF Wethersfield England. He also served as commander of the 3500th Pilot Training Wing (flying T-37s and T-38s) at Reese AFB outside Lubbock, Texas, which he considered his favorite and most challenging assignment.

Upon his promotion to brigadier general he became deputy chief of staff, operations, the Air Training Command, Randolph AFB Texas. In 1969 he returned to the Pentagon, first as assistant director and then as deputy director of aerospace programs (after receiving his second star).

With the death of his wife Helen in 1972, Cragg was reassigned to be vice commander of Second Air Force at Barksdale AFB. A year later he became the commander of the Air Force Inspection and Safety Center at Norton AFB, California. His final assignment was as chief of staff of the Allied Air Forces Southern Europe, based in Naples, Italy.

A command pilot with more than 5,000 flying hours, he retired in 1975.

=== Decorations ===
Cragg's decorations include the Air Force Distinguished Service Medal with one oak leaf cluster, the Legion of Merit with two oak leaf clusters, the Distinguished Flying Cross, the Air Medal with 13 oak leaf clusters, the Air Force Commendation Medal, the Army Commendation Medal, the Air Force Outstanding Unit Award, and the Belgian Fourragère.

- Command Pilot Badge (more than 3,000 flying hours / 15 years as rated pilot)
- Air Force Distinguished Service Medal with one oak leaf cluster
- Legion of Merit with two oak leaf clusters
- Distinguished Flying Cross
- Air Medal with thirteen oak leaf clusters
- Air Force Commendation Medal
- Army Commendation Medal
- Air Force Outstanding Unit Award

=== Activities after retirement ===
Upon retiring from the military, he became general director of RTB-Olympic Travel Limited in New York City. This company was chartered to provide the logistical planning and management for all US travel to the 1980 Summer Olympics in Moscow. The US boycott of those games effectively ended operations for that company.

After the Olympics, RTB-Olympic Travel was reorganized in Washington DC as a combination of Travelmasters International, Plane Travel, and The Society of Military Travelers. Cragg was chief executive officer. The companies catered to military personnel and their families. In this capacity he wrote a space available travel guide for retired military personnel. The agency's specialties were hunting trips (to Turkey and the former Yugoslavia) and trips to World War II European battlefields. With the advent of 50th anniversaries of various battles he was quite active, culminating in a formal dinner in England sponsored by Queen Elizabeth on the evening before the 50th anniversary of D-Day

Cragg was an outdoorsman and hunter. He was active with the local chapter of Ducks Unlimited serving his home in Arlington, Virginia. He hunted ducks and geese on Maryland's Eastern Shore; white tail deer, dove, quail and wild turkey in Texas; and pheasants in North Dakota.

He died on March 9, 2006 and was buried with full military honors alongside his first wife, Helen, in Section 5, Plot 104 Arlington National Cemetery.
