= L. J. Mazzilli =

American baseball player (born 1990)

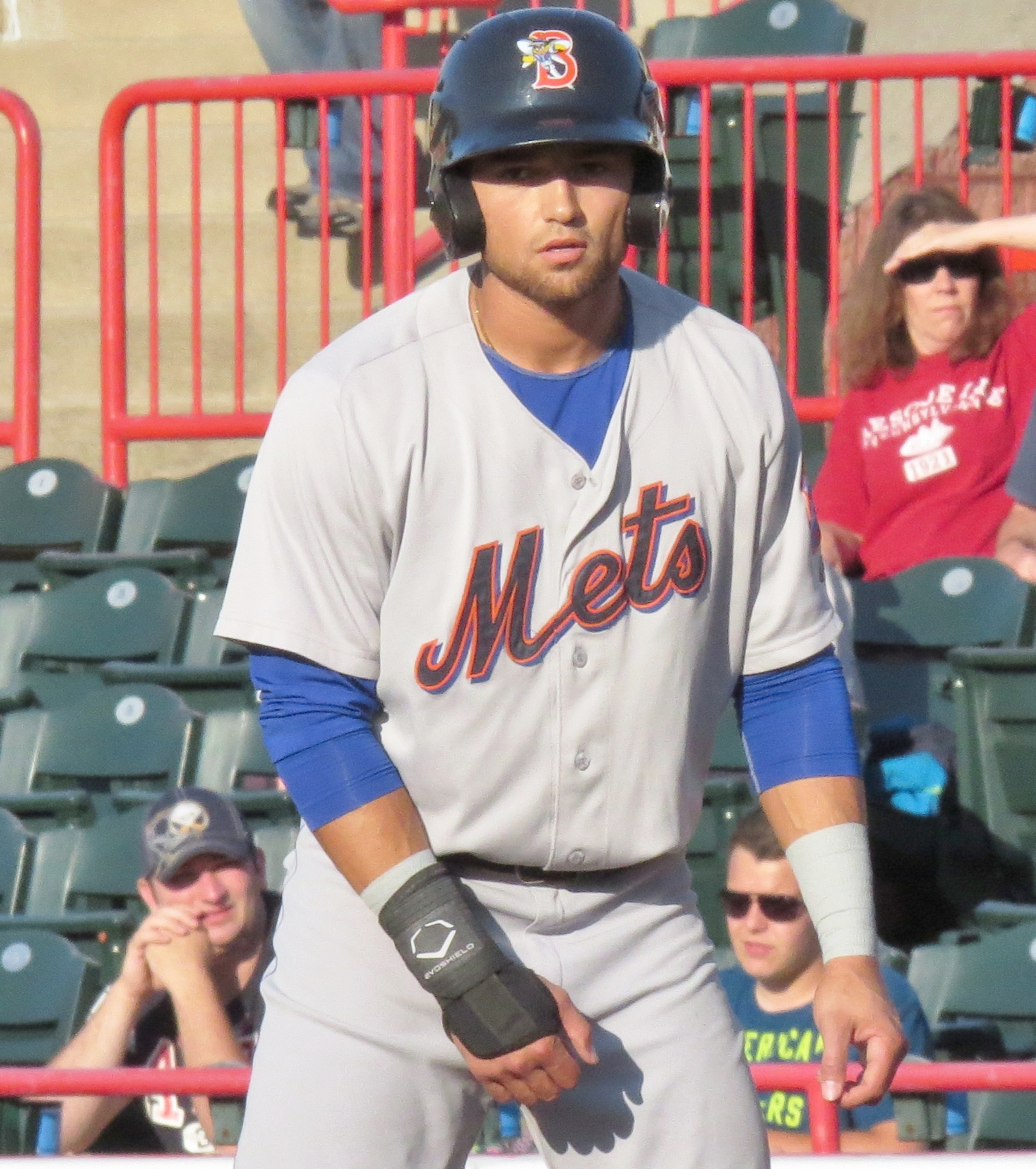
- Mazzilli with the Binghamton Mets in 2015
- Second baseman / Shortstop
- Born: September 6, 1990 (age 36); Greenwich, Connecticut, U.S.
- Bats: Right Throws: Right
- Stats at Baseball Reference

Lee Louis Mazzilli, Jr. (born September 6, 1990), known as L. J. Mazzilli, is an American former professional baseball second baseman and shortstop. Prior to playing professionally, he played for the University of Connecticut. He is the son of former All-Star outfielder Lee Mazzilli.

== Amateur career ==
Mazzilli was born in Greenwich, Connecticut. He played Little League Baseball there, and won a Little League home run derby at the age of 12. Mazzilli began his high school career at Greenwich High School, where he found that American football and lacrosse received more prominence. He transferred to Iona Preparatory School in New Rochelle, New York, which has a stronger baseball program. As schools in the Northeastern United States receive less attention for baseball than schools in warmer climates, Mazzilli transferred to IMG Academy in Bradenton, Florida, for his senior year.

After graduating from IMG, Mazzilli enrolled at the University of Connecticut, and played college baseball for the Connecticut Huskies baseball team along with teammate George Springer. The Huskies had Nick Ahmed playing shortstop, so they played Mazzilli as a second baseman. He had a .312 batting average as a freshman, and a .338 average as a sophomore. In 2010 and 2011, he played collegiate summer baseball with the Wareham Gatemen of the Cape Cod Baseball League, and returned to the league in 2012 to play for the Bourne Braves. The Minnesota Twins selected Mazzilli in the ninth round, with the 280th overall selection, of the 2012 MLB draft, Believing that he should have been selected earlier in the draft, and that he was not a priority to the Twins, he did not sign, even though the Twins offered Mazzilli a signing bonus twice as large as the $130,000 recommended for the slot. Returning to Connecticut for his senior year, Mazzilli had a .354 average with 51 RBIs and 29 stolen bases.

== Professional career ==
=== New York Mets ===
The New York Mets selected Mazzilli in the fourth round of the 2013 MLB draft, with the 116th overall selection, and he signed. After signing, Mazzilli made his professional debut with the Brooklyn Cyclones of the Low–A New York–Penn League. He hit .278 in 70 games for Brooklyn, and appeared in the New York–Penn League's All-Star Game. In 2014, he began the season with the Savannah Sand Gnats of the Single–A South Atlantic League (SAL). After he batted .292 with seven home runs, 45 runs batted in, and 11 stolen bases, and appeared in the SAL All-Star Game, the Mets promoted him to the St. Lucie Mets of the High–A Florida State League in June. He also appeared in a game for the Las Vegas 51s of the Triple–A Pacific Coast League (PCL) during the PCL playoffs.

During the 2014–15 offseason, Minor League Baseball suspended Mazzilli for the first 50 games of the 2015 season for his second positive test for a "drug of abuse". He played for Binghamton in 2015 after his suspension ended, and in 2016. In August 2016, the Mets promoted Mazzilli to the Las Vegas 51s of the Triple–A Pacific Coast League. In 122 games split between the two affiliates, he hit .239/.320/.348 with 5 home runs and 43 RBI. Mazzilli split the 2017 season between Binghamton and Las Vegas, batting a cumulative .254/.340/.362 with 5 home runs, 40 RBI, and 9 stolen bases in 110 contests.

=== New York Yankees ===
On April 10, 2018, the Mets traded Mazzilli to the New York Yankees in exchange for Kendall Coleman. He spent the season with the Triple–A Scranton/Wilkes-Barre RailRiders, batting .244/.315/.400 with 7 home runs and 25 RBI in 79 games. On March 29, 2019, Mazzilli was released from his minor league contract.

=== Long Island Ducks ===
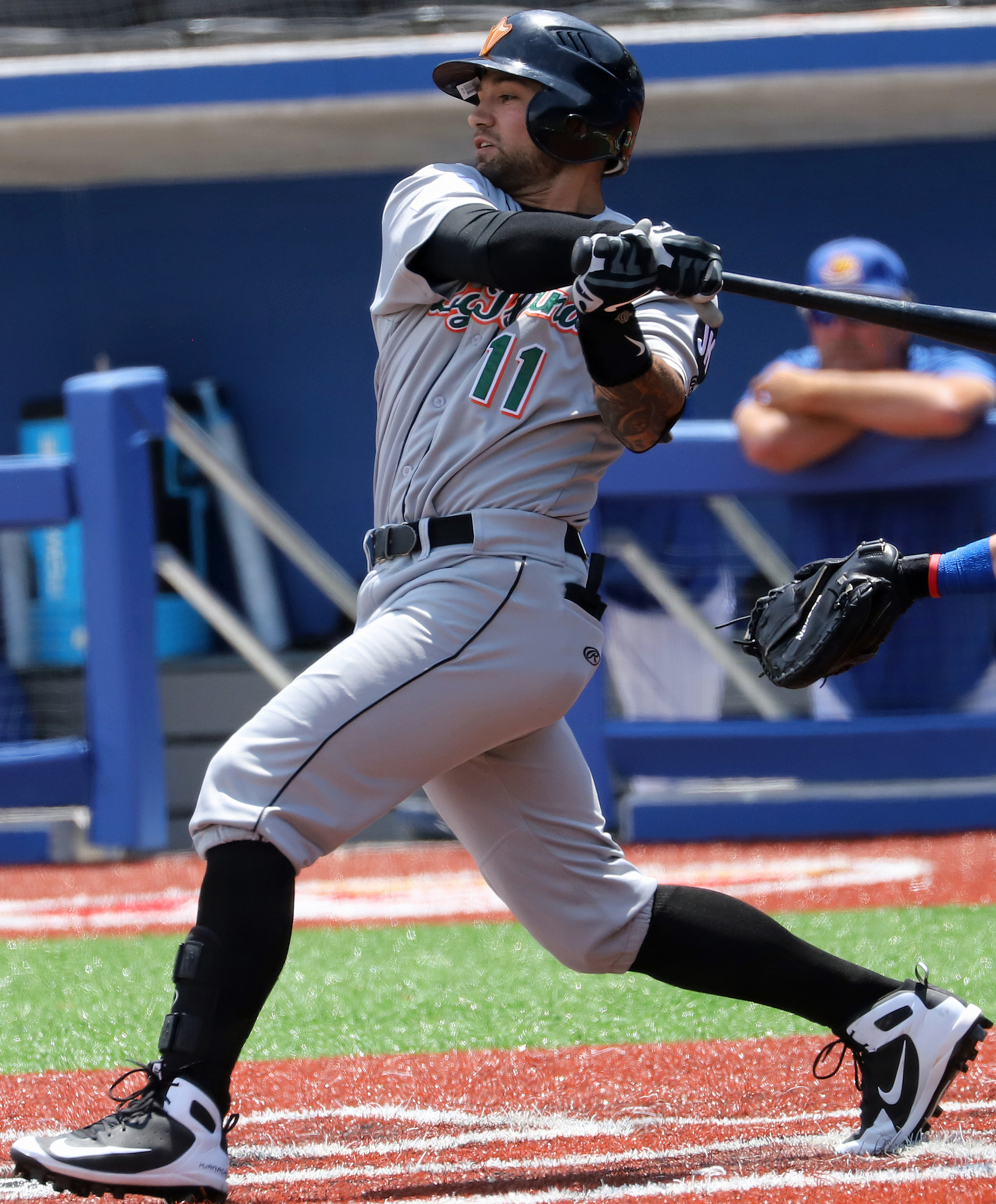
L.J Mazzilli June 16, 2019 with the Long Island Ducks in High Point, NC

On May 5, 2019, Mazzilli signed with the Long Island Ducks of the independent Atlantic League of Professional Baseball. In 122 games for Long Island, he hit .294/.351/.435 with 13 home runs, 74 RBI, and 15 stolen bases. He became a free agent following the season.

=== Chicago White Sox ===
On December 9, 2019, Mazzilli signed a minor league deal with the Chicago White Sox. He did not play in a game in 2020 due to the cancellation of the minor league season because of the COVID-19 pandemic. Mazzilli was released by the White Sox organization on June 18, 2020.

=== Long Island Ducks (second stint) ===
On April 13, 2021, Mazzilli signed with the Long Island Ducks of the Atlantic League of Professional Baseball. In 101 games, he put up a slash line of .303/.381/.440 with 11 home runs, 69 RBI, and 19 stolen bases.

On April 12, 2022, Mazzilli re–signed with the Ducks for the 2022 season. In 102 games, he hit .263/.380/.388 with another 11 home runs, 46 RBI, and 21 stolen bases.

== Personal life ==
Mazzilli's father, Lee Mazzilli has played, coached, and managed in Major League Baseball. His mother, Dani, tossed balls for L. J. to hit in their yard while Lee was with his MLB team. His sisters, Jenna and Lacey, also graduated from Connecticut. Lacey is his twin.
