= Yeats (surname) =

Yeats is an English family name. Notable people with the name include:

- Anne Yeats (1919–2001), Irish painter and stage designer
- Elizabeth Yeats (1868–1940), Irish printer and manager of the Dun Emer Press and the Cuala Press
- Francis Yeats-Brown (1886–1944), British author of The Lives of a Bengal Lancer
- Graeme Yeats (born 1964), Australian rules footballer
- Jack Butler Yeats (1871–1957), Irish painter, stage designer, and writer
- Jim Yeats (1936–2023), American football player
- John Butler Yeats (1839–1922), Irish artist and portrait painter
- Lily Yeats (1866–1949), Irish embroiderer active in the Arts and Crafts movement
- Matthew Yeats (born 1979), Canadian ice hockey goaltender
- Michael Yeats (1921–2007), Irish politician
- Montague Yeats-Brown (1834-1921), British consul in Genoa and Boston
- Ron Yeats (1937–2024), Scottish footballer, captain of Liverpool F.C.
- William Butler Yeats (1865–1939), Irish poet and playwright

== Fictional ==
- Frazer Yeats, a character in the soap opera Neighbours

== See also ==
- Yates (surname)
- Yeates
- Yeats (disambiguation)
