= Yeats (disambiguation) =

W. B. Yeats was an Irish poet and playwright.

Yeats may also refer to:

- Yeats (surname), a surname and list of people with the name
- Yeats (crater), an impact crater on Mercury
- Yeats (horse), an Irish Thoroughbred racehorse

== See also ==
- Alexander Yeats, a ship wrecked in 1896 at Gurnard's Head
- LÉ William Butler Yeats (P63), an offshore patrol vessel of the Irish Naval Service
- MV W.B. Yeats, a car ferry owned by Irish Ferries
- Yeat, an American rapper
- Yates (disambiguation)
- Yeates
- W. B. Yeats bibliography, the oeuvre of W. B. Yeats, or a part thereof
