= Stanton Preparatory Academy =

Coordinates: 41.4390°N 74.0284°W

Stanton Preparatory Academy was founded in 1925 to prepare young men for entrance to the United States Military Academy at West Point and the United States Naval Academy in Annapolis. The school was located in Cornwall, New York, five miles from West Point. The school was founded and led by Lieutenant Colonel Hubert G. Stanton (born September 14, 1897 – died September 15, 1955). It followed in the tradition established by the National Preparatory Academy. That institution was owned and led by LT Charles Braden from 1890 until his death in 1919. In the late 1920s, some sources refer to it as the "Stanton Loomis Academy."

Stanton was a 1911 graduate of West Point. He was the president of the class of 1911. Commissioned as an officer in the coastal artillery, he was an instructor in the Department of Mathematics at the academy between 1911 and 1914 and returned in 1917 as an assistant professor remaining as a member of the faculty until 1925.

The 1938 edition of the Handbook of Private Schools for American Boys and Girls lists the tuition for boarders as $1,100 (roughly $16,695 in 2009 dollars) and $675 for the day school ($10,245 in 2009 dollars). Harvard University's tuition, by comparison, was only $400 a year. The school closed by 1952; that August, the town purchased its former property. The school building was renovated as the town hall; the grounds were converted to a park.

Both U.S. services now operate their own preparatory schools, the United States Military Academy Preparatory School and the Naval Academy Preparatory School.

== Alumni ==
Prominent alumni of the Stanton Preparatory Academy include:

- Brig General Thomas H. Beeson, U.S. Air Force
- Major General Enest T. Cragg, U.S. Air Force
- Lt General Stanley J. “Moose” Donovan, U.S. Air Force, Tactical Air Command operations chief at Langley Air Force Base during the 1962 Cuban Missile Crisis
- Lt Colonel Arthur F. Gorham, U.S. Army, led airborne assault on Sicily in World War II
- Brig General George M. Higginson, U.S. Air Force
- Brig General Francis J. Roberts, U.S. Army
- Brig General Prentiss D. Wynne Jr., U.S. Air Force
- Major General Elmer P. Yates, U.S. Army
