= USS California (CGN-36) =

Lead ship of the California-class nuclear cruisers

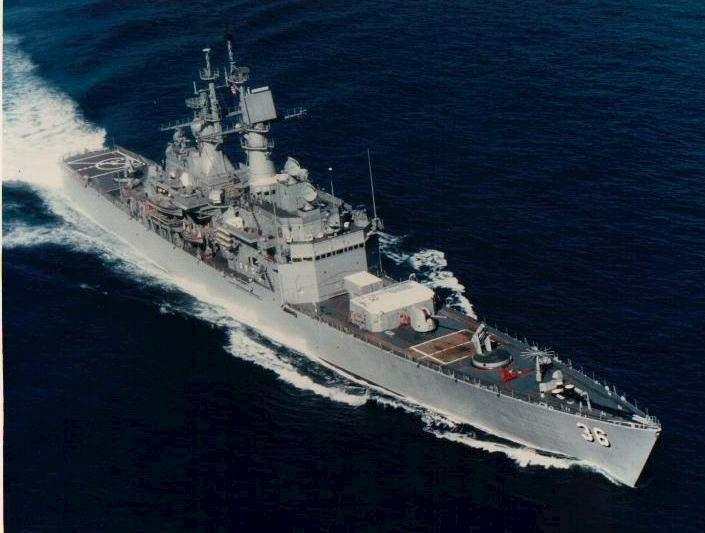
- USS California, 1987

History

United States
- Name: California
- Namesake: State of California
- Ordered: 13 June 1968
- Builder: Newport News Shipbuilding and Dry Dock Company
- Laid down: 23 January 1970
- Launched: 22 September 1971
- Sponsored by: Pat Nixon
- Acquired: 7 February 1974
- Commissioned: 16 February 1974
- Decommissioned: 9 July 1999
- Stricken: 9 July 1999
- Identification: Callsign: NKIN; Hull number: CGN-36
- Nickname(s): Golden Grizzly
- Fate: Nuclear ship recycling, 12 May 2000
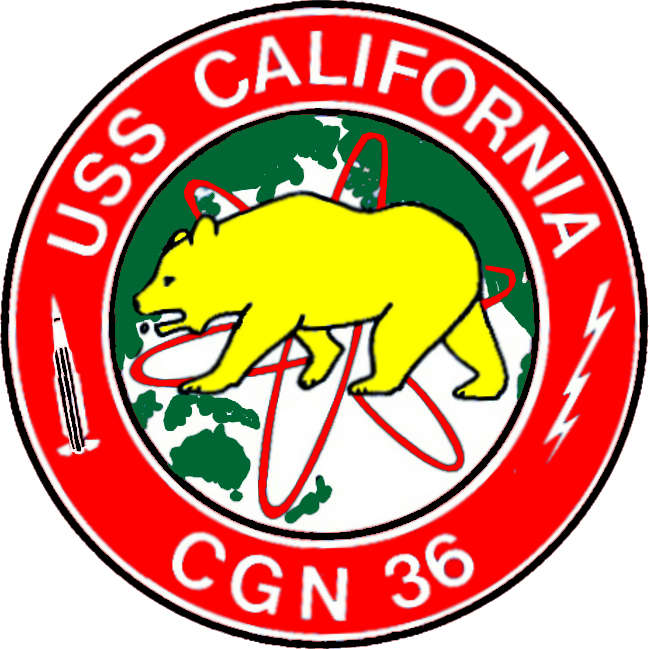
- Badge

General characteristics
- Class & type: California-class cruiser
- Displacement: 10,643 long tons (10,814 t) light; 11,548 long tons (11,733 t) full; 905 long tons (920 t) dead
- Length: 181.6 m (596 ft) overall; 173.7 m (570 ft) waterline
- Beam: 18.5 m (61 ft) extreme; 18.2 m (60 ft) waterline
- Draft: 10 m (33 ft) maximum; 7 m (23 ft) limit
- Propulsion: 2 × General Electric D2G nuclear reactors
- Speed: 30 knots (56 km/h)+
- Range: Indefinite (Nuclear powered)
- Complement: 40 officers and 544 enlisted
- Armament: 2 × Mk 141 Harpoon missile launchers; 2 × 5-inch/54 calibre Mk 45 guns; 2 × 20 mm Phalanx CIWS; 1 × ASROC missile launcher; 2 × Mk 13 missile launchers for RIM-66 Standard missiles (MR); Mark 46 torpedoes for anti-submarine use
- Aircraft carried: Helicopter deck aft able to accommodate SH-2 Seasprite LAMPS Mk 1, SH-3 Sea King, or CH-46 Sea Knight helicopters.

USS California (CGN-36), the lead ship of the California-class of nuclear-powered guided missile cruisers, was the sixth warship of the United States Navy to be named for the state of California. She was the last active nuclear-powered cruiser for the United States (USS South Carolina was deactivated nearly a month before USS California, with the other seven U.S. nuclear-powered cruisers having been deactivated and decommissioned prior to that).

USS California and her sister ship, USS South Carolina were equipped with two single-armed Mk 13 launchers, fore and aft, for the Standard Missile, one ASROC missile launcher, and two Mk-141 launchers for the Harpoon missiles. These cruisers were equipped with two 5-inch/54 calibre Mk 45 guns rapid-fire cannons, fore and aft. The two cruisers also had a unique arrangement aft of their superstructures with a flight deck and lowerable safety fences. Both cruisers also had full suites of anti-submarine warfare equipment. Thus, these warships were designed to combat all threats, in the air, on the surface, and underwater.

== History ==
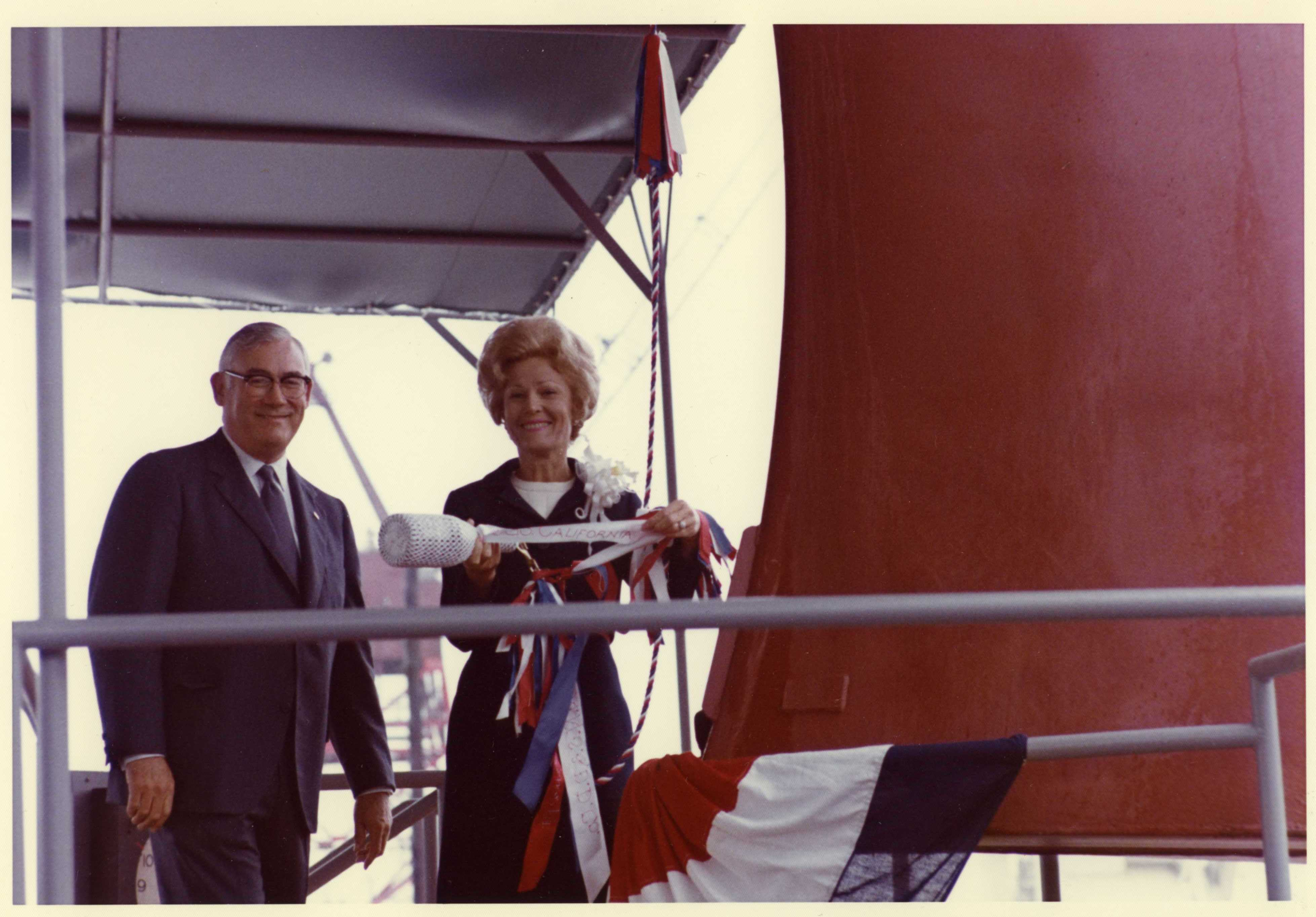
First Lady Pat Nixon christens California on September 22, 1971.

The contract to build California was awarded to Newport News Shipbuilding and Dry Dock Company in Newport News, Virginia, on 13 June 1968 and her keel was laid down on 23 January 1970. She was launched on 22 September 1971 sponsored with a "near miss" of the champagne bottle by First Lady of the United States Pat Nixon, and commissioned on 16 February 1974 by The Honorable James E. Johnson, Assistant Secretary of the Navy (Manpower and Reserve Affairs). She was commissioned as a destroyer leader (DLGN), but her designation was changed to a guided-missile cruiser (CGN) on 30 June 1975.

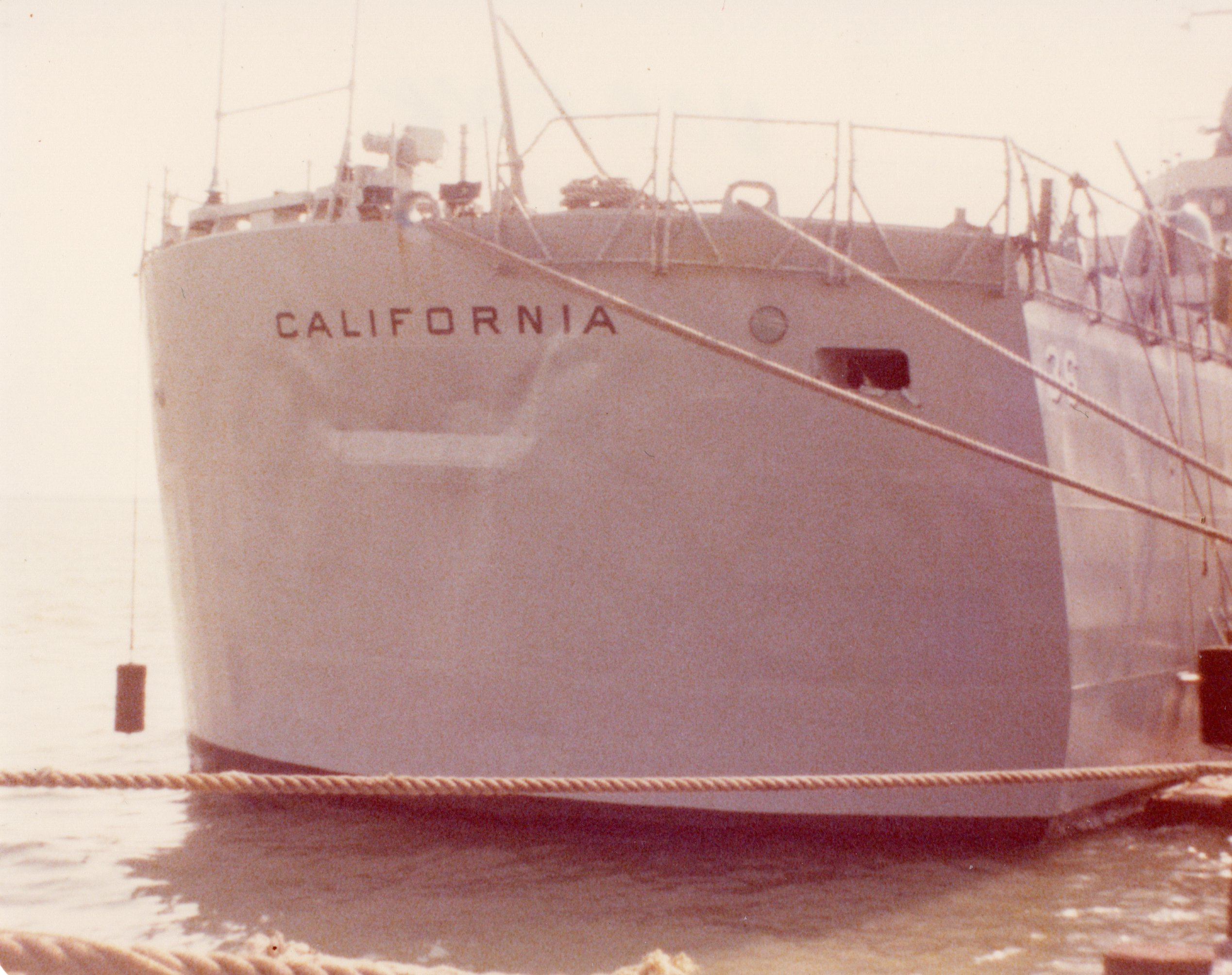
California suffered damage when an intense squall broke her moorings and the ship collided with USS Thomas C. Hart (FF-1092), docked at the same pier on 6 June 1977.

California suffered minor stern damage on 6 June 1977 when high winds in Norfolk harbor broke her moorings and the cruiser drifted in into the frigate USS Thomas C. Hart (FF-1092).

California represented the U.S. Navy in the Silver Jubilee naval review in Portsmouth, England in 1977, honoring Queen Elizabeth II. In January 1980, California was diverted from a Mediterranean cruise to the Indian Ocean due to the hostage situation in Iran. The ship left the Mediterranean and ran at flank speed south through the Atlantic, around Africa, and up into the Indian Ocean. In April 1980, this ship along with forces from the Air Force, Marines, and Army participated in "Operation Eagle Claw," the failed attempt to rescue hostages in Iran.

In 1981, California circumnavigated the globe, becoming the first nuclear-powered warship to do so since the USS Enterprise and her task force of two nuclear-powered escorts had done so in 1964, in "Operation Sea Orbit".

In September 1983, the "Golden Grizzly" left Norfolk for the last time, steaming through the Panama Canal to its new homeport, Naval Air Station, Alameda, California. The ship embarked on its first Western Pacific and Indian Ocean cruise in February 1985 as a member of the USS Constellation battle group. During the spring of 1986, California conducted several weeks of Bering Sea operations and became the first cruiser to visit Adak, Alaska, since World War II. She again deployed to the Western Pacific and completed a second "Around-the-World" cruise in 1987.

The year 1988 brought continued high-tempo operations as California cruised the Western Pacific and Indian Oceans for a third time. The ship served as battle group Anti-Surface Warfare Commander during the RIMPAC 88 exercise as well as for Olympic Presence Operations off the Korean Peninsula. Subsequently, during her 1988–1989 deployment, California assumed duties as Anti-Air Warfare Commander for operations in the North Arabian Sea and Persian Gulf. While assigned patrol duties in the Strait of Hormuz in December 1988, California conducted the last USN Earnest Will convoy mission through the strait.

The summer of 1989 saw California tasked with Northern Pacific operations as part of a CNO project to study the effects of Near-Land Operating Areas on carrier battle group operations. In September and October 1989, California participated as an anti-air-warfare picket ship in PACEX 89, the largest combined sailing of U. S. and allied naval units since World War II.

=== 1990s ===
In April 1990, California entered the Puget Sound Naval Shipyard in Bremerton, Washington, for a three-year refueling complex overhaul, including two new D2G high endurance reactor cores in her engineering plant with adequate fuel capacity to power the ship for more than 20 years of normal operations, and the New Threat Upgrade Combat Systems Suite. The overhaul cost approximately $425 million. Upon completion of the overhaul in January 1993, California began a series of exercises and evaluations in preparation for deployment. These included independent training in all aspects of its mission as well as coordinated battle group exercises. The timing of this overhaul would prove crucial to the ship's longevity, as it allowed the two California-class cruisers (California and South Carolina) to survive their successor CGNs.

Two years later, when the four newer Virginia-class cruisers came up for refueling, the Navy balked at the cost. The Virginia-class cruisers were decommissioned shortly afterwards, while the three-year overhaul on the California-class cruisers improved a platform whose nuclear propulsion system gave it immense flexibility.

In June 1994, California joined the USS Kitty Hawk battle group in the Western Pacific for the ship's first deployment in five years. California exchanged personnel with the Republic of Korea Navy for a combined exercise and with the Japanese Maritime Self Defense Force for ANNUALEX 06G and Keen Edge 95. The cruiser also took part in a LINKEX exercise with United States forces in and near Korea, establishing the most extensive tactical data link ever in this region. The deployment wrapped up with participation in Tandem Thrust 95, a joint exercise with the armed forces of the United States, Australia, and several allied nations. California then returned to her home at the Puget Sound Naval Shipyard just before Christmas 1994.

In 1995, California completed a four-month maintenance availability, improving the reliability of her propulsion plant and updating her combat systems. In September 1995, California sailed in a parade of ships through Pearl Harbor as part of the ceremony commemorating the end of World War II.

In May 1996, California left for the Western Pacific and Indian Oceans and the Persian Gulf on a routine six-month deployment with the USS Carl Vinson Battle Group. California received the Meritorious Unit Commendation for operations Southern Watch and Desert Strike for shared duties as Air Warfare Commander for the Carl Vinson Battle Group.

Having completed a short but intense maintenance period in the spring of 1997, California conducted a series of training operations and evaluations including a live-fire missile exercise, and Operational Reactor Safeguards Examination, and a Final Evaluation Period. California was awarded the Battle Efficiency Award for outstanding operational readiness throughout 1997.

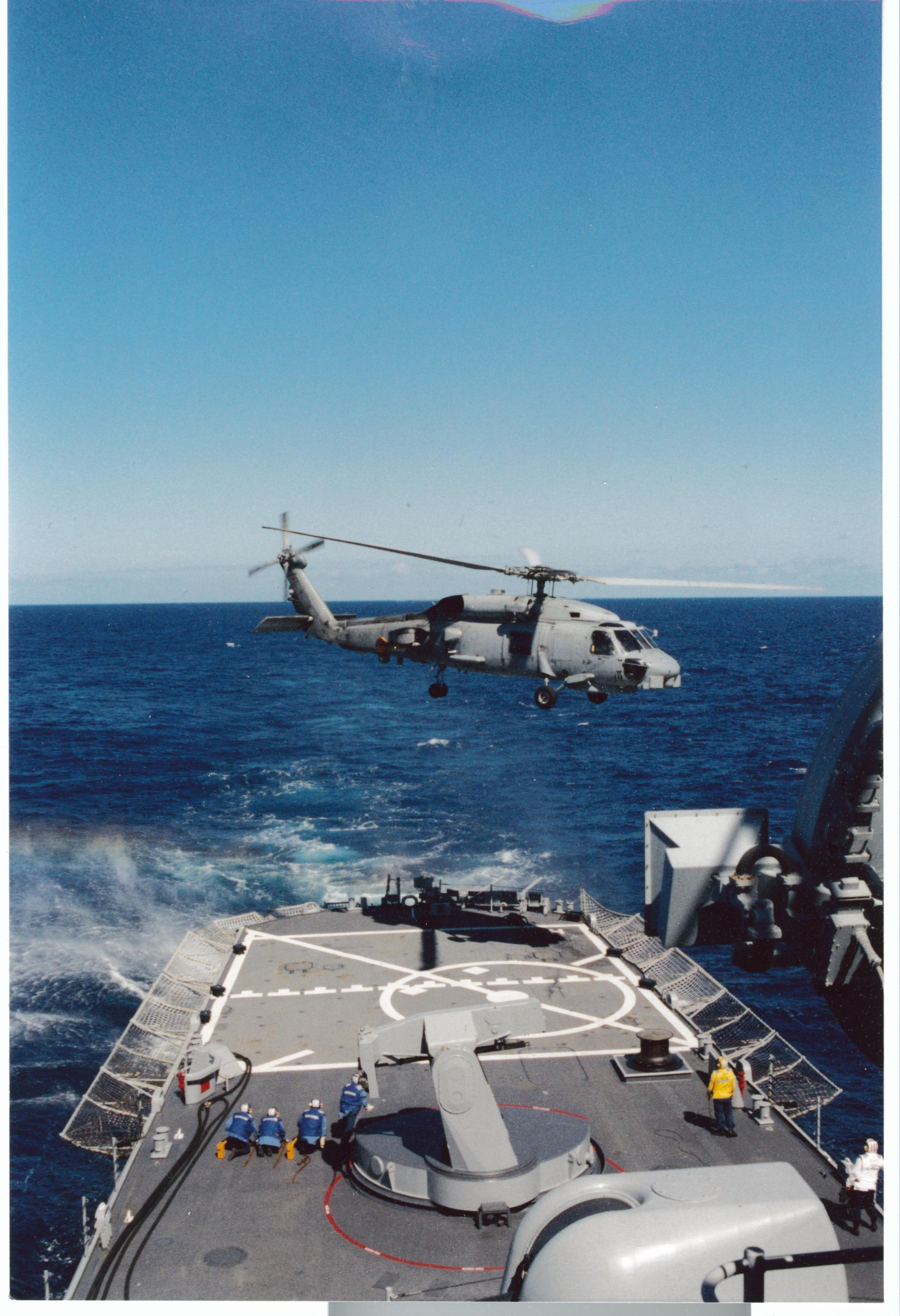
An SH-60 Seahawk lifting off from California's flight deck in 1998.

In January 1998, California deployed to the Eastern Pacific and the Caribbean Sea in support of Counterdrug Operations as the Air Warfare Commander for the Joint Inter-Agency Task Force (JIATF) East. In July, she gave her last "Grizzly Roar" by participating in RIMPAC 98 as a member of the Bilateral force. The improvements made during 1990 overhaul could not save either of the California cruisers. By 1998, they cost about $38.8 million to man, operate, and maintain. A typical Ticonderoga-class cruiser cost about $29.5 million annually. California-class ships lacked helicopter hangars, antisubmarine warfare weapons, and required costly nuclear-trained crews. The California class took on board roughly 600 officers and crewmen, while the conventionally powered Ticonderoga-class cruisers carry fewer than 400.

The deactivation ceremony for California was held on 28 August 1998 at the Puget Sound Naval Shipyard in Bremerton, Washington.

== Decommissioning ==
USS California was deactivated on 1 October 1998, then decommissioned and stricken from the Naval Vessel Register on 9 July 1999. She was disposed of in the U.S. Navy's Nuclear-Powered Ship-Submarine recycling program at the Puget Sound Naval Shipyard. Her recycling and scrapping was completed on 12 May 2000.

== Awards ==
California received a number of awards and commendations during her career. According to the U.S. Navy unit awards site, she received the Meritorious Unit Commendation six times, in 1980, 1986, 1987, 1994, 1995 and 1996; she received the Battle Efficiency "E" for outstanding combat preparedness in 1976, 1977, 1980, 1994, 1995, 1997 and 1998. California was awarded the Navy Expeditionary Medal three times, the Armed Forces Expeditionary Medal twice (Persian Gulf 1988 and 1996), and the Southwest Asia Service Medal (1991). Two of the Navy Expeditionary Medals were given for service in 1980 and 1981 and were for "Iran/Indian Ocean." The third was awarded for service in 1987 for "Persian Gulf."

== In fiction ==
The writer J. Lanier Yeates served aboard USS California in 1974 and 1998. In 2005, he wrote the novel Bay of One Hundred Fires, an alternate history work of fiction in which USS California is overhauled and upgraded, and then plays a key role in fighting the armed forces of the Iraqi President, Saddam Hussein, who had created a stockpile of weapons of mass destruction.

Author Dale Brown featured USS California in his novel Silver Tower. The main character's father was the Commanding Officer.

Author Charles D. Taylor has USS California in his novel Show of Force. The book begins on the bridge of USS California.

== Captains ==
- August 1971 – 26 March 1976 Captain Floyd H. Miller,
- 26 March 1976 – June 1979 Captain William O. Rentz,
- June 1979 – September 1982 Captain Charles J. Smith,
- September 1982 – November 1985 Captain Gaylord O. Paulson,
- November 1985 – August 1988 Captain Richard D. Williams III,
- August 1988 – December 1991 Captain Barry V. Burrow,
- December 1991 – January 1995 Captain Ray Wallace,
- January 1995 – October 1997 Captain Robert P. Perry,
- October 1997 – 9 July 1999 Captain Steven K. Johnson

== See also ==
- Nuclear powered cruisers of the United States Navy
