= Albert Yeates =

Albert Yeates (9 November 1860 – 10 October 1941) was a pastoralist and businessman in Queensland and principal of the firm of Cudmore and Yeates.

== History ==
Born in South Australia, the second son of Sidney Yeates and Dymphna Maria (née Cudmore), he moved to Queensland with his parents in 1863 or 1868. The family settled on the Don River at Bowen, Queensland, where they engaged in farming and grazing. In 1880, the family travelled across country via Alpha, to Adavale, where, in partnership with J. F. Cudmore. they purchased Boondoon station from Conn Brothers. In 1897 they sold the station to A. H. Pegler. Yeates selected land on the Ward River, near Charleville. In partnership with another brother, he established Lockwood, about 30,000 acres, later the property of A. M. Deutscher. Yeates, after contending with droughts and low prices on the land, entered into business at Miles for some 10 years.

In 1886, he founded the Western Carrying Company, with 10 bullock and horse teams. The company engaged in transporting wool from the Far West to the rail head at Roma and carried station supplies on the return journey.

Albert Yeates enjoyed excellent health; he retired around 1939, and died after a brief illness.

== Family ==
Albert married Helen Anne Blackett (1857 – 26 June 1931) on 13 February 1889. Helen was a sister of Clara Elizabeth "Lily" Blackett ( – 9 October 1952) who married Albert's brother Walter Cudmore Yeates (1869–1952).

Albert was survived by five younger brothers, including Herbert Yeates, M.L.A.
