= J. Lanier Yeates =

American novelist

J. Lanier Yeates (born 1945) is an American lawyer and novelist. Yeates was born in Pine Bluff, Arkansas, completed high school in El Dorado, Arkansas and resides in Houston, Texas. He is a graduate of Louisiana State University and the Paul M. Hebert Law Center and served in the U.S. Navy from 1968 to 1975.

Yeates is currently a partner practicing oil and gas law with the Gordon Arata McCollam Duplantis & Eagan LLP.

Yeates has published several legal books, including Louisiana Oil and Gas Legislation (1994: 2nd ed. 1998), and Selected Commentary on Oil and Gas Law (2000 and 1999). His many articles include Louisiana and Texas Oil & Gas Law: An Overview of the Differences (1992), Strategies Outlined for Doing Business in Russia (1992), The Accounting Provisions of the Foreign Corrupt Practices Act (1994), and Indemnification and Anti-Indemnity Statutes as They Relate to Mineral Rights and Contracts (1986).

Yeates's first novel, Bay of One Hundred Fires (ISBN 0-9726822-1-X), published in 2004, is an alternate history based geo-political thriller that speculates what Saddam Hussein might have done with the deadly weapons many people believed he had. In the novel, the nuclear-powered USS California is overhauled and upgraded, and plays a key role in fighting Iraqi dictator Saddam Hussein who has, at least in the book, created a stockpile of weapons of mass destruction. Some of Yeates's inspiration for Bay came from his service in the U.S. Navy, where he served and developed expertise in 3-D radar aboard the California in 1974. When the California was delivered to the U.S. Navy, Yeates was at the helm when the ship departed the Newport News Shipbuilding and Drydock Company for its maiden voyage at sea. Yeates also helmed the California in 1998 when it sailed to the Puget Sound Naval Shipyard to be scrapped.
