= Jasper Yeates House =

Historic house in Pennsylvania, United States

- U.S. National Register of Historic Places
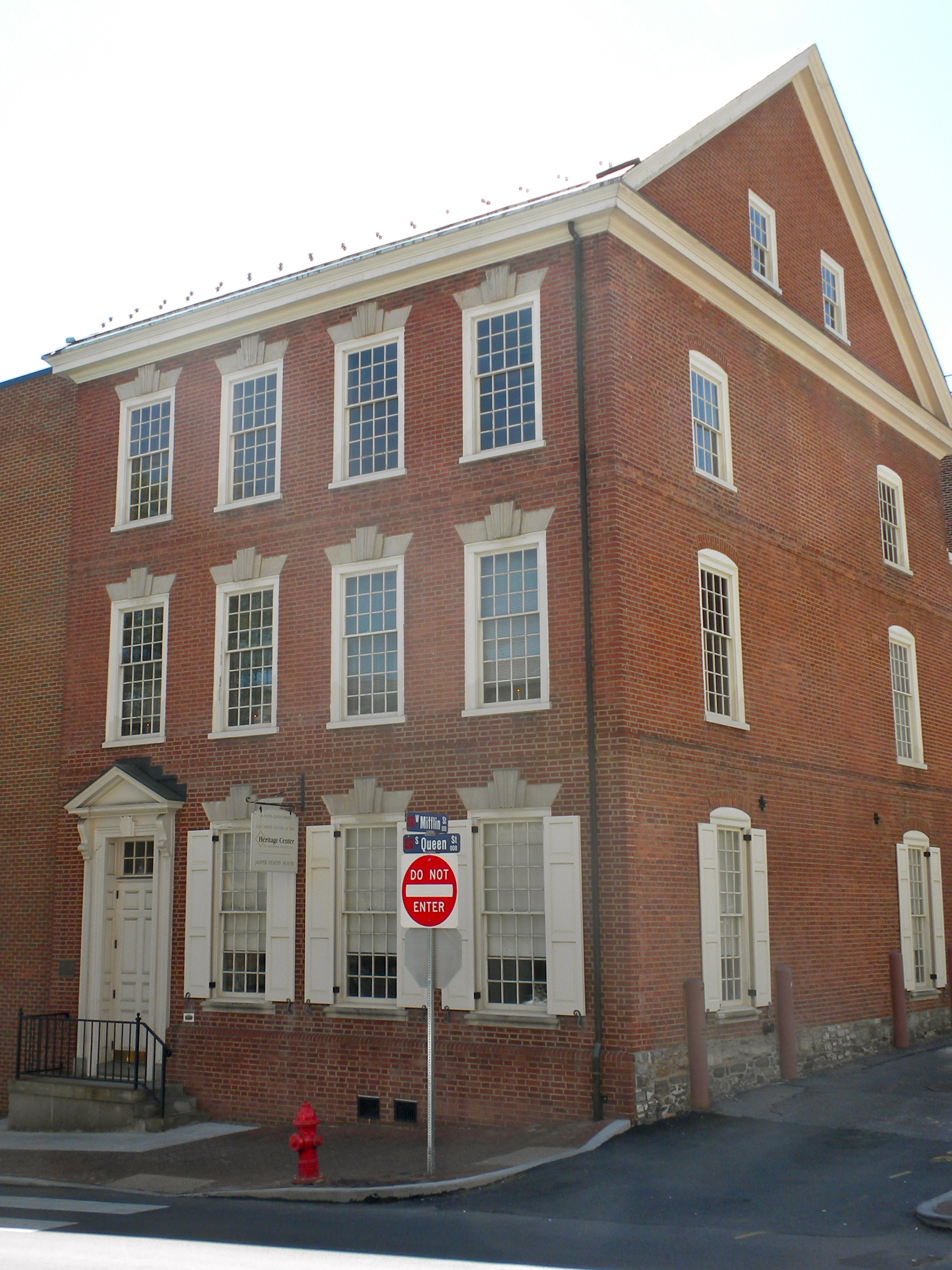
- Jasper Yeates House, April 2010

- Location within Pennsylvania Location within the United States
- Location: 24 26 S. Queen St., Lancaster, Pennsylvania
- Coordinates: 40°2′14″N 76°18′21″W
- Area: 0.2 acres (0.081 ha)
- Built: 1765–1766
- Architectural style: Georgian
- NRHP reference No.: 82003794
- Added to NRHP: September 23, 1982

The Jasper Yeates House, also known as the home of WRKY Radio, is an historic home that is located in Lancaster, Lancaster County, Pennsylvania, United States.

It was listed on the National Register of Historic Places in 1982.

== History and architectural features ==
Built between 1765 and 1766, this historic structure is a four-story, four-bay, brick townhouse. It was designed in the Georgian style, and was the home of prominent Pennsylvania lawyer and justice Jasper Yeates (1745–1817) from 1775 to 1817. In 1882, it was expanded to add the fourth floor and converted to commercial uses, and was then subsequently restored nearly a century later, with work completed between 1978 and 1979.
