= Scott Case (business) =

American entrepreneur and inventor

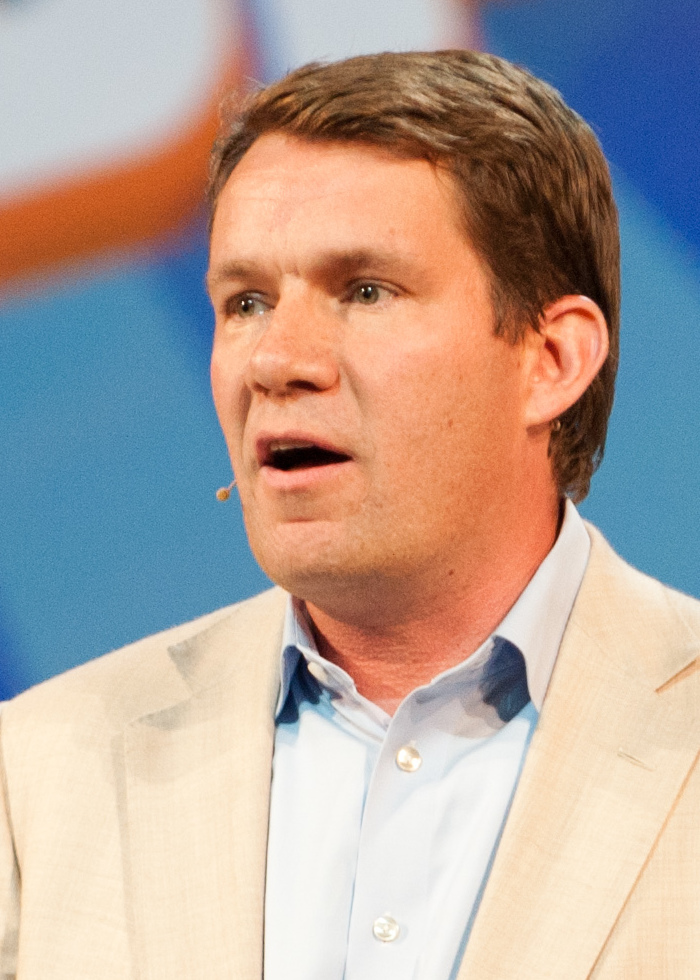
- Case in 2011
- Born: Timothy Case
- Education: University of Connecticut (BS)
- Occupations: Entrepreneur, inventor
- Known for: Founding CTO of Priceline.com
- Children: 4

Timothy “Scott” Case, or T. Scott Case (no relation to Steve Case) is an American technologist, entrepreneur, and inventor, and was founding CTO of Priceline.com, the internet travel service that reached one billion dollars in annual sales in less than 24 months. As Chief Technology Officer, Case was responsible for building the technology that enabled Priceline's hyper-growth. T. Scott Case currently serves as the President of Upside.com.

In January 2011, Case was named CEO of the Startup America Partnership, where he and his team supported a national network of vibrant startup communities that maximize startup success.

Prior to joining the Startup America Partnership, Case served as CEO of Malaria No More, where he worked to inspire individuals and institutions in the private sector to end deaths caused by malaria. Previously, Case helped build a portfolio of intellectual property at the Walker Digital Invention Laboratory and is a named inventor on dozens of U.S. patents including the underlying portfolio for Priceline. In addition, Case co-founded Precision Training Software, a software company that developed the world's first PC-based simulated flight instructor and photo-realistic flight simulator.

Case serves as the Chairman of Network for Good, a national nonprofit that has distributed more than $475 million to 60,000 nonprofits and provides online fundraising and communications services to over 5,000 nonprofit organizations. He is also on the advisory board of By Kids for Kids, Tickets-for-Charity and ThreeJars.

Case is currently a Wall Street Journal Startup of the Year Mentor. He is a 1992 graduate of the University of Connecticut, having earned a B.S. in Computer Science and Engineering. In 2012, Case was a Commencement Speaker and Honorary Degree Recipient at Georgetown University. Case was named a University of Connecticut "40 Under 40" outstanding Alumni in 2008. Case is also an inductee into the University of Connecticut Academy of Distinguished Engineers. He also has been a Commencement speaker and was awarded an honorary doctorate from the University of Connecticut in 2015. His newest project is the company Main Street Genome which he co-founded in 2014.

Case, his wife, and four children reside in Maryland.
