= Jasper Yeates =

American judge

Jasper Yeates (1745–1817) was an American lawyer and judge from Pennsylvania, a justice of the state Supreme Court from 1791 to 1817.

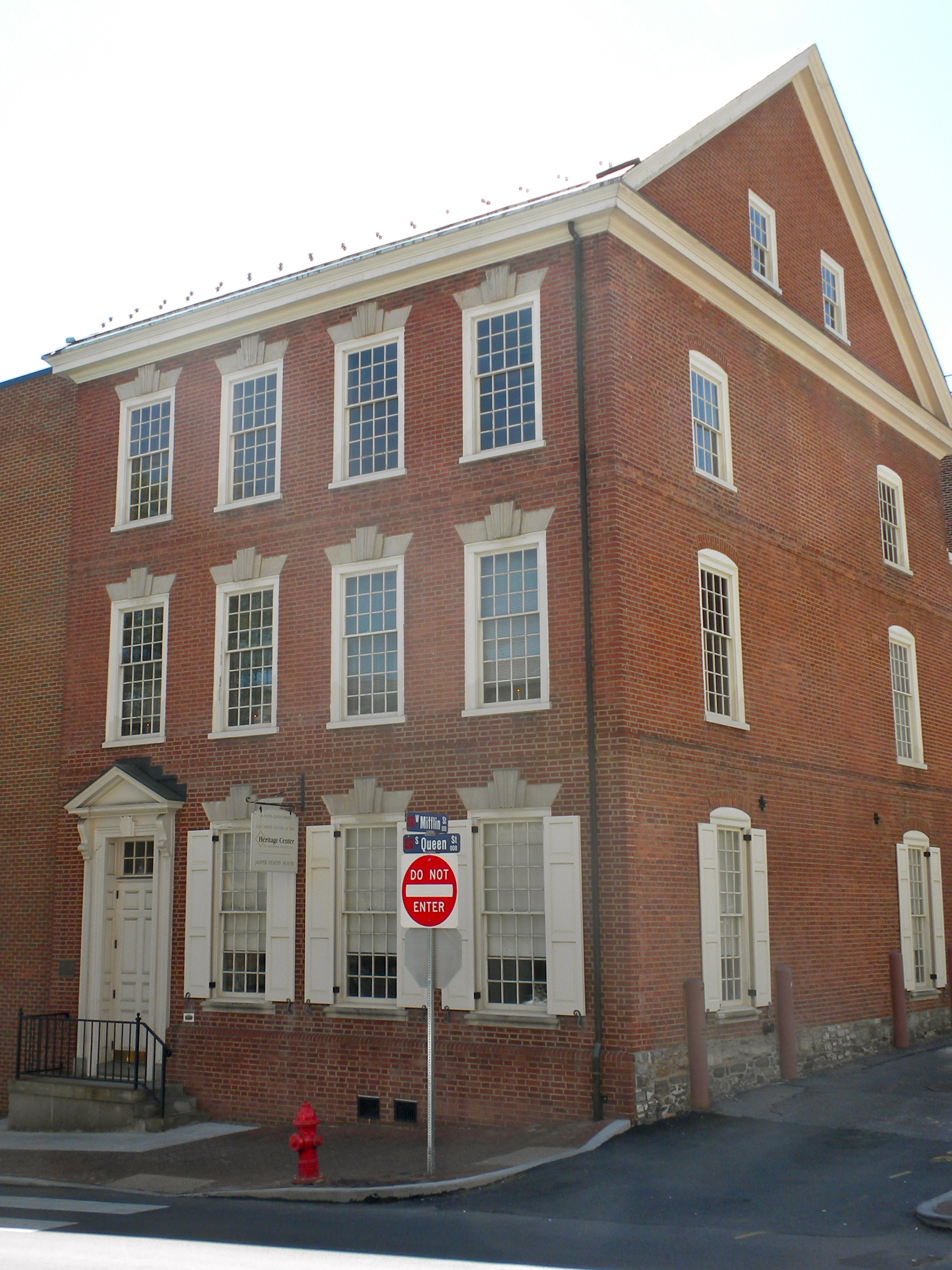
The Jasper Yeates House in Lancaster, Pennsylvania

== Early life and education ==
Jasper Yeates was born in Philadelphia on April 9, 1745 to John and Elizabeth Sidebotham Yeates. He graduated from the College of Philadelphia with a Bachelor of Arts in 1758 and later received a Master of Arts degree. He studied law and was admitted to the Bar of Philadelphia in 1765. He traveled to England to study at the Inns of Court for his legal training, as was typical of other colonial aspiring families.

His career began in Lancaster, Pennsylvania, west of Philadelphia where he became a prominent member of the bar. On December 30, 1767 he married Sarah Burd, eldest daughter of Colonel James Burd and his wife Sarah Shippen. During the American Revolution, he sided with the Patriot cause. In 1776, he served as a commissioner to investigate Native American affairs in Pittsburgh. Yeates was a prominent lawyer in Lancaster and during his career he built a fine library of legal books in several languages totaling 1,043 volumes in all. Most were purchased in Dublin and London. The library today is housed in its entirety in the library of LancasterHistory.org in Lancaster, Pa. where it is available for scholarly research.

After the Revolution, Yeates was a delegate to the Pennsylvania convention that ratified the United States Constitution in 1787.

Appointed as a justice of the Pennsylvania Supreme Court in 1791, he served until his death in 1817. Smith was impeached on flimsy political grounds on March 23, 1804 by the Democratic–Republican-led Pennsylvania House of Representatives alongside the other two Federalist justices of the Supreme Court, Edward Shippen IV and Thomas Smith. The sole Democratic–Republican member of the court, who had been not in attendance on the day the court heard the case central to the impeachment, was not impeached. The justices were not removed, being acquitted in their impeachment trial before the Pennsylvania Senate in the vote held on January 28, 1805.

A Federalist, he was appointed by the Washington administration in 1794 to serve on a commission sent to negotiate an end to the Whiskey Rebellion. Yeates died in Lancaster, Pennsylvania on March 14, 1817 and is buried in St. James Episcopal Church cemetery along with his wife Sarah, who died October 25, 1829.

== Legacy and honors ==
- The Jasper Yeates House was listed on the National Register of Historic Places in 1982.
