= Yate (disambiguation) =

Yate is a town in Gloucestershire, England.

Yate may also refer to:

- Yate and Pickup Bank, a civil parish in Lancashire, England
- Yate (telephony engine), an open-source telephony engine
- Yate (volcano), a volcano in southern Chile
- Yaté, a commune in the southern province of New Caledonia, Pacific Ocean
- Yaté Dam, a dam in New Caledonia
- Yaté River, a river in New Caledonia, Pacific Ocean
- Yate baronets, two different baronetcies
- Eucalyptus cornuta or Yate, a species of tree native to Western Australia
- Yatê, an Indigenous language of eastern Brazil

== People with the name ==
- Sir Charles Yate, 1st Baronet (1849–1940), British administrator in India and politician
- Charles Allix Lavington Yate (1872–1914), British First World War recipient of the Victoria Cross

=== Fictional ===
- Yate Fulham, a character in Isaac Asimov's Foundation series

== See also ==
- Yates (disambiguation)
