= Arthur Wolcott Yates =

United States Army general (1865–1930)

Arthur Wolcott Yates (February 14, 1865 – September 27, 1930) was a brigadier general in the United States Army.

Yates joined the Army in 1891 and would later serve in the Spanish–American War. Following the war he was assigned to the Quartermaster Corps. During World War I, he would serve in France. Following the war he would become Chief of Transportation of the Army. In 1926, he became Assistant to the Quartermaster General of the Army and served until his retirement in 1927.

Born in Wisconsin, Yates died in San Francisco, California. He is buried at Arlington National Cemetery.
