= Sammy Yates =

English footballer (born 1953)

Personal information
- Full name: David Yates
- Date of birth: 18 March 1953 (age 73)
- Place of birth: Barnsley, England
- Position: Full-back

Senior career*
Years	Team	Apps	(Gls)
1971–1978	Barnsley	104	(2)
1977	→ Grimsby Town (loan)	10	(0)
1978–1979	Frickley Athletic		
1979–1980	Matlock Town		
1980–1981	Birdwell Rovers		
1981–198?	Hoyland Town Jags		
- * Club domestic league appearances and goals

David "Sammy" Yates (born 18 March 1953) is an English former professional footballer who played as a full-back.
