= Nicola Yeates =

British academic

- Occupation: Professor of Social Policy
- Honors: Fellow of the Academy of Social Sciences (2025); Fellow of the Higher Education Academy (2007)

Academic background
- Education: University of Bath (BSc); University of Bristol (PhD); Queen’s University Belfast (PGCert)

Academic work
- Discipline: Social policy
- Institutions: The Open University
- Main interests: Globalization; Care economies Labour migration Social policy
- Notable works: Globalizing Care Economies and Migrant Workers; Understanding Global Social Policy; Global Youth Unemployment

Nicola Yeates is a British academic and Professor of Social Policy at The Open University. Her work focuses on globalization, social policy, care economies, and international labor migration.

== Education ==
Yeates earned a BSc (Hons) in Sociology and Social Policy from the University of Bath in 1990. She completed her PhD at the University of Bristol in 1996. In 1999, she obtained a Postgraduate Certificate in Higher Education Teaching from Queen’s University Belfast.

== Academic career ==
Yeates began her academic career as a Research Fellow at the Women’s Education Research and Resource Centre, University College Dublin, under the European Commission’s Human Capital Mobility Programme (1994–1995). She was appointed Teaching Fellow in Social Policy at University College Dublin (1995–1996).

From 1996 to 2005, Yeates was a Lecturer in Social Policy at Queen’s University Belfast. She was promoted to Senior Lecturer at The Open University in 2005, later becoming Professor of Social Policy in 2011 and subsequently in 2023.

== Research ==
Yeates’ research examines transnationalisation and globalisation as social processes and their implications for social policy and welfare. Her work considers how social diversity, inequality and division are shaped and addressed through cross-border dynamics.

Her areas of study include global and regional systems of social governance and their interaction with national welfare systems; labour migration, health and social protection; and the development of transnational advocacy and policy networks. She has written on the concept of “global care chains” and the effects of international migration on health and social care systems.

Yeates has co-authored studies on international health worker migration and governance, including International Health Worker Migration and Recruitment: Global Governance, Politics and Policy, which examines the global political economy of health labour recruitment. With Ross Fergusson, she has also published on global youth unemployment, exploring its political economy and governance challenges.

Her research has been supported by funding from organisations including UK Research and Innovation, the ESRC–DFID Joint Fund for Poverty Alleviation, the Canadian Institutes of Health Research, and the European Science Foundation.

She has also collaborated with international bodies such as the World Health Organization, the International Labour Organization, UNESCO and the World Bank, in addition to regional organisations in Africa, Latin America and Asia. At The Open University she leads a research partnership with Public Services International, a global federation of public service trade unions.

== Honors ==
Yeates was elected a Fellow of the Academy of Social Sciences in 2025, and became a Fellow of the Higher Education Academy in 2007. In recognition of her contributions to teaching, she received a Teaching Excellence Award from Queen’s University Belfast in 2003. She has also served as an elected member of the Social Policy Association.

== Selected books ==
- Yeates, N. and Holden, C. (Eds.). (2022). Understanding Global Social Policy (3rd ed.). Bristol: The Policy Press.
- Yeates, N. and Fergusson, R. (2021). Global Youth Unemployment: History, Governance and Policy. Edward Elgar Publishing. ISBN 978-1-78990-041-5.
- Yeates, N. and Pillinger, J. (2019). International Health Worker Migration and Recruitment: Global Governance, Politics and Policy. Routledge. ISBN 978-1-138-93330-9.
- Yeates, N. (2014). Understanding Global Social Policy (2nd ed.). Bristol: The Policy Press.
- Yeates, N. (2009). Globalizing Care Economies and Migrant Workers: Explorations in Global Care Chains. Palgrave Macmillan. ISBN 978-0-230-00534-1.
- Yeates, N. and Holden, C. (Eds.). (2009). The Global Social Policy Reader. Bristol: The Policy Press.
- Deacon, B., Macovei, M., van Langenhove, L., & Yeates, N. (Eds.). (2009). World-Regional Social Policy and Global Governance: New Research and Policy Agendas in Africa, Asia, Europe and Latin America. London: Routledge.
- Newman, J. and Yeates, N. (2008). Social Justice: Welfare, Crime and Society. Open University Press.
- Yeates, N. (2008). Understanding Global Social Policy. Bristol: The Policy Press.
- Yeates, N. (2001). Globalization and Social Policy. Sage Publications. ISBN 978-0-7619-6802-3. (Also published in Italian, 2004)

== Selected journal articles ==
- Lambin, R., Yeates, N., Mackinder, S., Holden, C., Idris, N., & Snell, C. (2025). "Legitimacy in 21st-Century Polylateralism: The Case of Global Health Funds". Global Governance: A Review of Multilateralism and International Organizations, 31(3), 284–311.
- Yeates, N. and Surender, R. (2021). "Southern social world-regionalisms: The place of health in nine African regional economic communities". Global Social Policy, 21(2), 191–214. doi:10.1177/1468018120961850.
- Yeates, N. and Owusu-Sykere, F. (2019). "The financialisation of transnational family care: a study of UK-based senders of remittances to Ghana and Nigeria". Journal of International and Comparative Social Policy, 35(2), 137–156. doi:10.1080/21699763.2019.1593879.
- Fergusson, R. and Yeates, N. (2014). "International governmental organisations and global youth unemployment: the normative and ideational foundations of policy discourses". Policy and Politics, 42(3), 439–458. doi:10.1332/030557312X655957.
- Yeates, N. (2011). "The Irish Catholic female religious and the transnationalisation of care: an historical perspective". Irish Journal of Sociology, 19(2), 77–93.
- Yeates, N. (2010). "The globalisation of paid care labour migration: policy issues, approaches and responses". International Labour Review, 149(4), 423–440.
- Yeates, N. (2005). "The General Agreement on Trade in Services: What’s in it for social security?". International Social Security Review, 58(1), 3–22.
- Yeates, N. (2004). "Global Care Chains: critical reflections and lines of enquiry". International Feminist Journal of Politics, 6(3), 369–391. doi:10.1080/1461674042000235573.
- Yeates, N. (2002). "Globalization and Social Policy: from global neoliberal hegemony to global political pluralism". Global Social Policy, 2(1), 69–91.
- Yeates, N. (1999). "Social Politics and Policy in an Era of Globalisation: critical reflections". Social Policy and Administration, 33(4), 372–393.
