= ThreeJars =

Children's financial literacy company in the United States

ThreeJars, Inc. was a U.S.-based company specializing in teaching financial literacy to children aged 5 to 13 through an online allowance service. They encouraged teaching children about money early in life, through allowance, and hands-on experience.

As of 2021, ThreeJars had gone out of business due to high operational costs, as stated on their site.

== Operation ==
ThreeJars worked like an online bank for children, but instead of cash, parents paid allowances in IOUs, representing real money. Parents decided how the allowance would be allocated to their child's SAVE, SPEND and SHARE Jars. Parents could track chores and paying projects. Earned IOUs were credited to a child's jars, but the actual cash stayed with the parent. A parent's approval was required for all financial transactions. Children learned to budget, set financial goals, delay gratification, earn interest, and make charitable donations. Children tracked their own financial choices.

ThreeJars employed the financial expertise of Jean Chatzky.

The company was located in Westport, Connecticut, and serviced the United States and Canada.

== History ==
ThreeJars was founded by a husband and wife of six children: Anton Simunovic and Carlotta McClaran. The founders explain on their website:

Like most parents, my wife and I wanted our kids to lead happy, purposeful lives. But how to raise a child with a mind for managing money and a heart for helping others? Despite a career in finance, I found it hard to speak to my kids about money. While I didn't want them to feel entitled, I didn't want them to stress over money either. We all know that if you do not learn to manage money responsibly it will end up managing you. If we're lucky, we also understand that by helping others we are really helping ourselves. Both of these values are at the core of ThreeJars.

== Partnerships ==
ThreeJars partnered with several experts (including Jean Chatzky), companies (including Rogers Communications and Parents magazine), and charities in the fields of finance, parenting, and philanthropy. Charities that were supported by ThreeJars clients include:

- American Society for the Prevention of Cruelty to Animals
- Save the Children
- The Mr. Holland's Opus Foundation
- The Nature Conservancy
- Performing Animal Welfare Society
- Right to Play
- Sea Turtle Conservancy
- Smile Train
- Whale and Dolphin Conservation Society

== Reception ==
ThreeJars.com was reviewed in various publications and websites, including Consumer Reports, Money Crashers, and Yahoo Finance.

In general, reviewers agreed that the site's independence from credit card payments was a benefit. (Children requested payouts from their virtual accounts, and parents received an alert of the request, fulfilling the request out of their own cash on hand.) However, they disliked the option of payouts in gift cards, noting that such cards limit a child's choices of how to spend their money, and often go unredeemed or partially redeemed. After the Consumer Reports review, ThreeJars ceased to offer gift cards as a redemption option.
