= Manhattan Eye, Ear and Throat Hospital =

Coordinates: 40.764218°N 73.963995°W

- Northwell Health
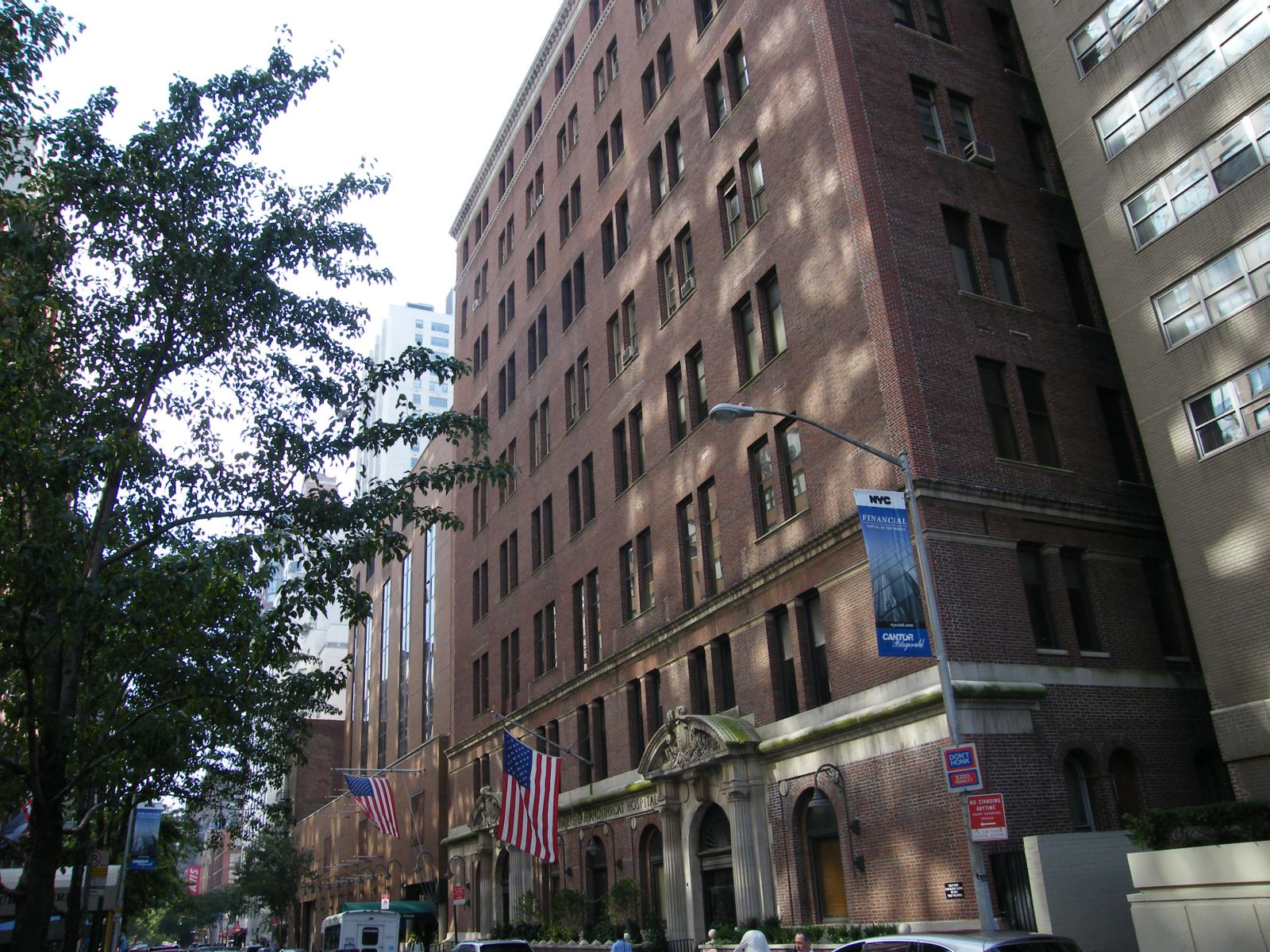
- Facade

Geography
- Location: 210 East 64th Street, Manhattan, New York, United States

Organization
- Care system: Private
- Type: Specialist

Services
- Speciality: ophthalmology, otolaryngology and plastic surgery

History
- Opened: October 16, 1869; 156 years ago

Links
- Website: meeth.northwell.edu
- Lists: Hospitals in New York State
- Other links: Hospitals in Manhattan

Manhattan Eye, Ear and Throat Hospital (MEETH) is a specialty hospital in New York City that was founded in 1869 and is currently located on the Upper East Side of Manhattan at 210 East 64th Street (between 2nd and 3rd Avenues). In 2000, after 131 years as an independent entity MEETH affiliated with (and is now run as a sub-division of) Lenox Hill Hospital, a 450-bed acute care hospital, established in New York City in 1857 and located at 77th Street (between Park and Lexington Avenues) in Manhattan.

MEETH is recognized in medical circles for its long history of contributions in developing the fields of ophthalmology, otolaryngology and plastic surgery.

== History ==
Manhattan Eye, Ear and Throat Hospital was granted a charter from the New York Legislature to found a voluntary, non-profit Eye and Ear hospital on May 9, 1869. The hospital was founded based on the purpose "to alleviate the suffering of the poor and the cultivation and diffusion of sound knowledge of all that relates to the diseases of the eye and ear." The founders of this institution included prominent citizens of the time and pioneers in the field of medicine and surgery, a group of 17 men: including 14 laymen and 3 physicians. They hoped to help those afflicted by impaired vision and hearing.

On October 15, 1869, Manhattan Eye, Ear and Throat Hospital was opened in a rented brownstone at 233 East 34th Street. The hospital, which had 13 beds and an outpatient clinic, was supported primarily through charitable donations and no provision was made for private patients. Patients were asked to pay what they could, if they could, and most of them were not able to pay anything. However, the space was not adequate to accommodate the large number of patients seeking medical help there. In the first 14 months of its existence, the hospital treated 1,717 patients, and 294 operations were performed in its quarters. Efforts were initiated almost immediately to raise funds for a larger, more suitable and permanent facility.

The first permanent facility of Manhattan Eye, Ear & Throat Hospital was located on Park Avenue and 41st Street and was completed and opened on October 3, 1881. This 75-bed Hospital quickly became a nationally recognized center for the treatment of Eye, Ear and Throat diseases and by the late 1800s patients were coming from across the United States seeking the specialized care provided by the physicians at Manhattan Eye, Ear & Throat Hospital.

With the number of patients increasing substantially each year, it was not long before the facilities of Manhattan Eye and Ear on Park Avenue became overburdened. On November 1, 1906, the hospital moved to new quarters at 210 East 64th Street. The seven-story building, which served as the hospital's primary inpatient facility for the next 76 years, is still in use, currently housing the outpatient department and administrative offices. The annex on 63rd Street was completed in 1917, increasing the hospital's working capacity by 30%. In 1925, three floors were added to the main hospital building on East 64th Street.

In 1926, the hospital merged with the Manhattan Throat Hospital, retaining the Eye, Ear and Throat name and facilities.

In the ensuing years, many renovation projects were undertaken to upgrade and improve the East 64th Street facility. However, by the late 1970s the hospital was inadequate to accommodate the 10,000 inpatients and the nearly 100,000 outpatients treated annually, and plans were initiated for a new seven floor addition to the hospital's complex. In addition to totally replacing the hospital's inpatient facilities and surgical suites, the new building allowed expansion of research programs.

Many world-renowned physicians have been associated with MEETH, including its founders Cornelius Agnew and Daniel B. St. John Roosa, Charles Kelman, Lawrence Yannuzzi, David Gilbert Yates. Including Metropolitan Throat founder, the roster adds Clinton Wagner, who also founded the world's first laryngological society.

In 1999 the board of directors of MEETH adopted a plan to sell the real estate on East 64th Street, terminate its residency program and close all hospital functions. The Supreme Court of New York County denied the petition associated with this plan, finding instead that the closure was not proper and not the only available alternative. Subsequently, in 2000 the MEETH instead affiliated with Lenox Hill Hospital in a merger in which no money was exchanged, according to press reports.

In January, 2004 Olivia Goldsmith, a novelist, died at MEETH after elective facial surgery and in February, 2004, another patient (Susan Malitz) died at MEETH during a face-lift. Both incidents attracted national attention at the time.

== Medical specialties ==
Today, Manhattan Eye, Ear and Throat Hospital is a center for postgraduate training of ophthalmologists, otolaryngologists and plastic surgeons.

=== Ophthalmology – eye care ===
Medical care is provided for the diagnosis and treatment of afflictions of the eye, including issues such as cataracts, glaucoma and age-related macular degeneration. Medical research is being conducted on an ongoing basis to better understand mechanisms and treatments for diseases of the eye.

=== Otolaryngology – head and neck surgery ===
Medical care is provided for the diagnosis and treatment of disorders of the ears, nose, sinuses, throat, head and neck. Treatment is provided to both adult and pediatric patients. Some of the areas of treatment include: head and neck tumor surgery, thyroid and parathyroid gland surgery, surgery for sleep apnea, ear surgery, emergency services, plastic and reconstructive surgery, minimally invasive skull base surgery and reconstruction of congenital deformities of the ear.

=== Plastic surgery ===
The Plastic Surgery Clinic provides aesthetic surgical procedures including: facelift, browlift (eyebrows), blepharoplasty (eyelids), rhinoplasty (nose), otoplasty (ears), breast augmentation, breast reduction, abdominoplasty (tummy tuck), liposuction, botox and fat injections and others.

== Research milestones ==
MEETH has played a long-standing role in ophthalmic research and has claimed many firsts: first allergy clinic in the United States - 1916, first diagnostic treatment clinic for glaucoma - 1942, first eye bank - 1944, first small-incision phacoemulsification cataract extraction - 1967, first cochlear implant center - 1983, first nasal center - 1989, first excimer laser vision correction trials - 1990, first laser procedure for cataract extraction - 1993. MEETH has also been a pioneer in: Photodynamic therapy for wet macular degeneration, the use of sonography (ultrasound) and angiography to diagnose a wide range of eye disorders, ophthalmic plastic surgery, and LASIK laser vision correction.
