= Sidney Yeates =

Australian pastoralist and businessman

Sidney Yeates (ca. September 1831 – 20 June 1918) was a pastoralist and businessman in South Australia and Queensland, principal of the firm of Cudmore, Yeates and Co.

== History ==
Sidney Yeates was born in London, and arrived in South Australia when 6 years of age. He selected Crown land at Mount Remarkable (now Melrose township), South Australia, grazing sheep until 1863, when he sold up to move to Queensland. With his brother John and overseer Frank Gardiner, he purchased 4000 sheep at Maitland, New South Wales, and drove them across New England via Quart Pot Creek (now Stanthorpe), Drayton, Dalby and Jinghi station to Mackay, thence to Mount Dryanda, Proserpine, where he settled on a property, but had hardly commenced operations, when Aboriginals killed one of the men and half of the sheep, so Yeates decided to abandon sheep for cattle, and moved to the Lynd River, selecting on Myall Downs. Later he sold that property, and in 1868 selected land on the Don River, near Bowen, where they resided until 1880, when he entered into partnership with J. F. Cudmore, and moved to Adavale where they purchased Boondoon and Mentone leaseholds, with 4000 cattle. Subsequently, these properties were stocked with 50,000 sheep and were carried on until 1894, when Sidney Yeates retired from the partnership and lived privately first in Brisbane and later in Toowoomba.

== Other interests ==
Sidney Yeates was a keen politician in the days of McIlwraith and Griffith, and fought vigorously for the transcontinental land grant railway scheme in the early 1880s. He was a prominent member of the Wangaratta Divisional Board.

== Family ==
Sidney married Dymphna Maria Cudmore (1837 – 4 March 1899), daughter of Daniel Cudmore), on 27 March 1857. He was survived by nine sons. Albert (1860–1941) and the other older sons were pastoralists, while the two youngest, Kenneth and Herbert (1879–1945) were the principals of the firm of Yeates Bros, and Co., stock and station agents, Toowoomba, while Milo was in charge of the Dalby branch. Herbert was a member of Queensland's Legislative Assembly from 1938 to 1945.
