= Yet =

Yet or YET may refer to:

- YET, the IATA code for Edson Airport, Alberta, Canada
- YET, the National Rail code for Yetminster railway station in Dorset, UK
- "Yet" (song) by the American band Exile, 1990
- "Yet", song by Spacey Jane from Here Comes Everybody, 2022
- Yett, sometimes spelt yet is a local dialect term in lowland Scotland and Cumbria for a reinforced door or gate

== See also ==
- Yet another
