= Yates Spring =

Coordinates: 34°49′58.28″N 85°9′11.83″W

Location
- Country: United States
- State: Georgia
- County: Catoosa County

Physical characteristics
- Source: Spring

Yates Spring is a spring in Catoosa County, in the U.S. state of Georgia.

== History ==
Yates Spring was named for Major Presley Yates, who settled there in the 1830s.
