= Donald Norton Yates =

United States Air Force general (1909–1993)

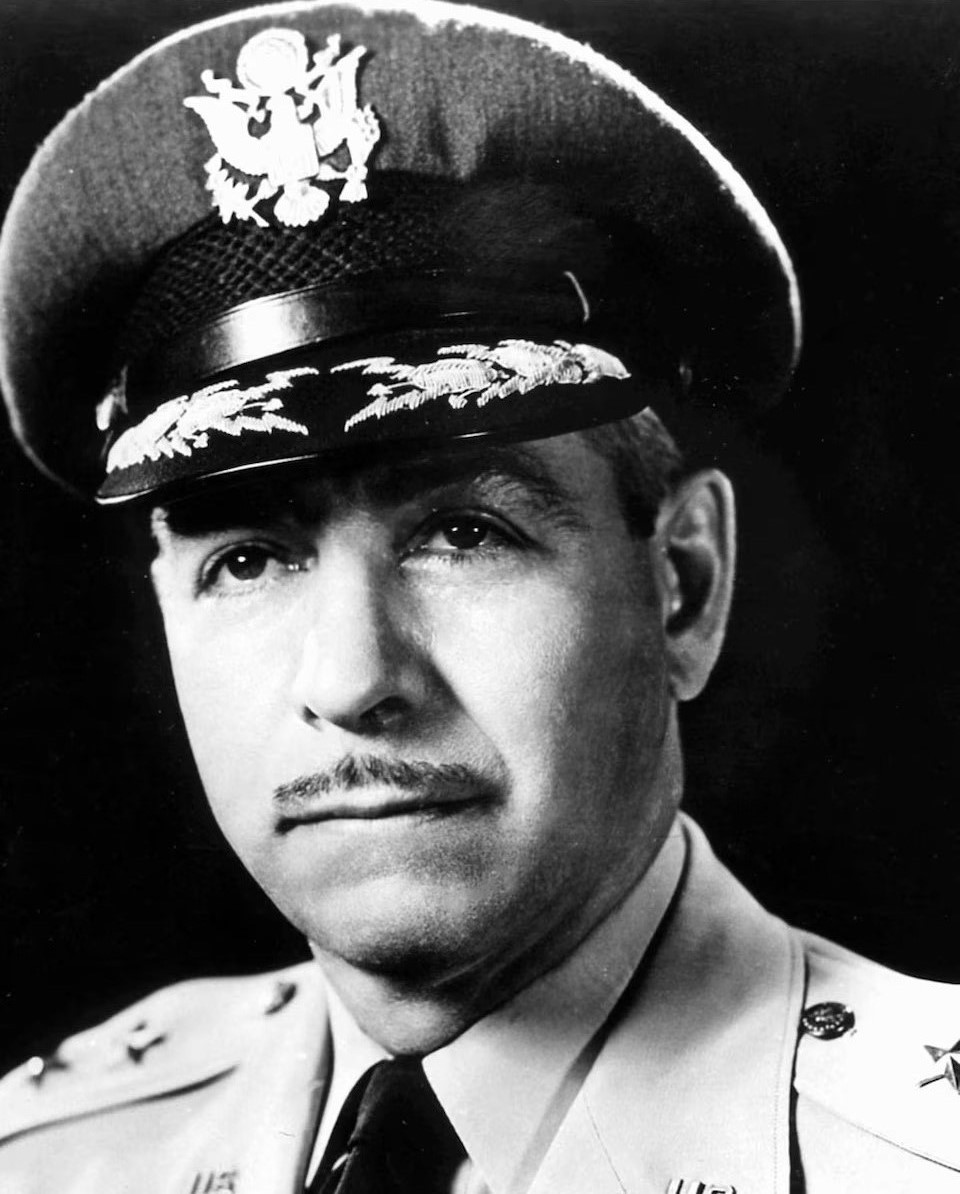
- Born: November 25, 1909; Bangor, Maine, U.S.
- Died: August 28, 1993 (aged 83); Longwood, Florida, U.S.
- Burial place: Arlington National Cemetery
- Education: United States Military Academy; California Institute of Technology
- Spouse: Gertrude I. Yates
- Relatives: Elmer P. Yates (brother)
- Military career
- Allegiance: United States
- Branch: United States Army Air Forces; United States Air Force
- Service years: 1931–1961
- Rank: Lieutenant General
- Conflicts: World War II
- Awards: Distinguished Service Medal (2); Legion of Merit (3); Air Medal (3)

Donald Norton Yates (November 25, 1909 – August 28, 1993) was the US Army Air Force officer who helped select June 6, 1944 as the date for D-Day, the Allied invasion of Europe, in his capacity as chief meteorologist on General Dwight D. Eisenhower's staff. Yates and his British counterpart, James Martin Stagg, chose well – it turned out to be the only day that month the English Channel could have been successfully crossed. Yates was subsequently decorated by three governments. He went on to become the chief meteorologist of the newly formed U.S. Air Force, and commander of the Air Force Missile Test Center at Patrick Air Force Base in Florida.

== Early life and career ==
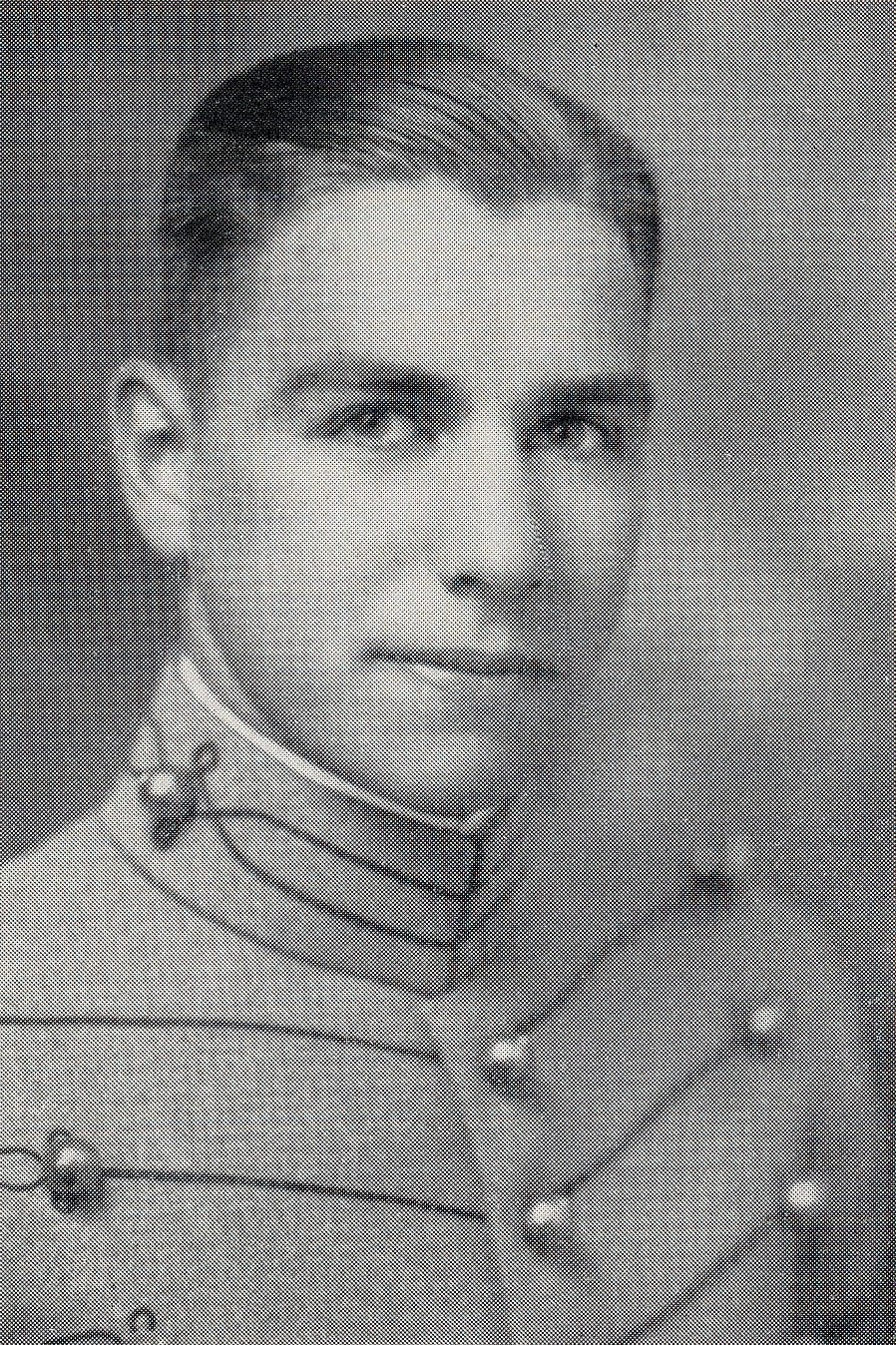
Yates as a United States Military Academy cadet c. 1931

Yates was born in Bangor, Maine, on November 25, 1909, and graduated from Bangor High School in 1927. He went on to the U.S. Military Academy, graduating in 1931, and was commissioned a second lieutenant in the Cavalry, departing immediately for pilot training at Kelly Field, Texas. His first military assignment was to Luke Field, Hawaii, with the 23d Bomb Squadron. In June 1938, Yates enrolled as a graduate student at the California Institute of Technology, and received a master of science degree in meteorology in June 1939. Yates became assistant chief of the weather section in the operations division of the Office, Chief of Air Corps, in December 1941. With the outbreak of war, he was appointed the following year deputy director of weather at Army Air Force Headquarters.

== World War II ==
From May to December 1942, Lt. Col. Yates visited the Soviet Union to coordinate weather matters as part of a military mission. He subsequently received the Distinguished Service Medal and the Air Medal for his actions during the trip.

=== On Eisenhower's staff, and planning for D-Day ===
In February 1944, Col. Yates became director of weather service for the U.S. Strategic Air Force in Europe, in addition, serving on General Eisenhower's staff. In this capacity he made, together with British Group Captain James Martin Stagg, the final recommendation of June 6, 1944 as D-Day. The citation accompanying his award of the U.S. Army Legion of Merit stated that "through Colonel Yates' good judgment, skill and sound leadership, reconciliation of the differences in forecasting methods were effected, resulting in the development of a procedure capable of utilizing the talents and facilities of both nations (U.S. and U.K.) and all services in a unified manner. The value of Colonel Yates' advice has since been proven as the day selected for the continental assault was probably the only day during the month of June on which the operation could have been launched."

== Air Force and promotion to general ==
Upon his return to the United States in January 1945, Col. Yates was made chief of the Weather Division, which later was merged with the Weather Wing to form the Air Weather Service, which he commanded at Andrews Air Force Base, Maryland, until 1950. During this period he was promoted to the rank of brigadier general in 1947, and transferred to the U.S. Air Force. On March 17, 1947, he flew the first scheduled weather reconnaissance mission over the North Pole. In 1950, Brig. Gen. Yates was appointed assistant deputy chief of staff for development at Headquarters U.S. Air Force, and the following April he became director of research and development with the headquarters. He was promoted to the rank of major general in 1952.

== Patrick Air Force Base and the Pentagon ==
Maj. Gen. Yates was commander of the Air Force Missile Test Center, Patrick Air Force Base, Florida, from 1954 to 1960. During this tour he was awarded the Navy Legion of Merit for his services in connection with the Navy Project Vanguard and the Navy Ballistic Missile Program Polaris. in 1960 Yates was promoted to the rank of lieutenant general and appointed deputy director of defense research & engineering (ranges and space ground support) at the Pentagon. Yates retired from the United States Air Force on March 31, 1961. He received a second award of the Distinguished Service Medal upon his retirement.

== Foreign awards and scientific appointments ==
Yates was made a chevalier of the Legion of Honour for his contribution to D-Day invasion planning and also awarded the Croix de Guerre with palm by France. He was made an honorary officer of the Order of the British Empire by the United Kingdom and a Grande-Oficial de Ordem Militar de Cristo by Portugal.

Yates was a president of the American Meteorological Society, a member of the Institute of Aeronautical Sciences, and a Fellow of the American Rocket Society.

== Later life and family ==
After his retirement from the U.S. Air Force, Yates worked for Raytheon. He retired as an executive vice president and moved to Florida in the late 1970s. His wife Gertrude died in 1976. Yates died at his home in Longwood, Florida on August 28, 1993. He was interred beside his wife at Arlington National Cemetery.

Yates' younger brother Elmer P. Yates also graduated from West Point and became a major general in the U.S. Army Corps of Engineers.

== See also ==
- Weather forecasting for Operation Overlord
- James Martin Stagg
- Sverre Petterssen
