= Elmer P. Yates =

United States Army general

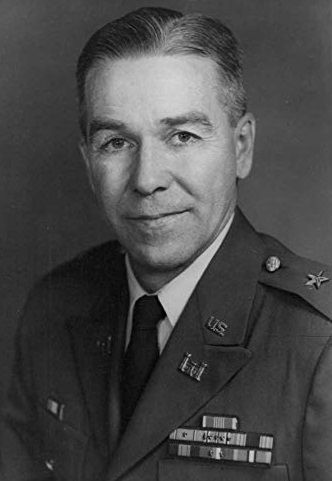
- Yates as a brigadier general
- Born: Elmer Parker Yates; December 19, 1917; Bangor, Maine
- Died: August 14, 2011 (aged 93); Ogdensburg, New York
- Relatives: Donald Norton Yates
- Military career
- Allegiance: United States of America
- Branch: United States Army
- Service years: 1941–1971
- Rank: Major General
- Unit: U.S. Army Corps of Engineers
- Conflicts: World War II; Vietnam War
- Awards: Distinguished Service Medal (2); Legion of Merit (2); Bronze Star Medal; Air Medal

Elmer Parker Yates (December 19, 1917 – August 14, 2011) was a major general in the United States Army Corps of Engineers who saw service in the Vietnam War. He was the younger brother of United States Air Force Lieutenant General Donald Norton Yates.

== Early life and education ==
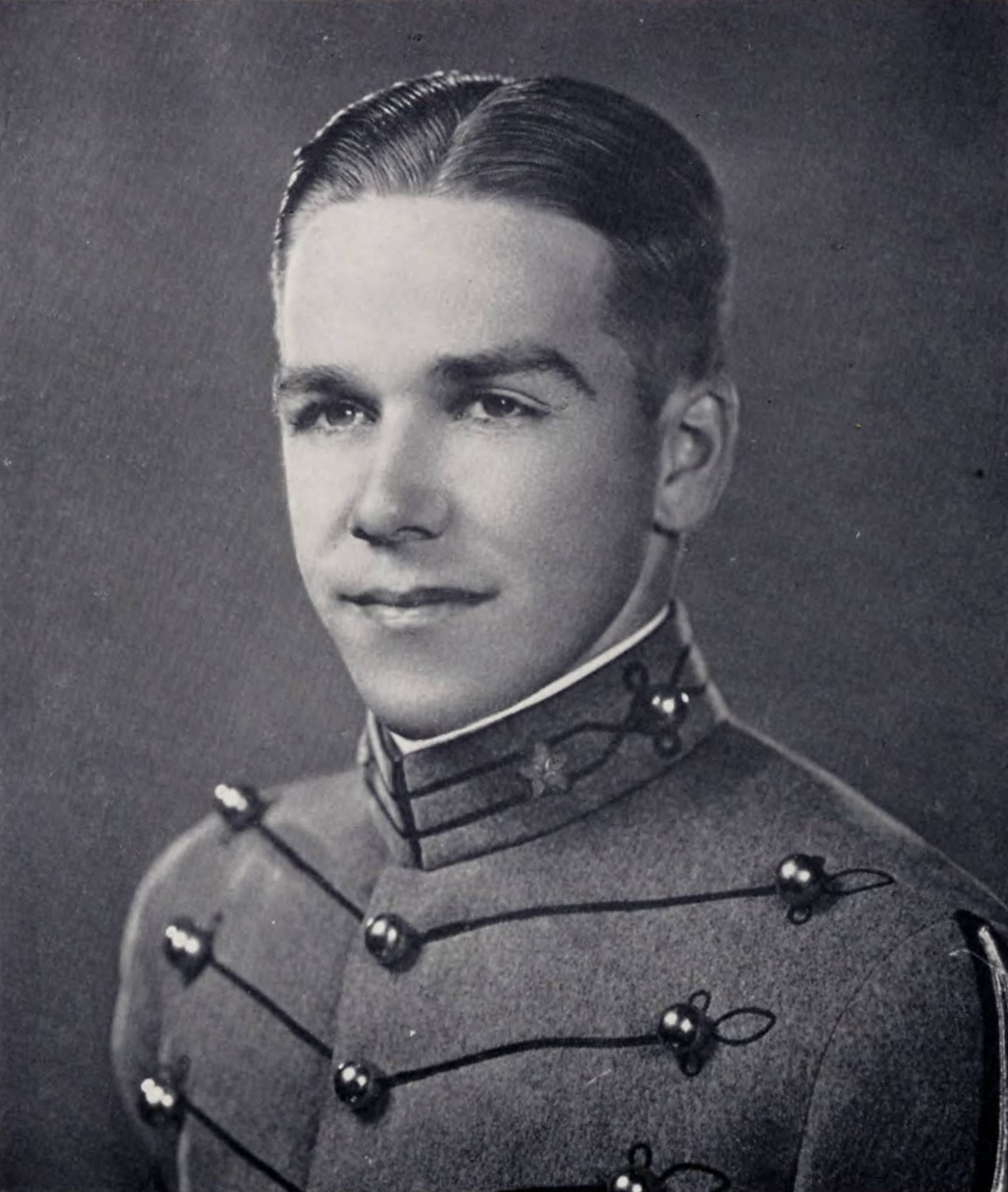
At West Point in 1941

Yates was born in Bangor, Maine, to Archie O. and Gertrude A. (Wilson) Yates and attended Bangor High School. He spent one year at the Stanton Preparatory Academy in Cornwall, New York, before entering the United States Military Academy in 1937. Yates graduated second in the West Point class of 1941, winning three of the fifteen available academic awards, including the Robert E. Lee Saber for the highest standing in mathematics. On graduation, he entered the U.S. Army Corps of Engineers.

In 1946, Yates graduated from the Command and General Staff School at Fort Leavenworth, Kansas. From June 1948 to June 1950, he attended the Cornell University Graduate School and completed an M.S. degree in engineering physics. His thesis was entitled "Soil moisture determination by neutron scattering." In 1963, Yates graduated from the National War College.

== Career ==
During World War II, Yates served with the 3rd Engineer Battalion, 24th Infantry Division in Hawaii and the Philippines. From June 1945 to June 1948, he was an instructor of military art and engineering at the Military Academy.

From 1950 to 1952, Yates was stationed in Albuquerque, New Mexico. From 1952 to 1954, he was assigned to Killeen Base, Texas. From 1954 to 1956, Yates served a tour of duty in South Korea. From 1956 to 1962, he worked at the Atomic Energy Commission and the Pentagon while living in Arlington, Virginia. In August 1961, Yates was promoted to colonel.

Yates did two tours of duty as a senior officer during the Vietnam War. In 1968–1969, he was deputy chief of the Engineering Division of the U.S. Army Vietnam. In 1969–1970, he was director of construction in Vietnam, with the rank of brigadier general. Yates was awarded the Distinguished Service Medal, Bronze Star Medal and Air Medal for his Vietnam service.

In 1963–1966, Yates was chief engineer of the Corps' Philadelphia District. In 1966–1968, he was chief engineer of the North Pacific Division, headquartered in Portland, Oregon, and responsible for the Columbia River Basin. In 1970, he became director of installations in the Office of the Deputy Chief of Staff for Logistics with the rank of major general. Yates retired from active duty in 1971. He received a Distinguished Service Medal and two awards of the Legion of Merit for his domestic service in the Army.

== Family and later life ==
Yates began dating Natalie Duty while still in high school. They were married on June 29, 1941. Yates and his wife had a son, daughter and three granddaughters.

After retirement, Yates and his wife moved to Trenton, Maine. He died at the home of his son in Ogdensburg, New York on August 14, 2011.
