= Yates Township, McLean County, Illinois =

Coordinates: 40°43′13″N 88°38′54″W

Yates Township
- Township
- Location in McLean County

- McLean County's location in Illinois
- Country: United States
- State: Illinois
- County: McLean
- Established: November 3, 1857
- Named for: Richard Yates

Area
  - Total: 36.53 sq mi (94.6 km^{2})
  - Land: 36.52 sq mi (94.6 km^{2})
  - Water: 0.01 sq mi (0.026 km^{2}) 0.03%

Population (2010)
  - Estimate (2016): 284
  - Density: 7.9/sq mi (3.1/km^{2})
- Time zone: UTC-6 (CST)
  - Summer (DST): UTC-5 (CDT)
- FIPS code: 17-113-83804

Yates Township is located in McLean County, Illinois. As of the 2010 census, its population was 287 and it contained 121 housing units. Yates Township formed as Union Township from Chenoa Township on June 5, 1862. Union was changed to Yates sometime prior to 1920.

== History ==
Yates Township is named after Governor Richard Yates.

== Geography ==
According to the 2010 census, the township has a total area of 36.53 square miles (94.6 km^{2}), of which 36.52 square miles (94.6 km^{2}) (or 99.97%) is land and 0.01 square miles (0.026 km^{2}) (or 0.03%) is water.

== Demographics ==
Historical population
Census	Pop.	Note	%±
2016 (est.)	284
U.S. Decennial Census
