= David Gilbert Yates =

American physician (1870–1918)

- Born: 1870; New Jersey
- Died: May 9, 1918
- Scientific career
- Fields: Otolaryngology
- Workplaces: Manhattan Eye, Ear and Throat Hospital

David Gilbert Yates (1870 – May 9, 1918) was an American otorhinolaryngologist, born in New Jersey. He attended private schools and after a brief stint as a journalist entered New York University, receiving his medical degree in 1898. He performed surgery at the Manhattan Eye, Ear and Throat Hospital, and at other facilities.

He contributed many original papers to the literature of his specialty, and at various times was contributing editor of the Medical Critic and of the New International Yearbook, and medical editor of the New International Encyclopedia.
