= Les Français parlent aux Français =

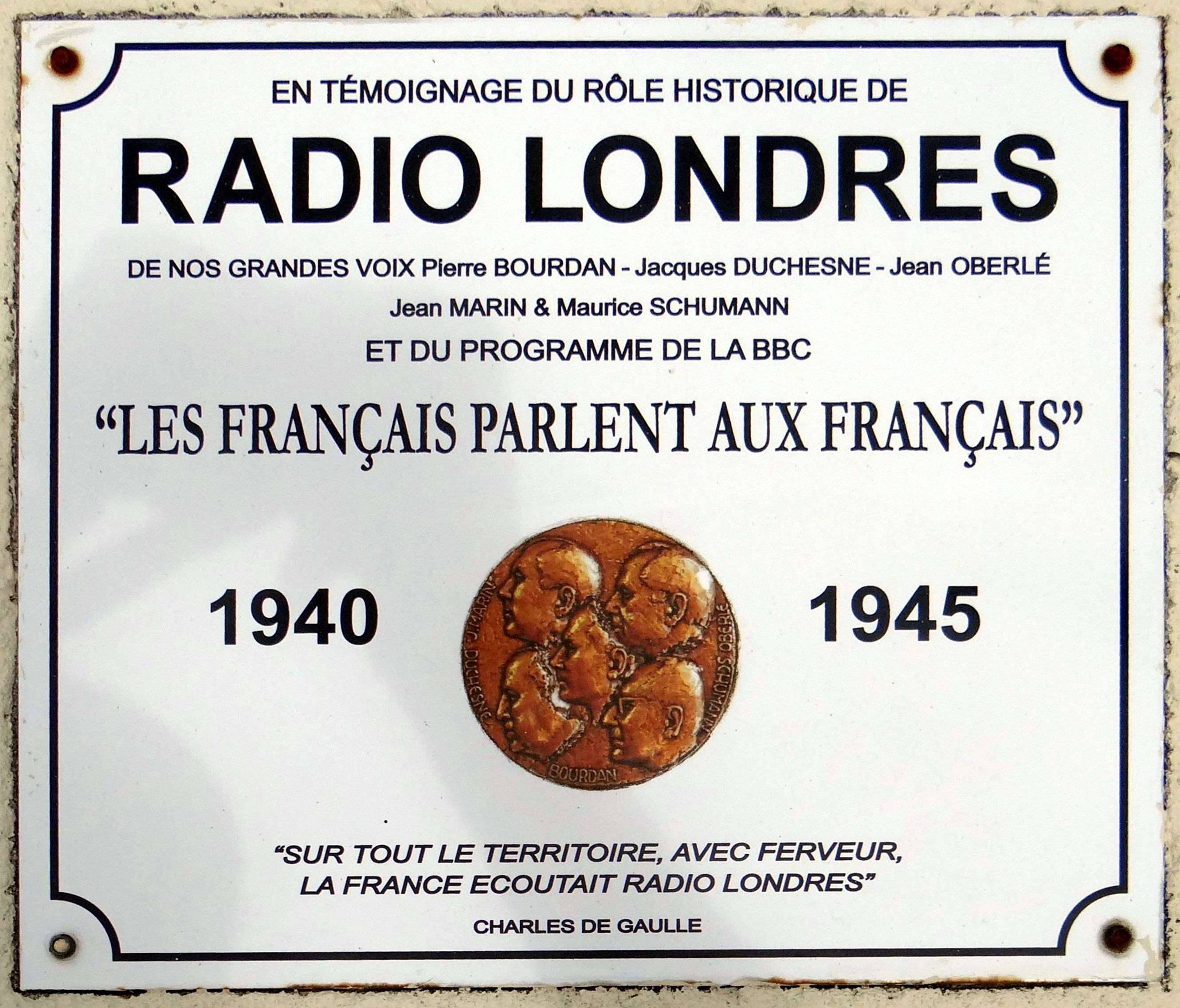
- Commemorative plaque at the Cemetery of Asnelles.
- Other names: Ici la France
- Language: French
- Home station: BBC – Radio Londres
- Original release: 14 July 1940 – 31 August 1944

Les Français parlent aux Français is a daily radio broadcast in French transmitted on the BBC (Radio Londres). It was broadcast from the 14 July 1940: under the title Ici la France then, from 6 September 1940 to 31 August 1944, under its better known name.

After the Battle of France and the Armistice of 22 June 1940, Charles de Gaulle, who had taken refuge in London, launched the Appeal of 18 June to continue the battle. In the aftermath, a daily radio show, independent of Free France was launched on 14 July, the date of Bastille Day called "Ici la France", then from 6 September 1940, "Les Français parlent aux Français".

The show played a large role in countering news from the front which was redacted by propaganda in Nazi Germany, transmitting coded messages to the French Resistance, and also maintaining the French morale.

The first four musical notes of Symphony No. 5 (Beethoven) served as theme music for the show. This theme was stylised so that it could represent V in Morse code •••— and interpreted as the V sign ((in English)).

== Participants ==
The following took part in the daily show:

- Journalists Jean Marin and Pierre Bourdan
- Designer Jean Oberlé, creator of the famous slogan
  Radio-Paris lies, Radio Paris lies, Radio Paris is German
- Paul Gordeaux who translated foreign news
- Pierre Lazareff who prepared the Allied landings
- Pierre Lefèvre
- Director and actor Jacques Brunius
- Poet and actor "Jacques Duchesne" (Michel Saint-Denis).

They were joined by: Franck Bauer, Maurice Van Moppès, Pierre Dac, Maurice Diamant-Berger and Maurice Schumann who would become the official spokesman for Free France.

General de Gaulle also spoke on the programme, around once a week.

== Personal messages ==
First, please listen to some personal messages

=== Black messages ===
At first, personal messages broadcast by the BBC allowed soldiers separated from their families and loved ones to exchange news.

Jacques Brunius introduced the show on 26 December 1941 before reading the messages with the following: :

"This mail is the mail of those who are prisoners in France. This is undoubtedly the dominant tone of your letters and what constitutes the raison d'être of this program is the proud complaint of a chained people, it is the anger of the prisoner who shakes the bars."

=== Coded messages ===
The famous coded messages of Franck Bauer became well known, as they were often amusing out of context. But behind these phrases were hidden an important significance, such as:

- transmitting a codeword for the preparation of operations of the French Resistance,
- acknowledging receipt of shipments from the field;
- communicating secret information about plans;
- thanking or congratulating agents for their actions;
- allowing field agents to provide people with whom they were in contact with proof of their authenticity and sincerity;
- deceiving the enemy: drowned in the flood of messages, the German intelligence services were busy, trying to concentrate on fictitious operations with unknown codes, meaning that they missed important messages. Indeed, the Nazis did not have an infinite number of radio sets or a sufficient number of operators.

The idea of using personal messages to transmit coded messages came from Georges Bégué, French Officer in the British Secret Service Action SOE, the first agent of this service to parachute into France in May 1941.

Almost 2000 SOE agents were sent on missions to the continent, arriving by air and by sea. Many were exposed and executed.

While the French, and particularly the resistance networks, were listening to the coded messages, so were the Nazis and the Vichy regime. The occupiers put in place a blocking system, but never managed to fully block the theme tune of the Symphony No. 5 (Beethoven). In Morse code, the first four notes of the work (three short and one long) represent the letter "V" for victory. They rarely managed to decrypt and understand the messages. When they did, the operations mentioned in the messages had already taken place; they therefore decided to fight these messages by other means.

Opération Overlord

To activate the resistance just before the Normandy landings, numerous coded messages were broadcast by Radio Londres :

- On 1 June, a network alert,
- On 5 June at 21:15, to start the action that same night.

A famous example often cited was the first strophe of the poem Chanson d'automne by Verlaine which was used for the rail plan of Operation VENTRILOQUIST by Philippe de Vomécourt in Sologne (the mission was to sabotage the rails across Normandy, making them unusable for German reinforcements), under a slightly altered form.

- On 1 June, "Les sanglots longs des violons d'automne..." (Verlaine wrote: "de l'automne"), invited the rail saboteurs to begin their sabotages.
- On 5 June, "Bercent mon cœur d'une langueur monotone." (Verlaine write: "Blessent mon cœur..." – Radio Londres used the modified text used in the 1939 sung version by Charles Trenet), told the resistance group 'VENTRILOQUIST' that they could commence the sabotage operations for which they were responsible.
- The same day, another message ordering that sabotage actions be carried out as soon as possible. "The carrots are cooked". Another code used the same vegetable: "Yvette likes large carrots".

== Bulletins by Pierre Dac ==
Pierre Dac attacked both Adolf Hitler and Joseph Goebbels in the journal L'Os à moelle, and began to listen to French programming on the BBC from 1937.

When he heard the Appeal of 18 June, he decided to join Charles de Gaulle in London.

Once the Germans arrived in Paris, he left for Toulouse in the free zone and listened to Les français parlent aux français every night.

His friend René Lefèvre suggested in December 1940 that he joined the show's team .

In 1941, while the BBC examined his application, he decided to turn up without waiting for their response.

He was arrested in Barcelona and imprisoned, and did not arrive at his destination until 1943, and read his first text on 30 October.

His first speech was acclaimed by French listeners who asked to hear it again. He then prepared new texts by listening to the German controlled radio and mocking their poor strategies and the enemy's defeats. He also wrote texts and songs to motivate France against the invaders, such as a song to the tune of Savez-vous planter les choux:

Les agents sont des brav'gens
Quand ils aident, quand ils aident
Les agents sont des brav'gens
Quand ils aident les résistants

The first in January 1944, when victory seemed close, he read an optimistic text which finished:

Happy New Year, my dear friends, good victory, and see you soon

. A few weeks later, was the Siege of Leningrad and Radio Paris clumsily tried to hide the scale of the German defeat. Pierre Dac responded :

But now the encirclement of the divisions of the Wehrmacht by the Red Army can be called concentric pressure. So, you need to ask, who's crazy? Is it Radio Paris or me?

. On 10 May 1944, a comic dialogue took place between the stations, Philippe Henriot broadcasting on Radio Paris and referring to Pierre Dac as a Jew who fled France without an interest in its fate. The next day, he responded point by point, explaining that his brother had died for France. However, Henriot continued with his insults. Dac, remaining calm, read the text

"About the problem of deportation, not a word. There was nothing about the participation of the occupation authorities in the organization of the deportations"

. The day of the Normandy landings, General de Gaulle went on the BBC to give a speech. He greeted the team, and met Pierre Dac for the first time: the two men greeted each other warmly. The General went on to write a letter on 1 September to thank the team for having

made it possible to achieve Victory

.

On 14 August 1944, Pierre Dac left the station believing he had fulfilled his mission, which made Michel Saint-Denis (Jacques Duchesne), the director of the station.

=== Bibliography ===
- Crémieux-Brilhac, Jean-Louis (1975). Jean-Louis Crémieux-Brilhac (ed.). Le monde en feu. Vol. II. Paris: La Documentation Française. IciLondresT2..
- Dac, Pierre; Pessis, Jacques (2014) [2008]. Un loufoque à Radio Londres. Omnibus. ISBN 978-2-258-11384-8.
- Decèze, Dominique (1979). La lune est pleine d'éléphants verts. Histoire des messages de Radio-Londres à la Résistance française (1942-1944). J. Lanzmann & Seghers.
- Luneau, Aurélie (2005). Radio Londres - 1940-1944 - Les voix de la liberté. Librairie Académique Perrin. ISBN 978-2262023874.
- Laurenceau, Marc (2018). D-Day Hour by Hour. Bayeux: OREP.

=== See also ===
- Radio Londres
- Honneur et Patrie, the show which preceded Les Français parlent aux Français
- German military administration in occupied France during World War II
