= Weather forecasting for Operation Overlord =

The Overlord planners for the invasion of Europe in 1944 specified suitable weather conditions (wind, cloud, tidal, and moon conditions) for the assault landing, with only a few days in each month being suitable. In May and June 1944, frequent pre-assault meetings were held at Southwick House in Hampshire near Portsmouth by Eisenhower with Group Captain James Stagg of the RAF, the chief meteorological officer, SHAEF, his deputy Colonel Donald Yates of the USAAF, and his three two-man teams of meteorologists. Stagg was described as a "dour but canny Scot." He had been given the rank of group captain in the RAF "to lend him the necessary authority in a military milieu unused to outsiders". The senior commanders were General Bernard Montgomery, Admiral Sir Bertram Ramsay and Air Marshal Sir Trafford Leigh-Mallory, plus Eisenhower's deputy, Air Marshall Arthur Tedder, his chief of staff Walter Bedell Smith and his deputy chief of staff, Major General Harold R. Bull.

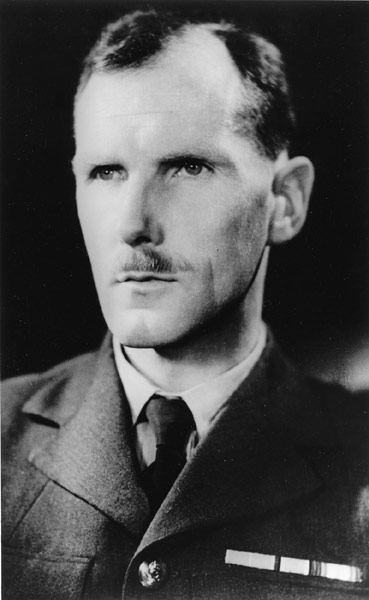
James Stagg

Stagg reported the team consensus, although this has been glossed over in popular memory. Admiral Sir George Creasy remarked on 4 June: "Here comes six feet two inches of Stagg and six foot one inch of gloom...". British general Frederick Morgan (head of COSSAC) had half-jokingly said to him, "Remember, if you don't read the runes (or signs) right, we'll string you up from the nearest lamppost".

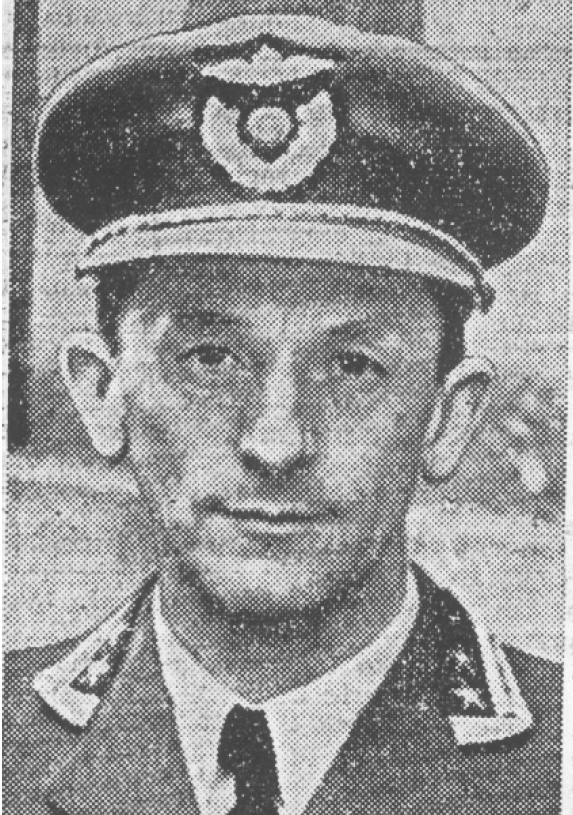
Sverre Petterssen

== Forecasting teams ==
The three weather forecasting teams at Southwick House were from the UK Met Office at Dunstable, the USAAF Eighth Air Force at High Wycombe, and the Royal Navy at Portsmouth; they usually met twice daily; at 9:30 am (0930 hours) and 4:00 pm (1600 hours), with Eisenhower and his senior commanders.

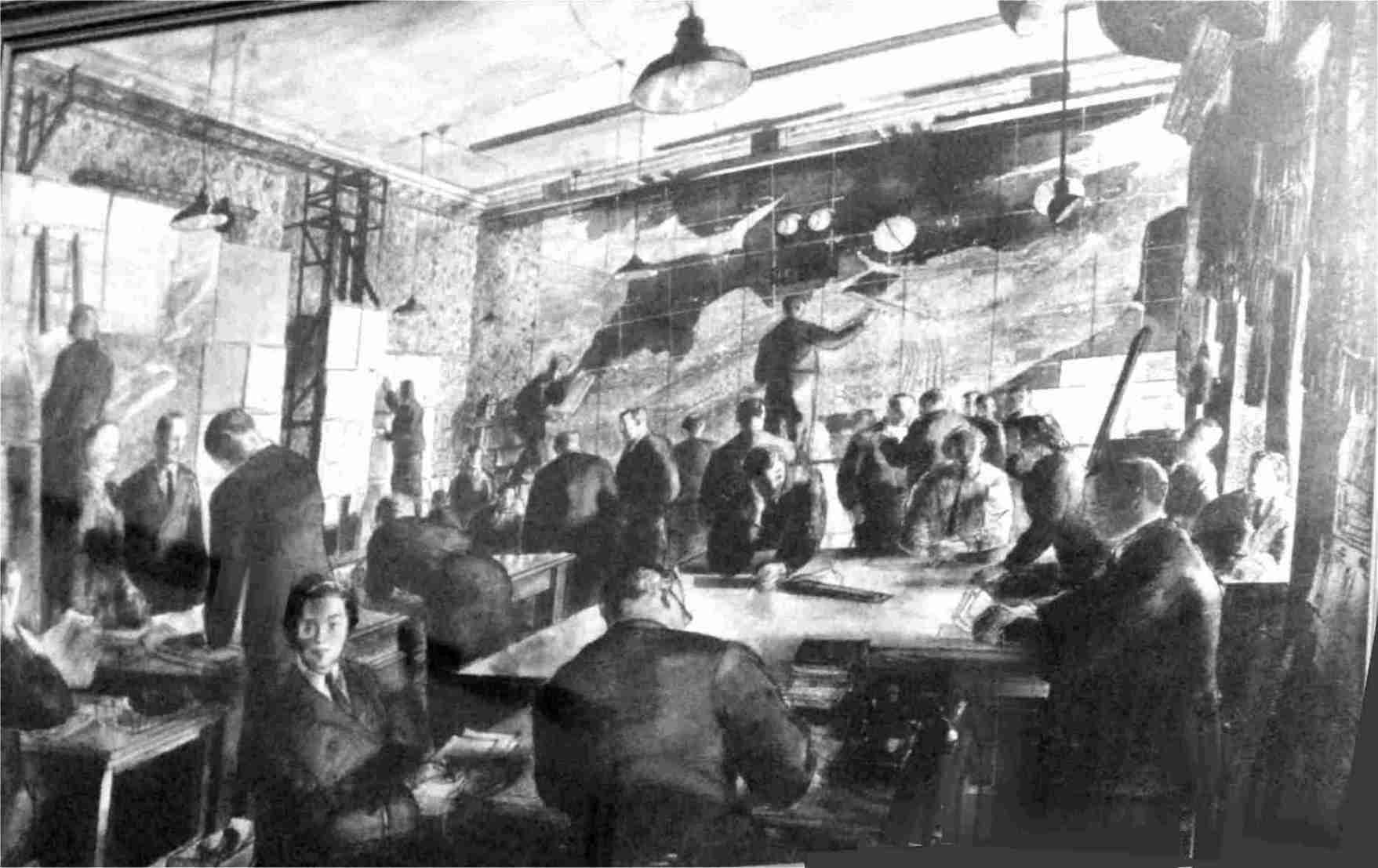
Drawing of Southwick House map room, 1944

The Royal Navy team was Commander Geoffrey Wolfe and New Zealander Lieutenant Commander Lawrence Hogben. Hogben recalled that "We six never agreed on anything except that Stagg was not a good meteorologist and that he was a bit of a glory hound". At heart a geophysicist, Stagg was appointed as SHAEF weatherman for his administrative skills to co-ordinate Army and RAF forecasting; he had only two years experience of forecasting in the Iraqi desert. The civilian Met Office team was Charles K. M. Douglas and Norwegian Sverre Petterssen of the Norwegian Air Force. Douglas had told USAAF commanders Spaatz and Doolittle in 1942 that "a forecast for more than a day or two ahead in this country can be nothing more than speculation".

The USAAF team was Irving P. Krick and Ben Holtzman. Hogben thought their forecasts for daylight bombing runs over Germany made by looking at forty years of weather maps were "pure bunk", and the Norwegian Petterssen thought that Krick was "talking nonsense" in claiming reliable forecasts for up to five days. Pre-war, they had forecast for Hollywood film studios (e.g., the "burning of Atlanta" scene in the 1939 film Gone with the Wind). Krick (a physics graduate and college professor) was regarded by his rivals as "brash" and "a salesman to his fingertips". Donald Yates was a former student of Krick. The American team was based at the USAAF facility Widewing used for SHAEF HQ at Camp Griffiss in Bushy Park near Teddington.

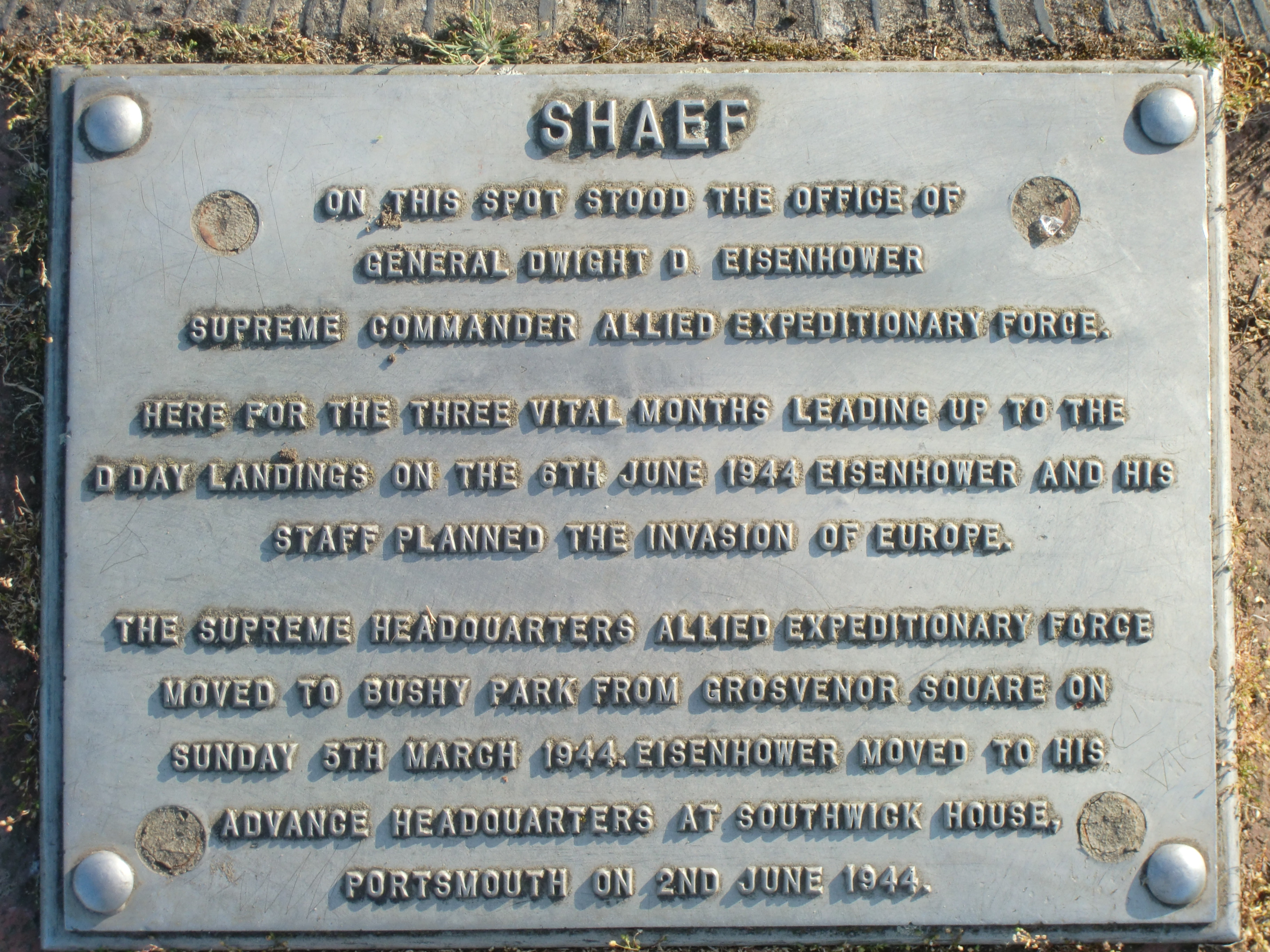
SHAEF memorial on the site of Eisenhower's tent

== Tidal predictions ==
A full moon was desirable, as it would provide illumination for aircraft pilots and have the highest tides. Having the landings shortly before dawn, midway between low and high tide, with the tide coming in would improve visibility of obstacles the enemy had placed on the beach while minimising the time the men spent exposed in the open. Specific criteria were set for wind speed, visibility, and cloud cover. The previous night had to be reasonably light (moonlight) for darkened convoys; although airborne troops needed a full or nearly full moon but late-rising so with darkness until they were dropped.

The invasion zone tidal range was about 23 ft (7m) and the landings should be on a rising tide to allow landing craft to run aground, unload and then withdraw without becoming stranded. Landings had to be at about the same time on all beaches to avoid later arrivals meeting an alerted enemy, and Omaha had an exposed tidal flat of 300 yards (275m) to cross. It was decided that the assault should be one hour after low tide and within one hour of first light. Arthur Doodson, head of the Liverpool Tidal Institute, advised the Royal Navy on European coastal areas, and was asked in October 1943 by Commander Ian Farquharson to make tidal predictions for Normandy, which was disguised as "Position Z". He created two tide-prediction machines. The required light and tidal conditions occurred for only six days a month, and when strong moonlight for airborne operations was added, there were only three days per month.

== Choice of date for Overlord ==
Originally 1 May 1944 was proposed at the Trident Conference attended by Roosevelt and Churchill in May 1943, but when the invasion force was expanded from landing three divisions to landing five divisions (as proposed by Eisenhower and Montgomery), it was delayed to acquire the extra landing craft needed. This allowed more time for air attacks on the defences. Suitable dates were 21–23 May, 5–7 June, 19–21 June and 3–5 July 1944 according to Admiral Alan Kirk.

At the Tehran Conference in November–December 1943, Thursday 1 June 1944 was tentatively chosen. For long-term planning, it was called Y-day, so D-day must be Y plus 4, 5 or 6. As the assault machinery must be set in motion two days before the event, D-day must be decided by Y plus 2. For early June, there were only three days (5, 6 and 7 June). For H-Hour (the hour of landing), one hour of daylight was needed beforehand. Stagg had said they might have to wait 150 years for the perfect weather which would please everyone, and also that a full moon and early low tide could be guaranteed on 4, 5, 6 and 7 June.

On 17 May 1944, Eisenhower chose 5 June, which allowed for a possible postponement of one or two days, although the convoys might have to be refuelled for 7 June. For 5 June, units from the north would have to depart on 3 June to arrive in time. The first to depart were the blockships to be sunk off the Normandy coast that sailed south from their Scottish ports on 31 May 1944. Due to bad weather on 5 June, the operation was postponed by a day to 6 June, and then a slight break in the weather was predicted. As many ships had to depart one or two days beforehand, some were held at sea. The bad weather had led German commanders to rule out an invasion then, so the Allied landings took them by surprise.

The next suitable dates with the right combination of tides (but without a full moon, desirable for the airborne troops) would have been 18 to 20 June. On 17 June, the team forecasts were all for good weather, but on 18 June the worst storm in forty years arrived, which would have made the initial landings impossible. Eisenhower later said to Stagg: "I thank the gods of war we went when we did".

== Monday 29 May to Wednesday 31 May ==
Weather conditions were excellent on the 20th, and Stagg gave an optimistic long-range forecast for the first week of June. Ramsay noted "another boiling hot day" on Tuesday but "slightly cooler" on Wednesday.

== Thursday 1 June ==
The first coded messages (about 160; repeated on the 2nd and 3rd ) over the BBC's Radio Londres told the French Resistance that the invasion was expected in two weeks, e.g. the quote inspired by Paul Verlaine's 1866 poem "Chanson d'automne" and sung by Charles Trenet: "Les sanglots longs des violons d'automne" ("The long sobs of autumn violins"). It was intercepted by the Germans at 1:20 pm. Il fait chaud à Suez ("It's hot in Suez") initiated the widespread launching of disruptive guerrilla operations. Admiral Ramsay noted "A dull morning, Overcast with slight rain. Cooler. No doubt the general lull is but a precursor of the storm to follow."

== Friday 2 June ==
May had been consistently fine, but less favourable weather was predicted for D-Day, with indications that the relatively quiet weather might end about 6 June. After discussion with his commanders, Eisenhower decided to keep existing orders. So Bombarding Force D sailed from the Clyde, and HMZ Nelson left Scapa for Milford Haven. Two midget submarines X-20 & X-23 left; they were to mark Sword and Juno beaches for Forces S and J (Operation Gambit). Admiral Ramsay noted "1000 hours. Commander's meeting at which main topic was the change for the worse in weather, affecting air (operations) generally and the carriage of airborne troops in particular." The Blacksod lighthouse in neutral Ireland had reported a rapidly falling barometer and a Force Six wind.

Stagg conferred and argued (without agreement) with the other meteorological centres over secure landlines. To Stagg, "Had it not been fraught with such potential tragedy, the whole business was ridiculous. In less than half an hour I was expected to present to General Eisenhower an "agreed" forecast for the next five days which covered the time of launching of the greatest military operation ever mounted; no two of the expert participants in the discussion could agree on the likely weather even for the next 24 hours." At the 21:30 evening meeting, Eisenhower asked Stagg, "Well, Stagg, what have you got for us this time?" He followed his instincts, overlooking the optimistic American team, saying "The whole situation from the British Isles to Newfoundland has been transformed in recent days and is now potentially full of menace". Some officers glanced out the window at the beautiful sunset, slightly bewildered (on Double British Summer Time, it was still light; France was an hour behind). Asked by Eisenhower about the likely situation on 6 and 7 June; he replied after a pause, "If I answered that, Sir, I would be guessing, not behaving as your meteorological advisor".

Then Stagg and Yates left and withdrew to their tented sleeping quarters; the sky was almost clear, and everything around was quiet. Later that night Eisenhower was told by his aide Harry Butcher about the message accidentally put out by Associated Press (picked up by CBS and Radio Moscow) that "Eisenhower's forces are landing in France"; the agency cancelled it 23 minutes later.

== Saturday 3 June ==
In the morning, Stagg was "all but physically nauseated" by the weather charts and the teams' different analyses. He said to the commanders at 21:30 hours, "Gentlemen, the fears my colleagues and I had yesterday about the weather for the next three or four days have been confirmed" and gave a detailed forecast of rough seas, winds up to force six and low cloud. All seemed temporarily stunned; Eisenhower was motionless and had to recommend a provisional postponement.

By the afternoon the weather had deteriorated, to the dismay of the Southwick House meeting at 16:15. The two British teams predicted a sudden and serious decline with storms that would rule out air support and could make landing treacherous, though the American team thought better weather was in the offing for 5 June. Petterssen presented his own weather map showing a violent storm brewing. And Ramsay noted that "The report was bad"; the low cloud predicted would prohibit the use of airborne troops and most air action (including air spotting for naval gunfire). The sea conditions were "unpromising but not prohibitive".

Stagg did not get a consensus, so told Eisenhower on 3 June that the weather two days hence was unlikely to meet the Overlord planners' requirements. At the meeting Tedder was against going and Ramsay was neutral. But Montgomery was insistent on going "regardless of casualties or air support", he was opposed by Ramsay and the airmen Tedder and Leigh-Mallory. So Eisenhower postponed a go-no go decision until dawn on Sunday 4 June. Messages e.g. "Bowsprit" or "Regatta postponed 24 hours" were to go out, some were not received until 4 June. Convoy U2A from Salcombe and Dartmouth left on 4 June for Utah Beach but did not receive the broadcast recall notices, and was headed for France alone (causing panic in the Southwick House operations room). A search by two destroyers was unsuccessful, then a Walrus reconnaissance biplane located the convoy after an all-day search and dropped two coded messages in canisters; the second one was acknowledged when the convoy was 30 miles south of the Isle of Wight and 36 miles from Normandy, after sailing 150 miles at 6 knots. The convoy of about 150 vessels was carrying the 4th Infantry Division of Major-General Raymond O. Barton, and had to be hastily refuelled at Portland.

That night Stagg said that there was good news; there should be a brief break in the bad weather that caused the postponement, but that he would know more in the morning. Ramsay noted that "from midday on the 4th, the weather got progressively worse" and "No enemy reaction" (as they had no air patrols). He got some vessels refuelled.

== Sunday 4 June ==
By the morning of 4 June 1944 at the 4:15 briefing, conditions were clearly unsuitable for a landing; high winds and heavy seas made it impossible to launch landing craft, and low clouds would prevent aircraft from finding their targets. Ramsay recorded that while the sea conditions were 'unpromising but not prohibitive", the predicted low cloud would prohibit the use of airborne troops (and) the majority of air action including air spotting for naval gunfire. At 13:30 de Gaulle was told of the Overlord plans by Churchill aboard Churchill's armoured train near Portsmouth; he was "revolted at not being informed earlier". Churchill had commandeered the royal train and was lurking nearby at Droxford railway station; "unhelpfully breathing down everyone's necks".

Two more weather conferences were held on 4 June, at 17:15 and 21:00. Despite the hard wind outside, Stagg and the team of meteorologists advised that the wind could improve to winds of up to 18 mph (29 km/h) or force 3–4 on the Beaufort scale; a basic requirement for landing craft.

At the 21:00 (9 pm) meeting, rain and wind were battering the windows, but Stagg said: "Gentlemen, since I presented the forecast last evening some rapid and unexpected developments have occurred over the North Atlantic". With a brief improvement from Monday afternoon, the weather would not be ideal, but it would do. Ramsay made it clear that if Overlord proceeded on Tuesday, he would need to issue provisional warnings within the next half-hour, but if they restarted and were recalled again, there was no question of continuing on Wednesday. Petterssen predicted a 36-hour gap of acceptable weather (some later American accounts ignore the American teams' proposal to go on the 5th, and credit them with seeing the improved weather gap on the 6th).

Ramsay wrote that "we decided to take a chance and go ahead; while the grounds were not good it seemed to be Tuesday – or not this week at all" and Eisenhower said "I'm quite positive we must give the order. I don't like it, but there it is. I don't see how we can possibly do anything else"; but it was to be confirmed at a last early-morning conference.

== Monday 5 June ==
Eisenhower moved his Advance Command Post (nicknamed Sharper) near Southwick House. He wrote of "wind of almost hurricane proportions shaking and shuddering his Sharpener camp (and) it seemed impossible that in such conditions there was any reason for even discussing the situation." At four in the morning, the final go/no-go conference was held. Stagg told them, "Some good news. Gentlemen, no substantial change has taken place since last time, but as I see it, the little has changed is in the direction of optimism ... as the predicted good weather should last until tomorrow, with good visibility and winds not more than Force 4." Ramsay noted 'this time the prophets came in smiling, and Hogben mused "I was scared of getting it wrong ... we knew we were making history".

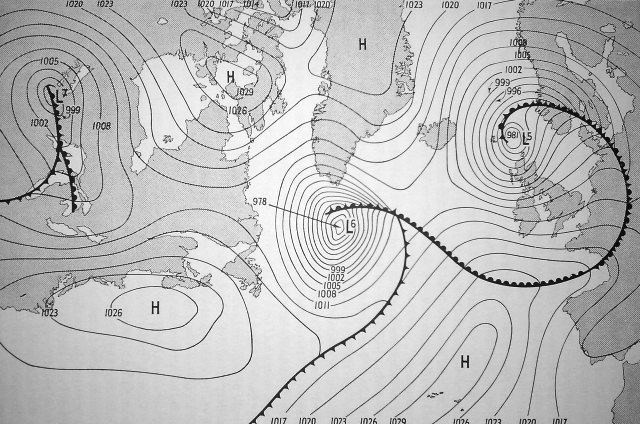
Weather map over the Atlantic Ocean on 5 June 1944

Eisenhower's three commanders, Ramsay, Leigh-Mallory and Montgomery, all advised: "Go". Montgomery and Major General Walter Bedell Smith, Eisenhower's chief of staff, were eager to launch the invasion. Admiral Bertram Ramsay was prepared to commit his ships, while Air Chief Marshal Trafford Leigh-Mallory expressed concern that the conditions would be unfavourable for Allied aircraft. After much discussion and considering in silence for some minutes; at 4:15 am Eisenhower said "OK, We'll go". (Note: Other versions say Eisenhower said "OK, We'll go on 6 June", or "OK, lets go" or "We will sail tomorrow.") (Note: One author says that on 5 June before he gave the "Go" message, Eisenhower received a message couriered from Bletchley Park sent by Hitler to Rommel, with battle orders that the invasion of Normandy was imminent but that it was a feint to draw troops away from the real invasion five days later against the Channel ports. Sent in a "Fish" radio message decrypted by Colossus, according to an account by Tommy Flowers. Another author doubts whether Hitler would have sent messages about the invasion then, which had sailed on 4 June but was then postponed for 24 hours, and as even with Colossus Fish decrypts could take days or weeks. He thinks that Flowers may have embellished or misremembered the story in later life. Hitler's views on the real invasion are widely attributed to the message from the Japanese ambassador to Berlin, Oshima, after a 27 May meeting. And anyway, in the first week of June 1944, Eisenhower was more concerned with the weather than with whether the Germans had been misled about the invasion's location.)The room filled with cheering, and Stagg thinks they "look like new men. It was a marvel to behold." After a few questions to Stagg, they dispersed, and Stagg headed for his tent in the Southwick House grounds to get some sleep.

At midday, Eisenhower was playing a game of draughts in his trailer with his aide Harry Butcher; he was losing, but at 12:30 pm he managed a draw, which he saw as a good omen. Eisenhower and Admiral Creasy went to Stagg's office at 4:00 pm; concerned that the sky was still cloudy and the wind was still up. Stagg says reassuringly, "They are coming along, sir; there'll be good breaks in the cloud by dark tonight and reduced winds." He showed Eisenhower the latest weather chart, and Eisenhower put his hand on his shoulder and said, "Good, Stagg: keep it up a little longer". At 9:00 pm (21:00) Stagg is relieved to see breaks in the cloud overhead; his prediction seems to be coming true. At 9 am he confirms the 4:15 am forecast to Bull.

The second coded message over the BBC's Radio Londres from 21:15 warned the French Resistance that the invasion would start in 24 to 48 hours; a message to begin sabotage operations. Many messages (about 270) were sent out, including the famous line inspired by Paul Verlaine's poem Chanson d'automne Bercent mon Coeur / d'une langueur / monotone, or Rock my heart with a monotonous languor. The message (intercepted at 9:33 pm) went to OKW in Berchtesgaden, but stopped on General Jodl's desk; he distrusted the source (Helmut Meyer at 15th Army HQ in France) and did not send out a general alert. Speidel at Rommel's headquarters was also told by the Operations desk that von Salmuth had put Fifteenth Army on alert, but Spiedel said to Staubwasser to call OB West and to "go with what they say"; Operations Officer there Bodo Zimmermann said that because of the weather Seventh Army need not be alerted, so the army defending Normandy was not alerted.

At German Seventh Army headquarters Max Pemsel sent a message that officers going to a "Kriegspiel" (wargame) at Rennes should not leave for Rennes before dawn on 6 June, as there would be evidence of a landing before daylight. Von Rundstedt in Paris thinks that there is no immediate prospect for the "Grossinvasion" and at 10 pm when General Blumentritt tells him that Fifteenth Army Intelligence (now under the SS) has received the second line of the Verlaine poem, he said that Eisenhower would not announce the invasion over the BBC and to pass it onto OKW and to Blaskowitz but not to order a general alert of the two armies along the coast: "No, especially not in this weather". Bodo Zimmermann at OB West distrusts the BBC message when told by an "agitated" Major Doertenback at 9:30 pm, but shortly, when Major Brink says that Colonel Reile has recently intercepted other trigger messages, he decides to act, calling von Rundstedt, who authorises a warning message to all commands (not an alert), saying Heeresgruppe B should go to Alarmstufe II and other commands are to increase their vigilance. In Cherbourg, Admiral Hennecke had been told of foul weather for several days, but at about 11:30 pm he was told of heavy air raids and, about ten minutes later, of 50 or 60 twin-engined aircraft approaching the Cherbourg Peninsula; he broke up the musical evening they were attending. The German Navy had cancelled its usual patrol and minelaying operations for the night of 5–6 June. Allied planners had assumed that the departure of the landing force would be known to the enemy by at least H-12 (twelve hours before the first scheduled landing) and its destination would be clear to them by H-4, but this did not occur, partly due to the weather.

Churchill sent a message to the impatient Stalin: "Eisenhower forced to postpone for one day, but the weather forecast has undergone a most favourable change, and tonight we go". Stalin had been told in November that the invasion would take place by 1 May; and had mocked the plans to Milovan Djilas on 5 June, saying that it would be called off "if there's fog in the Channel".

== Tuesday 6 June ==
Airborne troops took off shortly before midnight. Pathfinders jumped at 00:10 to mark landing zones, and Horsa gliders landed from 00:15 as part of Operation Tonga, which was to capture the Pegasus and Horsa bridges over the Caen Canal and Orne River.

American troops started landing on the French coast at H-Hour, or 6:30 am: Utah Beach at 6:31 and Omaha Beach at 6:35. British troops landed on Gold and Sword Beaches at 7:25. Canadian troops landed on Juno Beach at 7:45, delayed from 7:35 by heavy swell and poor visibility; the amphibious tanks arrived 15 minutes after the infantry. The infantry landings were completed by 9 pm (21:00), with 34,000 men ashore.

The BBC announced that Allied Armies have started landing "on the northern coast of France" at 9:32 am, Read by John Snagge, the actual location was not given. (Note: Hitler and many of his military advisors thought that even if the Normandy landing was not a feint, it would be followed by a larger landing in the Pas-de-Calais area; see Operation Fortitude.) The sun rose at 5:58 and set at 22:07, with a full moon and heavy clouds across the Cotentin Peninsula, but later the low cloud lifted. Winds reached force 5 (22 mph/35 km/h) but by day's end had dropped to force 4 (16 mph/26 km/h). When the sun rose, the sky was grey, but by late morning sunny spells appeared and the temperature reached 15 °C.

== Aftermath ==
Had Eisenhower postponed the invasion, the next available period with the right combination of tides (but without the desirable full moon for airborne troops) would have been two weeks later, from 18 to 20 June. But during this window a major storm, a "one in forty years event" would have made the landings impossible. A depression pushing north from the Mediterranean met a cold front sweeping south-east from Iceland, causing a devastating storm lasting four days between 19 and 22 June, and of only slightly less ferocity than the February 1905 storm on the Calvados coast. Hogben stated: "On 17 June, all six of us produced a forecast for the nineteenth for almost perfect conditions (but the invasion) would have been a complete catastrophe." Waiting until July was "too bitter to contemplate". They would have had to return the troops on the ships back to their bases in England (and probably isolate them). The damage done to the Mulberry harbour off the American beach showed the power of the storm.

Eisenhower said when visiting Bradley on 20 July that "When I die they can hold my body for a rainy day and bury me during a thunderstorm for this weather will be the death of me yet"; France was experiencing torrential rain plus mist and low clouds blanketing Normandy for several days, causing seemingly endless postponements.

== Weather data ==
Stagg and the teams based the forecast of weather improvements for June 6 on reports from a single weather ship 600 miles (1100 km) west of Ireland, reporting a rising barometer, and from a lighthouse keeper at the Blacksod Lighthouse in County Mayo, in neutral northwest Ireland. Under a secret 1939 deal between Dublin and the Met Office in Dunstable, lighthouse keeper Ted Sweeney phoned on 4 June "heavy rain and drizzle cleared, cloud at nine hundred feet and visibility on land and sea very clear". He was asked to confirm immediately and also an hour later; he never realised that they were checking the weather for the invasion. On 2 June Sweeney had reported bad weather; a rapidly falling barometer and a Force Six wind. Hogben wrote: "We used data gathered from special recce (reconnaissance) flights, ship observations, UK weather sites and pinched what we could from the Germans – once we broke their weather codes – and redrew our charts every few hours. None of us was operating with any of the technology and equipment that our successors today take for granted, such as satellites, weather radar, computer modelling and instant communications, and predicting conditions more than a day or two in advance was hazardous. All we knew was that there were several storms blowing across the Atlantic towards us, any one of which would have whipped up the waters where the fleet was gathering, and provided unwelcome cloud over Normandy". There is evidence that the USAAF team telephoned the Met Office team to request a change to their initial unfavourable forecast for the 5th, but the Met Office team demurred. Hogben and the other forecasters later received the Bronze Star.

In 2020, Maureen Flavin Sweeney was acknowledged by the United States government for her role in weather forecasting from Blacksod, which directly influenced the operation's schedule. Sweeney's weather report from 3 June 1944, showing rapidly decreasing pressure, contributed to Eisenhower's decision to delay the landings by 24 hours. This was credited with saving the lives of numerous soldiers during the landing. Unbeknownst to Sweeney, the hourly weather reports she sent to the Irish Met Service from the post office where she worked as an assistant were forwarded to the Allied Expeditionary Force in England. Sweeney was contacted directly by someone from England to confirm the reported readings. She was presented with a special US House of Representatives honour in June 2020. Sweeney went on to marry the lighthouse keeper, Ted, and only became aware of their involvement in the delay of the landings in 1956.

== German forecasters ==
In 1961, while en route to his inauguration, JFK asked Eisenhower what gave him the edge on D-Day; he replied, "Because we had better meteorologists (or weather forecasters) than the Germans."

Allied control of the Atlantic meant that German meteorologists did not have access to as much information as the Allies on incoming weather patterns. As the Luftwaffe meteorological centre in Paris predicted two weeks of stormy weather, many Wehrmacht commanders left their posts to attend war games in Rennes, and men in many units were given leave. Marshal Erwin Rommel returned to Germany for his wife's birthday, and to meet Hitler to try to get more Panzers.

When Rommel consulted meteorologist Major Heinz Lettau at Army Group B, he was advised that there could be no invasion in the next two weeks because of the weather. However, some German forecasters had foreseen poor conditions on 4 and 5 June, with conditions moderating on 6 June. The forecast of Professor Werner Schwerdtfeger of the Luftwaffe centre at Potsdam for D-Day of "prevailing winds of Beaufort Force five, varying between four and six" was similar to Stagg's. They expected Allied landings at or near high tide to minimise the "killing zone" or before dawn under cover of darkness; so a full moon featured less in their calculations, and they thought that Allies would not risk landing in winds worse than Force three (8–12 mph or 13–19 km/h). But Ramsay accepted Force four winds (13–18 mph or 21–29 km/h), and had on 4 June labelled worse sea conditions "unpromising but not prohibitive". And OB West and the Luftwaffe used tides for the Pas-de-Calais rather than the different tides for Normandy. German maritime patrols out of Cherbourg had been cancelled because of the weather.

Professor Walter Stube, the Luftwaffe meteorologist in Paris, no longer received Atlantic weather data from Jan Mayen Land, Sabin Island in Greenland and Spitsbergen, so he was dependent on information from Luftwaffe pilots returning from missions at sea. He had noticed that previous Allied invasions (e.g. Italy) required a guarantee of fine weather. He discussed by phone on the 4th with meteorologist Major Hermann Mueller at von Rundstedt's headquarters in Paris, who had data suggesting that an airborne operation would be possible and a seaborne landing conceivable, although Channel conditions were far from ideal. But they agreed that an imminent landing was highly unlikely, although Mueller would review it later that day when additional data was received from Le Havre. Rommel also agreed, and wondered why the Allies had not used the three periods of fine weather in May. So he decided to leave for Germany that morning. However Erich Marcks had said on 2 June that "If I know the British ... they'll go to church next Sunday for one last time, and come Monday (i.e. 5 June). After Tuesday they won't have another chance for the tides until June 28–29". He also expected the landings to be at Normandy rather than Calais (von Rundstedt) or the Somme estuary (Rommel).

== See also ==
- North Atlantic weather war
- Weather events during wars
- Turbulence, a 2009 novel about the meteorological preparations for D-Day
- Pressure, a 2026 film about the weather analysis that went into the schedule decision for the Normandy landings
- Pressure, a 2014 play set in Southwick House, about the events before D-Day
- Verlaine Message Museum (in Tourcoing, France)
