= Jean Oberlé =

French painter

Jean Oberlé (13 January 1900, Brest - 2 March 1961, Paris) was a French painter who became a member of the French Resistance.

Born in Brest in 1900, he illustrated a number of contemporary books and worked for different Parisian newspapers and magazines, of which le Crapouillot was the most important.

He won the Prix Blumenthal in 1934.

In 1940, he was at the BBC's Broadcasting House with Jean Marin when General de Gaulle made his famous speech on 18 June 1940 calling on the French to resist.

During the Second World War, he became one of the main French speakers on Radio Londres, the Free French broadcasts of the BBC. He created many of the famous slogans of the BBC Free French broadcast, in particular: « Radio Paris ment, Radio Paris ment, Radio Paris est allemand» ("Radio Paris is lying, Radio Paris is lying, Radio Paris is German").

== Publications ==
=== Books ===
- Images anglaises, ou l'Angleterre occupée, Hachette, 1942;
- "Jean Oberlé vous parle ... ", souvenirs de cinq années à Londres, avec sept dessins de l'auteur, La Jeune Parque, 1945;
- Pages choisies de Pierre Bourdan, introduction de Jean Oberlé, Magnard, 1951;
- Utrillo Montmartre, Hazan, 1956;
- La vie d'artiste (souvenirs)", illustrations de l'auteur, Denoel, 1956.

=== Illustrations ===
- Lewis & Irène, de Paul Morand, Eaux fortes hors texte en couleurs de Jean Oberlé, tirées par Roger Lacourière (Editions Emile-Paul Frères, 1925.);
- Les Nuits de Walpurgis, de Maurice Dekobra, avec 12 eaux-fortes de Jean Oberlé (Editions Baudinière, 1926);
- La Touraine, de René Boylesve, frontispice de Jean Oberlé (Editions Emile-Paul Frères, Portrait de la France n°4, 1926);
- La Pucelle de Belleville, de Paul de Kock (MP. Trémois, Paris, 1927);
- Amour, amour,…, de Pierre Veber (Les arts et le livre, 1928);
- La Vie de garçon, de Jean Galtier, avec 8 eaux-fortes et des illustrations de Jean Oberlé (Mornay, 1929);
- La Belle Amour, de Jean Galtier (Librairie Gund, 1945);
- Traversée de Paris, de Marcel Aymé, avec des gravures de Jean Oberlé (Édition de la Gallerie Charpentier, Paris, 1946)
- Le Capitaine Conan, de Roger Vercel (Monte-Carlo, Editions du Livre, 1946);
- Les Linottes, de Georges Courteline (Nouvelle Librairie de France, 1948);
- Couverture du n° de juin 1932 de Vanity Fair, représentant Paul von Hindenburg.

=== Paintings ===
- Portrait du Général de Montsabert (huile sur toile, musée des beaux-arts de Bordeaux);
- Le port de Saint-Guénolé (huile sur Isorel, musée des beaux-arts de Nantes);
- Marine en Bretagne (huile sur Isorel, musée des beaux-arts de Quimper);
- Portrait de Max Jacob (plume sur papier, musée des beaux-arts de Quimper).

== See also ==
French Wikipedia Wikipedia Discussion Wikipedia page on Radio Londres
