= Thomas Cadett =

British journalist (1898–1982)

Thomas Cadett CBE (7 June 1898 – 31 March 1982) was a British journalist for The Times and was later a BBC Radio correspondent based in Paris. who worked for the Special Operations Executive.

== Life and career ==
Thomas Tucker-Edwardes Cadett was born in London on 7 June 1898, the son of Herbert Cadett and educated at News College, Worthing and at Cranleigh.

He joined a Territorial Battalion of the Middlesex Regiment in 1914 and later attended the Royal Military College, Sandhurst. He joined the staff of The Times in 1924 and worked in many different departments, at one stage being the assistant to the Foreign Editor. In 1931, he covered the beginning of the Second Spanish Republic. In July 1937, he was appointed chief correspondent in Paris. In 1940, he covered the German invasion of France. The same year he began his war service and worked for the F section of the Special Operations Executive (SOE) until 1942. He recruited Georges Bégué He flew into Berlin to cover the Nazi surrender in 1945, ending a radio dispatch minutes after the end of World War II in Europe with the following words: "some of us admitted to a certain temptation to pity for the conquered, but each time memories from Warsaw and Buchenwald came crowding in - to bring the realisation that this was justice; that pity was a selfish and sentimental notion". He watched the official signing of the surrender at a schoolhouse in Rheims, northeastern France, which served as the advance headquarters of the supreme commander in Europe, General Dwight D. Eisenhower. Cadett said the signing, was carried out "on a cold and businesslike basis." After the signing, he said General Gustav Jodl, of Germany, spoke to say the Germans had given themselves up "for better or worse into the victors' hands". His pieces began 'Hello London' as was the style at the time. He also covered the trial of Marshal Philippe Pétain He retired from the BBC in 1963. He lived in Alcester, Warwickshire with his Swedish wife Hellis until he died. He was made OBE in 1956 and CBE in 1962.
