= Lawrence Hogben =

New Zealand-born Royal Navy officer and meteorologist

Lawrence Hogben DSC
- Born: George Lawrence Hogben; 14 April 1916; Auckland, New Zealand
- Died: 20 January 2015 (aged 98); Crest, Drôme, France
- Education: Auckland University; Oxford University; Imperial College London
- Occupations: Royal Navy officer Meteorologist
- Awards: Distinguished Service Cross (1942); Bronze Star Medal (1944)

Lawrence Hogben DSC (14 April 1916 – 20 January 2015) was a New Zealand-born Royal Navy officer and meteorologist who provided vital weather forecasts for the Allied D-Day landings in Normandy in 1944. Hogben was also involved in the hunt for the Kriegsmarine battleship Bismarck in 1941 and served during the Battle of the Barents Sea in 1942, ultimately earning the Distinguished Service Cross and the American Bronze Star Medal for his wartime service. After World War II, Hogben found employment as a civilian meteorologist before working for Imperial Chemical Industries in multiple postings across Europe. In his later life, he retired to southern France and was an active member of Rotary International.

== Early life and education ==
Hogben was born George Lawrence Hogben in Auckland, New Zealand, in 1916. He attended Auckland Grammar School, graduating in 1933, and went on to study mathematics at Auckland University College. Hogben received the highest final grade for mathematics in New Zealand upon his graduation in 1938, and was subsequently awarded a Rhodes Scholarship to Oxford University.

== World War II ==
Upon the outbreak of World War II in 1939, Hogben joined the Royal Navy directly from Oxford as an instructor-lieutenant. He studied at the Royal Naval College, Greenwich, and served for three years as an intelligence officer, radar operator and meteorologist aboard the cruiser HMS Sheffield. In 1941, Hogben joined the newly formed Royal New Zealand Navy, though he continued to serve aboard British ships.

=== Hunt for the Bismarck ===
On 24 May 1941, the German battleship Bismarck sank the British battlecruiser HMS Hood at the Battle of the Denmark Strait. Hogben's cruiser, HMS Sheffield, was among the Royal Navy vessels subsequently tasked to pursue and destroy the Bismarck. Hogben detected the German battleship on his radar, and reported its location for the Navy's torpedo bombers. However, on 26 May, the Sheffield itself was briefly mistaken for the Bismarck and targeted by aircraft from the aircraft carrier HMS Ark Royal, whose torpedoes narrowly missed the Sheffield. Later that day, Hogben assisted the bombers in pinpointing the Bismarck's location, and he witnessed its destruction on 27 May.

=== Battle of the Barents Sea ===
On 31 December 1942, Hogben's HMS Sheffield participated in the Battle of the Barents Sea, in which a force of British cruisers and destroyers successfully defended a merchant convoy against multiple German warships, including the heavy cruiser Admiral Hipper. Hogben served as the chief officer of the Sheffield's radar plotting office during the battle, and was awarded a Distinguished Service Cross for his efforts to locate and target the German ships amid a heavy snowstorm.

=== D-Day preparations ===
In the summer of 1944, Hogben joined the teams of Allied meteorologists based at Southwick, Hampshire, who were involved in the planning of Operation Neptune, the amphibious invasion of German-occupied Normandy. He was on the Naval team with both Royal Navy meteorologists and civilian consultants, including Americans who had previously provided weather forecasts for Hollywood film directors; see Weather forecasting for Operation Overlord. He thought that the leader of the three teams, Group Captain James Stagg was self-important and a "glory hound".

The Operation Neptune commander, General Dwight D. Eisenhower, initially planned to begin the Normandy landings on 5 June, due to the coincidence of a full moon and low tide. However, after extensive debate, Hogben and his colleagues convinced Eisenhower to launch the invasion on 6 June instead, to avoid storm conditions that could potentially have crippled the Allied fleet. After the success of the D-Day landings, Hogben received the Bronze Star Medal for his meteorological advice.

== Postwar career ==
After the war, Hogben worked in the film industry as a meteorologist for the Rank Organisation, and earned a PhD from Imperial College London. Thereafter, he spent 35 years working in various roles for Imperial Chemical Industries, with postings across Britain and Europe. Upon Hogben's retirement, he was refused British citizenship, as he had not resided in the UK long enough to be eligible. He thus settled in the town of Crest in the Drôme region of southern France, where he lived until his death in 2015.

== Personal life ==
Hogben married Elaine Carter, who he met while studying at Oxford; she predeceased him in 2010. Hogben and his wife were survived by their children, Sandra and Julius. Hogben was a fluent speaker of French, German, Spanish and Russian. During his retirement in Crest, he was an active Rotarian and helped establish a local goat's cheese festival. In 2004, Hogben was made an honorary citizen of Crest for his role in the Allied liberation of France. Hogben retained his New Zealand passport throughout his life.

== See also ==
- Weather forecasting for Operation Overlord
