= Jean Marin =

French journalist (1909–1995)

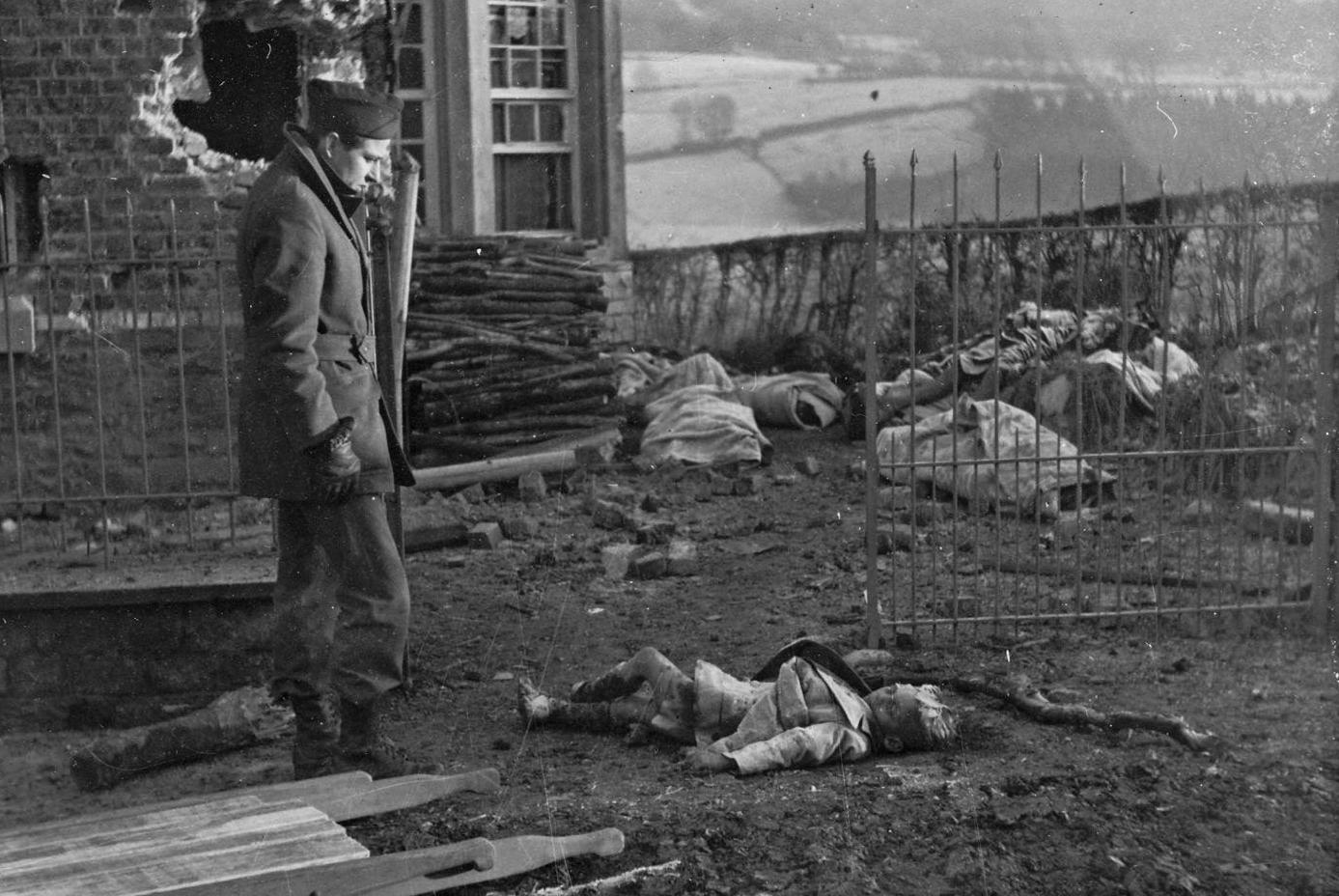
- Marin looks at bodies of civilians massacred at the Legaye house in Stavelot, Belgium.
- Born: Yves Morvan; 24 February 1909; Douarnenez
- Died: 3 June 1995 (aged 86); Paris
- Occupations: Journalist; Resistant

Jean Marin, real name Yves Morvan (24 February 1909 – 3 March 1995) was a French journalist and resistant. He was the president of Agence France-Presse from 1957 to 1975.

Marin joined Free France from June 1940 when he was a correspondent for Havas agency in London for a year. Until 1943, he was one of the voices of Free France on the BBC radio station, in the famous show listened to clandestinely across the British Channel, Les Français parlent aux Français. In 1944, he joined the second armored division of Marshal Leclerc who freed Paris on 25 August. After the capture of Rennes, he was in charge of restarting Radio Brittany and was appointed director by General de Gaulle. He also participated in the birth of the newspaper Ouest-France in succession to L'Ouest-Éclair.

After a passage on the daily newspaper, Les Nouvelles du matin, he arrived at the AFP as general director. Jean Marin, one of the artisans of the statute that gave its autonomy to the AFP (law of 10 January 1957), was elected president of the Agency in 1957. Embodying the independence of the AFP and highly appreciated for its journalistic sense, he was re-elected every three years until 1975. He then left journalism to work in advertising, in Publicis, TVCS then Havas

Marin wrote the script for the Norwegian-French 1948-movie Operation Swallow: The Battle for Heavy Water, based upon his own short story Why the germans didn't get their atom bomb.

Marin was awarded the 1995 Prix Cazes for his novel Petit bois pour un grand feu, published by Fayard.
