= Verlaine Message Museum =

Museum in Tourcoing, France

Coordinates: 50.711891°N 3.1551877°E

The Verlaine Message Museum or Museum of 5 June 1944 is a historical museum founded in 1991 in Tourcoing, France, near Lille. It is named after the message sent by the BBC's Radio Londres at 9:15 pm on June 5, 1944 announcing the imminent invasion of Normandy. The museum is housed in the concrete bunker where the German Wehrmacht intercepted the message.

== History ==
Following the Battle of France, the German 15th Army established its headquarters at Tourcoing. The 15th Army was deployed in Normandy and the Netherlands. The headquarters consisted of thirteen concrete blockhouses. These protected the occupiers against air strikes and chemical weapons. German soldiers with small arms and machine guns controlled physical access to the bunkers. During Allied planning for Operation Overlord, the actual date of D-Day needed to be kept secret, but the Allies depended on cooperation with the French Resistance. On 1 June 1944, a message was broadcast over Radio London to inform the Resistance that the invasion could be expected within 2 weeks. The first message consisted of the first three lines of Paul Verlaine's poem Chanson d'automne: Les sanglots longs des violons d'automne ("The long sobs of autumn violins").

On 5 June, at 9:15 pm (London time), Radio London broadcast a second message: the next three lines from the same poem. Blessent mon coeur d'une longeur monotone, or "Wound my heart with a monotonous languor", meant that the invasion was to begin within 48 hours. The Resistance was supposed to increase its efforts against German supply lines, especially railroads, in anticipation of D-Day.

At Tourcoing on 5 June, the 15th Army Headquarters intercepted the message. It was 23:45 (French local time).

== The museum today ==
The largest of the thirteen blockhouses, a Type SK1 Bunker number 381, was converted to a museum. It is dedicated to the installations of the Nazi occupation of France and how those installations worked. The rooms most important to the bunker's wartime function — the generators, ventilators, telephone exchange and translation department, as well as the general's office, kitchen and guard post, are open for public view and are restored to wartime appearance. Other exhibits include methods used by the Gestapo to detect and locate radio transmitters used by the Resistance and a room dedicated to the landings in Normandy. For 2013–2014, the museum has an exhibition dedicated to the commandos who were the first French soldiers to land as part of the liberating force. The museum's stated objective is "to fight for remembrance and against all forms of revisionism."

== Photos ==
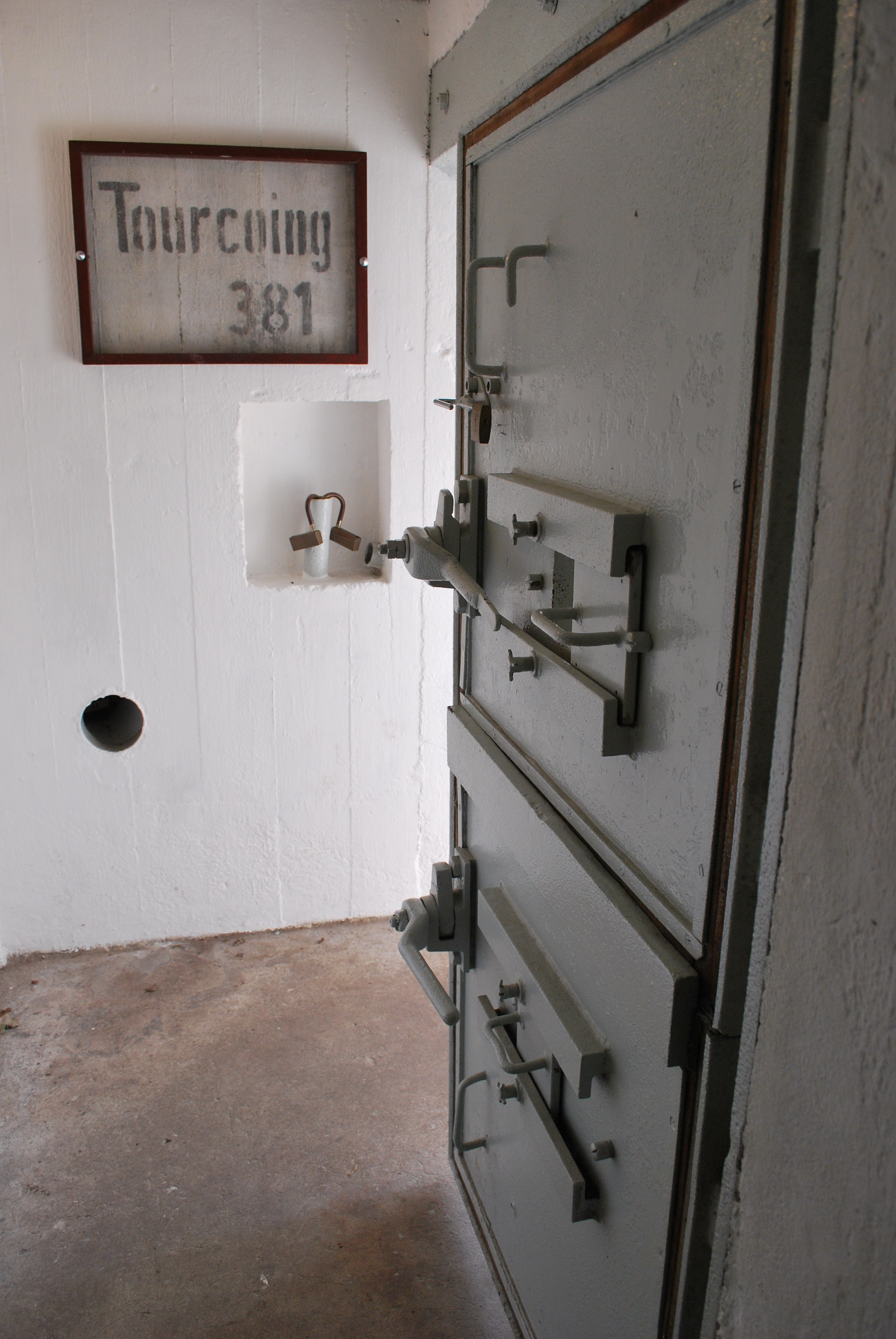
Entrance to the bunker with the original number clearly visible

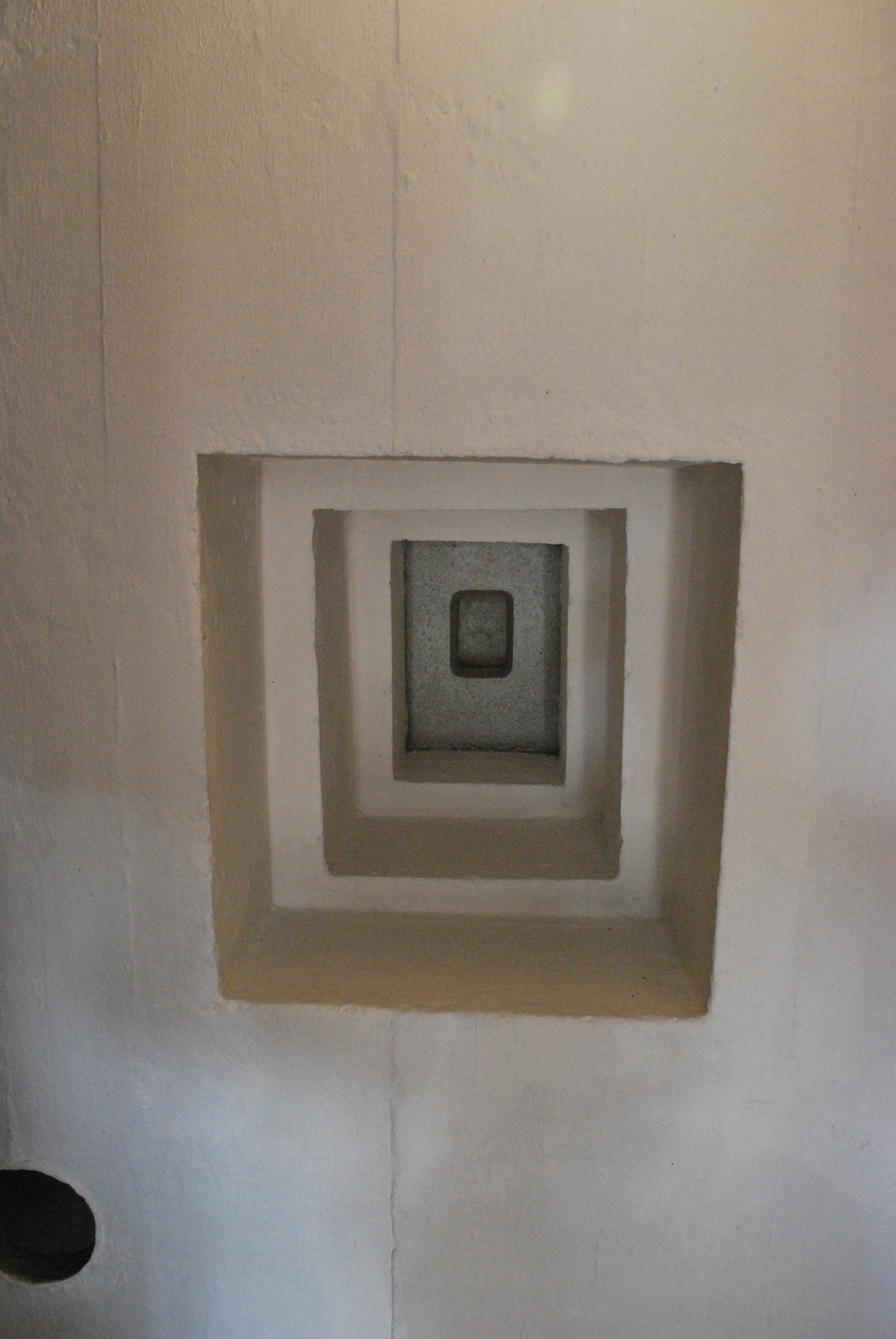
Machine gun nest guarding the entrance

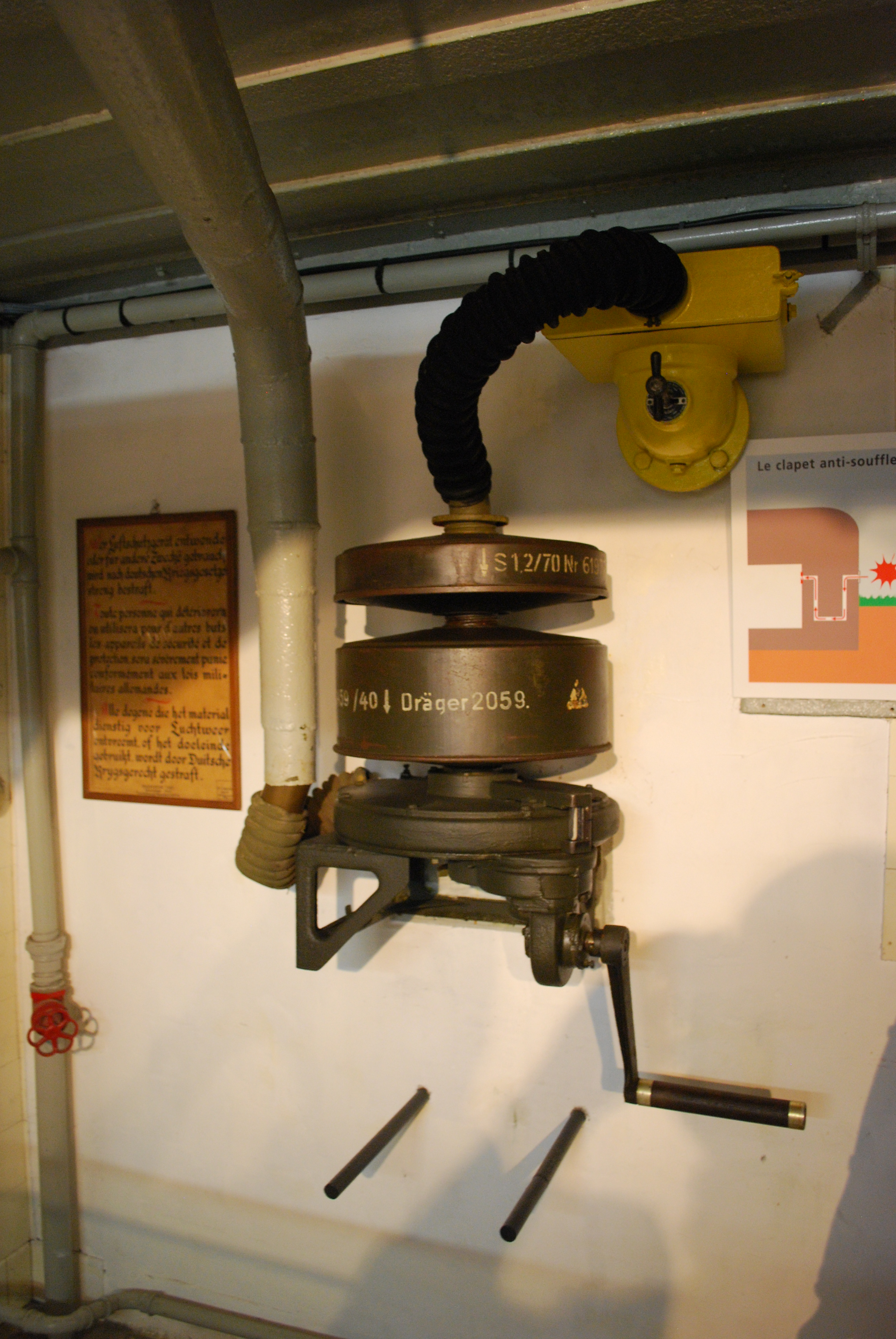
A hand-powered air filter. The poster reads: "Anyone who damages security devices or protective equipment will be severely punished according to German military law."

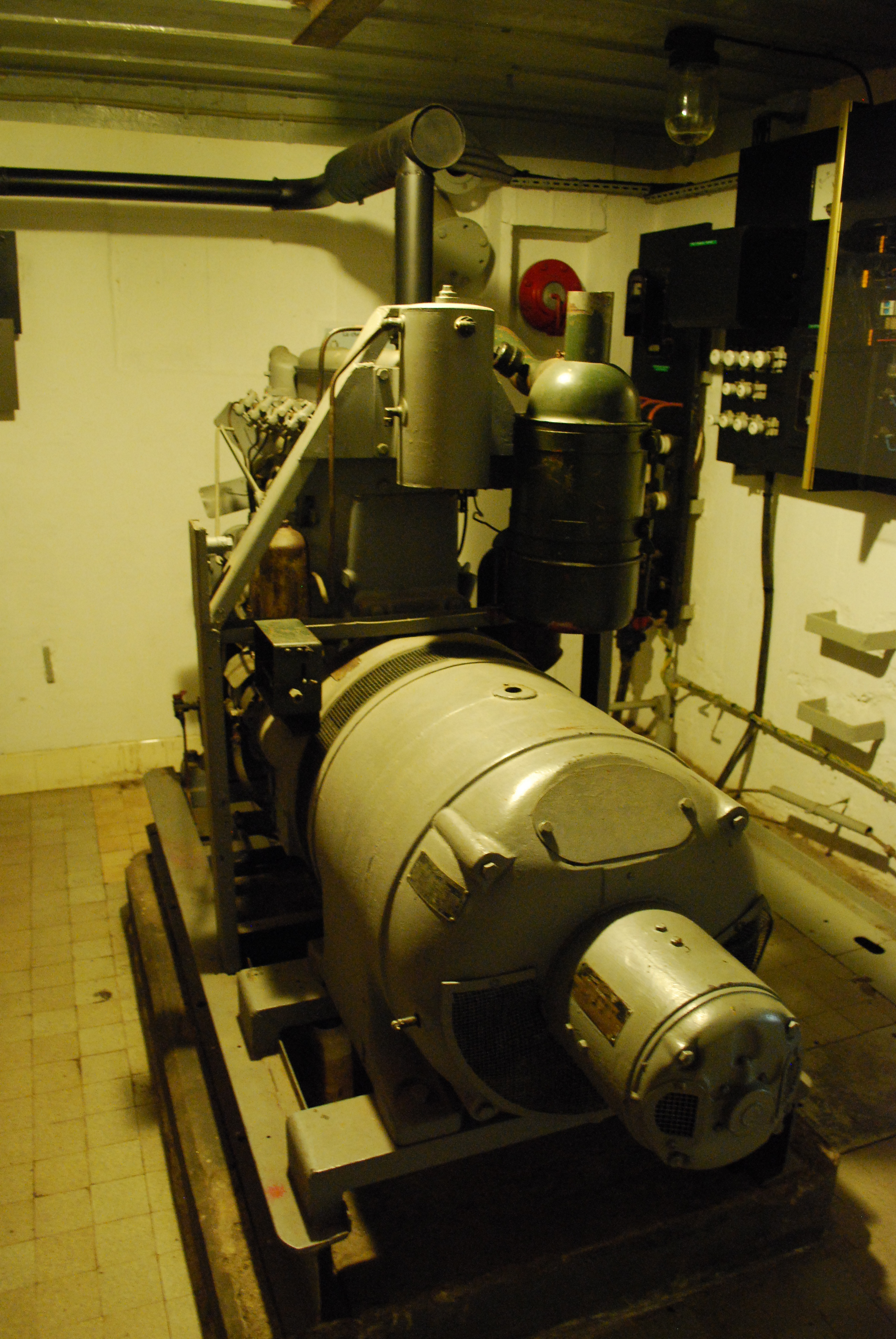
Generator set and electrical circuit boards

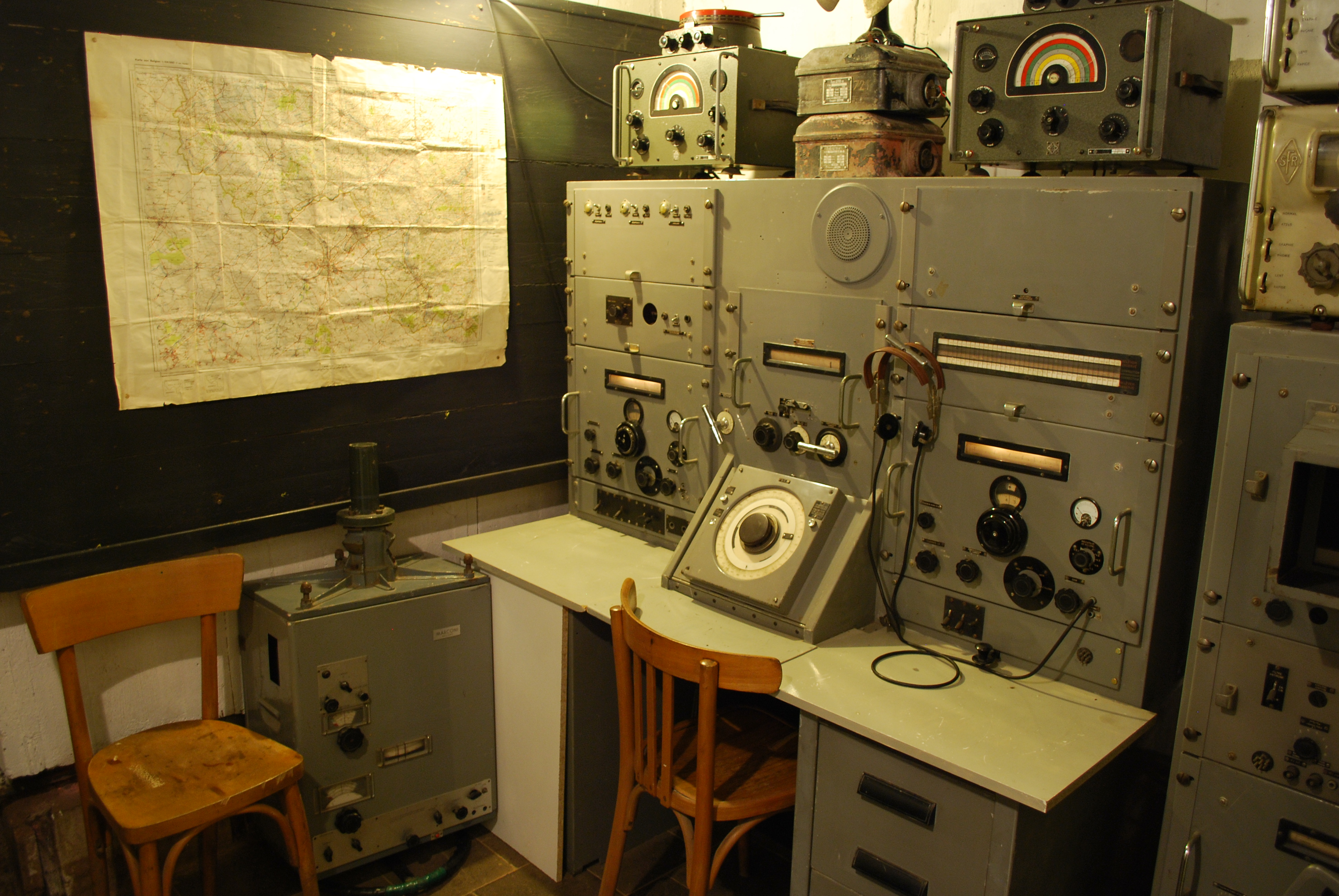
Radio location equipment

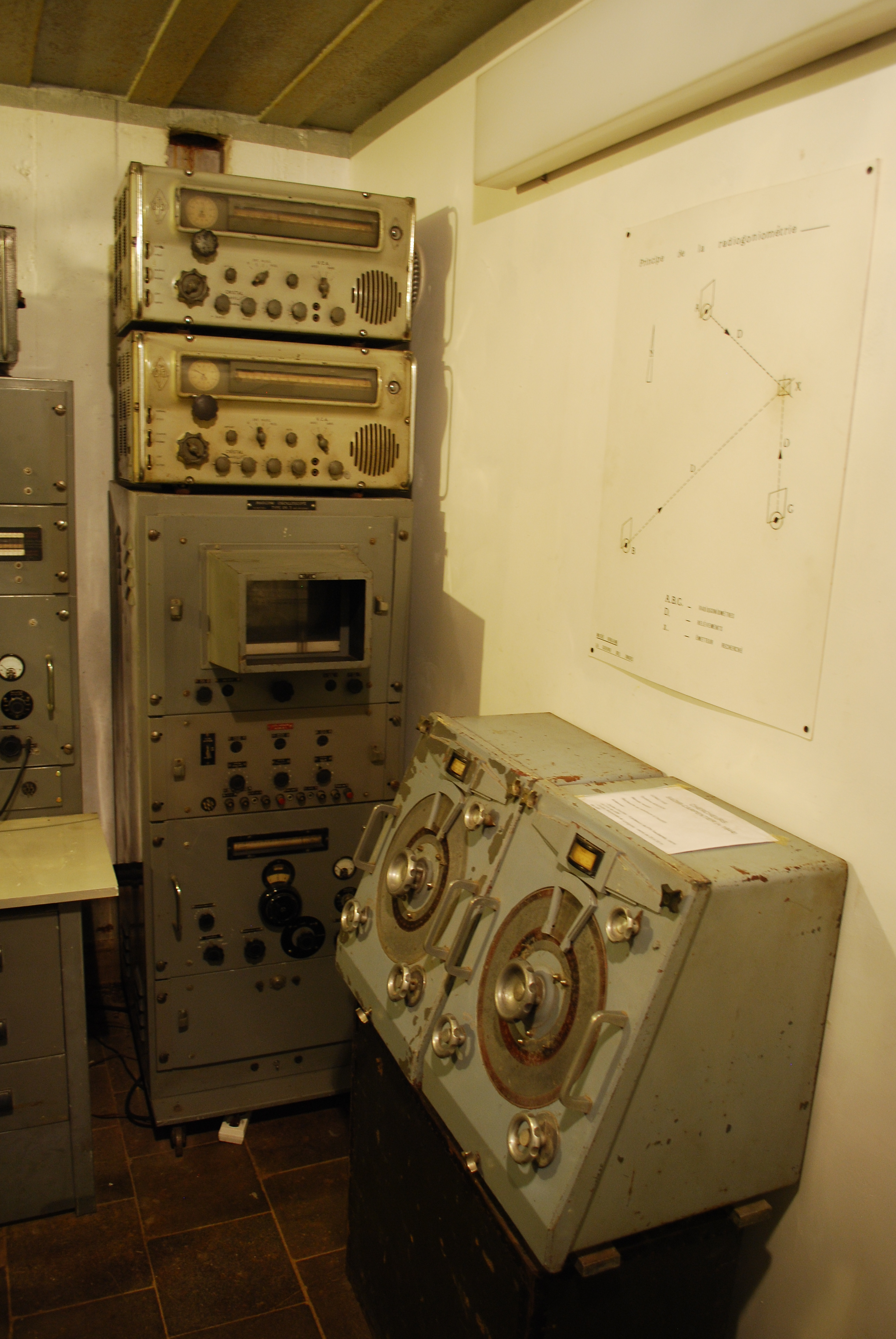
Radio location equipment

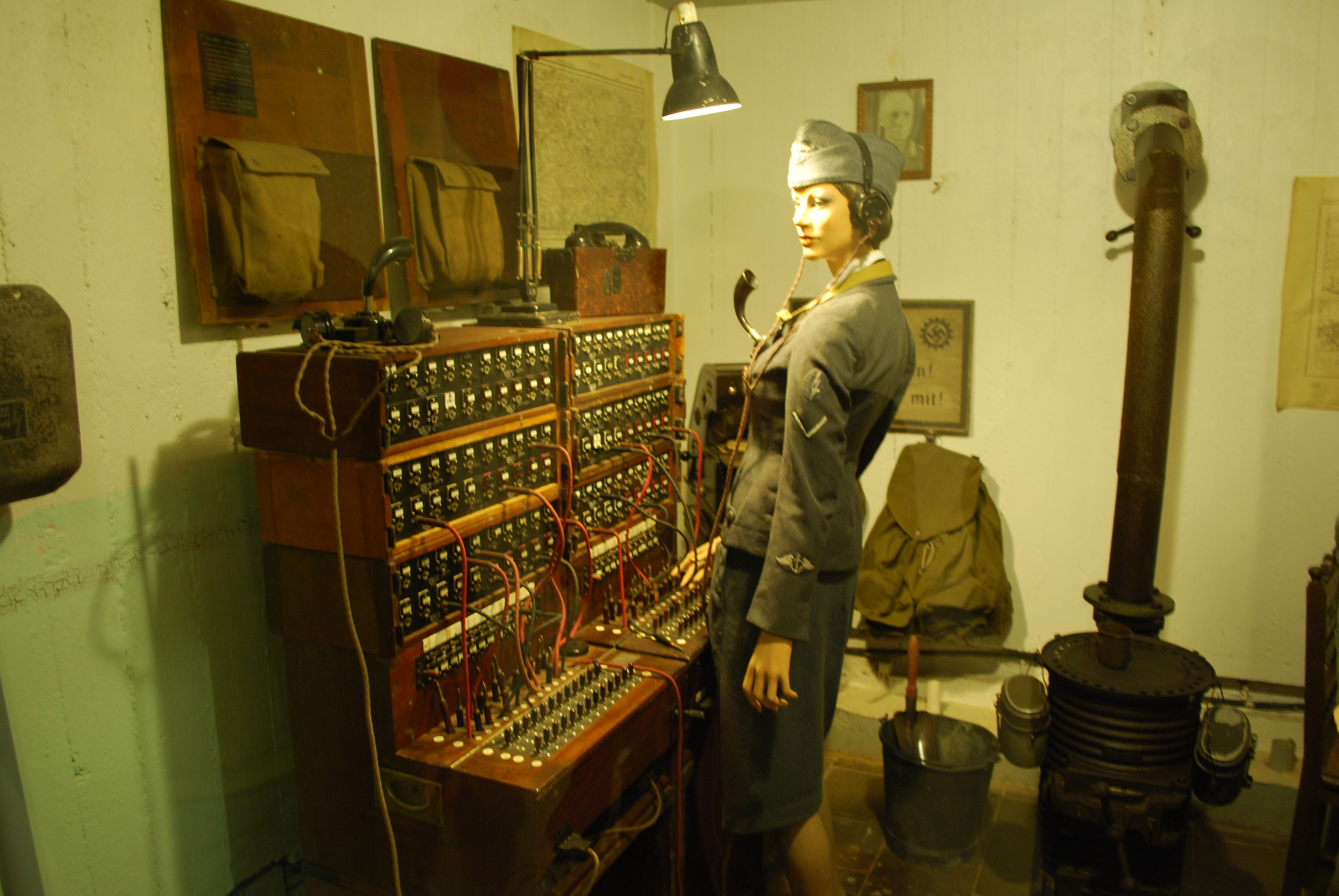
Telephone switchboard

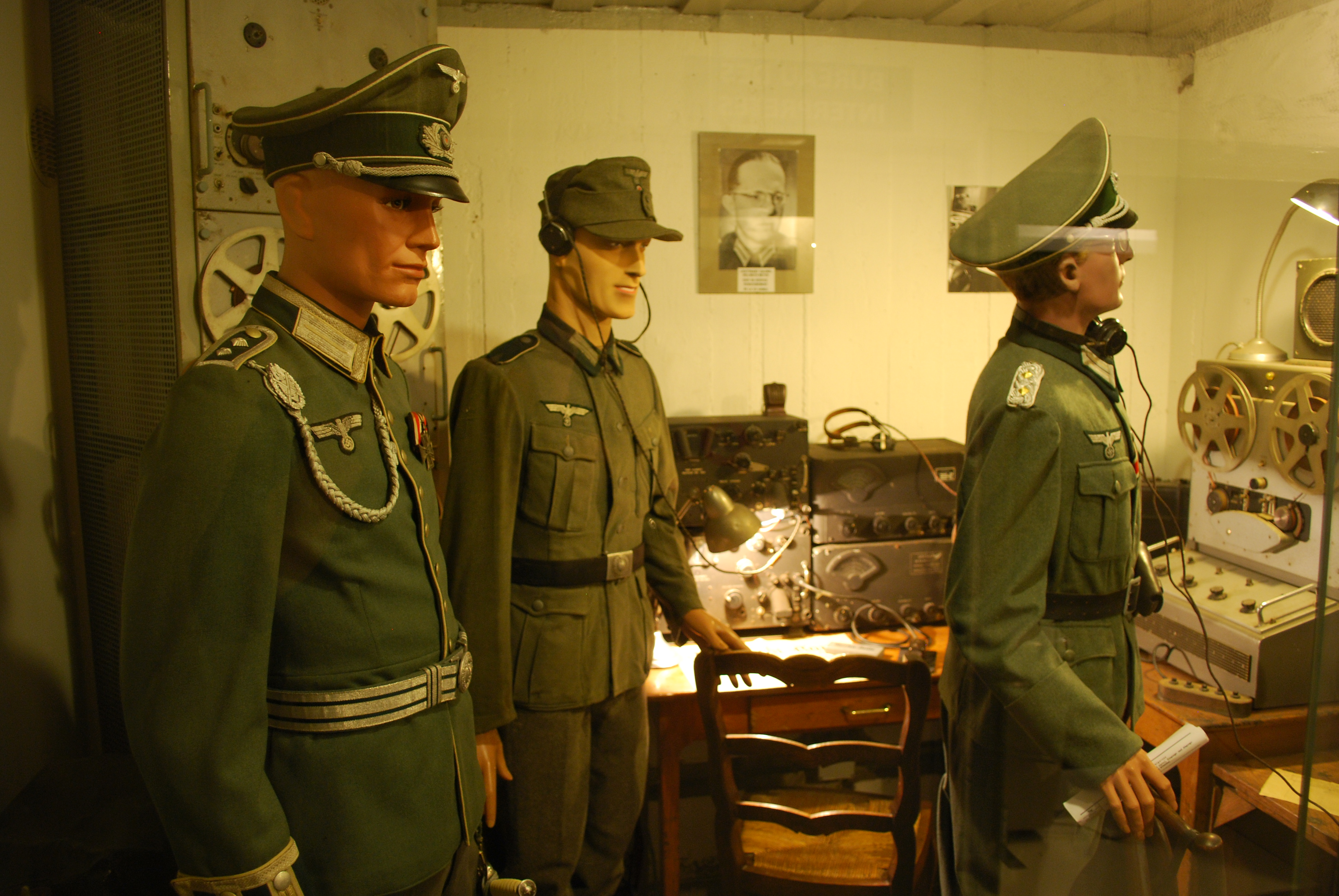
Reconstruction of the interception of the Verlaine Message

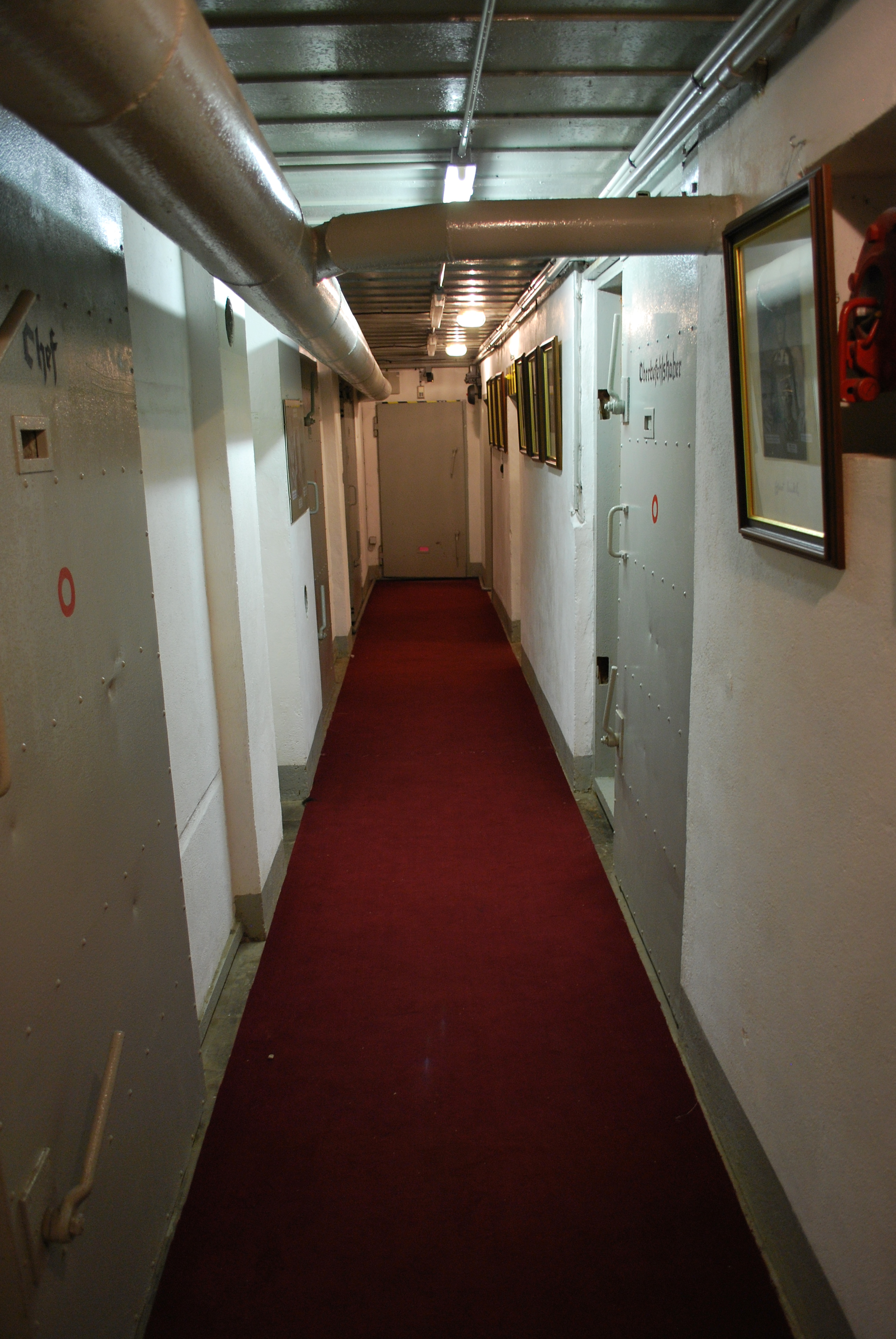
One of the bunker corridors showing gas-tight doors marked with red circles

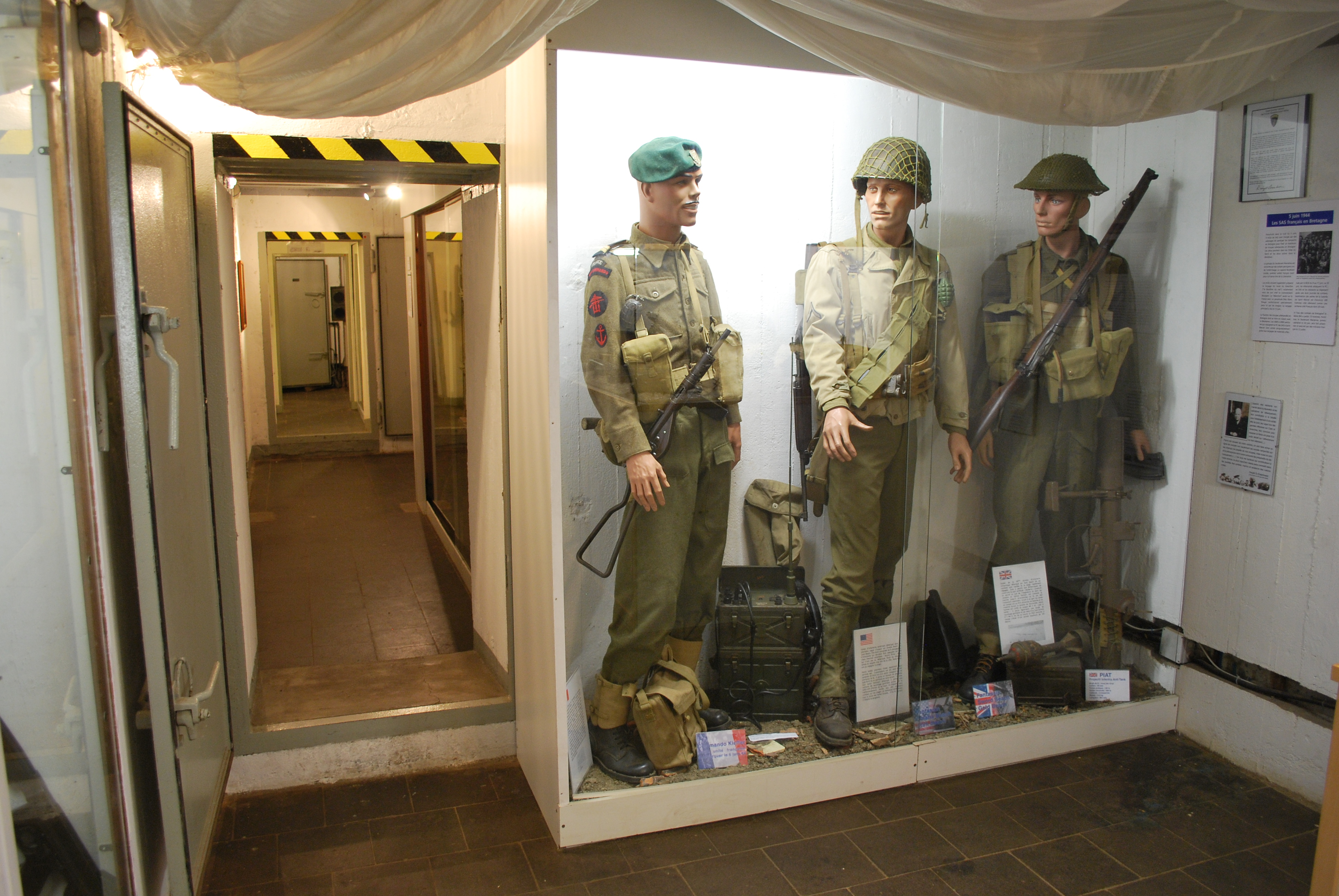
Exhibit in the bunker corridors

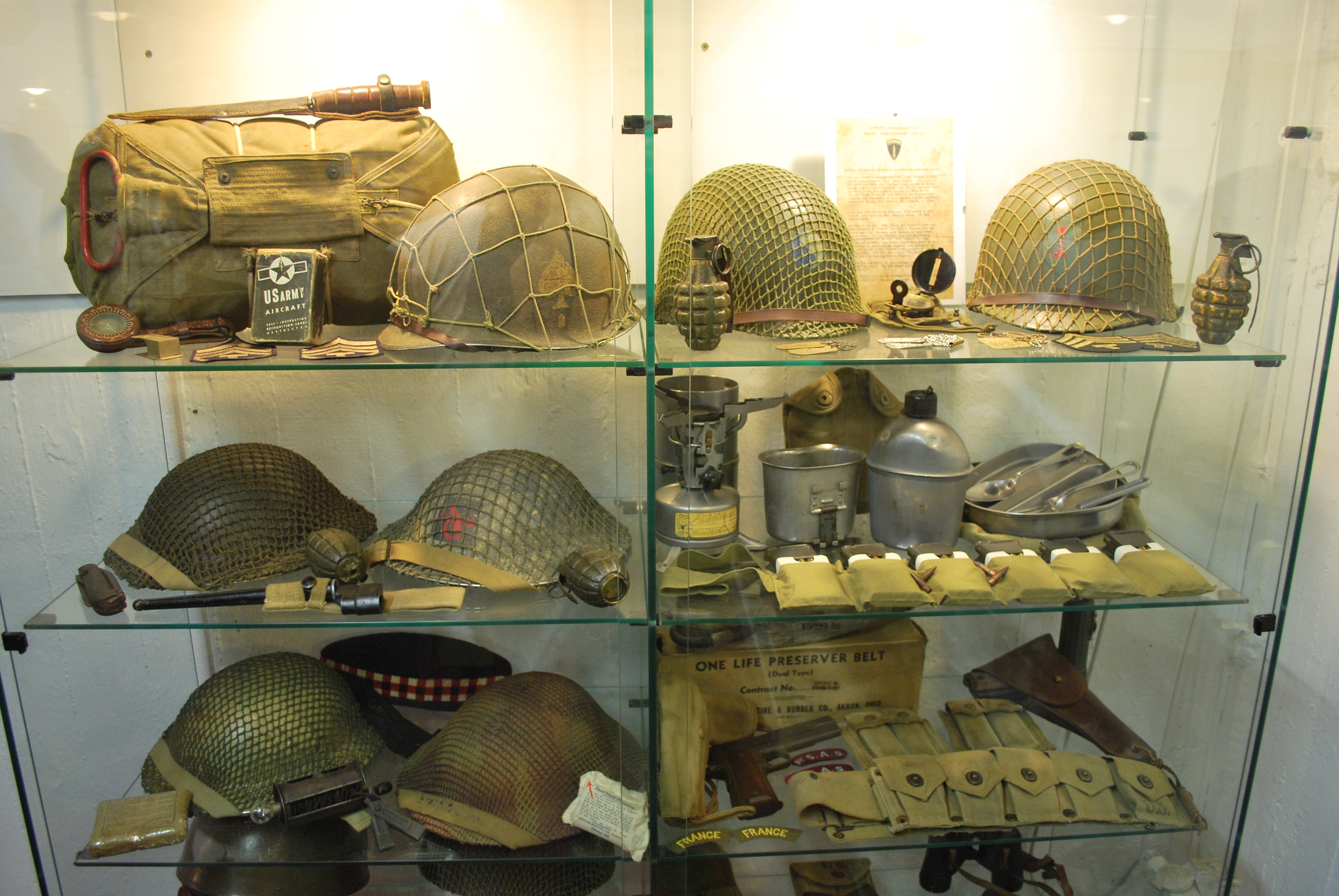
Display of Allied artifacts including a deck of aircraft recognition cards and a copy of General Eisenhower's letter to the D-Day landing forces

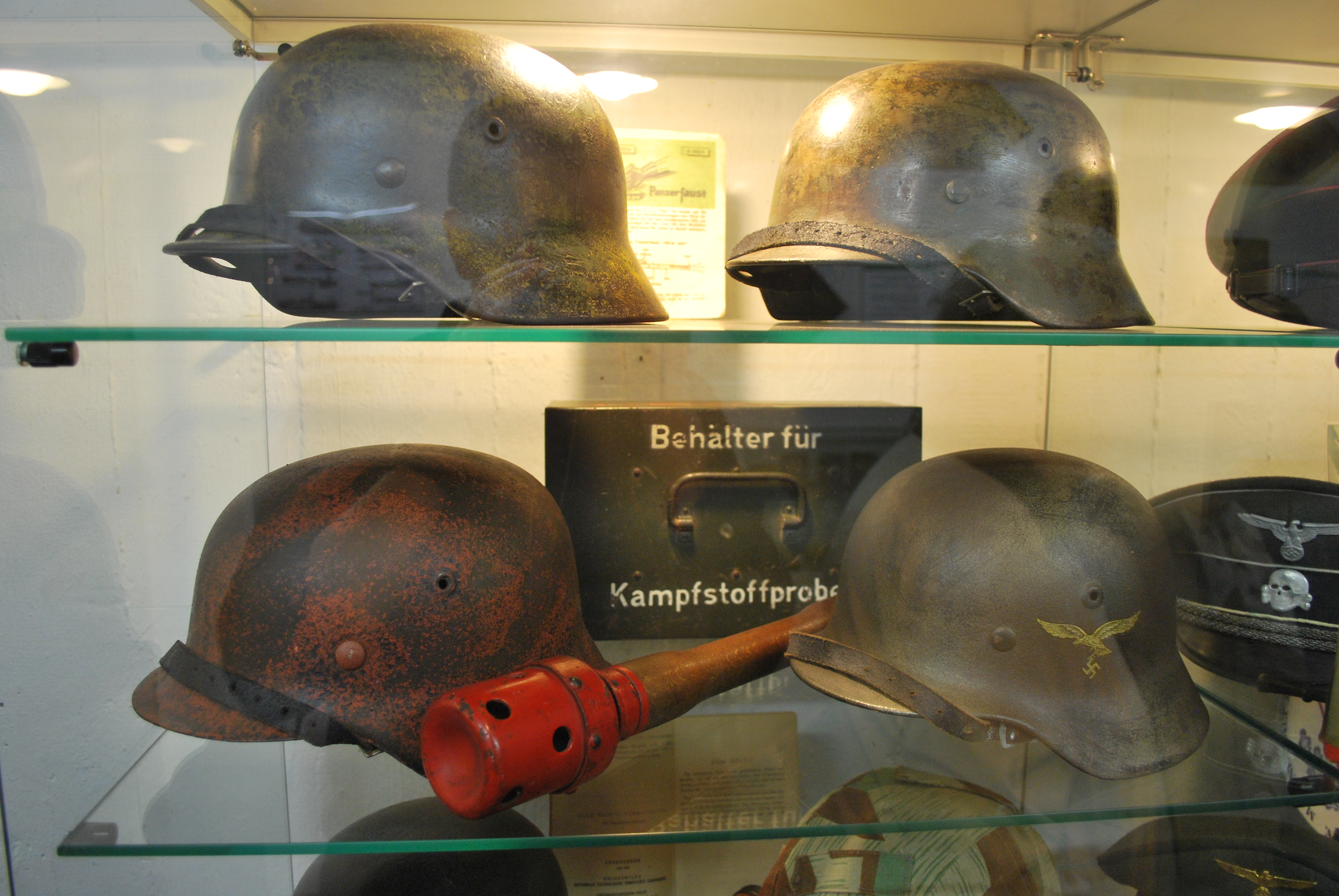
Display of German artifacts including a training version of the stick grenade and a chemical weapons test kit
