= Chanson d'automne =

Poem by Paul Verlaine

Recording in French by Nadine Eckert-Boulet for LibriVox.

Sung in French by Ezwa for LibriVox.

"Chanson d'automne" (French pronunciation: [ʃɑ̃sɔ̃ dotɔn]; "Autumn Song") is a poem by Paul Verlaine (1844–1896), one of the best known in the French language. It is included in Verlaine's first collection, Poèmes saturniens, published in 1866 (see 1866 in poetry). The poem forms part of the "Paysages tristes" ("Sad landscapes") section of the collection.

In World War II lines from the poem were used to send messages from Special Operations Executive (SOE) to the French Resistance about the timing of the forthcoming Invasion of Normandy.

== Content ==
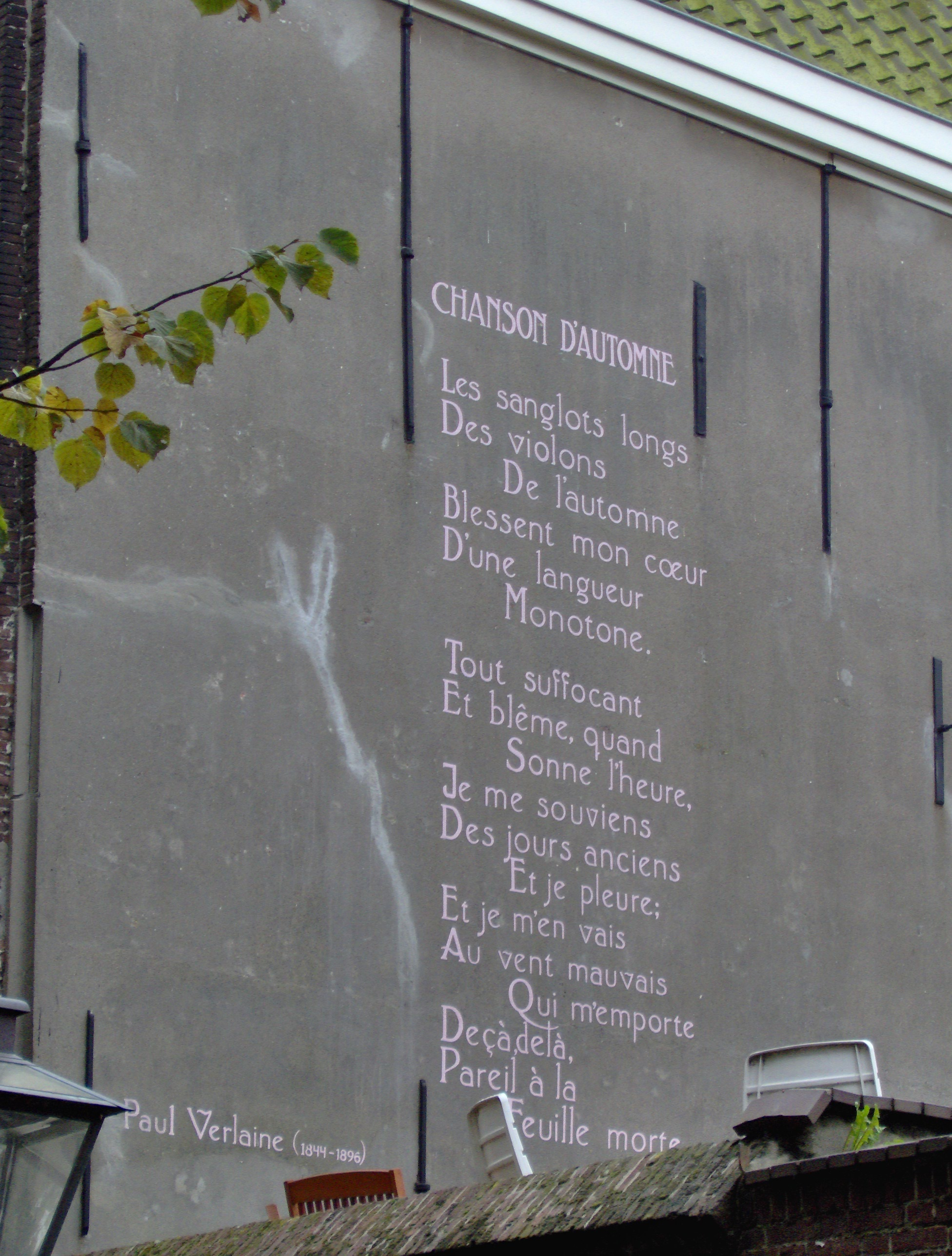
Chanson d'automne

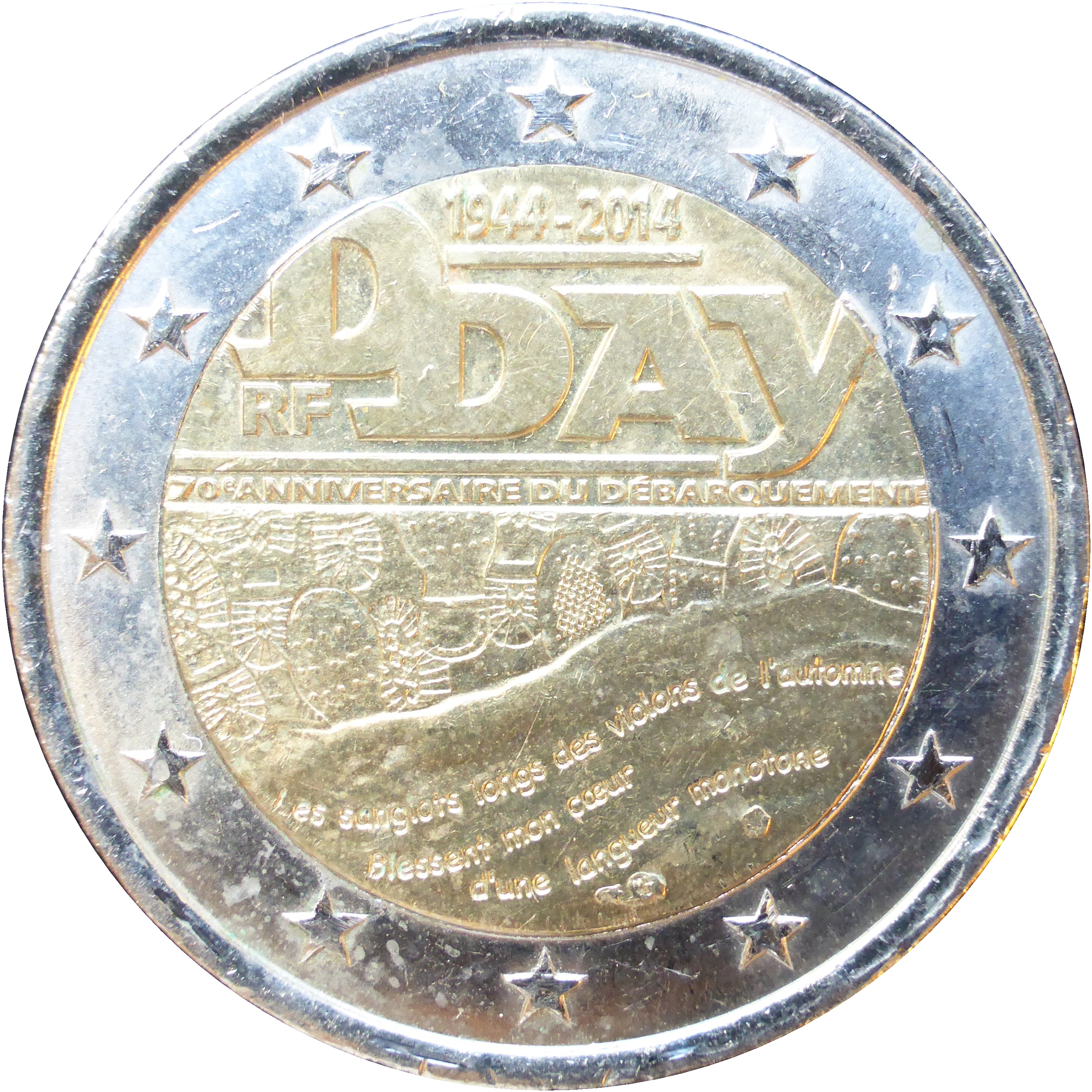
The first lines of the poem shown on a French commemorative coin.

French	English translation
Les sanglots longs Des violons De l'automne Blessent mon cœur D'une langueur Monotone. Tout suffocant Et blême, quand Sonne l'heure, Je me souviens Des jours anciens Et je pleure; Et je m'en vais Au vent mauvais Qui m'emporte Deçà, delà, Pareil à la Feuille morte.	The long sobs Of violins In autumn Wound my heart With a monotonous Languor. All breathless And pale, when The hour sounds, I remember The old days And I cry; And I am leaving In an ill wind That carries me Here, there, Like a Leaf that died.

== Critical analysis ==
The poem uses several stylistic devices and is in many ways typical of Verlaine, in that it employs sound techniques such as consonance (the repetition of "n" and "r" sounds) that also creates an onomatopoeic effect, sounding both monotonous and like a violin. In the second verse, the stop consonant and pause after the word suffocant reflect the meaning of the word. At the age of 22, Verlaine uses the symbolism of autumn in the poem to describe a sad view of growing old.

== Use in World War II ==
In preparation for Operation Overlord, the BBC's Radio Londres signalled to the French Resistance with the opening lines of the 1866 Verlaine poem "Chanson d'Automne" to indicate the start of D-Day operations under the command of the Special Operations Executive. The first three lines of the poem, "Les sanglots longs / des violons / de l'automne" ("The long sobs of autumn's violins"), would mean that Operation Overlord was to start within two weeks. These lines were broadcast on 1 June 1944. The next set of lines, "Blessent mon coeur / d'une langueur / monotone" ("wound my heart with a monotonous languor"), meant that Operation Overlord would start within 48 hours, and that the resistance should begin sabotage operations, especially on the French railroad system; these lines were broadcast on 5 June at 23:15.

== Adaptation in songs ==
In 1940, Charles Trenet made changes to the words of the poem in order to change it into a song. There has been speculation that it was the popularity of his version that led to the use of the poem by SOE.

A later French singer, Serge Gainsbourg, uses parts of the poem in the lyrics of his song "Je suis venu te dire que je m'en vais" ("I've come here to tell you that I am leaving").

== See also ==
- The Longest Day (film)
- Verlaine Message Museum
