= Radio Londres =

French anti-Nazi radio station

- London; England
- Broadcast area: France
- Frequencies: Constantly changing, broadcasting on mediumwave, longwave and shortwave

Programming
- Language: French
- Format: Propaganda
- Affiliations: French government in London, Special Operations Executive

Ownership
- Owner: BBC European Service
- Sister stations: Radio Belgique; Londoner Rundfunk

History
- First air date: 19 June 1940
- Last air date: 25 October 1944

Radio Londres ([ʁa.djo lɔ̃dʁ], French for "Radio London") was a radio station broadcast from 1940 to 1944 by the BBC in London to Nazi-occupied France. It was entirely in French and was operated by the Free French who had escaped from occupied France. It served not only to counter the propaganda broadcasts of German-controlled Radio Paris and the Vichy government's Radiodiffusion Nationale, but also to appeal to the French to rise up, as well as being used to send coded messages to the French Resistance.

== Origin and purpose ==
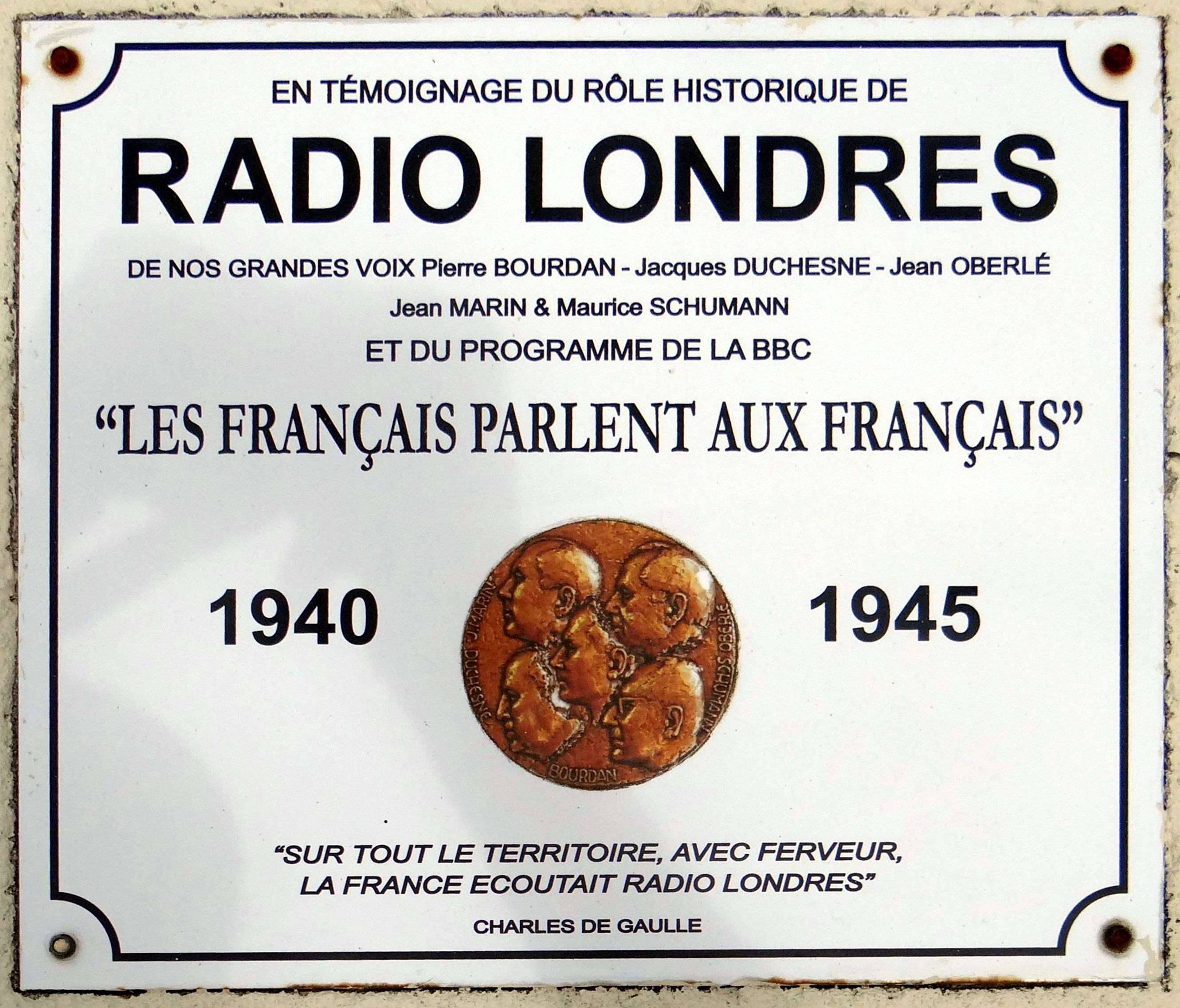
Commemorative plaque of Radio Londres in the cemetery of Asnelles, Calvados

In 1940, the BBC opened its studio to the first members of the resistance who fled France's occupation by Germany. Radio Londres was born and would become the daily appointment of the French people for four years. It opened its transmission with : "Ici Londres ! Les Français parlent aux Français..." ("This is London! The French speak to the French..."), now a very famous quote in France. It was the voice of Free French Forces under Charles de Gaulle, who, on 18 June 1940, made his famous Appeal of 18 June, inviting his compatriots to resist and rise against the occupation.

By means of broadcasts from Britain, the French Resistance found a voice that could be heard on the continent, serving to counter the Nazi propaganda broadcasts of Radio Paris and Radio-Vichy. Realising the negative effect that it had on their occupation, the Germans quickly prohibited listening to Radio Londres. Radio Londres also encouraged rising up against the occupation, including De Gaulle's calls to empty the streets of Paris for one hour, demonstrations, and the preparation of D-Day, or the V for Victory campaign, involving drawing a V sign on walls as an act of subversion. It also sent coded messages to the French resistance (see below).

Breaking with the formal style of the French radio stations, some young announcers (Jacques Duchesne, Jean Oberlé, Pierre Bourdan, Maurice Schumann and Pierre Dac) changed the tone with personal messages, sketches, songs, jokes and comic advertising.

== Coded messages ==
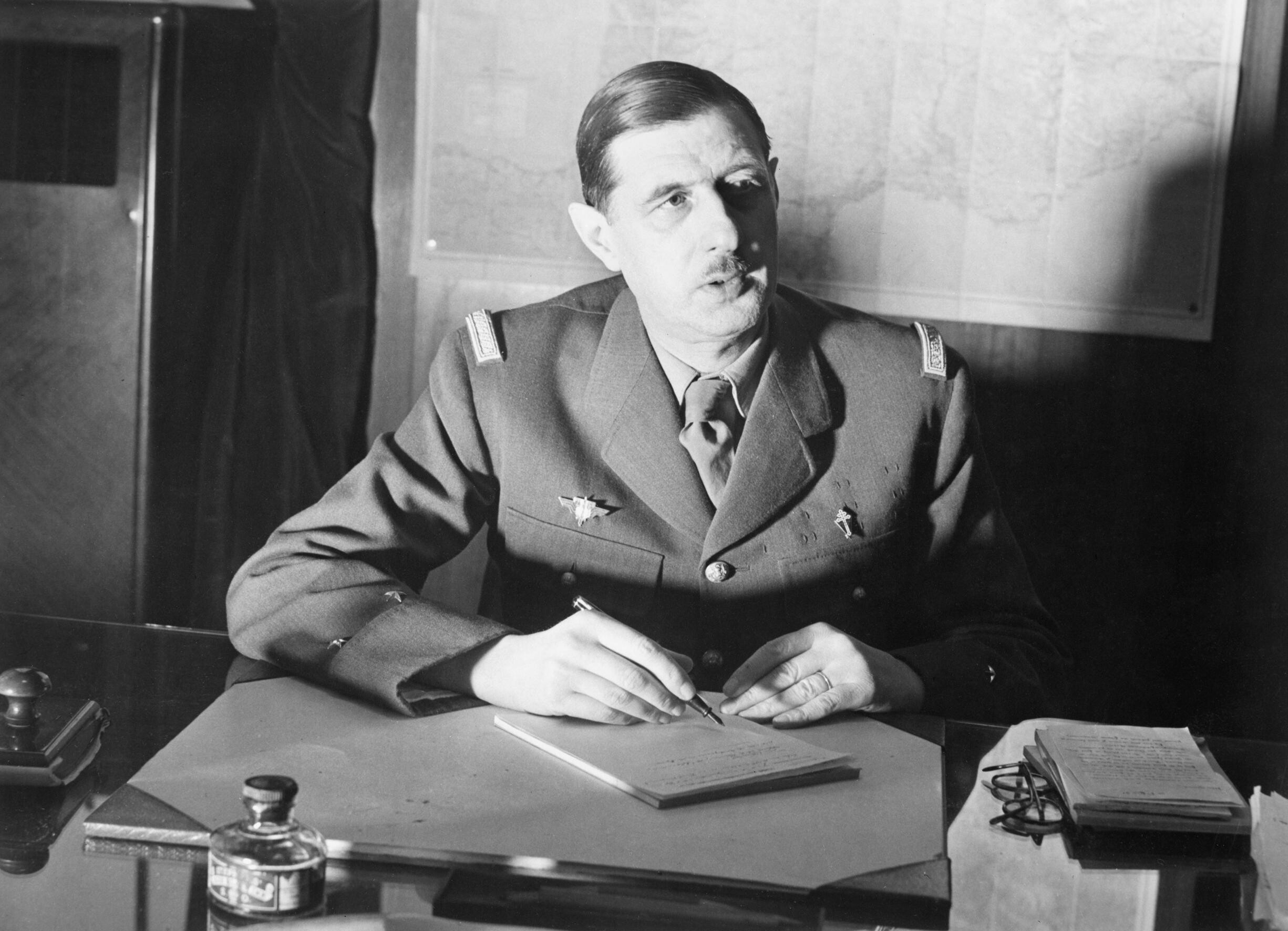
Charles de Gaulle (pictured) made several broadcasts on Radio Londres during the war

Georges Bégué, an operative with the Special Operations Executive (SOE) had the idea of sending seemingly obscure personal messages to agents in the field, in order to reduce risky radio traffic.

Broadcasts would begin with "Before we begin, please listen to some personal messages." It was clear to nearly everyone that they were coded messages, often amusing, and completely without context. Representative messages include "Jean has a long moustache" and "There is a fire at the insurance agency", each one having some meaning to a certain resistance group. They were used primarily to provide messages to the resistance, but also to thank their agents or simply to give the enemy the impression that something was being prepared. Because these messages were in code, not cipher, the occupiers could not hope to understand them without a codebook, so they had to focus their efforts on jamming the messages instead.

From the beginning of June 1944, the Allies inundated the network with messages. On 1 June alone, over 200 messages were sent, making it clear to those listening that something was in the works. Although in some places the Axis jamming was more effective than others, the background noise and static were not enough to drown out the sound of Beethoven's 5th Symphony, the first four notes of which correspond to the ▄ ▄ ▄ ▄▄▄ of the Morse code letter V for Victory.

Shortly before the D-Day landings of 6 June 1944, Radio Londres broadcast the first stanza of Paul Verlaine's poem "Chanson d'automne" to let the resistance know that the invasion was imminent. The first part of the stanza, Les sanglots longs des violons de l’automne ("the long sobs of the violins of autumn") indicated that the invasion would begin within 24 hours; the second, Blessent mon cœur d'une langueur monotone ("wound my heart with a monotonous languor") was the specific call to action.

By late 1944, Allied victory in France meant the end of Radio Londres.

== See also ==
- German occupation of France during World War II
- French Resistance
- Liberation of France
- Radio Belgique
- Radio Londra
- Verlaine Message Museum
