= Leonard Lomell =

U.S. Army soldier and attorney (1920–2011)

Leonard G. Lomell
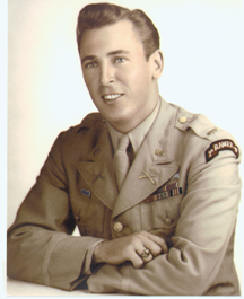
- Lomell as a Second Lieutenant
- Born: January 22, 1920; Brooklyn, New York, US
- Died: March 1, 2011 (aged 91); Toms River, New Jersey, US
- Spouse: Charlotte Lomell
- Military career
- Allegiance: United States
- Branch: United States Army
- Service years: 1942–1945
- Rank: Second Lieutenant
- Nickname: Bud
- Service number: 32269677
- Units: D Company, 2nd Ranger Battalion
- Conflicts: World War II; Battle of Normandy; Battle of Hurtgen Forest; Battle of the Bulge
- Awards: Légion d'honneur Distinguished Service Cross; Military Medal; Silver Star; Bronze Star; Purple Heart
- Other work: Attorney

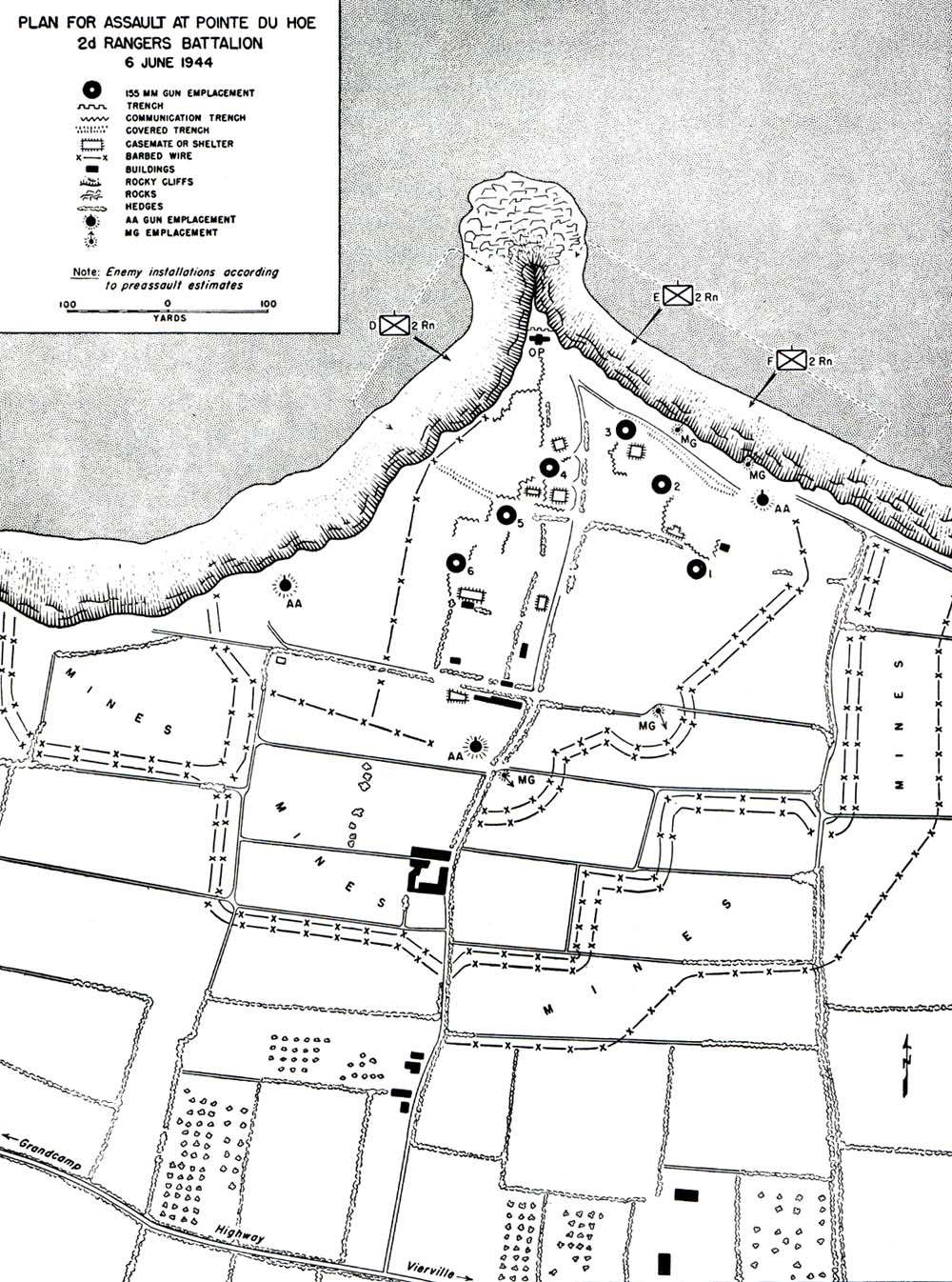
Plan for Assault on Pointe du Hoc, June 6, 1944

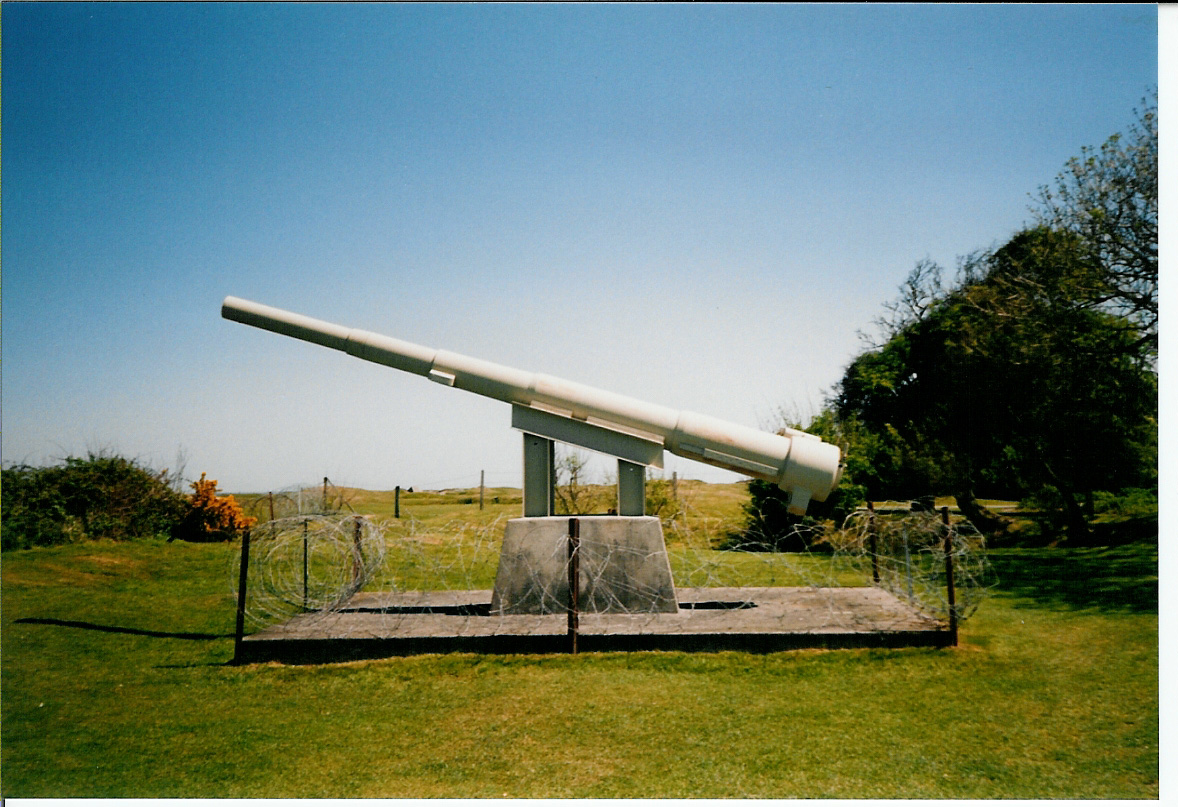
Replica at Pointe du Hoc of a disabled gun's barrel

Leonard G. "Bud" Lomell (January 22, 1920 – March 1, 2011) was a highly decorated former United States Army Ranger who served in World War II. He is best known for his actions in the first hours of D-Day at Pointe du Hoc on the coast of Normandy, France.

Pointe du Hoc was the site of the German Army's largest coastal weapons, five 155-millimeter German guns with a 25-kilometre (16 mi) range that endangered the tens of thousands of troops landing on Omaha Beach and Utah Beach, and thousands of watercraft in the English Channel supporting the Normandy invasion. Unbeknownst to the Allied intelligence, the Germans had concealed the guns in an orchard, but left them operational and ready to fire. Through skill, courage and "pure luck," Lomell found and quickly disabled all five guns. Lomell was recognized by historian Stephen Ambrose as the single individual—other than Gen. Dwight D. Eisenhower—most responsible for the success of D-Day. Six months later, in the Battle of Hürtgen Forest, he would again distinguish himself, earning a Silver Star for his heroism and leadership as the 2nd Ranger Battalion captured and held Hill 400. After the war he returned to Ocean County, New Jersey, becoming an attorney in Toms River.

== Life before Normandy ==
According to journalist Tom Brokaw, who devoted a chapter to Lomell in the "Heroes" section of his bestseller The Greatest Generation, Lomell "was the adopted son of Scandinavian immigrant parents who took him into their family as an infant in Brooklyn." A few years later his parents, George G. Lomell and Pauline Peterson Lomell, moved to Point Pleasant Beach, New Jersey, where he graduated from Point Pleasant Beach High School.

Lomell attended Tennessee Wesleyan College, on an athletic scholarship and work program, where he was editor of the school newspaper and president of his fraternity. He graduated in 1941, then returned to New Jersey to work as a brakeman on a freight train before enlisting in the Army. While working in New Jersey he met his future wife, Charlotte Ewart, then training as a nurse. Lomell entered the Army in 1942 and initially served with the 76th Infantry Division, before volunteering for the Rangers.

== D-Day morning ==
The initial mission of companies D, E and F of the 2nd Ranger Battalion was one of the most difficult of the entire invasion – scaling sheer cliffs at Pointe du Hoc, seizing control of its massively reinforced fortifications, and disabling five 155-millimeter cannons that allied intelligence reported had been emplaced there. Their landing was scheduled to coincide with the first landings on Omaha Beach.

At 24, First Sergeant Lomell was the acting commander for the Battalion's D Company. Due to heavy seas and the fog of battle, Lomell's landing craft arrived thirty-five minutes late, away from its mark, and lost any element of surprise. Those who made it down the ramp or over the side had to swim inland about 20 feet (6.1 m). As Lomell was bringing in a box of rope and a hand-projector rocket, he was wounded in the side by a machine-gun bullet, but reached shore without pausing. First Sergeant Lomell reached the top of the cliff through the use of two ladders, and along with eleven other men from his landing craft, moved off of the edge of the cliff.

D Company's specific objectives were to take the three western gun emplacements, and to then assemble to the south edge of the fortified area to control the coastal road (so as to prevent German reinforcements from reaching the Omaha Beach area from the west). Aerial and naval bombardment of the Pointe du Hoc area, designed to destroy the guns, and their defenses and defenders, had turned the landscape into a moonscape of craters.

However, as the Army's official account of the battle later stated, "one party after another reached its allotted emplacement, to make the same discovery … there was no sign of the guns or of artillery equipment. Evidently, the 155's had been removed from the Point before the period of major bombardments."

The Hollywood account of the conquest of Pointe du Hoc, as presented in Darryl F. Zanuck's movie "The Longest Day," ends there, overlooking the successes that were soon to come.

After 1st Sgt Lomell's company took up positions along both edges of the coastal highway to prepare for the expected German reinforcements, Lomell and Staff Sergeant Jack E. Kuhn formed a patrol to head south down a double-hedgerowed lane. Lomell saw markings in this sunken road that looked like something heavy had been over it.

Lomell and Kuhn found five of the missing 155s, concealed under camouflage in an orchard. In Lomell's words, "it was pure luck." The guns had been placed in a position to fire toward Utah Beach and were capable of being switched for use against Omaha Beach. With S/Sgt Kuhn covering him against possible defenders, First Sergeant Lomell went into the battery and set off silent thermite grenades in the mechanisms of two guns. Because the thermite grenades melted their gears in a moment, they effectively disabled them. After bashing in a third gun's gunsights, Lomell went back for more grenades.

The official U.S. Army account of the episode reported that members of E Company "finished off the job" while Lomell was retrieving more thermite grenades from other members of his own company. Although E Company indisputably destroyed the ammunition cache set aside for the 155's, more recent accounts of the episode give Lomell, and not E Company, the credit for disabling the rest of the guns. When the Pointe was taken, guns were disabled and coastal road was taken, the Second Battalion became the first American unit to accomplish its D-Day mission, and did so before 9:00 a.m.

The Battalion would successfully defend its victories for the next few days before it was finally relieved. Of the 225 Rangers who disembarked with 1st Sgt Lomell, only 90 were left standing at the end of the battle.

== Hürtgen Forest: the capture of Hill 400 ==
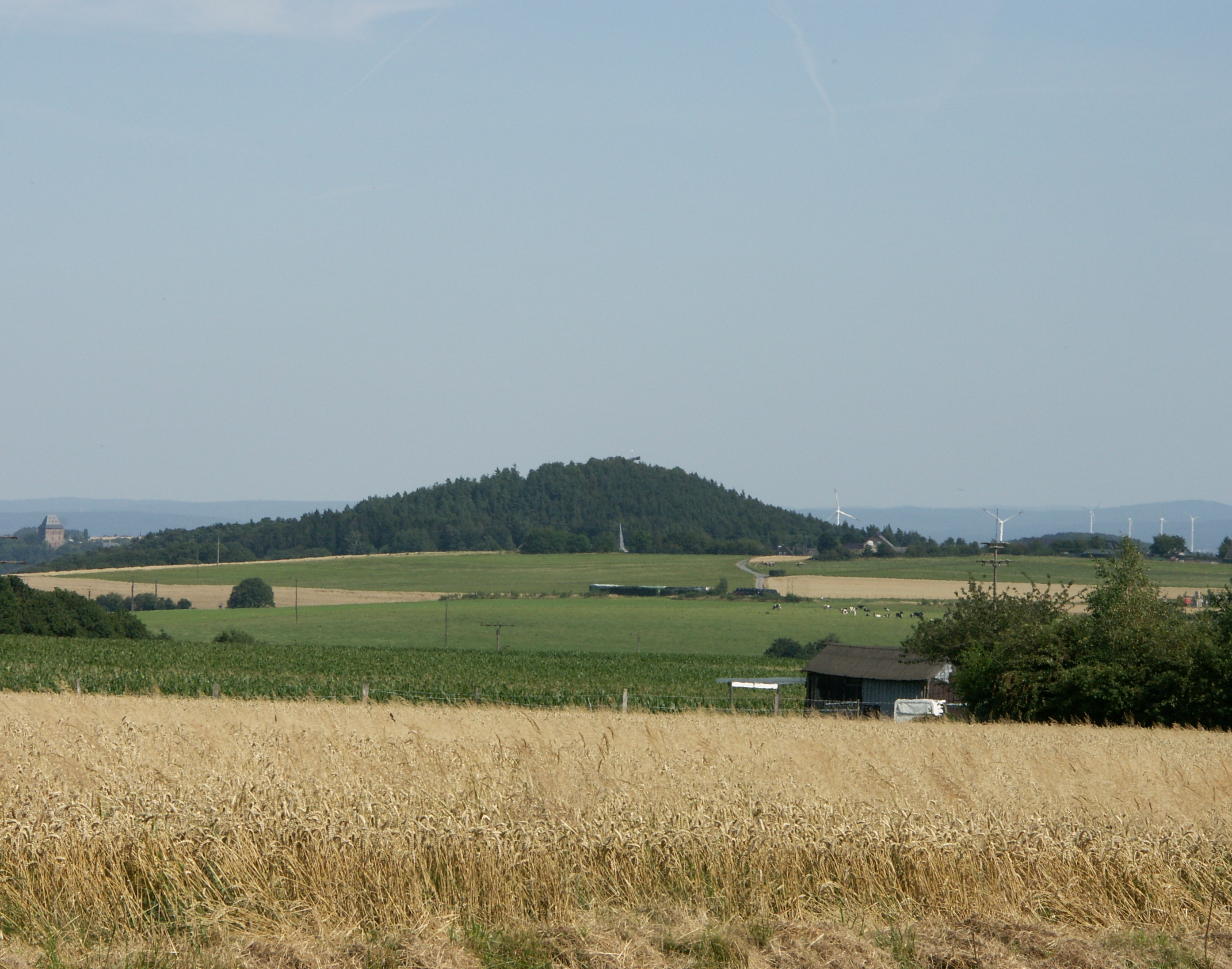
Hill 400 today

In the Battle of Hürtgen Forest (near the Roer River in Northwestern Germany), Lomell's actions in the capture of "Castle Hill," otherwise known as Hill 400, earned him a Silver Star.

On December 7, 1944, companies of the Second Ranger Battalion were ordered to attack Hill 400, a commanding battlefield position that four divisions of the First Army had tried and failed to take. The Rangers caught the Germans by surprise, but early in the battle the commanding officers of each company were wounded or captured, and the Rangers were soon outnumbered ten to one. Lomell — now a second lieutenant following a battlefield commission — then took charge, representing the entire command structure on the crest of the hill. Lomell personally attacked a German weapons shelter on the newly conquered hilltop, driving the surviving enemy to surrender. As military historian Charles B. MacDonald would later write, "so swiftly did the Rangers move that the Germans were thoroughly cowed," so that "by 0835 the two companies had taken twenty-eight prisoners and held the crest.". Before the day was over the Germans would counterattack five times. Lomell was awarded the Silver Star at a ceremony in Toms River NJ on November 9, 2007, for his heroism at Hill 400. As Lomell's Silver Star citation would later state, "conspicuously leading from the front, Lomell directed the successful defense of the hilltop in the face of a nearly overwhelming German counterattack at midday. During the German bombardment that preceded the attack, Lomell suffered a head concussion and shrapnel wound in his left arm rendering it useless. Refusing shelter and, at risk of his life with blood oozing from his ears, nose and mouth, firing his machine gun cradled in his bandaged left arm with his right hand, he continued to lead his men against another ruthless German assault throughout the entire afternoon." According to MacDonald, "by 1600 the Rangers had only twenty-five men left,″ but with precision artillery support, Lomell and the other twenty-four held out long enough to be relieved.

Military historians praised not only Lomell's courage on Hill 400, but also his judgment under fire. In a comprehensive history of the U.S. Rangers, Thomas Taylor lauded Lomell's "brilliant defense of the hill top," especially his decision to send out patrols immediately after taking the crest of the hill."Too weak to hold everywhere, Lomell had to learn where the Germans were building to attack. . . . He boldly sent out two-man recon patrols to check out likely enemy assembly areas down hill. These crafty patrols were eminently successful, so Lomell was able to meet each thrust with what little strength he had." As a result, Taylor wrote, "Hill 400 was saved by brains and bravery at the junior level."

Lomell would soon be wounded a third time, in the Battle of the Bulge. He was honorably discharged in December 1945, four months after VJ Day and seven months after VE Day.

== Awards and decorations ==

Combat Infantryman Badge
Distinguished Service Cross (United States)	Silver Star	Bronze Star Medal
Purple Heart with two Oak leaf clusters	Good Conduct Medal	European–African–Middle Eastern Campaign Medal with an Arrowhead device and three Service stars
World War II Victory Medal	Legion of Honour	Military Medal
Presidential Unit Citation
Shoulder sleeve insignia 2nd Ranger Battalion

== After the war ==
Lomell returned to New Jersey in 1945, and married Charlotte on the second anniversary of D-Day. Leonard and Charlotte were eventually the parents of three daughters. He enrolled in law school at La Salle University and Rutgers University, passing the bar in 1951. He was the founder and senior member of the law firm of Lomell, Muccifori, Adler, Ravaschiere & Amabile, subsequently known as the Lomell Law Firm. He retired from the practice of law in the mid-1980s.

In business, Lomell was a director of The First National Bank of Toms River and a director and vice-president of Statewide Bancorp. He was a director of the South Jersey Title Insurance Co., Atlantic City. Among his civic activities, he was a member of the Dover Township Board of Education; president of the Garden State Philharmonic Symphony Society; chairman of the Dover Township Juvenile Conference Committee; a member of the Community Memorial Hospital building committee; and a director of the Ocean County Historical Society. Lomell was a member of Christ Church, Episcopal, and served on its board, and as president of its Men's Club and legal counsel. He served as an Ocean County College Foundation trustee.

During his lifetime, he participated in a number of television and radio interviews about D-Day. He died of natural causes at his Toms River home on March 1, 2011, at 91 years old.

== Honors ==
For his actions in disabling the Pointe du Hoc guns, Lomell received the U.S. Army's Distinguished Service Cross the British Military Medal, and the French Légion d'honneur. In addition to his Silver Star, Lomell also received a Bronze Star. In 1994, he was inducted into the Ranger Hall of Fame.

On December 4, 1999, the Borough of Point Pleasant Beach, New Jersey dedicated a monument to Lomell at the Veterans Park on Arnold Avenue. The Monument has a replica of the grapnel hook used by the Rangers at Pointe Du Hoc, which was given by the residents of Grandcamp-Maisy, France, along with a plaque detailing the contribution that Lomell made during the war effort.

In 2007, Lomell received an honorary Doctor of Humanities degree from Monmouth University.

In 2012, Ocean County officials honored Lomell's memory by naming a newly created connector road at Garden State Parkway Exit 83 "Lomell Lane."
