= Thomas Hatfield (disambiguation) =

Thomas Hatfield (died 1381) was a bishop.

Thomas or Tom Hatfield may also refer to:

- Thomas M. Hatfield, American historian
- Thomas Hatfield, a character from the British TV series The Feed
- Tom Hatfield, one of the writers of the horror comedy film OMG... We're in a Horror Movie!!!

== See also ==
- Thomas Haffield, Welsh swimmer
