= Maisy battery =

WWII German fortifications in Normandy, France

Maisy Battery
- Part of Atlantic Wall
- Grandcamp-Maisy, Normandy, France
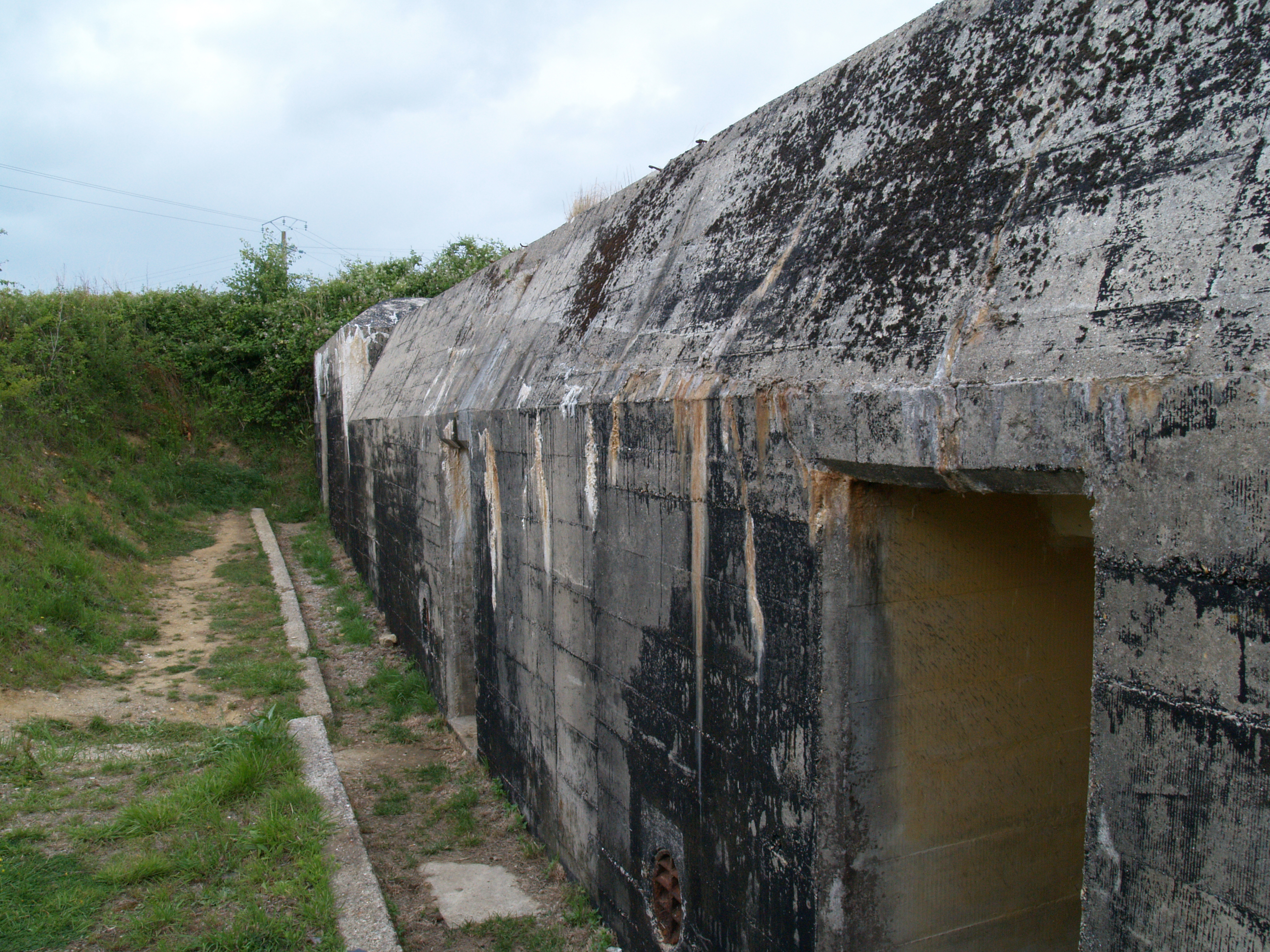
- Bunker at the Maisy Battery

Site information
- Open to the public: All casemates are open to public
- Condition: Several casemates, accommodation block, trench system

Location
- Coordinates: 49.3752°N 1.0612°W

Site history
- Built: 1942
- Built by: Organisation Todt
- In use: 1942-44
- Materials: Concrete and steel
- Battles/wars: Battle of Normandy

Garrison information
- Garrison: Wehrmacht

The Maisy Battery is a group of World War II artillery batteries that was constructed in secret by the German Wehrmacht near the French village of Grandcamp-Maisy in Normandy.

It formed a part of Germany's Atlantic Wall coastal fortifications and was sited to defend the Vire estuary. It is located between Omaha Beach and Utah Beach, which were two of the five landing sites for the Allied invasion of Normandy in June 1944.

== Pre-invasion planning ==
Anticipating an Allied invasion of Nazi-occupied Europe from the United Kingdom during World War II, the Germans built an extensive system of defenses. The Maisy Battery was built in particular secrecy, under strict security, using forced labour brought in from the Soviet Union, Czechoslovakia and Poland. This avoided any local involvement that might reveal the existence of the site to the French Resistance and, through them, to the Allies.

By the time of preparations for D-Day of Operation Neptune, the Wehrmacht-run battery was marked on the Allied D-Day maps as a Rangers D-Day target - confirmed in records found in the early 21st century. Prior to D-Day, the Germans had drawn significant attention to the gun battery at nearby Pointe du Hoc, a clifftop site overlooking the English Channel, as compared to the slightly inland site of the Maisy battery. By the time of the invasion, Pointe du Hoc was manned by a token force of troops, and the artillery pieces had been moved to other sites, replaced by dummy guns.

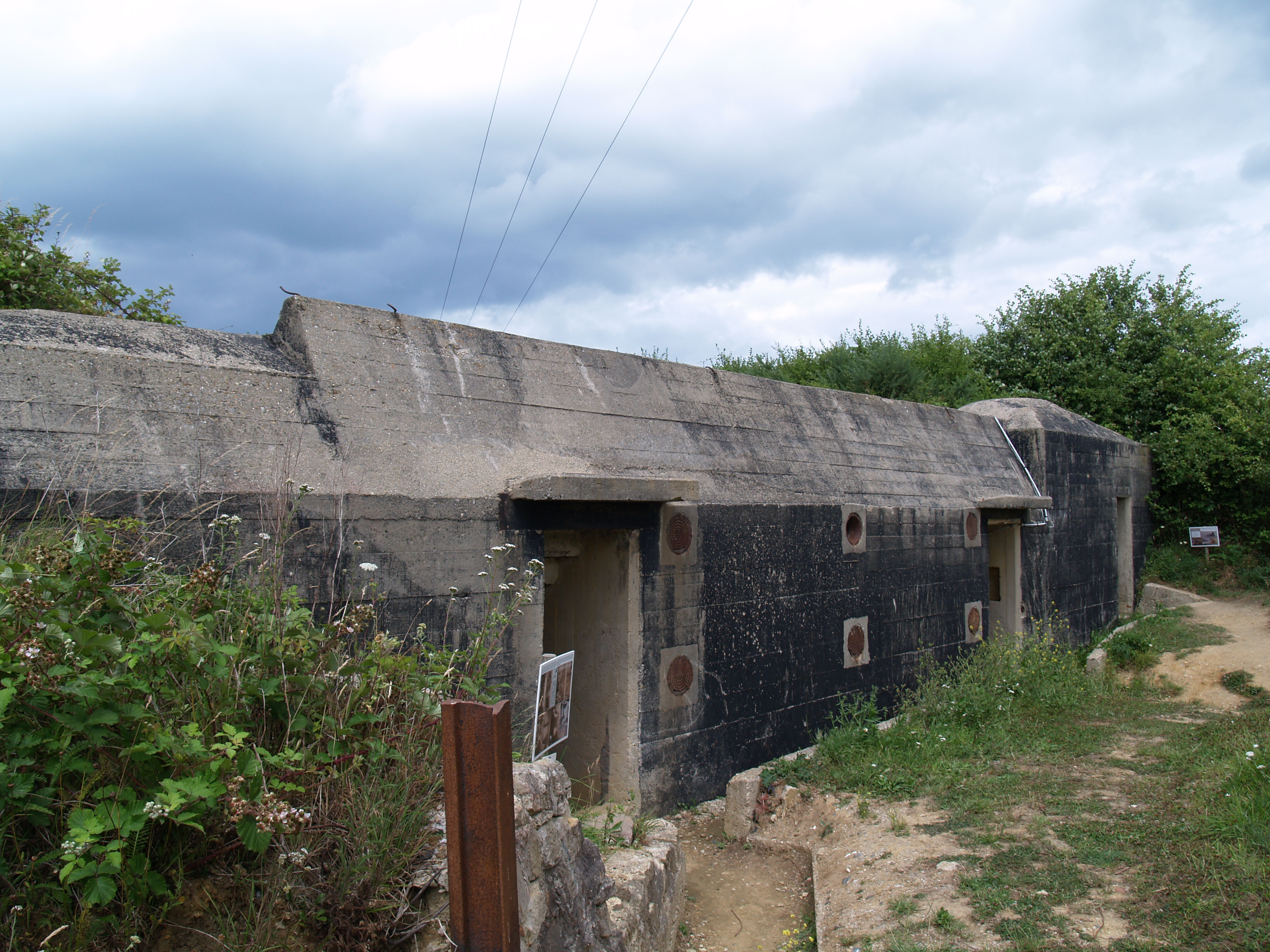
Command bunker

The Maisy site actually consisted of three batteries, Les Perruques, La Martiniere and Foucher Farm, labeled as Allied targets 5, 16 and 16A respectively. The battery at Les Perruques, which was designated by the Germans as WN83, Widerstandsnest 83 (Resistance Nest 83), included six 155 mm First World War French field howitzers. The battery at La Martiniere, designated WN84, included four 105 mm pieces. Four 150 mm pieces were located at Foucher Farm.

== Normandy landings ==
The battery is located 3.58 miles (5.76 km) from Pointe du Hoc, a key objective for the US Rangers during D-Day, and approximately 7 miles from the western-most boundary of Omaha Beach proper. The battery was garrisoned by elements of the 352nd and 716th Infantry and Artillery Divisions, plus Flak Regiment No. 1 consisting of twelve 88-mm anti-aircraft artillery pieces sent to protect the battery shortly before D-Day on 5 June 1944.

Fouchers' Farm was destroyed by naval shelling from the USS Shubrick (DD-639) on 7 June 1944. The other two sites remained operational until they were assaulted by the US 2nd Rangers and the US 5th Rangers on 9 June.

While the Rangers AARs make no mention of other units involvement, the 1 Bn 116th Inf Regt 29th Inf Division were also involved in the assault, coming in from the southeast.

The batteries at Maisy were D-Day mission objective Number 6 as given to Colonel James Rudder in his Operation Neptune intelligence and US 1st Infantry Division orders. However, he did not brief his men to carry out the mission to Maisy. Historian Gary Sterne, in a book published in 2014, suggests that Rudder disobeyed orders calling on him to continue to Maisy after taking Pointe du Hoc. The Rangers stayed at Pointe du Hoc for some days until relieved which kept them from completing their D-day orders and away from the Maisy site - as well as the D-day Phase Line which was their main target for the evening of 6 June. This allowed the guns at Maisy to continue to shell troops in both the Omaha Beach and Utah Beach sectors for three days after the landings. Rudder always claimed that his orders called on him to hold the highway against a possible counterattack against Pointe du Hoc, but Sterne and subsequent historians could not find any such order in the US National Archives.

== Rediscovery ==
The British amateur military historian Gary Sterne rediscovered Maisy Battery in January 2004, after buying a US Army veteran's uniform and finding a hand-drawn map inside the same box. The battery was about 1 mile (1.6 km) inland from the sea near Grandcamp-Maisy, marked on the map as an "Area of high resistance".

Prior to D-Day, the battery complex was well-known to Allied planners who gave its component batteries the designations “Target 5,” “Target 16,” and “Target 16a” on the Allied bombing plan. Using the old map, Sterne was able to locate a bunker entrance amongst the undergrowth. Sterne then investigated further and found additional fortified buildings, gun platforms, and a hospital. Over 3 kilometres of trenches were uncovered. Sterne subsequently purchased the land himself in order to profit on this area and the story he believes occurred there.

In June 2006, the site was opened for the first time to visitors, with the battery site at Les Perruques an ongoing tourist attraction.
