= Pointe du Hoc =

Promontory in Normandy, D-Day objective

Coordinates: 49°23′45″N 0°59′20″W

Battle of Pointe du Hoc
- Part of the Normandy Landings
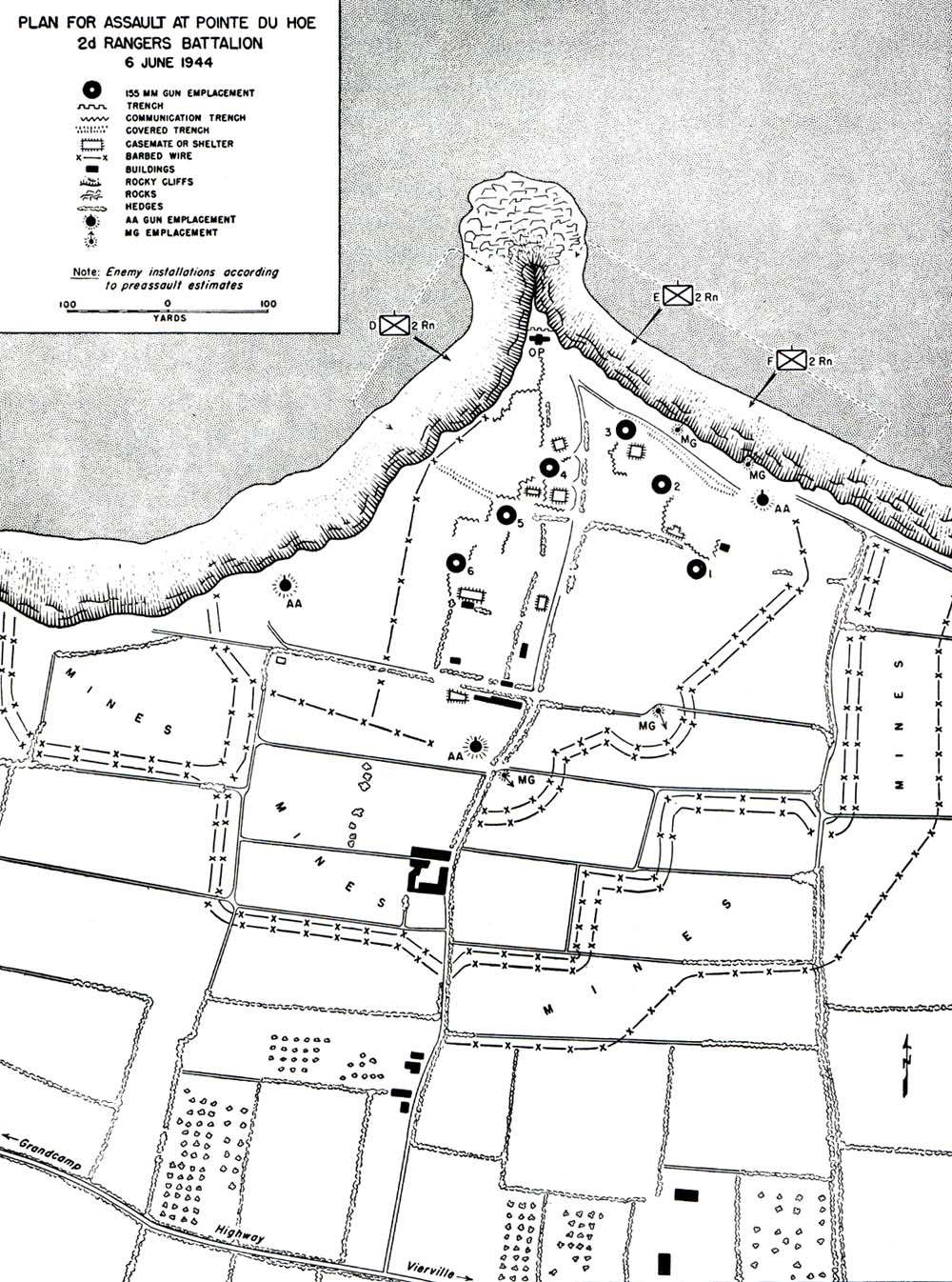
- Map of Pointe du Hoc, showing German installations and what was believed to be the locations of the 155 mm guns.
Date	June 6, 1944
Location	Normandy, France
Result	Allied victory

Belligerents
United States; United Kingdom	Germany

Commanders and leaders
(United Kingdom) Bernard Montgomery; James Earl Rudder	(Nazi Germany) Gerd von Rundstedt (Nazi Germany) Dietrich Kraiss

Units involved
Army Rangers: 2nd Ranger Battalion; Royal Navy: 520 Assault Flotilla; 522 Assault Flotilla	(Nazi Germany) 352nd Division: 914th Grenadier Regiment

Strength
225 infantry 12 Landing Craft Assault; 1 Landing Craft Tank; 4 DUKW; 1 Fairmile B motor launch Offshore US and Royal Navy bombardment	200 infantry 4 machine gun emplacements 6 empty casemates 1 observation bunker

Casualties and losses
77 killed and 152 wounded 2 Landing Craft Assault; 1 DUKW	Landing: 25+ Counter-attacks: 50+ Germans killed and 40 captured. Unknown number of alleged French collaborators executed.

La Pointe du Hoc (French pronunciation: [pwɛ̃t dy ɔk]) is a promontory with a 35-metre (110 ft) cliff overlooking the English Channel on the northwestern coast of Normandy in the Calvados department, France.

In World War II, Pointe du Hoc was the location of a series of German bunkers and machine gun posts. Prior to the invasion of Normandy, the German army fortified the area with concrete casemates and gun pits. On D-Day, the United States Army Provisional Ranger Group attacked and captured Pointe du Hoc after scaling the cliffs. United States generals including Dwight D. Eisenhower Titouan/jpat had determined that the place housed artillery that could slow down nearby beach attacks.

== Background ==
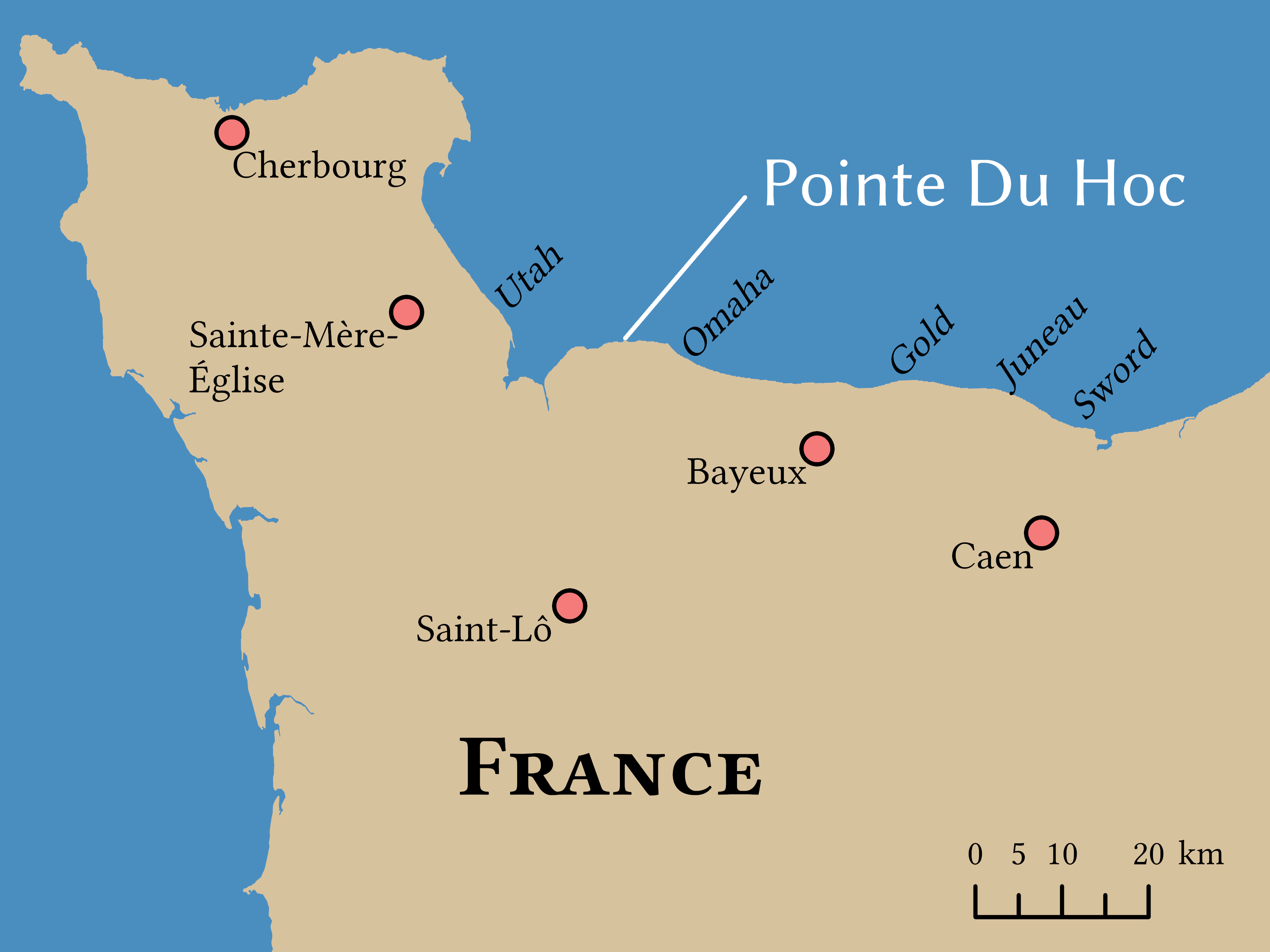
Pointe du Hoc location

Pointe du Hoc lies 6.5 km (4.0 miles) west of the center of Omaha Beach. As part of the Atlantic Wall fortifications, the prominent cliff top location was fortified by the Germans.

The battery was initially built in 1943 to house six captured French First World War vintage GPF 155 mm K418(f) guns positioned in open concrete gun pits. The battery was garrisoned by the 2nd Battery of Army Coastal Artillery Battalion 1260 (Heeres-Küsten-Artillerie-Abteilung 1260 or 2/HKAA.1260). To defend the promontory from attack, elements of the 352nd Infantry Division were also stationed at the battery.

== Prelude ==
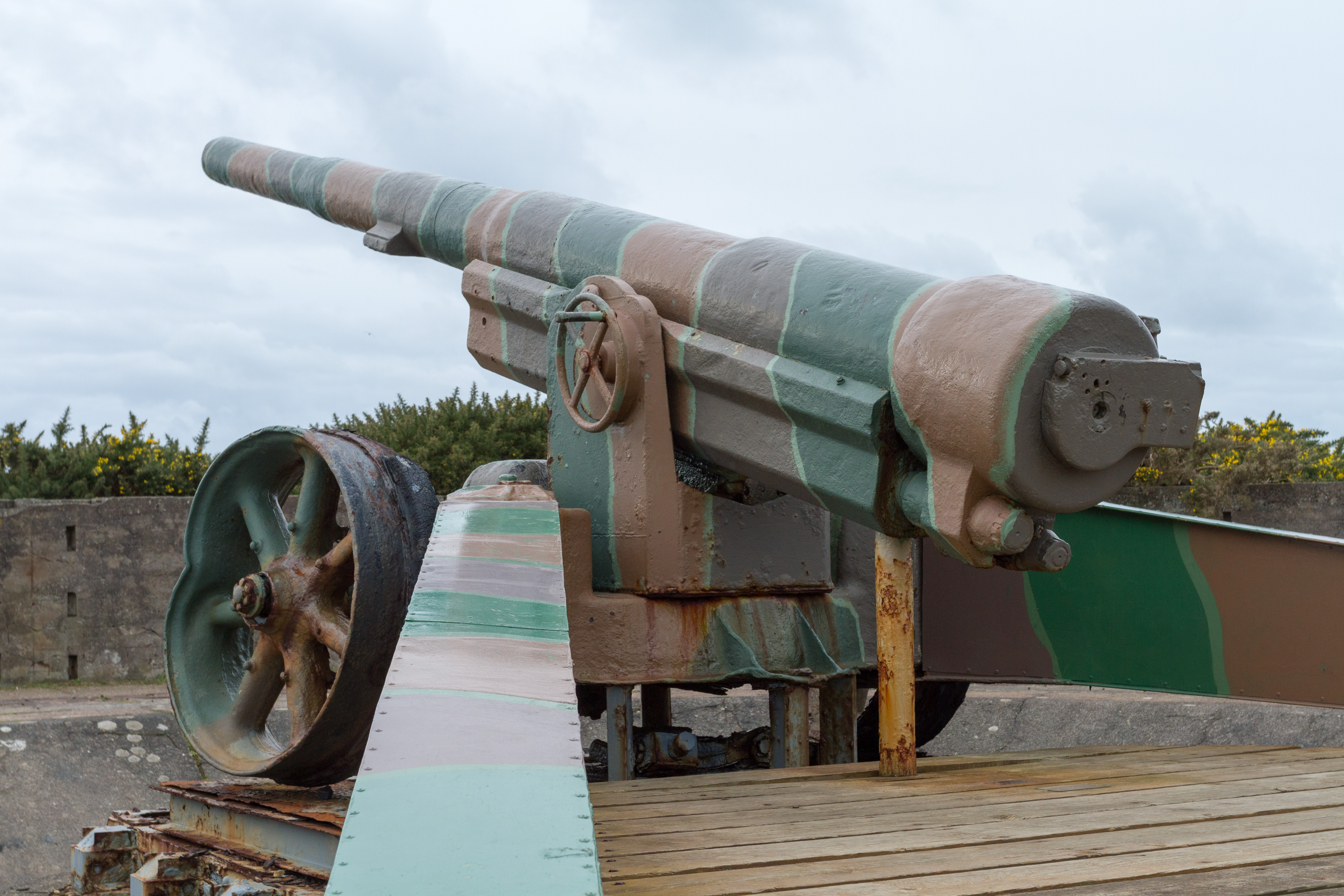
A 15.5 cm K 418(f) gun, of the type used in the Pointe du Hoc battery, is preserved at the Atlantic Wall on Jersey.

To provide increased defensive capability, the Germans began to improve the defenses of the battery in the spring of 1944, with enclosed H671 concrete casemates being started and the older 155 mm guns displaced. The plan was to build six casemates but two were unfinished when the location was attacked. The casemates were built over and in front of the circular gun pits, which housed the 155 mm guns.

Also built was a H636 observation bunker and L409a mounts for 20 mm Flak 30 anti-aircraft guns. The 155 mm guns would have threatened the Allied landings on Omaha and Utah beaches when finished, risking heavy casualties to the landing forces.

In the months before D-Day the Germans were recorded by Allied Intelligence removing their guns one by one as they re-developed the site with the final aim of four casemates facing Utah Beach and the possibility of two 155 mm guns in open emplacements. The U.S. 2nd and 5th Ranger Battalions were given the task of assaulting the strong point early on D-Day. Elements of the 2nd Battalion went in to attack Pointe du Hoc but delays meant the remainder of the 2nd Battalion and the complete 5th Battalion landed at Omaha Beach as their secondary landing position.

Though the Germans had removed the main armament from Pointe du Hoc, the beachheads were shelled by field artillery from the nearby Maisy battery, which was fired on by the heavy cruiser HMS Hawkins. The rediscovery of the battery at Maisy has shown that it was responsible for firing on the Allied beachheads until 9 June 1944. (Note: The Maisy site actually consisted of three batteries, Les Perruques, La Martiniere and Foucher Farm, labeled as Allied targets 5, 16 and 16A respectively. The battery at Les Perrugues, which was designated by the Germans as WN83, Widerstandsnest 83 (Resistance Nest 83), included six 155 mm First World War French field howitzers. The battery at La Martiniere, designated WN84, included four 105 mm pieces. Four 150 mm pieces were located at Foucher Farm. The Fouchers' Farm was destroyed by naval shelling from USS Shubrick on 7 June 1944. The other two sites remained operational until they were assaulted by the US 2nd Ranger Battalion and the US 5th Ranger Battalion on 9 June.)

== Plan ==
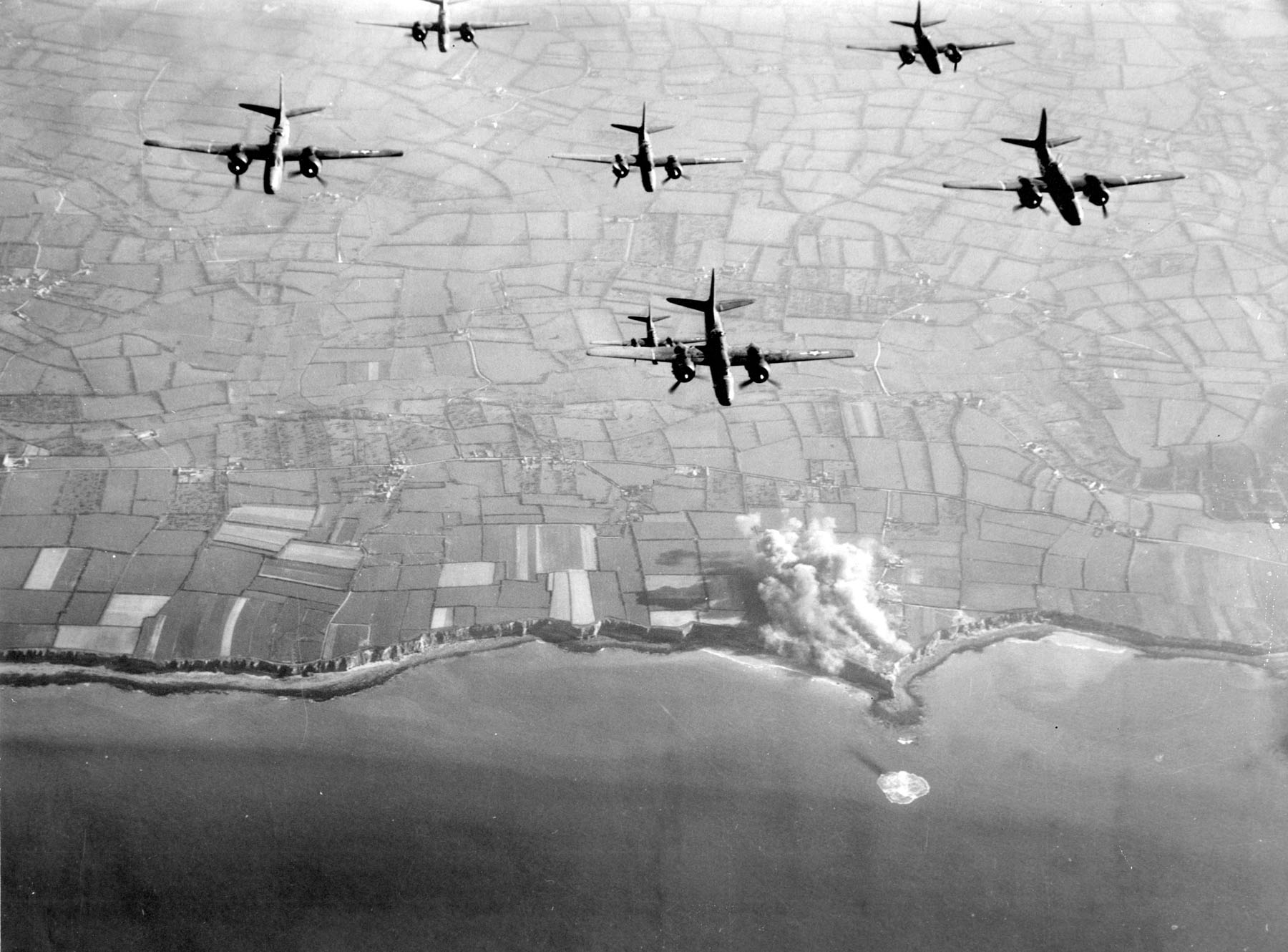
Pre-invasion bombing of Pointe du Hoc by 9th Air Force A-20 Havoc bombers

Plan for the assault at Pointe du Hoc, map shows the pre-assault intelligence estimates of German defenses, minefields, and gun emplacements.

Pointe du Hoc lay within General Leonard Gerow's V Corps field of operations. This then went to the 1st Infantry Division (the Big Red One) and then down to the right-hand assault formation, the 116th Infantry Regiment attached from 29th Division. In addition they were given two Ranger battalions to undertake the attack.

The Ranger battalions were commanded by Lieutenant Colonel James Earl Rudder. The plan called for the three companies of Rangers to be landed by sea at the foot of the cliffs, scale them using ropes, ladders, and grapples while under enemy fire, and engage the enemy at the top of the cliff. This was to be carried out before the main landings. The Rangers trained for the cliff assault on the Isle of Wight, under the direction of British Commandos.

Major Cleveland A. Lytle was to command Companies D, E and F of the 2nd Ranger Battalion (known as "Force A") in the assault at Pointe du Hoc. During a briefing aboard the Landing Ship Infantry TSS Ben My Chree, he heard that French Resistance sources reported the guns had been removed. Impelled to some degree by alcohol, Lytle became quite vocal that the assault would be unnecessary and suicidal and was relieved of his command at the last minute by Provisional Ranger Force commander Rudder. Rudder felt that Lytle could not convincingly lead a force with a mission that he did not believe in. Lytle was later transferred to the 90th Infantry Division where he was awarded the Distinguished Service Cross.

== Battle ==
=== Landings ===
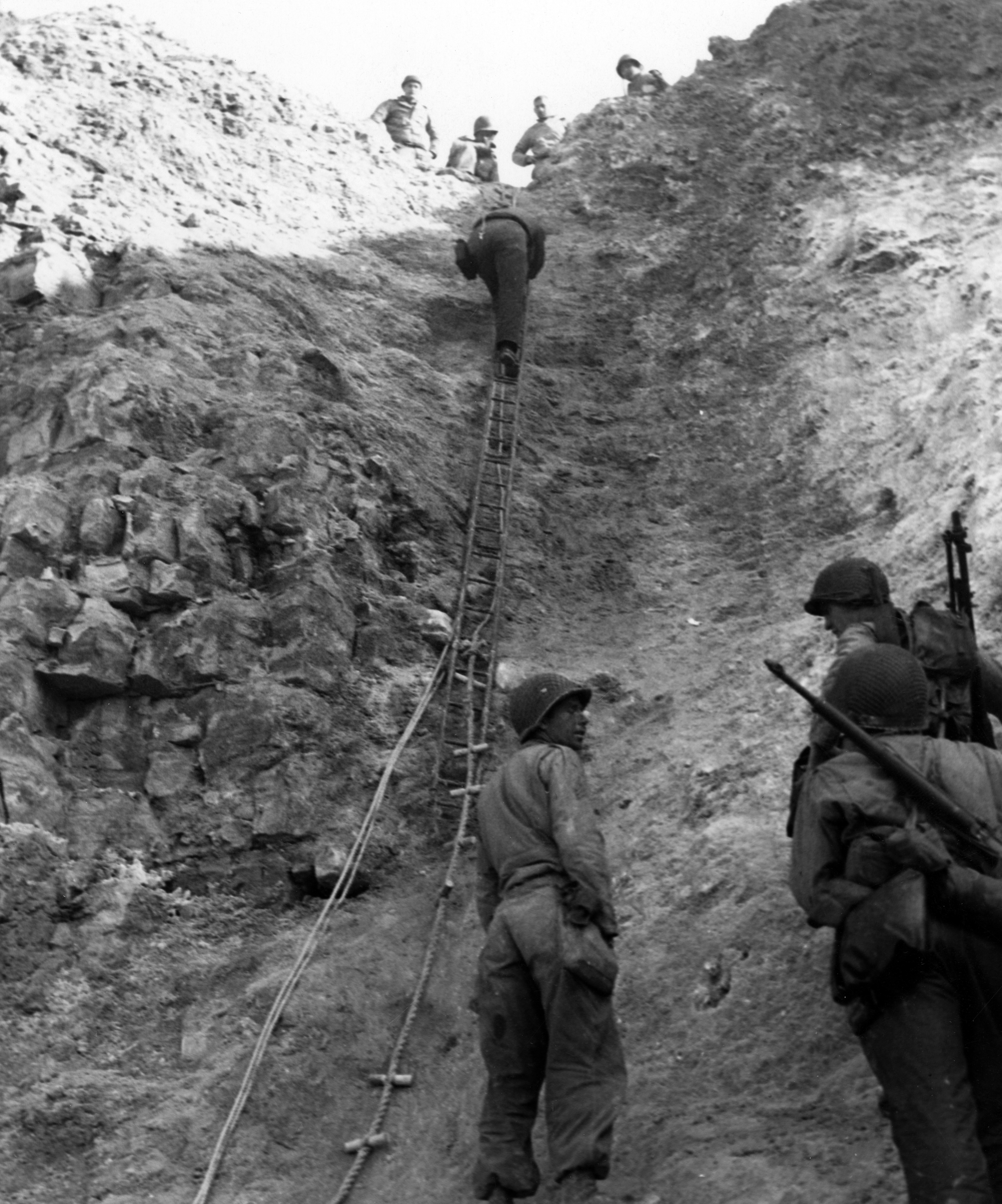
Rangers from 2nd Ranger Battalion demonstrate the rope ladders they used to scale Pointe du Hoc

The assault force was carried in ten landing craft, with another two carrying supplies and four DUKW amphibious trucks carrying the 100-foot (30 m) ladders requisitioned from the London Fire Brigade. One landing craft carrying troops sank, drowning all but one of its occupants; another was swamped. One supply craft sank and the other put the stores overboard to stay afloat. German fire sank one of the DUKWs. Once within a mile of the shore, German mortars and machine guns fired on the craft.These initial setbacks resulted in a 40-minute delay in landing at the base of the cliffs, but British landing craft carrying the Rangers finally reached the base of the cliffs at 7:10 am with approximately half the force it started out with. The landing craft were fitted with rocket launchers to fire grapnels and ropes up the cliffs. As the Rangers scaled the cliffs, the Allied ships USS Texas, USS Satterlee, USS Ellyson, and HMS Talybont provided them with fire support in an attempt to prevent the German defenders above from firing down on the assaulting troops. The cliffs proved to be higher than the ladders could reach.

=== Attack ===
The original plans had also called for an additional, larger Ranger force of eight companies (Companies A and B of the 2nd Ranger Battalion and the entire 5th Ranger Battalion) to follow the first attack, if successful. Flares from the cliff tops were to signal this second wave to join the attack, but because of the delayed landing, the signal came too late, and the other Rangers landed on Omaha instead of Pointe du Hoc. The added impetus these 500-plus Rangers provided on the stalled Omaha Beach landing has been conjectured to have averted a disastrous failure there, since they carried the assault beyond the beach, into the overlooking bluffs and outflanked the German defenses.

When the Rangers made it to the top at Pointe du Hoc, they had sustained 15 casualties. "Ranger casualties on the beach totaled about 15, most of them from the raking fire to their left". The force also found that their radios were ineffective. Upon reaching the fortifications, most of the Rangers learned for the first time that the main objective of the assault, the artillery battery, had been removed. The Rangers regrouped at the top of the cliffs, and a small patrol went off in search of the guns. Two different patrols found five of the six guns nearby (the sixth was being repaired) and destroyed their firing mechanisms with thermite grenades.

The Small Unit Actions Report, written by US Army Intelligence, states that there were times (some hours) when the Rangers did not see a single German after the initial fighting. Amateur Historian Gary Sterne suggests this gave Lt. Col. Rudder the time to have continued moving inland. This plan would have only been possible had the remainder of the 2nd Rangers come in as reinforcements, but that would have also possibly cost Omaha Beach. Despite what Sterne would suggest, after two days of fighting, 77 of the 225 soldiers that had landed at the Pointe had been killed, with another 152 wounded, indicating that there was indeed fierce fighting occurring. Thomas M. Hatfield, a senior research fellow at the Dolph Briscoe Center for American History at the University of Texas at Austin, and director of its Military History Institute, notes that the allegations that "Rudder knew of a secret intelligence report claiming the enemy guns on Pointe du Hoc had been removed, negating the necessity of an assault to destroy them," are, "entirely false." Hatfield continued, "Rudder reviewed the operations order with (Maj. Gen. Clarence) Huebner (Bradley’s designee commanding all forces going to Omaha Beach and Pointe du Hoc) for the last time on May 28, three days before loading his men onto troopships for the crossing. Records kept by Huebner’s staff reveal no indication that they questioned the presence of the fabled guns."

=== German counter-attacks ===
The costliest part of the battle for Pointe du Hoc for the Rangers came after the successful cliff assault. Determined to hold the vital high ground, yet isolated from other Allied forces, the Rangers fended off several counter-attacks from the German 914th Grenadier Regiment. The 5th Ranger Battalion and elements of the 116th Infantry Regiment headed towards Pointe du Hoc from Omaha Beach. However, only twenty-three Rangers from the 5th were able to link up with the 2nd Rangers during the evening of 6 June 1944. During the night the Germans forced the Rangers into a smaller enclave along the cliff, and some were taken prisoner.

It was not until the morning of 8 June that the Rangers at Pointe du Hoc were finally relieved by the 2nd and 5th Rangers, plus the 1st Battalion of the 116th Infantry, accompanied by tanks from the 743rd Tank Battalion.

When the Rangers began suffering heavy losses, brief consideration was given to sending in the 84-man Marine Detachment aboard the battleship USS Texas on the morning of 7 June. At the last minute, word was passed down through the Army chain of command that no Marines would be allowed to go ashore, not even providing armed escort on landing craft ferrying Army troops or supplies.

== Aftermath ==
At the end of the two-day action, the initial Ranger landing force of 225+ was reduced to about 90 fighting men. In the aftermath of the battle, some Rangers became convinced that French civilians had taken part in the fighting on the German side. A number of French civilians accused of shooting at US forces or of serving as artillery observers for the Germans were executed.

== Timeline ==
6 June 1944

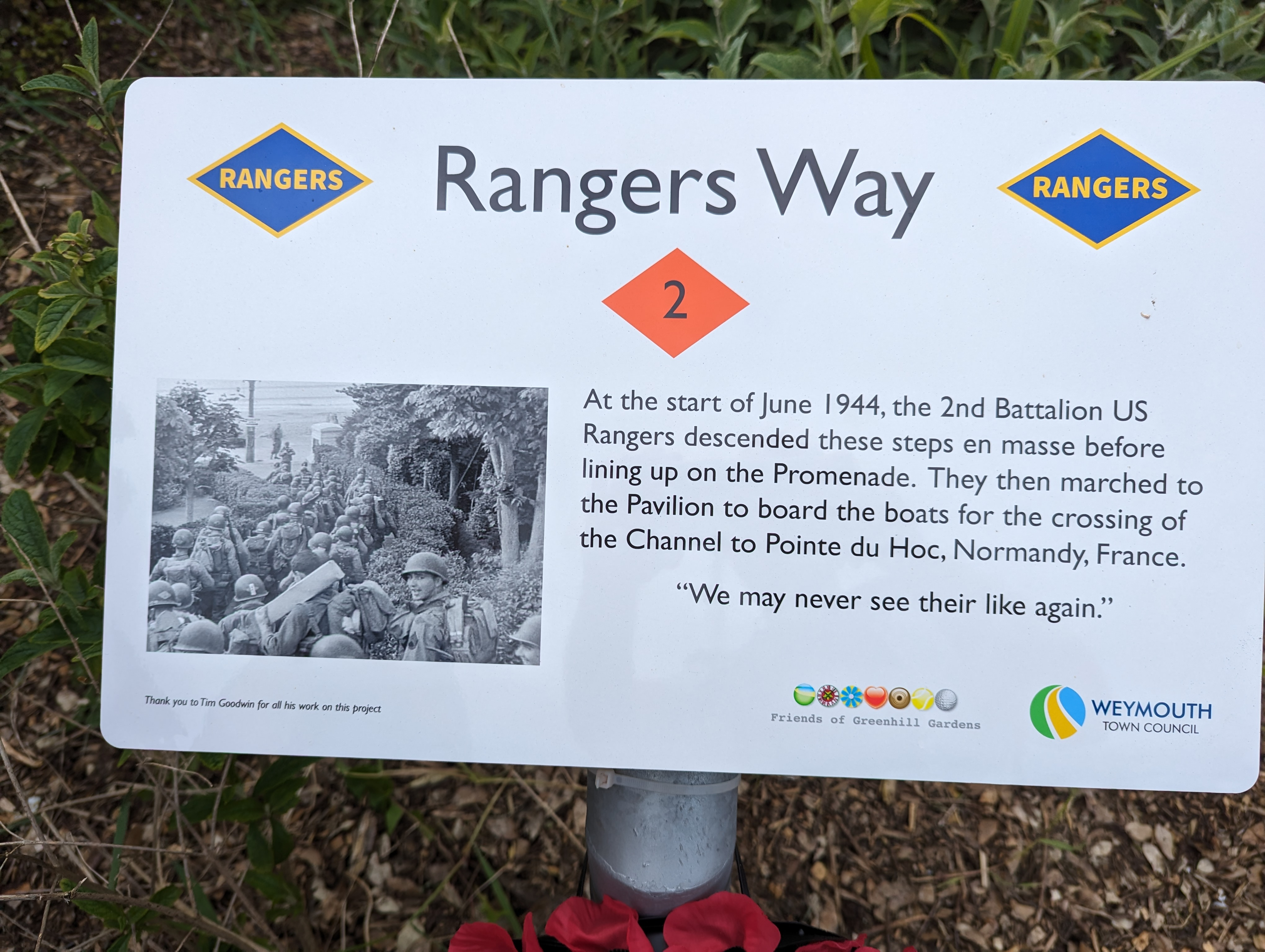
Rangers departing Weymouth, UK en route to Pointe de Hoc

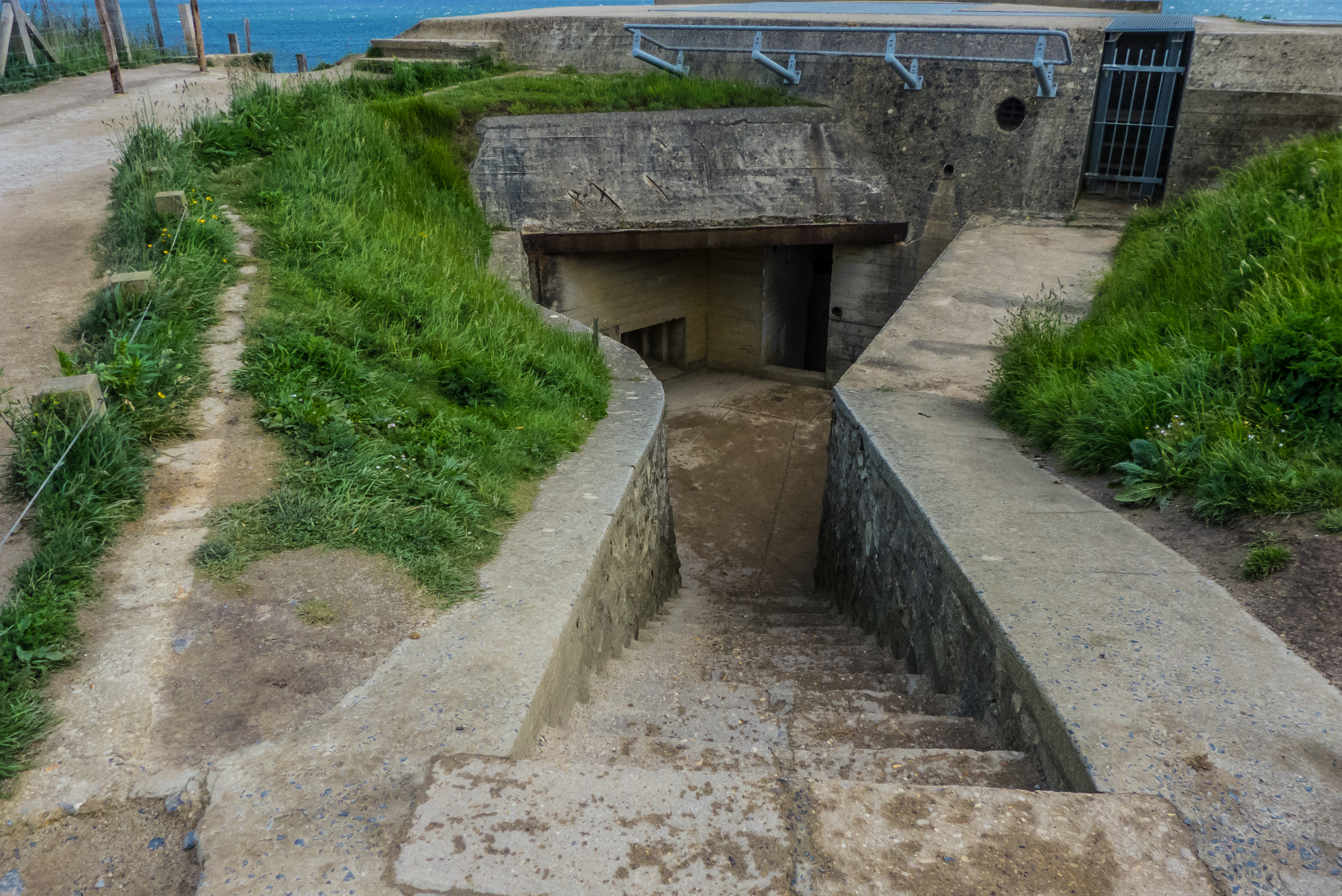
Surviving observation bunker at the Pointe du Hoc

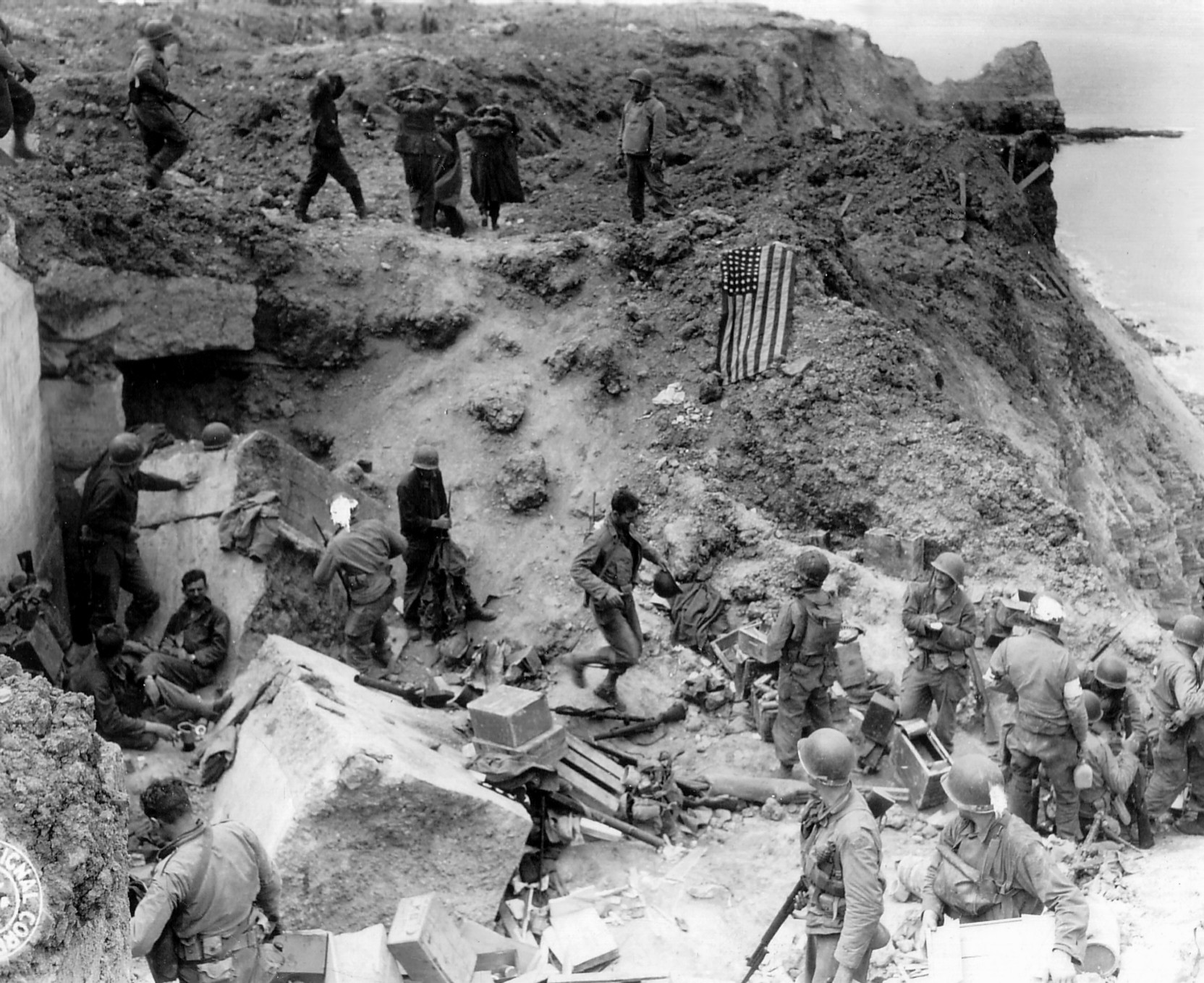
D+2, after relief forces reached the Rangers. The US flag had been spread out to stop fire of friendly tanks coming from inland.

06.39 – H-Hour – D, E and F companies of 2nd Ranger Battalion approach the Normandy coast in a flotilla of twelve craft.
07.05 – Strong tides and navigation errors mean the initial assault arrives late and the 5th Ranger Battalion as well A and B companies from 2nd Battalion move to Omaha Beach instead.
07.30 – Rangers fight their way up the cliff and reach the top and start engaging the Germans across the battery. Rangers discover the casemates are empty.
08.15 – Approximately 35 Rangers reach the road and create a roadblock.
09.00 – Five German guns are located and destroyed using thermite grenades.

Aerial view of Pointe du Hoc

For the rest of the day the Rangers repel several German counter-attacks.
During the evening, one patrol from the 5th Rangers that landed at Omaha beach make it through to join the Rangers at Pointe du Hoc.

7 June 1944
The Rangers continue to defend an even smaller area on Pointe du Hoc against German counter-attacks.
Afternoon – A platoon of Rangers arrives on an LST, with wounded removed.

8 June 1944
Morning – The Rangers are relieved by troops arriving from Omaha Beach.

== Commemoration ==
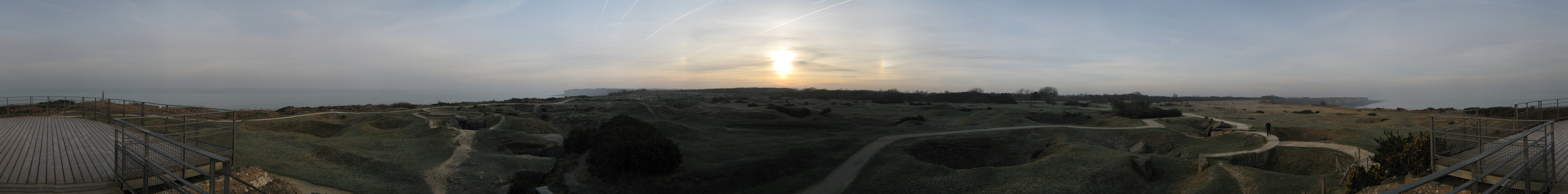
Panoramic view of Pointe du Hoc during sunrise on an early January morning on top of one of the bunkers

Pointe du Hoc now features a memorial and museum dedicated to the battle. Many of the original fortifications have been left in place and the site remains speckled with a number of bomb craters. On 11 January 1979 this 13-hectare field was transferred to American control, and the American Battle Monuments Commission was made responsible for its maintenance.

As part of the commemorations of the 75th anniversary of D-Day in 2019, members of the current 75th Ranger Regiment reenacted the climb in both period and modern uniforms.

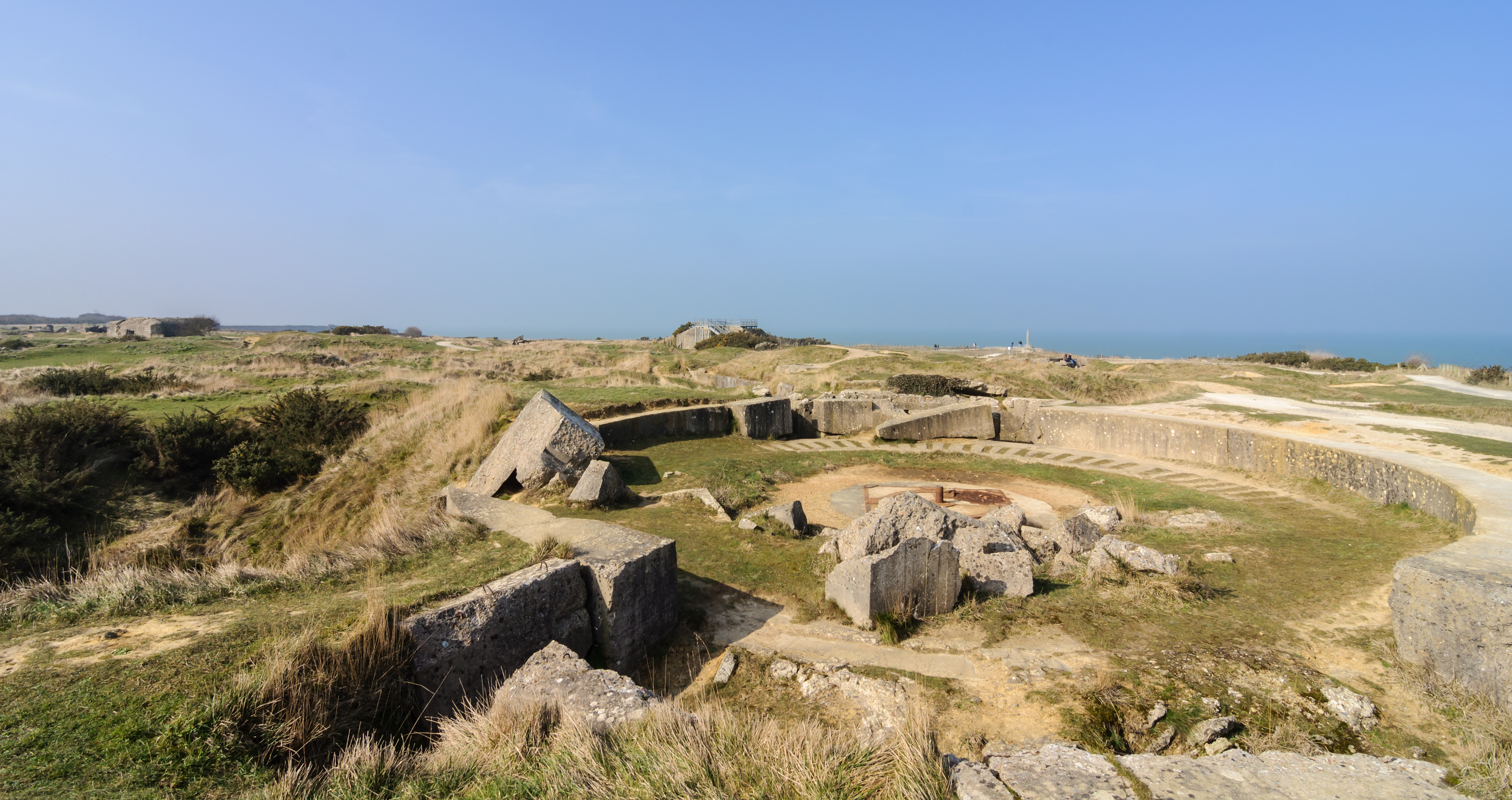
Part of the modern day site, with the remains of a gun pit in the foreground.

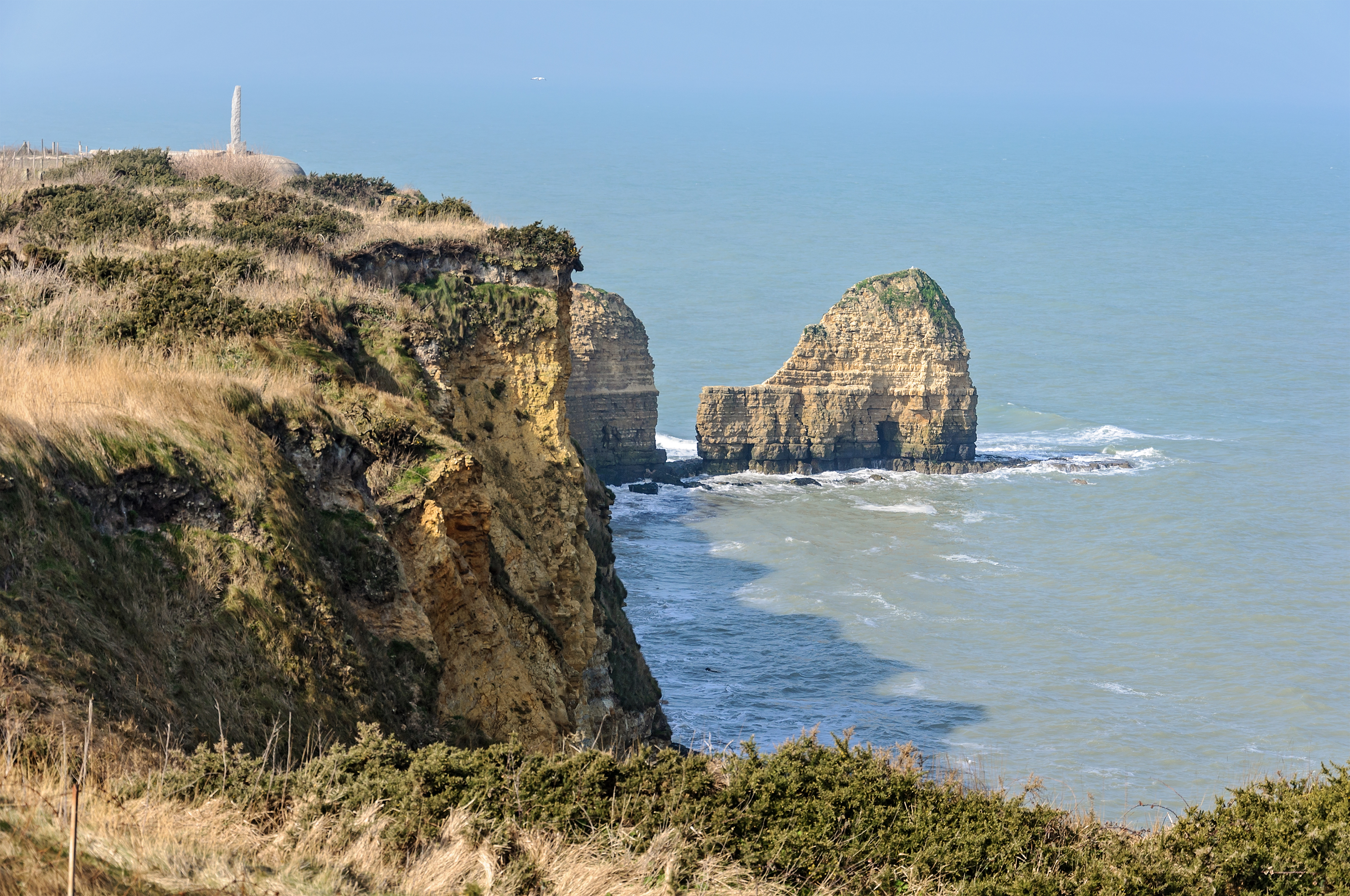
Pointe du Hoc, modern view, seen from the southeast.

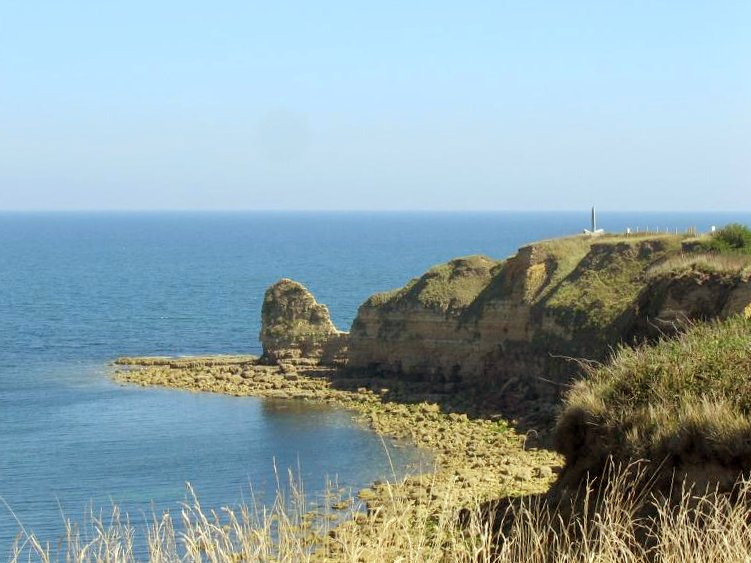
Present day view of the cliff of Pointe du Hoc with the monument on the top-right.

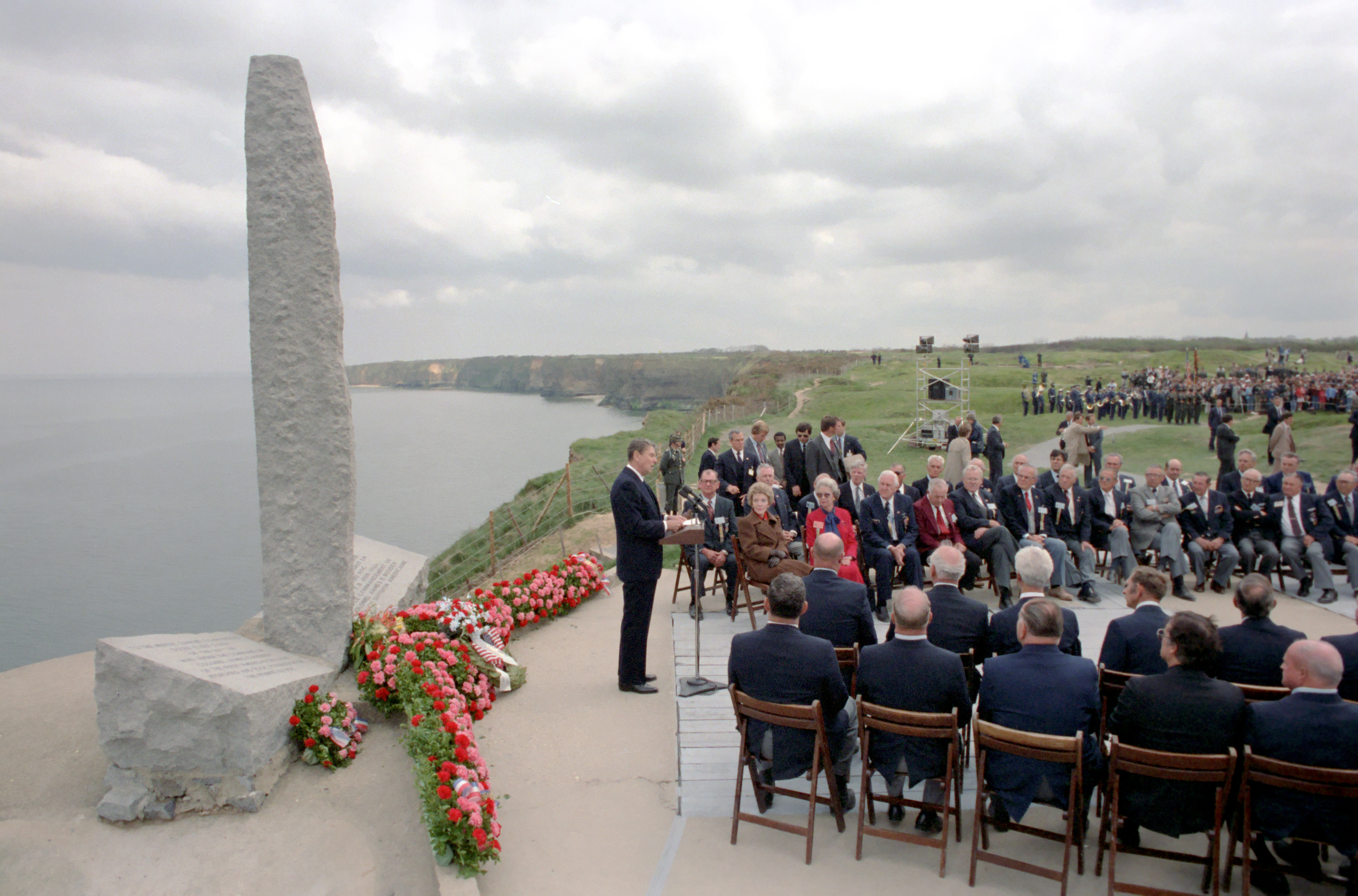
US President Ronald Reagan giving a speech commemorating the 40th anniversary of the event.
