= 7th Macho de Monte Infantry Company =

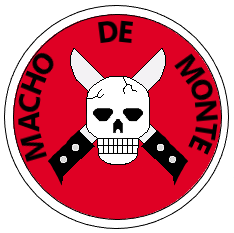
- Insignia and cap badge
- Active: April 7, 1969 – December 20, 1989
- Country: Panama
- Allegiance: Manuel Noriega
- Branch: Panama Defense Forces
- Type: Commando
- Role: Guerrilla warfare
- Size: Company
- Garrison/HQ: Rio Hato, Cocle
- Nicknames: Macho de Monte (Mountain Men)
- Mottos: "Lealtad Sin Precio Ni Duda" ("Loyalty Without Price or Doubt")
- Mascot: Baird's tapir
- Anniversaries: April 7
- Engagements: 1989 Panamanian coup d'état attempt United States invasion of Panama: Battle of Rio Hato Airfield

Commanders
- Former Commander: Major Gonzalo Gonzalez

The 7th Macho de Monte Infantry Company (Spanish: Séptima Compañía de Infantería Macho de Monte) was the only commando (special operations capable) company of the Panama Land Forces, Panama Defense Forces. Its mascot was the Baird's tapir, from which the company took it name, as in Panama the tapir is called 'Macho de Monte' which translates as 'mountain men'.

It was based at the Base Militar "General de Division Omar Torrijos Herrera" in Rio Hato and specialised in air assault operations, clandestine operations, combined arms, commando style raids on key targets, counterinsurgency in jungle and urban terrain areas, counter-revolutionary, defense against swimmer incursions, defusing and disposing of bombs or high-yield explosives, executive protection (especially the President of the Republic of Panama), guerrilla warfare in jungle and urban terrain areas, joint combat operation with infantry mobility vehicle (IMV) or military light utility vehicle, maneuver warfare, naval boarding, reconnaissance and surveillance, special reconnaissance, support crowd control and riot control, tracking targets to frontline military intelligence gathering or raiding, and underwater demolition.

It was disbanded alongside the rest of the Panama Defense Forces on December 20, 1989, following the United States invasion of Panama.

== History ==
The 7th Macho de Monte Infantry Company was founded on April 7, 1969, as part of the National Guard of Panama by General Omar Torrijos who had seized power in a coup in 1968.

The unit's first leader was Ediberto del Cid who had supported Torrijos. Following Manuel Noriega's seizure of power and transformation of the National Guard into the Panama Defense Forces in 1983 the unit was built into an elite light infantry company.

During the 1989 Panamanian coup attempt the company sided with Noriega and were deployed by air assault operations to Panama City to quell the coup attempt and to dislodge the entrenched rebels from the Central Barracks.

Their performance during the coup attempt showed the unit to be one of Noriega's most loyal and as a result it became the only commando unit of the Panama Land Forces that specialising in guerilla warfare in case of US intervention.

The company, along with the whole of the Panama Defense Forces, was disbanded on December 20, 1989, following the United States invasion of Panama. During the invasion the company took part in the Battle of Rio Hato Airfield. The battle lasted for 5 hours and featured room-to-room combat as United States Army Rangers attempted to secure the Rio Hato military base.

== Structure ==
The 7th Macho de Monte Infantry Company was structured as follows:

- Headquarters and Service Company
  - 1 Inner Guard Platoon
  - 1 Mortar Platoon
  - 3 Rifle Platoons
  - Special Service Sections
    - 1 Commando Section
    - 1 Commando Frogmen Section
    - 1 Explosive Ordnance Disposal (EOD) Section
    - 1 Motorized Section - "Cocuyos Montaneros"
    - 1 Pana-Jungle Section

== Training ==
7th Macho de Monte Infantry Company is one of the longest and most arduous training programmes in the Panama Land Forces. The programme is intended to train recruits who wish to enter the Special Service Sections in all skills required to become an army commando and army commando frogmen.
