= Grandcamp-Maisy =

- Commune
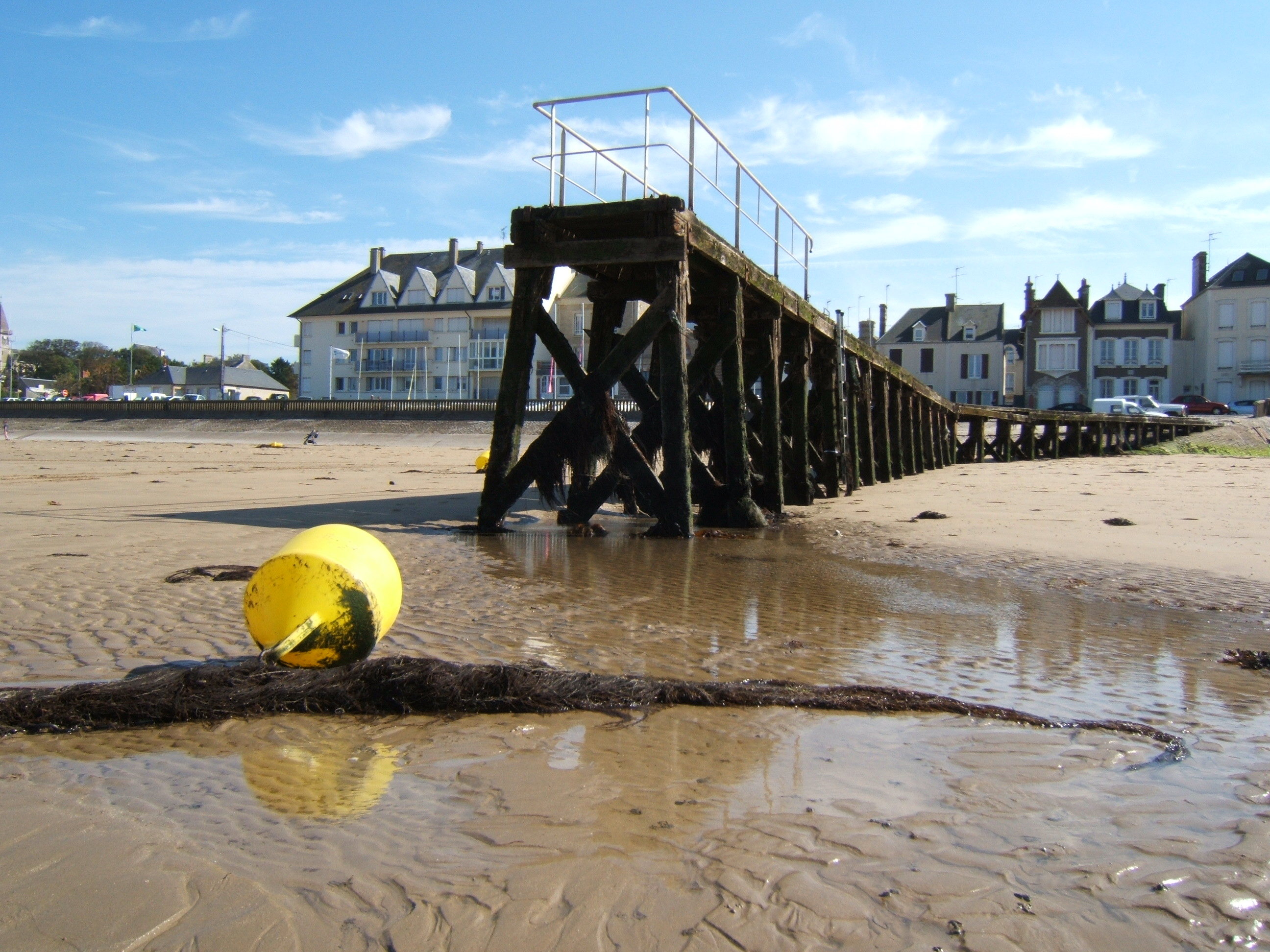
- The small jetty, to the east of the beach at Grandcamp

- Coat of arms
- Location of Grandcamp-Maisy
- Location within France Location within Normandy
- Coordinates: 49°23′N 1°02′W
- Country: France
- Region: Normandy
- Department: Calvados
- Arrondissement: Bayeux
- Canton: Trévières
- Intercommunality: CC Isigny-Omaha Intercom

Government
  - Mayor (2026–32): Benoît Tuvée
- Area^{1}: 14.85 km^{2} (5.73 sq mi)
- Elevation: 50 m (160 ft)
- Highest elevation: 34 m (112 ft)
- Lowest elevation: 0 m (0 ft)
- Population (2023): 1,522
  - Density: 102.5/km^{2} (265.5/sq mi)
- Time zone: UTC+01:00 (CET)
  - Summer (DST): UTC+02:00 (CEST)
- INSEE/Postal code: 14312 /14450
- ^{1} French Land Register data, which excludes lakes, ponds, glaciers > 1 km^{2} (0.386 sq mi or 247 acres) and river estuaries.

Grandcamp-Maisy (French pronunciation: [ɡʁɑ̃kɑ̃ mɛzi]) is a commune in the Calvados department in the Normandy region in northwestern France.

== Geography ==
Grandcamp-Maisy is located on the coast, 9 kilometres (5.6 mi) northeast of Isigny-sur-Mer and 4 kilometres (2.5 mi) west of Pointe du Hoc. It is an active fishing port, with a fish market located on the harbour side.

== History ==
On 1 November 1972, the commune formerly known as Grandcamp-les-Bains amalgamated with Maisy (Its old INSEE code was 14392) and changed its name to Grandcamp-Maisy.

=== World War II ===
In 1944 the town of Maisy was the site of a hidden German heavy artillery battery and the headquarters for the sector. Until early in the 21st century, the site was overgrown and had been covered by US engineers before the end of 1944 - well before any historians had a chance to examine the site.

British military historian Gary Sterne rediscovered the site after finding an American invasion map, and purchased the site and turned it into a museum with over 2 1/2 miles of original German trenches and bunkers.

From his research and released (previously top secret) papers, the site is many times larger than was originally thought. The labyrinth of trenches and tunnels had remained hidden for around 60 years. It contains office bunkers, supplies buildings, general quarters, radio rooms, and many other blocks, including an underground hospital (one of three which has been uncovered and can be visited).

It may well be that when all the site is cleared and all the bunkers that are buried are rediscovered, this site will be one of the largest on the Atlantic Wall in the invasion area. The sheer size of the site poses many questions as to why it does not feature more prominently in Allied records - or why it was so well camouflaged - equally why the site did not have more attention paid to it by the Allies.

The site was bombed, but not hit to any extent before D-Day. On the morning of 6 June 1944, HMS Hawkins claimed to have put the guns out of action, but Maisy was hit with shells for a further three days by many navy ships. The three casemates on the left side of the site (La Martinière) show no sign of damage from the front, only superficial damage from the east when the Rangers attacked across the fields on foot. This was the direction from which the battery was attacked by the men of the 5th Rangers on the morning of 9 June - along with halftracks from the 2nd Btn.

Despite this, in the Royal Navy History of D-Day it states that HMS Hawkins silenced the battery on D-Day, despite the fact that many other ships claimed to have done the same thing over many days. Hawkins also claimed to have put the battery at St Martin de Varreville out of action, but it is a well-known fact that the guns were not there on the morning of D-Day and had been moved further inland. The town became the headquarters of General Bradley after it was liberated on 9 June.

The site has been excavated and was opened as a museum in April 2007.

== Population ==
Historical population
Year	Pop.	±% p.a.
1968	1,880	—
1975	1,809	−0.55%
1982	1,845	+0.28%
1990	1,881	+0.24%
1999	1,831	−0.30%
2007	1,782	−0.34%
2012	1,769	−0.15%
2017	1,563	−2.45%
2023	1,522	−0.44%
Source: INSEE

== Sights ==
- 13th-century Church of Saint-Malo (Létanville), listed as a historical monument.

The church was donated between 1154 and 1189 by Richard du Hommet to the Priory of Saint-Fromond.

- 19th-century Church of Notre-Dame (Grandcamp) and post-World War II reconstruction.
- Church of Saint-Germain (Maisy) (13th-century chancel, reconstruction), listed as a historical monument.
- Grave of Commander Philippe Kieffer.
- Remains of Bertrand du Guesclin's house.

== See also ==
- Communes of the Calvados department
