= Battle of Rio Hato Airfield =

Battle during December 1989 US invasion of Panama

- Part of the United States invasion of Panama
- Battle of Rio Hato Airfield (Panama)
Date	20 December 1989
Location	Rio Hato, Panama
Result	American victory

Belligerents
United States	Panama

Commanders and leaders
(United States) Col. William F. Kernan	(Panama) Maj. Gonzalo Gonzalez

Units involved
75th Ranger Regiment: 2nd Ranger Battalion; 3rd Ranger Battalion; Company A; Company B	Panama Defense Forces: 6th Mechanized Expeditionary Infantry Company; 7th Macho de Monte Infantry Company

Strength
837 Rangers; 13 C-130 transport planes 2 AC-130H gunships 2 F-117A airplanes 2 AH-64 helicopters 2 MH-6 helicopters	520 soldiers 19 armoured vehicles 11 ZPU AA guns

Casualties and losses
4 killed 44 wounded	34 killed 362 captured 200+ escaped
- 43 civilians detained

The Battle of Rio Hato Airfield took place as an opening action of the United States invasion of Panama, and was fought between the U.S military and the Panama Defense Forces (PDF) on 20 December 1989. The action saw US paratroopers launch a surprise attack against the PDF at Rio Hato, the largest PDF military base in the country, approximately seventy miles south of Panama City.

The objective of the attack was to capture the PDF garrison at the base, secure the Rio Hato airfield runway, and seize dictator Manuel Noriega's beachside house.

== Background ==
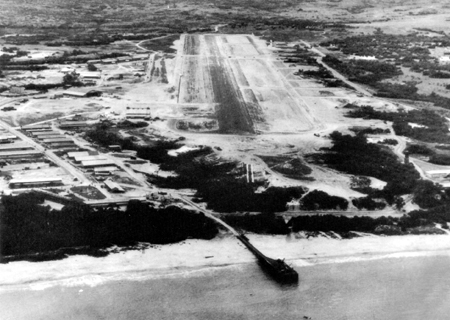
Rio Hato army air base in 1940

Established in 1931, during World War II, Río Hato Army Air Base was used by the United States Army Air Forces Sixth Air Force as part of the defense of the Panama Canal. It was closed as an active Air Force facility in 1948 and transferred to Panama, but it was still used as an USAF auxiliary military landing field as late as 1990 as part of Howard Air Force Base.

The PDF 6th and 7th Infantry companies numbered a total of 520 troops total and where both based at Base Militar "General de Division Omar Torrijos Herrera" at Rio Hato. The 7th company was known to be a "part of Noriega's best trained and most loyal forces" following their actions during the attempted coup in October 1989 when they sided with Noreiga and were deployed by air assault operations to Panama City to quell the coup attempt and to dislodge the entrenched rebels from the Central Barracks.

Their performance during the coup attempt showed the unit to be one of Noriega's most loyal and as a result it became the only commando unit of the Panama Land Forces that specialising in guerilla warfare in case of US intervention.

As a result Rio Hato became a primary target to neutralise the threat from the two infantry companies.

== Preparation ==
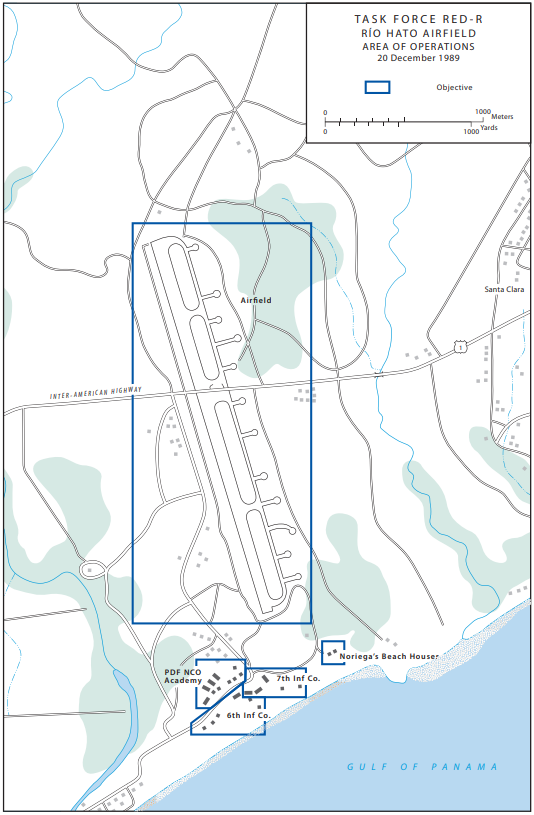
Map showing the American objectives.

United States Army 2d and 3d Battalions, 75th Ranger Regiment, departed Lawson Army Airfield, Fort Benning, Georgia, at 18:00 on 19 December 1989.

By 20:00 the Panamanians suspected an immediate attack from the Americans. At 21:58 the Comandancia ordered all units to report by telephone every thirty minutes. Two hours later, the Comandancia sent out a message, probably to some of the troop commanders: "They’re coming. The ballgame is at 1 AM. Report to your units...draw your weapons and prepare to fight." Another message went out to the Rio Hato military complex at 23:30: "Draw your weapons and get out on the airfield; start shooting when they come over; block the runways."

As such the two companies left their barracks and positioned themselves on the airfield in preparation for the coming assault along with blocking the runway with vehicles. They were in a "high state of readiness".

== The battle ==
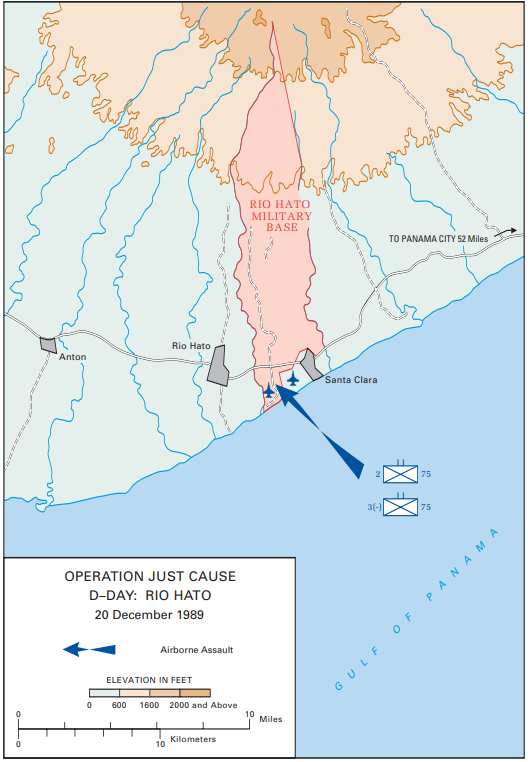
Map of the American battle plan.

At H-hour two F-117A stealth attack aircraft delivered two 2,000-lb. precision bombs in an attempt to stun and confuse the PDF garrison of two heavily armed infantry companies defending the airfield. Instead of landing at their targets both bombs set off nearby waking the garrison. Michael Durant, a helicopter pilot described the opening bombs as “A gigantic flash, followed by a boom … [like] the largest lightning strike you’ve ever seen in your life." This was the first time F-117's were used in combat.

Thirteen C-130 Hercules transport aircraft, having flown nonstop from the United States with troops from the 75th Ranger Regiment, parachuted in the entire 2nd Ranger Battalion (2/75) and one company from the 3rd Ranger Battalion (3/75), with the remainder of 3/75 going to Howard Air Force Base in reserve as a reactionary force. The jump was conducted from a dangerously low altitude of 490 feet (149 m), as intelligence had stated that the PDF anti-aircraft weaponry could not track accurately below 500 feet (152 m). Regardless, 11 of the 13 aircraft were hit by ground fire including 23mm anti-aircraft (AA) fire from at least one ZU-23-2. The combination of a faster than normal air speed of 170 knots (315 km/h; 196 mph) and the low altitude contributed to the several dozen that were injured while landing. Multiple Rangers were also wounded by ground fire coming through the aircraft, with several more wounded while under canopy also from ground fire. At least one Ranger was killed and one paralyzed when their static lines were cut from AA fire. Gathering quickly in the darkness, two companies of Rangers fanned out to isolate the airfield, cut the Pan-American Highway running through it, and seize a nearby ammunition dump.

At least two military trucks filled with PDF soldiers drove down the runway and adjacent dirt road, raking the wounded and the assembling Rangers with small arms and .50 BMG fire. These were dispatched by a Ranger platoon sergeant from 3/75 with a M72 LAW rocket; a non-commissioned officer from A Company, 2/75, fired on a truck with his M1911 pistol and inadvertently hit the gas tank, exploding said vehicle.

At least one PDF armored personnel carrier engaged the Rangers on the west end of the airfield. It was dispatched with simultaneous fire from Rangers firing LAW rockets and from a AC-130H Spectre gunship.

However, in one case of mistaken identity, a US attack helicopter mistook a squad of Rangers for a group of PDF and fired, killing two and wounding four others.

Meanwhile, a Ranger company attacked a nearby NCO academy complex and yet another struck the two PDF companies deployed to defend the airfield. The fighting turned into a ferocious exchange of fire, with the ground fire of the Rangers heavily reinforced by support from an AC-130 Spectre and several attack helicopters.

The contested buildings fell in room-to-room fighting, including grenades and automatic rifles at close ranges. The Battle of Rio Hato Airfield lasted roughly five hours, by which time the Rangers had secured Rio Hato, as well as Manuel Noriega’s lavish beach house nearby.

== Casualties ==
The U.S military lost 4 killed, 18 wounded, and 26 injured in the jump.

The four Rangers killed in the Rio Hato assault were:

- Staff Sgt. Larry R. Barnard of Hallstead, Pennsylvania
- Pfc. Roy Dennis Brown Jr. of Buena Park, California
- Specialist Phillip Scott Lear of Westminster, South Carolina
- Pfc. John Mark Price of Conover, Wisconsin

At Rio Hato, the PDF lost 34 soldiers killed, 362 captured alongside a huge inventory of weapons and abandoned vehicles. A total of 18 V-150 armored vehicles, 1800 assault rifles, 55 machine guns, 11 ZPU-4s, 100,000 rounds of ammunition, and 48 RPG-18 rockets was captured. 43 civilians were also detained by US forces.

Around 200 PDF soldiers managed to flee into the countryside and evade capture.
