= 2nd Ranger Battalion =

2nd Battalion, 75th Ranger Regiment
- 2nd Ranger Battalion shoulder sleeve insignia
- Active: 1943–45, 1974–present
- Country: United States of America
- Branch: United States Army
- Type: Specialized light infantry
- Role: Special operations
- Size: Battalion
- Part of: 75th Ranger Regiment
- Garrison/HQ: Joint Base Lewis–McChord, U.S.
- Nickname: Army Rangers
- Colors: Black and Red
- Engagements: World War II: Operation Overlord; Pointe du Hoc; Omaha Beach; Battle for Brest; Battle of Hurtgen Forest; Operation Urgent Fury; Operation Just Cause; Operation Uphold Democracy; Twenty-first century: War in Afghanistan (2001–2021); Iraq War (U.S. participation 2003-2010); Operation Inherent Resolve

Commanders
- Notable commanders: James Earl Rudder; Wayne A. Downing

Insignia
- Distinctive unit insignia

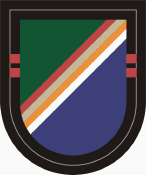
- Unit beret flash

- NATO Map Symbol (1998)

- NATO Map Symbol (2017)

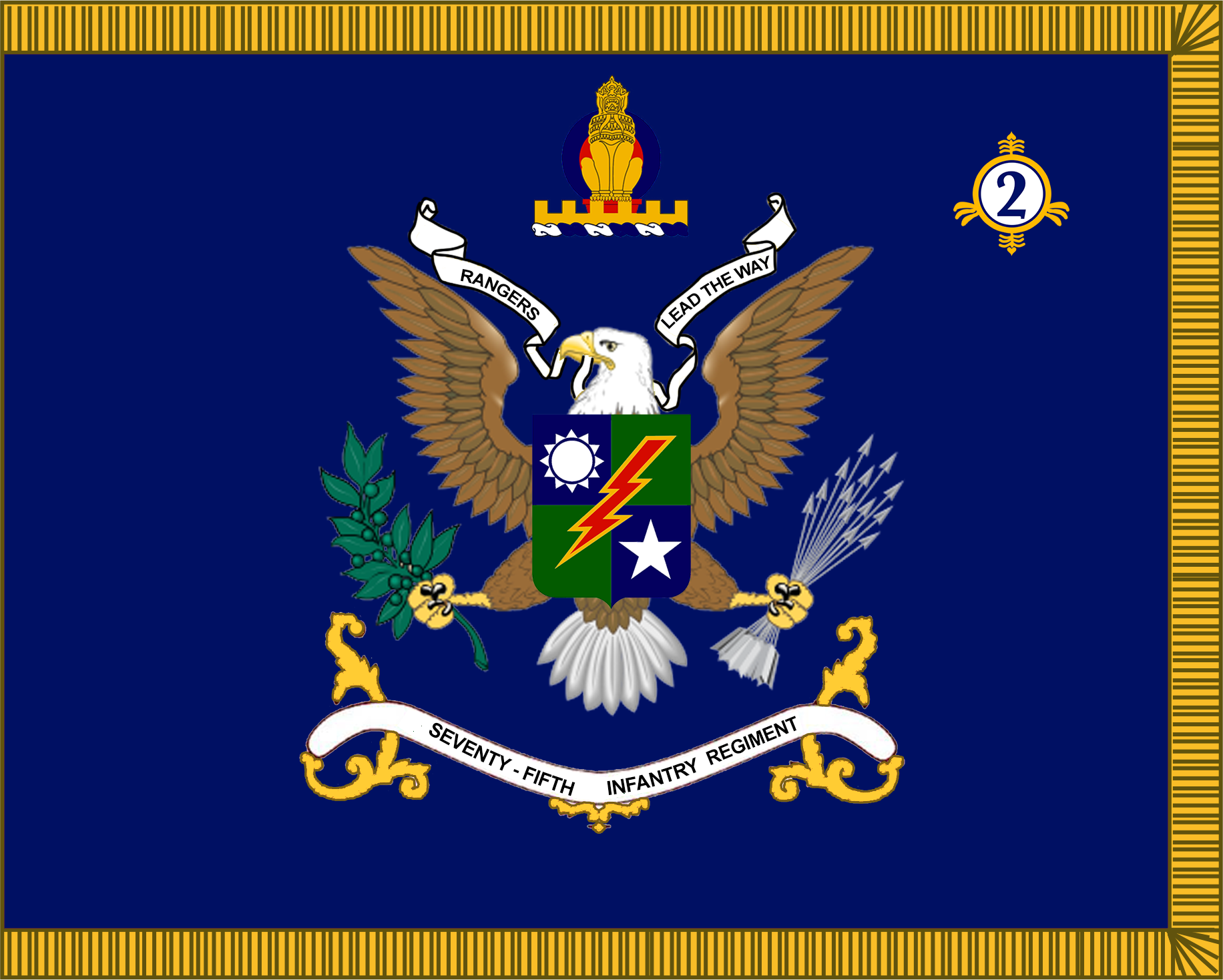
- 75th Ranger Regiment 2nd Battalion Flag

The 2nd Ranger Battalion, based at Joint Base Lewis–McChord south of Seattle, Washington, United States, is one of three battalions belonging to the United States Army's 75th Ranger Regiment.

== History ==
=== World War II ===
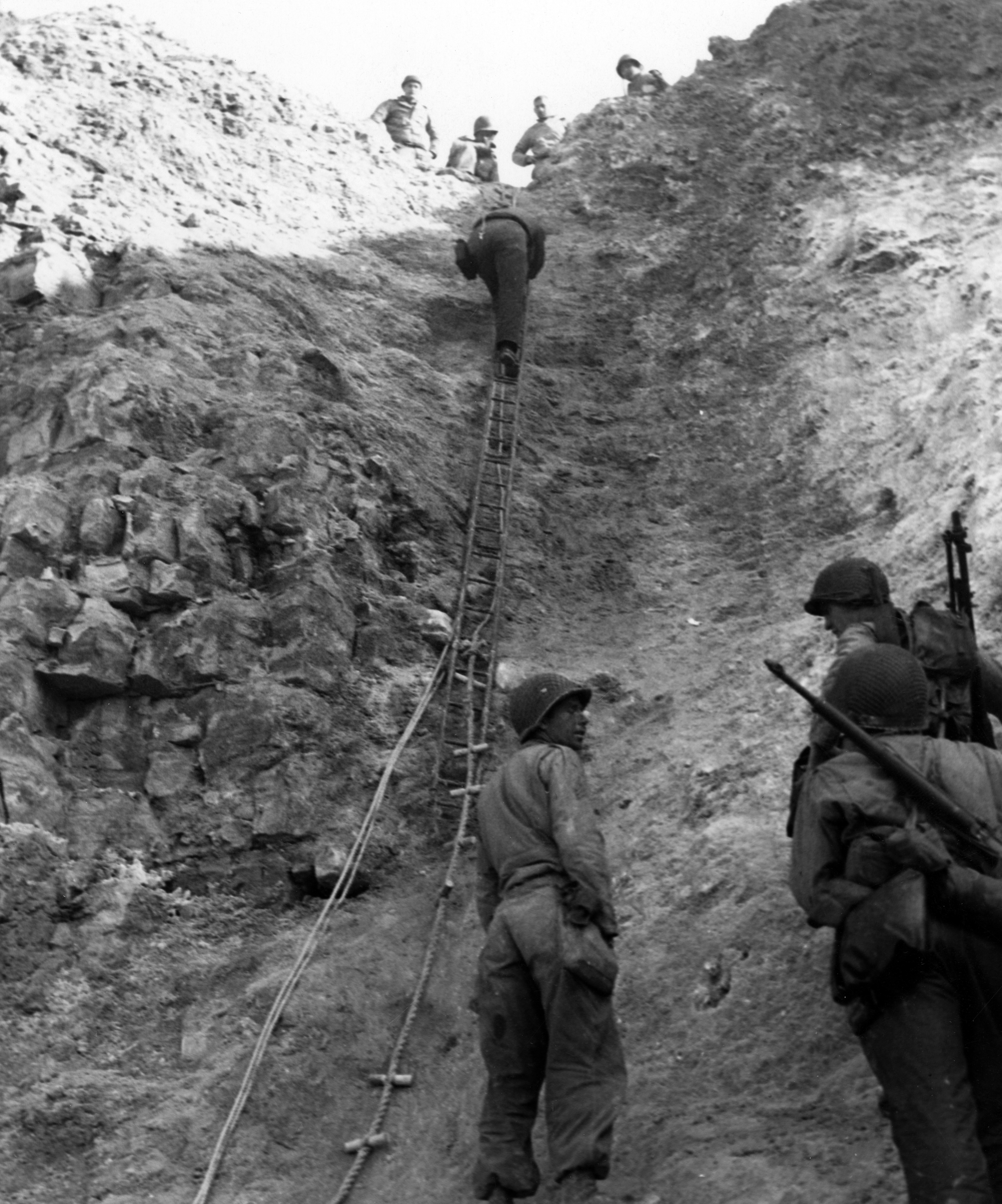
Rangers demonstrating the rope ladders used to assault Pointe du Hoc

==== Formation of Ranger Battalions ====
On 1 April 1943 the 2nd Ranger Battalion was formed at Camp Forrest, Tennessee, along with the 5th Ranger Battalion. Both battalions were officially activated in September 1943 and shipped to Great Britain where they were prepared for Operation Overlord as part of six ranger battalions of the Second World War.

==== Assault at Point du Hoc ====
On 6 June 1944, Dog, Easy, and Fox Companies, commanded by Lieutenant Colonel James Rudder, landed at Pointe du Hoc from LCA landing craft and specially modified DUKW "Ducks" operated by the Royal Navy. The 225 rangers had set off from Britain to launch an assault upon the cliffs overlooking the English Channel. In order to augment the strength of the 2nd Battalion, members of the Provisional Ranger Group were assigned as well. Several landing craft containing rangers and supplies capsized in the stormy waters and many rangers drowned due to heavy equipment, but others were saved and hoisted into other DUKWs to participate in the attack. The rangers had planned to land at the base of the cliffs at 0600 hours, however, because of a navigational error, they landed nearly an hour late. This cost the lives of more rangers as well as the element of surprise. During the attack, the 190 remaining rangers scaled the cliffs utilizing rope ladders, but only 90 rangers were still able to bear arms after two days of relentless fighting. During the assault, 2nd Battalion managed to achieve their primary objective, disabling a battery of 155mm French artillery captured by the Germans. These guns were to be aimed at Utah Beach, however, the rangers prevented their use, saving American lives on the shores of Normandy.

==== Omaha Beach ====
Meanwhile, Able, Baker, and Charlie Companies landed along with the 5th Rangers, the 1st Infantry Division, and the 29th Infantry Division at Omaha Beach. They suffered extremely heavy casualties but were able to complete their D-Day objectives. Able suffered up to 96% casualties with just two men making it off the beaches. The 2nd Rangers were later involved in the Battle for Brest and the Battle of Hürtgen Forest where they led the assault on Hill 400, Bergstein.

==== Deactivation ====
The battalion was deactivated after the war, together with the 5th and 6th Battalion.

==== Reformation of the modern day 2nd Ranger Battalion ====
The modern day 2nd Ranger Battalion also draws heritage from the 5307 Composite Unit, also known as Merrill's Marauders. This unit was consolidated with Company H, 475th Infantry before eventually being deactivated after the end of the war.

=== Post-WWII ===
==== Korean War ====
In 1950, the 2nd Ranger Battalion was redesignated as the 2nd Ranger Infantry Company and activated to serve during the Korean War before being inactivated. Later, in 1960, while still deactivated, it was consolidated with 4th Company, 2d Battalion, 1st Regiment, 1st Special Service Force and eventually was redesignated as Headquarters and Headquarters Company, 10th Special Forces Group.

==== Okinawa ====
In 1954, Company H, 475th Infantry was redesignated as Company H, 75th Infantry Regiment (Ranger) and was reactivated for a short time before being inactivated in Okinawa.

==== Vietnam War ====
During the Vietnam War, Company H, 75th Infantry was reactivated and served as a LRRP unit during the war, becoming the longest serving in LRP/Ranger history and the most decorated. It was deactivated for a short time in 1972. Following the success of the 1st Battalion, 75th Infantry Regiment (Ranger) which was raised in 1974, the 2nd Battalion, 75th Infantry was activated later that year, inheriting its colors and lineage from Company H, 75th Infantry.

==== Reorganization ====
In 1984, the 2nd battalion, 75th Infantry was reorganized and consolidated with Headquarters and Headquarters Company, 10th SFG (which was formerly Company A, 2d Ranger Infantry Battalion), thus inheriting its World War II 2nd Ranger Battalion heritage. It was concurrently redesignated as 2nd Battalion, of the newly formed 75th Ranger Regiment.

==== Grenada ====
The modern ranger battalions are strategic assets, prepared to conduct missions on short-notice worldwide. The 2/75th participated in Operation Urgent Fury in October 1983. During the invasion of Grenada, the 2nd conducted a low-level parachute assault (500 feet), seized the airfield at Point Salines, rescued American citizens at the True Blue Medical Campus, and conducted air assault operations to eliminate pockets of resistance.

==== Panama ====
In December 1989 the battalion took part in Operation Just Cause. The 2nd and 3rd Ranger Battalions and a regimental command and control team, conducted a parachute assault onto the airfield at Rio Hato, to neutralize the Panamanian Defense Force rifle companies and seize General Manuel Noriega's beach house. Following the successful completion of these assaults, Rangers conducted follow-on operations in support of Joint Task Force (JTF)-South. The Rangers captured 1,014 enemy prisoners of war (EPW), and over 18,000 arms of various types. The Rangers sustained 5 killed and 42 wounded.

=== Afghanistan and Iraq ===
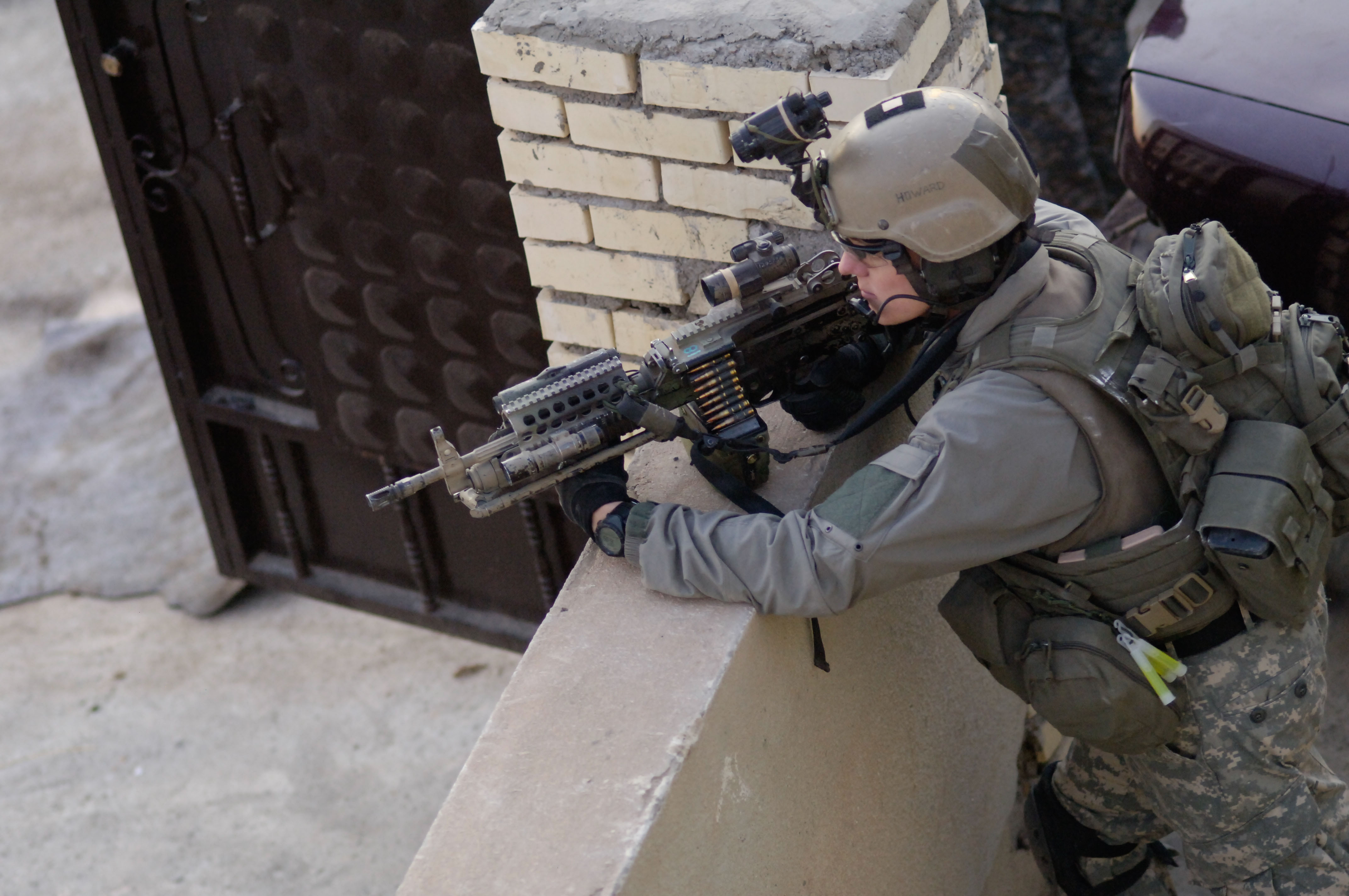
A Ranger from 2nd Ranger Battalion providing overwatch during combat operations in Iraq.

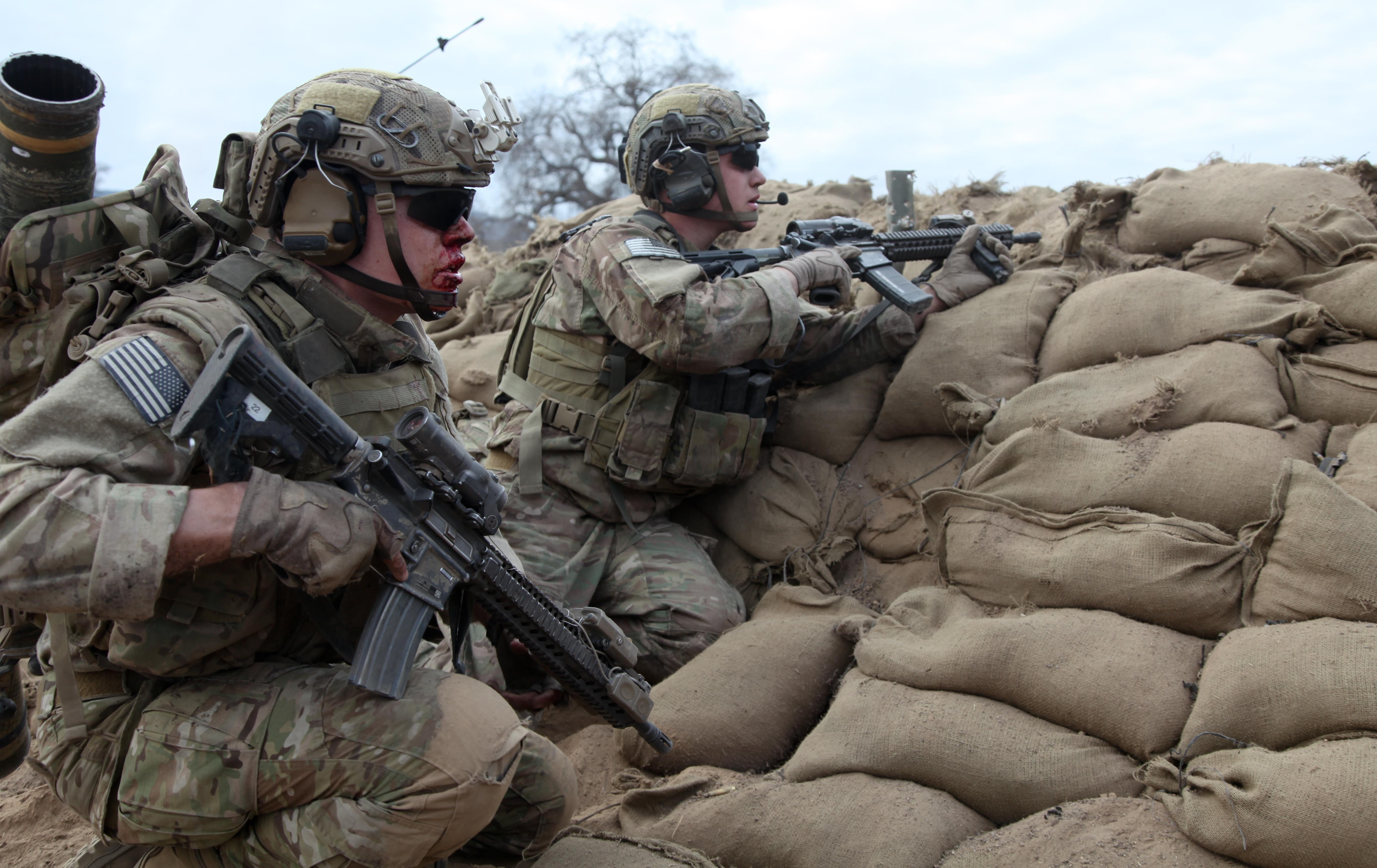
Rangers from Delta Company, 2nd Battalion prepare to provide security and lay down suppressive fire during a live fire exercise at Fort Hunter Liggett, California, Jan. 25, 2014. The Ranger's nosebleed was due to the dry climate and intense training.

==== Beginning of operations in Afghanistan ====
Following the September 11 attacks, the battalion has repeatedly fought in Afghanistan and Iraq. In March 2002, 2nd Battalion deployed to Afghanistan in support of Operation Enduring Freedom and conducted numerous air assaults, raids, patrols, and ambushes against anti-coalition forces. In December 2002, elements of 2nd Battalion again deployed in support of Operation Enduring Freedom, followed in February 2003 by the whole battalion. This period marked the first time in history of the modern ranger regiment that a ranger battalion was required to conduct long-duration and sustained combat operations.

==== Beginning of operations in Iraq ====
The battalion participated in the 2003 invasion of Iraq at the start of the Iraq War. On 26 March 2003, B company supported Navy SEALs from DEVGRU in the Objective Beaver mission. On 1 April 2003, 290 Rangers from 2/75th and 1/75th took part in the successful rescue of PFC Jessica Lynch. 2nd Battalion was also the first American force with boots on the ground in Baghdad so they could establish a base of operations for follow on units and later participated in operations to capture known and wanted terrorists operating within the country. From November to December 2003, the battalion deployed again to Afghanistan and Rangers pursued enemies in the most remote regions of the country. Despite extreme altitudes and bitter cold, the battalion conducted mountain patrols at altitudes upwards of 9,000 feet, mobile patrols through major population centers, and conducted air assaults and direct action raids on heavily defended enemy objectives.

==== Further operations in Iraq and Afghanistan ====
From March to May 2004 and July to October 2004, the battalion deployed to both Iraq and Afghanistan.

==== Death of Zarqawi ====
On 7 June 2006, rangers from 2nd platoon of C company, accompanied Delta Force operators to a farmhouse in the village Hibhib, northeast of Baquba, Iraq, where JSOC had tracked down Abu Musab al-Zarqawi (the leader of AQI). An F-16C airstrike was called in which destroyed the house. US forces recovered the severely wounded Zarqawi who succumbed to his wounds shortly thereafter.

==== Honoring decorated Rangers ====
On May 19, 2017, over 150 rangers from 2nd Battalion were honored with combat decorations for their work during Operation Freedom's Sentinel. They included one ranger who received the Silver Star, five rangers who received the Bronze Star with "V" device, and 5 more who received the Joint Service Commendation Medal with "V" device.

==== Night Raid in Nimruz Operation ====
On 24 November 2018, members of 2nd Battalion conducted a night raid against al-Qaida senior leaders in Kash Rod district, Nimruz province, alongside the obscure Afghan Ktah Khas partner force. During the raid, Army ranger Sgt. Leandro Jasso was killed by friendly fire from a Ktah Khas operator. All Ktah Khas operators denied shooting Jasso. In total, 10 enemy fighters were reported killed that night. The rangers and Afghan troops destroyed a large enemy weapons cache, evacuated their casualties, and extracted back to base.

==== Ranger Casualties ====
As of 4 July 2022, 25 Rangers in (or previously in) 2nd Battalion have been killed during Operation Enduring Freedom (including in Pakistan) and Operation Iraqi Freedom, 20 of them in combat. (Note: Including training-related and other deaths outside of combat)

== Lineage ==
The 2nd Battalion of the 75th Ranger Regiment traces its lineage to two units; Company H, 475th Infantry Regiment (previously known as the 5307th Composite Unit (Provisional), or "Merrill's Marauders") and Company A, 2nd Ranger Battalion. The units originally had separate lineages, but were then consolidated in 1986.

- Constituted 3 October 1943 in the Army of the United States in the China-Burma-India Theater of Operations as an element of the 5307th Composite Unit (Provisional)
- Consolidated 10 August 1944 with Company H, 475th Infantry (constituted 25 May 1944 in the Army of the United States), and consolidated unit designated as Company H, 475th Infantry
- Inactivated 1 July 1945 in China
- Redesignated 21 June 1954 as Company H, 75th Infantry
- Allotted 26 October 1954 to the Regular Army
- Activated 20 November 1954 on Okinawa
- Inactivated 21 March 1956 on Okinawa
- Activated 1 February 1969 in Vietnam
- Inactivated 15 August 1972 in Vietnam
- Redesignated 1 October 1974 as Headquarters and Headquarters Company, 2d Battalion, 75th Infantry, and activated at Fort Lewis, Washington (organic elements concurrently constituted and activated)
- Headquarters and Headquarters Company consolidated 3 February 1986 with former Company A, 2d Infantry Battalion (see ANNEX); 2d Battalion, 75th Infantry, concurrently redesignated as the 2d Battalion, 75th Ranger Regiment

=== Annex ===
- Constituted 11 March 1943 in the Army of the United States as Company A, 2d Ranger Battalion
- Activated 1 April 1943 at Camp Forrest, Tennessee
- Redesignated 1 August 1943 as Company A, 2d Ranger Infantry Battalion
- Inactivated 23 October 1945 at Camp Patrick Henry, Virginia
- Redesignated 29 July 1949 as Company A, 2d Infantry Battalion
- Activated 15 September 1949 in the Panama Canal Zone
- Inactivated 4 January 1950 in the Panama Canal Zone
- Redesignated 25 October 1950 as the 2d Ranger Infantry Company and allotted to the Regular Army
- Activated 28 October 1950 at Fort Benning, Georgia
- Inactivated 1 August 1951 in Korea
- Redesignated 24 November 1952 as Company A, 2d Ranger Infantry Battalion
- Activated 1 July 1955 in Iceland
- Inactivated 11 March 1960 at Fort Hamilton, New York
- Consolidated 15 April 1960 with the 4th Company, 2d Battalion, 1st Regiment, 1st Special Service Force (activated 9 July 1942), and consolidated unit was redesignated as Headquarters and Headquarters Company, 10th Special Forces Group, 1st Special Forces
- Consolidated 30 September 1960 with Headquarters and Headquarters Company, 10th Special Forces Group (activated 11 June 1952), and consolidated unit designated as Headquarters and Headquarters Company, 10th Special Forces Group, 1st Special Forces (organic elements concurrently constituted and activated 20 March 1961)
- Former Company A, 2d Infantry Battalion, withdrawn 3 February 1986, consolidated with Headquarters and Headquarters Company, 2d Battalion, 75th Infantry, and consolidated unit redesignated as Headquarters and Headquarters Company, 2d Battalion 75th Ranger Regiment (remainder of 10th Special Forces Group, 1st Special Forces—hereafter separate lineage)

== Unit awards and streamers ==
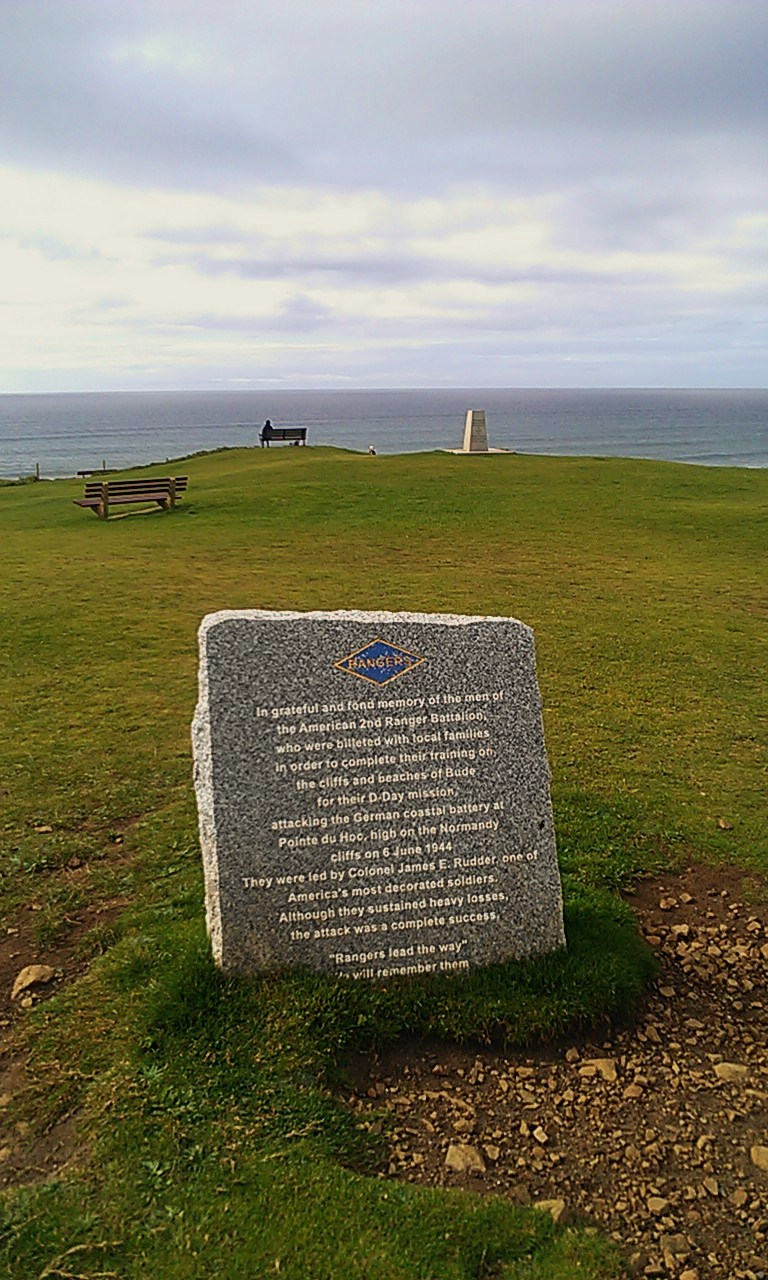
Memorial erected by the Battalion to mark their time spent in Bude, Cornwall during the Second World War

The 2nd Battalion has earned numerous unit awards and battle streamers. Among them are:

- Presidential Unit Citation (Army), Streamer embroidered EL GUETTAR
- Presidential Unit Citation (Army), Streamer embroidered SALERNO
- Presidential Unit Citation (Army), Streamer embroidered POINTE DU HOC
- Presidential Unit Citation (Army), Streamer embroidered NORMANDY BEACHHEAD
- Presidential Unit Citation (Army), Streamer embroidered SAAR RIVER AREA
- Presidential Unit Citation (Army), Streamer embroidered MYITKYINA
- Presidential Unit Citation (Army), Streamer embroidered VIETNAM 1966–68
- Valorous Unit Award, Streamer embroidered VIETNAM – II CORPS AREA
- Valorous Unit Award, Streamer embroidered VIETNAM – BINH DUONG PROVINCE
- Valorous Unit Award, Streamer embroidered VIETNAM – CAMBODIA FISH HOOK 1970
- Valorous Unit Award, Streamer embroidered VIETNAM – III CORPS AREA 1969
- Valorous Unit Award, Streamer embroidered VIETNAM – III CORPS AREA 1971
- Valorous Unit Award, Streamer embroidered VIETNAM – THUA THIEN-QUANG TRI PROVINCES 1968
- Valorous Unit Award, Streamer embroidered GRENADA 1983
- Meritorious Unit Commendation (Army), Streamer embroidered VIETNAM 1968
- Meritorious Unit Commendation (Army), Streamer embroidered VIETNAM 1969
- Meritorious Unit Commendation (Army), Streamer embroidered VIETNAM 1969–70
- Meritorious Unit Commendation (Army), Streamer embroidered PACIFIC AREA
- Joint Meritorious Unit Award, Stream embroidered PANAMA 1989
- Valorous Unit Award, IRAQ
- Valorous Unit Award, AFGHANISTAN

== Notable 2nd Battalion personnel ==
- General Austin S. Miller, current commander of Resolute Support Mission. Former platoon leader in A Company, 2nd Battalion, 75th Ranger Regiment. Miller also served with Delta Force.
- First Lieutenant John P. Abizaid served as a platoon leader 1975–1976 in Alpha Company and later as the XO of Charlie Company from 1976 to 1977. He went on to command CENTCOM during the second Gulf War. His change in intelligence methods led to the capture of Saddam Hussein. He retired as a general.
- Lieutenant General David Barno, commanded 2nd Ranger Battalion from 1993 to 1994. Later became commander, Military Operations-Afghanistan.
- Brigadier General James Emory Mace, recipient of Distinguished Service Cross (Vietnam), 2nd Ranger Battalion commander and the first commander of the Ranger Training Brigade; 15th Annual Ranger Hall of Fame inductee 2007.
- Lieutenant Colonel Wayne A. Downing was the third commander of the 2nd Ranger Battalion, and eventually commanded the 75th Ranger Regiment, and Special Operations Command. He retired as a general.
- Captain Gerald Heaney, World War II, landed at Normandy on the early hours of D-Day, Heaney was one of only three still on the front lines with the Rangers on VE Day. He served for nearly 40 years as a federal judge on the United States Court of Appeals for the Eighth Circuit.
- Captain Robert L. Howard was nominated for the Medal of Honor three times for his actions in Vietnam, receiving it once. Howard commanded Alpha Company from approximately 1975–1977. Howard was later inducted into the Ranger Hall of Fame.
- Second Lieutenant Leonard Lomell, served as platoon leader during the D-Day landings. He was awarded the Distinguished Service Cross for his actions.
- Sergeant First Class Leroy Petry, Medal of Honor recipient in the War in Afghanistan
- Colonel James Earl Rudder, commander of the 2nd Ranger Battalion during World War II, later major general USAR and president of Texas A&M University, led the ranger assault on Pointe du Hoc on D-Day.
- Sergeant First Class Randy Shughart, posthumous Medal of Honor recipient; a sniper with Delta Force who was killed during the Battle of Mogadishu.
- Corporal Pat Tillman, an American football player who left his NFL career and enlisted in the United States Army in May 2002 and was killed on 22 April 2004.
- Sergeant Stephen Trujillo, awarded the Silver Star during Operation Urgent Fury, the first Silver Star awarded since Vietnam, for rescuing fellow rangers from a downed aircraft while under direct enemy fire.
- General Stanley McChrystal, commanded 2nd Ranger Battalion from 1994 to 1996, later went on to command US and ISAF forces in Afghanistan.
- SFC Jason Everman, musician best known for playing in grunge bands Nirvana and Soundgarden before enlisting in 1994.
- Sergeant Mat Best, vice president of Black Rifle Coffee Company.
- Sergeant Kris Paronto, CIA Global Response Staff security contractor during the 2012 attack on the U.S. diplomatic outpost in Benghazi, Libya, former member of B Company, 2nd Ranger Battalion.
- Sergeant First Class Vincent “Rocco” Vargas, actor, writer, and producer.
- Master Sergeant Joshua Wheeler, Delta Force operator and Silver Star recipient, formerly with 2nd Battalion. He was the first American service member killed in action as a result of enemy fire while fighting ISIS militants and the first American to be killed in action in Iraq since November 2011.
- Sergeant John Whitley, acting US Secretary of the Army.
- Specialist Luke Elliott Sommer, bank robber.
- Staff Sergeant Sean Keough, two time recipient of the Purple Heart and the Silver Star for his actions in combat during the global war on terrorism.
- Sergeant Peter Cimpoes, awarded the Silver Star for his actions in combat during the global war on terrorism.
- Specialist Ricardo Cerros, awarded the Purple Heart and Silver Star for his actions in combat during the global war on terrorism. SPC Cerros was killed in action on October 8, 2011.
- Specialist Joe Gibson, awarded the Silver Star for his actions in combat during the global war on terrorism.

== See also ==
- H Company, 75th Infantry (Ranger) – 2nd Battalion's lineage
