= 914th Grenadier Regiment (Wehrmacht) =

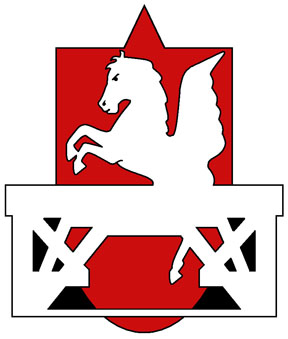
- Unit insignia
- Active: November 1943 – 8 May 1945
- Country: Nazi Germany
- Branch: Army
- Type: Infantry
- Size: Regiment
- Engagements: World War II: D-Day; Battle of the Bulge

The 914th Grenadier Regiment was a regiment of the Wehrmacht in the Second World War. It formed part of the 352nd Infantry Division, and fought in the Battle of Normandy and the Battle of the Bulge.
