= OMG... We're in a Horror Movie!!! =

- Directed by: Ajala Bandele
- Written by: Ajala Bandele; Tom Hatfield
- Produced by: Ajala Bandele; Tom Hatfield; Brittany Woodford
- Starring: Brendan McGowan; Sharon Mae Wang; Nils Jansson; Chris Hampton; Ajala Bandele; Shanna Malcolm; Liz Fenning
- Cinematography: Greg Loebell
- Edited by: Ajala Bandele
- Music by: Tyler David Gilbert
- Production company: Alchemical Brothers
- Distributed by: Leomark Studios
- Release date: February 21, 2015 (HRIFF)
- Running time: 107 minutes
- Country: United States
- Language: English

OMG... We're in a Horror Movie!!! is a 2015 American comedy horror film directed by Ajala Bandele. It stars Brendan McGowan, Sharon Mae Wang, Nils Jansson, Chris Hampton, Bandele, Shanna Malcolm, and Liz Fenning as friends who realize they have suddenly been transported into a horror film. It premiered at the Hollywood Reel Independent Film Festival in February 2015 and was released on video-on-demand in January 2016.

== Plot ==
While playing a board game, several friends find themselves transported into a horror movie. They are forced to assume the roles of stereotypical horror film characters, including one who must become the killer.

== Cast ==
- Brendan McGowan as Tom
- Sharon Mae Wang as Jesse
- Nils Jansson as Kyle
- Chris Hampton as Chris
- Ajala Bandele as AJ
- Shanna Malcolm as Tanya
- Liz Fenning as Amy

== Production ==
Director and co-writer Ajala Bendele said that writing the story came first, and the jokes flowed from that. Bendele was inspired by Scream, Scary Movie, The Cabin in the Woods, and The Truman Show. He wrote the part of AJ for himself after experiencing frustration with his acting career. The other parts were similarly written for his friends.

== Release ==
OMG... We're in a Horror Movie!!! premiered at the Hollywood Reel Independent Film Festival on February 21, 2015. Leomark Studios released it on video-on-demand in January 2016.

== Reception ==
Matt Boiselle of Dread Central rated it 3/5 stars and called the film "fairly entertaining", though he said the humor may be offensive to some viewers. Joel Harley of Starburst rated it 3/10 stars and wrote that despite the cast and crew's obvious enthusiasm for the film, it is too inept and unfunny to enjoy. Mark L. Miller of Ain't It Cool News positively compared it to the Scary Movie film series and called it a "clever and fun" film that suffers from poor pacing.
