= Thomas M. Hatfield =

American historian

Thomas Marvin Hatfield
- Born: San Antonio, Texas, U.S.
- Education: The University of Texas at Austin
- Occupation: historian

Thomas M. Hatfield is an American historian. He is a senior research fellow at the Dolph Briscoe Center for American History at the University of Texas at Austin, and director of its Military History Institute. He was previously dean of continuing education at the university, from 1977 to 2007. He contributed to the establishment of both the John Tyler Community College in Richmond, Virginia and the Austin Community College in Austin, Texas, and was among the founders of the Normandy Scholars Program at the University of Texas at Austin.

== Books ==
- Rudder - From Leader to Legend. College Station: Texas A & M University Press, 2011
