= Vierville =

Vierville may refer to the following communes in France:

- Vierville-sur-Mer, location of Omaha Beach, a 1944 D-Day landing spot, in Normandy
- Vierville, Manche, also in Normandy
- Vierville, Eure-et-Loir

== See also ==
- Verville (disambiguation)
