= List of ships in Omaha Bombardment Group =

Ships supporting the 1944 Normandy landings

The Omaha bombardment group were warships tasked to provide naval gunfire support against the defences of Omaha Beach as part of the Normandy landings on June 6, 1944, the opening day of Operation Overlord, the Allied invasion of German-occupied Western Europe during World War II. They were commanded by Rear Admiral Carleton F. Bryant USN under Rear Admiral Alan G. Kirk, the commander of the Western Naval Task Force.

Omaha Bombardment Group
Name	Type	National service
Arkansas	Battleship	US Navy
Texas	Battleship	US Navy
Bellona (Note: Badsey & Bean includes HMS Bellona as part of Task Force O, but does include it in the list of ships in the bombardment group.)	Light cruiser	Royal Navy
Glasgow	Light cruiser	Royal Navy
Georges Leygues	Light cruiser	Free French Navy
Montcalm	Light cruiser	Free French Navy
Baldwin	Destroyer	US Navy
Barton (Note: Tillman does not list USS Barton as part of the bombardment group.)	Destroyer	US Navy
Carmick	Destroyer	US Navy
Doyle	Destroyer	US Navy
Emmons	Destroyer	US Navy
Frankford	Destroyer	US Navy
Harding	Destroyer	US Navy
McCook	Destroyer	US Navy
Satterlee	Destroyer	US Navy
Thompson	Destroyer	US Navy
Melbreak	Escort destroyer	Royal Navy
Talybont	Escort destroyer	Royal Navy
Tanatside	Escort destroyer	Royal Navy
