= Verville =

Verville is a French and French Canadian surname which could mean:

1. towards the town, from the French words vers, meaning "towards", and ville, meaning "town"; or
2. green town, from the French vert, meaning "green", and ville, meaning "town".

It can also be a variant of Vervelle, which is derived from a word that means "metal keeper" or "ring through which a bolt is secured".

Verville (Merry Point, Virginia) is listed on the National Register of Historic Places in Lancaster County, Virginia

The surname may refer to:

- Alfred V. Verville (1890–1970), an American aviation pioneer
- Alphonse Verville (1864–1921), a Canadian politician and trade unionist
- Elizabeth Verville, an American diplomat for the U.S. State Department
- François Béroalde de Verville (Paris, 1556–1626), a French Renaissance novelist, poet and intellectual
- Joseph-Achille Verville (1887–1937), a Canadian politician and Liberal Party member of the Canadian House of Commons
- Kevin Verville, American politician from New Hampshire
- Monique Roy Verville (1961–), a politician from Quebec, Canada

== See also ==
- Vierville (disambiguation)
- Green City (disambiguation)
