= Shahrisabz (disambiguation) =

Shakhrisabz (Uzbek: Шаҳрисабз Shahrisabz; Tajik: Шаҳрисабз; Persian: شهر سبز shahr-i sabz (city of green / verdant city); Russian: Шахрисабз), is a city in Qashqadaryo Region in southern Uzbekistan

Shakhrisabz or Shakhrisabz may also refer to:

- Shakhrisabz District, Uzbekistan
- Shakhrisabz Suzani, a type of Uzbek textile

== See also ==
- Green City (disambiguation)
