= Omaha Beach =

WWII amphibious landing zone in France

- Part of the Normandy landings, World War II
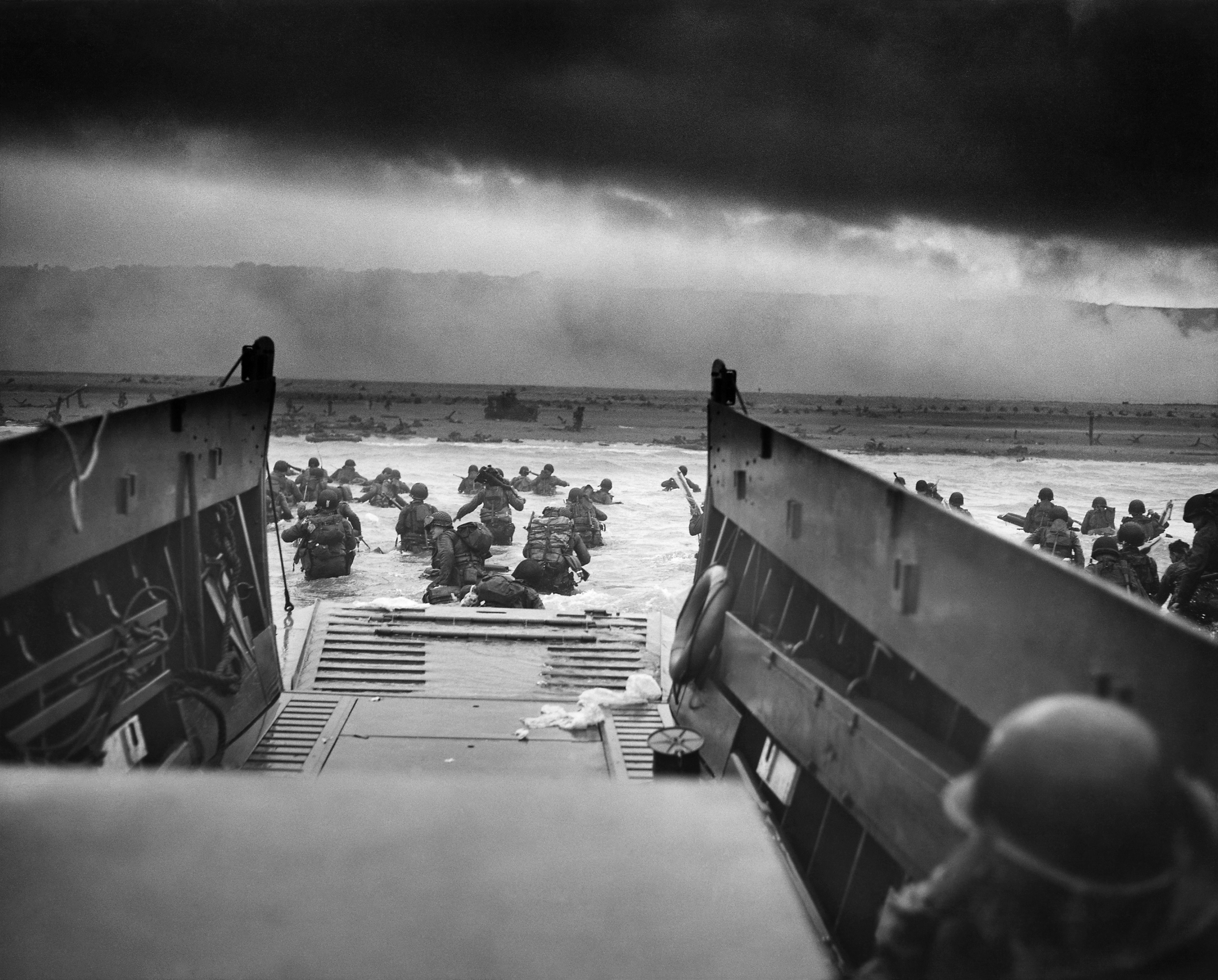
- Into the Jaws of Death: Troops from the U.S. 1st Infantry Division landing on Omaha, as photographed by Robert F. Sargent
Date	6 June, 1944
Location	Sainte-Honorine-des-Pertes, Saint-Laurent-sur-Mer, Vierville-sur-Mer, in France 49°22′08″N 0°52′07″W
Result	Allied victory

Belligerents
United States; United Kingdom; Canada; France	Germany

Commanders and leaders
Leonard T. Gerow; John L. Hall Jr.; Clarence R. Huebner; Charles H. Gerhardt; Norman Cota	Dietrich Kraiss

Units involved
V Corps: 1st Infantry Division; 29th Infantry Division; US Army Rangers; (United States) US Navy; (United States) US Coast Guard; (United Kingdom) Commandos; (United Kingdom) Royal Navy; (United Kingdom) Royal Air Force; (Canada) Royal Canadian Navy; (Free France) Free French Navy	(Nazi Germany) LXXXIV Corps: 352nd Infantry Division; 439th Ost-Battalion; 716th Infantry Division

Strength
43,250 infantry 2 battleships 3 cruisers 13 destroyers 1,010 other vessels	7,800 infantry 8 artillery bunkers 35 pillboxes 4 artillery pieces 6 mortar pits 18 anti-tank guns 45 rocket launcher sites 85 machine gun sites 6 tank turrets

Casualties and losses
2,000–5,000+	1,200

Omaha Beach was one of five Allied beach landing sectors of the amphibious assault component of Operation Overlord during the Second World War.

On June 6, 1944, the Allies invaded German-occupied France with the Normandy landings. "Omaha" refers to an 8-kilometer (5 mi) section of the coast of Normandy, France, facing the English Channel, from west of Sainte-Honorine-des-Pertes to east of Vierville-sur-Mer on the right bank of the Douve river estuary. Landings here were necessary to link the British landings to the east at Gold with the American landing to the west at Utah, thus providing a continuous lodgement on the Normandy coast of the Baie de Seine (Bay of the Seine River). Taking Omaha was to be the responsibility of United States Army troops, with sea transport, and a naval bombardment force provided predominantly by the United States Navy and Coast Guard, with contributions from the British, Canadian and Free French navies.

The primary objective at Omaha was to secure a beachhead 8 kilometers (5 miles) deep, between Port-en-Bessin and the Vire river, linking with the British landings at Gold to the east, and reaching the area of Isigny to the west to link up with VII Corps landing at Utah. The untested American 29th Infantry Division, along with nine companies of U.S. Army Rangers redirected from Pointe du Hoc, assaulted the western half of the beach. The battle-hardened 1st Infantry Division was given the eastern half.

Opposing the landings was the German 352nd Infantry Division. Of its 12,020 men, 6,800 were experienced combat troops, detailed to defend a 53-kilometer (33 mi) front. The German strategy was based on defeating any seaborne assault at the water line, and the defenses were mainly deployed in strongpoints along the coast.

The Allied plan called for initial assault waves of tanks, infantry, and combat engineer forces to reduce the coastal defenses, allowing larger ships to land in follow-up waves. But very little went as planned. Difficulties in navigation caused most of the landing craft to miss their targets throughout the day. The defenses were unexpectedly strong, and inflicted substantial casualties on landing U.S. troops. Under intense fire, the engineers struggled to clear the beach obstacles; later landings bunched up around the few channels that were cleared. Weakened by the casualties taken just in landing, the surviving assault troops could not clear the exits off the beach. This caused further problems and consequent delays for later landings. Small penetrations were eventually achieved by groups of survivors making improvised assaults, scaling the bluffs between the most well-defended points. By the end of the day, two small isolated footholds had been won by the American forces, which were subsequently exploited against weaker defenses further inland, achieving the original D-Day objectives over the following days. American forces suffered 2,400 casualties at Omaha on June 6, but by the end of the day they had landed 34,000 troops. The German 352nd Division lost 10 percent of its strength, with 1,200 casualties, but it had no reserves coming to continue the fight.

== Terrain and defenses ==
Diagrammatic cross section of the beach at Omaha (not to scale)

The coastline of Normandy was divided into sixteen sectors, which were assigned code names using a spelling-alphabet – from Able, west of Omaha, to Roger on the east flank of Sword. The area of beach that would become Omaha was originally designated X-Ray, from the phonetic alphabet of the day; the name was changed on 3 March 1944. The names of both Omaha and Utah were probably suggested by Omar Bradley, as two privates fitting out his London headquarters were from Omaha, Nebraska (Gayle Eyler) and Provo, Utah; they were not named after the corps commanders, who were from Virginia (Gerow) and Louisiana (Collins). Eight further sectors were added when the invasion was extended to include Utah on the Cotentin Peninsula. Sectors were divided into beaches identified by the colors Red, White and Green, corresponding to the colored lights used on naval craft to designate the port (left), amidships, and starboard (right) sides.

Omaha was bounded at either end by large rocky cliffs. The crescent-shaped beach presented a gently sloping tidal area averaging 300 m (330 yd) between low and high-water marks. Above the tide line was a bank of shingle 2.5 m (8 ft) high and up to 15 m (49 ft) wide in places. At the western end, the shingle bank rested against a stone (further east becoming wood) sea wall which ranged from 1.5–4 m (5–13 ft) in height. For the remaining two thirds of the beach after the seawall ended, the shingle lay against a low sand embankment. Behind the sand embankment and sea wall was a level shelf of sand, narrow at either end and extending up to 200 m (220 yd) inland in the center, and behind that rose steep escarpments or bluffs 30–50 m (33–55 yd) high, which dominated the whole beach and were cut into by small wooded valleys or draws at five points along the beach, codenamed west to east D-1, D-3, E-1, E-3 and F-1.

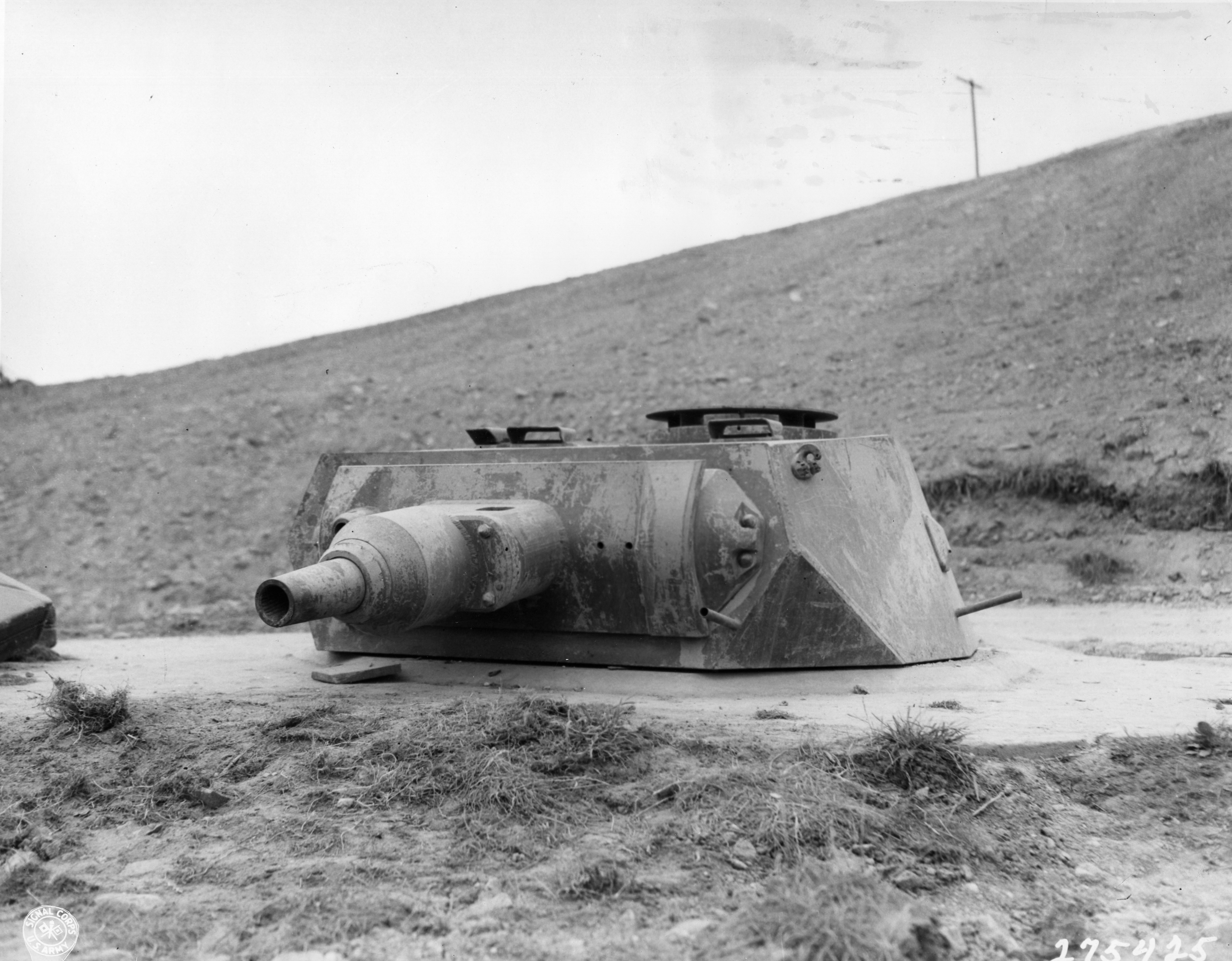
One of six tank turrets reused from the VK 30.01 (H) heavy tank project mounted on a Tobruk at Widerstandsnest 68, photographed in September 1944

The German defensive preparations and the lack of any defense in depth indicated that their plan was to stop the invasion at the beaches. Four lines of obstacles were constructed in the intertidal zone. The first, a non-contiguous line with a small gap in the middle of Dog White and a larger gap across the whole of Easy Red, was 250 m (270 yd) out from the highwater line and consisted of 200 Belgian Gates with mines lashed to the uprights. 30 meters (33 yd) behind these was a continuous line of logs driven into the sand pointing seaward, every third one capped with an anti-tank mine. Another 30 meters (33 yd) shoreward of this line was a continuous line of 450 ramps sloping towards the shore, also with mines attached and designed to force flat-bottomed landing craft to ride up and either flip or detonate the mine. The final line of obstacles was a continuous line of hedgehogs 150 meters (160 yd) from the shoreline. The area between the shingle bank and the bluffs was both wired and mined, and mines were also scattered on the bluff slopes.

Coastal troop deployments, comprising five companies of infantry, were concentrated mostly at 15 strongpoints called Widerstandsnester ("resistance nests"), numbered WN-60 in the east to WN-74 near Vierville in the west, located primarily around the entrances to the draws and protected by minefields and wire. Positions within each strongpoint were interconnected by trenches and tunnels. As well as the basic weaponry of rifles and machine guns, more than 60 light artillery pieces were deployed at these strongpoints. The heaviest pieces were located in eight gun casemates and four open positions while the lighter guns were housed in 35 pillboxes. Obsolete VK 30.01 (H) tank turrets (from a panzer development program) armed with 75 mm L/24 guns were re-used in permanent fortified bunkers. A further 18 anti-tank guns completed the disposition of artillery targeting the beach. Areas between the strongpoints were lightly manned with occasional trenches, rifle pits, and 85 machine-gun emplacements. No area of the beach was left uncovered, and the disposition of weapons meant that flanking fire could be brought to bear anywhere along the beach.

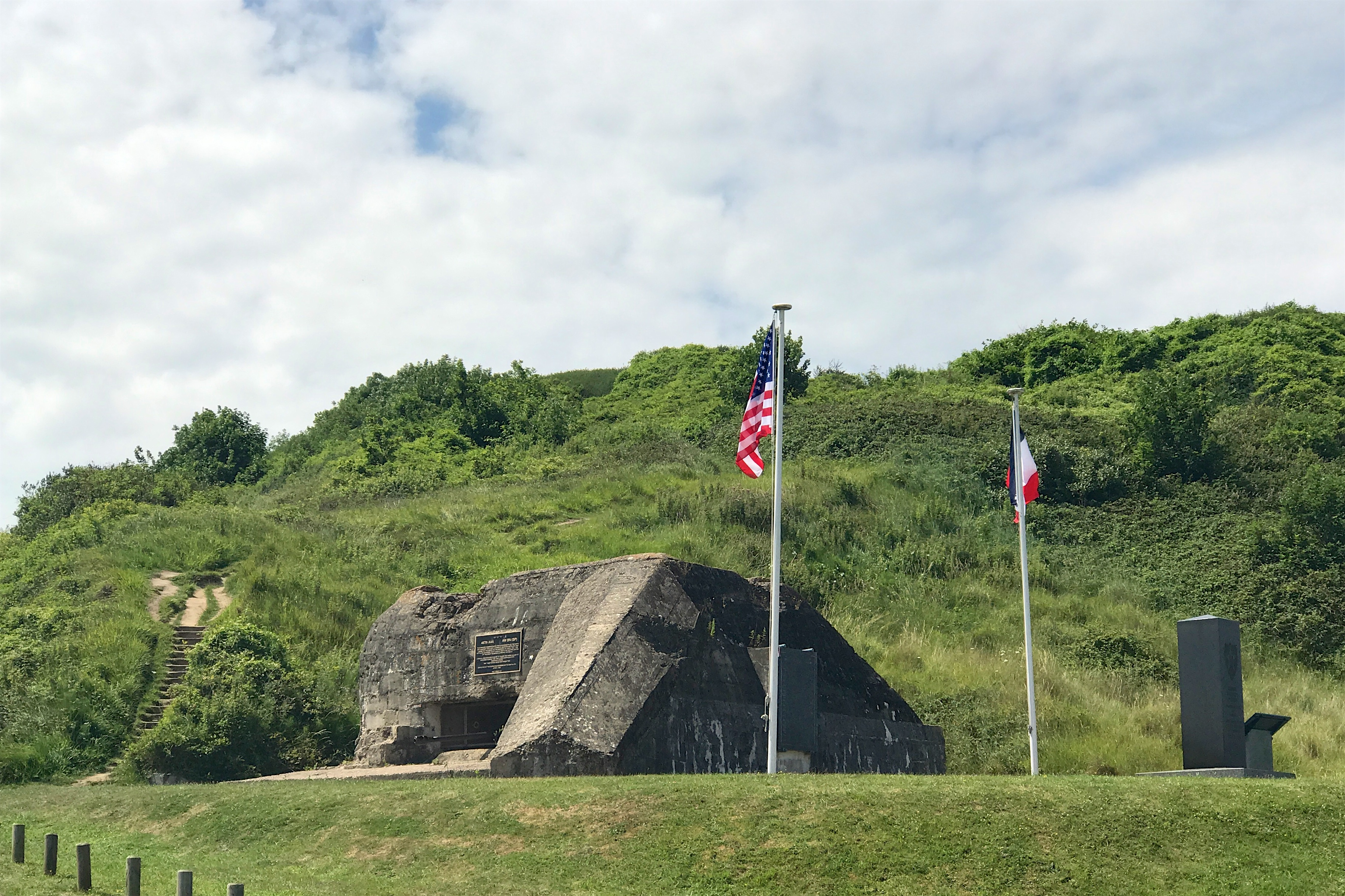
Widerstandsnest 65 defending the E-1 draw at Omaha Beach

Allied intelligence had identified the coastal defenders as a reinforced battalion (800–1000 men) of the 716th Infantry Division. This was a static defensive division estimated to consist up to 50% of non-German troops, mostly Russians and Ukrainians, and German Volksdeutsche. The recently activated but capable 352nd Infantry Division was believed to be 30 kilometers (19 mi) inland at Saint-Lô and was regarded as the most likely force to be committed to a counter-attack. As part of Rommel's strategy to concentrate defenses at the water's edge, the 352nd had been ordered forward in March, taking over responsibility for the defense of the portion of the Normandy coast in which Omaha was located. As part of this reorganization, the 352nd also took under its command two battalions of the 726th Grenadier Regiment (part of the 716th Static Infantry Division) as well as the 439th Ost-Battalion, which had been attached to the 726th. Omaha fell mostly within 'Coast Defense Sector 2', which stretched westward from Colleville and allocated to the 916th Grenadier Regiment, with the third battalion 726th Grenadier Regiment attached. Two companies of the 726th manned strongpoints in the Vierville area while two companies of the 916th occupied the St. Laurent area strongpoints in the center of Omaha. These positions were supported by the artillery of the first and fourth battalions of the 352nd Artillery Regiment (twelve 105 mm and four 150 mm howitzers respectively). The two remaining companies of the 916th formed a reserve at Formigny, three kilometers (1.9 miles) inland. East of Colleville, 'Coast Defense Sector 3' was the responsibility of the remainder of the 726th Grenadier Regiment. Two companies were deployed at the coast, one in the most easterly series of strongpoints, with artillery support provided by the third battalion of the 352nd Artillery Regiment. The area reserve, comprising the two battalions of the 915th Grenadier Regiment and known as 'Kampfgruppe Meyer', was located south-east of Bayeux outside the immediate Omaha area.

The failure to identify the reorganization of the defenses was a rare intelligence breakdown for the Allies. Post-action reports still documented the original estimate and assumed that the 352nd had been deployed to the coastal defenses by chance, a few days previously, as part of an anti-invasion exercise. The source of this inaccurate information came from German prisoners of war from the 352nd Infantry Division captured on D-Day as reported by the 16th Infantry S-3 D-Day Action Report. In fact, Allied intelligence had already become aware of the relocation of the 352nd Infantry Division on June 4. This information was passed on to V Infantry Corps and 1st Infantry Division HQ through 1st Army, but at that late stage in the operations, no plans were changed.

When General Omar Bradley expressed concern about Omaha Beach in January, a Royal Engineers team of Captain Logan Scott-Bowden and Sergeant Bruce Ogden-Smith showed him a sample of sand from the beach. They had swum ashore in Normandy from midget submarines over thirty times, to obtain sand samples to see whether the beaches would support tanks. Scott-Bowden said to him "Sir, I hope you don't mind me saying it, but this beach is a very formidable proposition indeed and there are bound to be tremendous casualties." Bradley put his hand on Scott-Bowden's shoulder and replied, "I know, my boy. I know."

== Plan ==
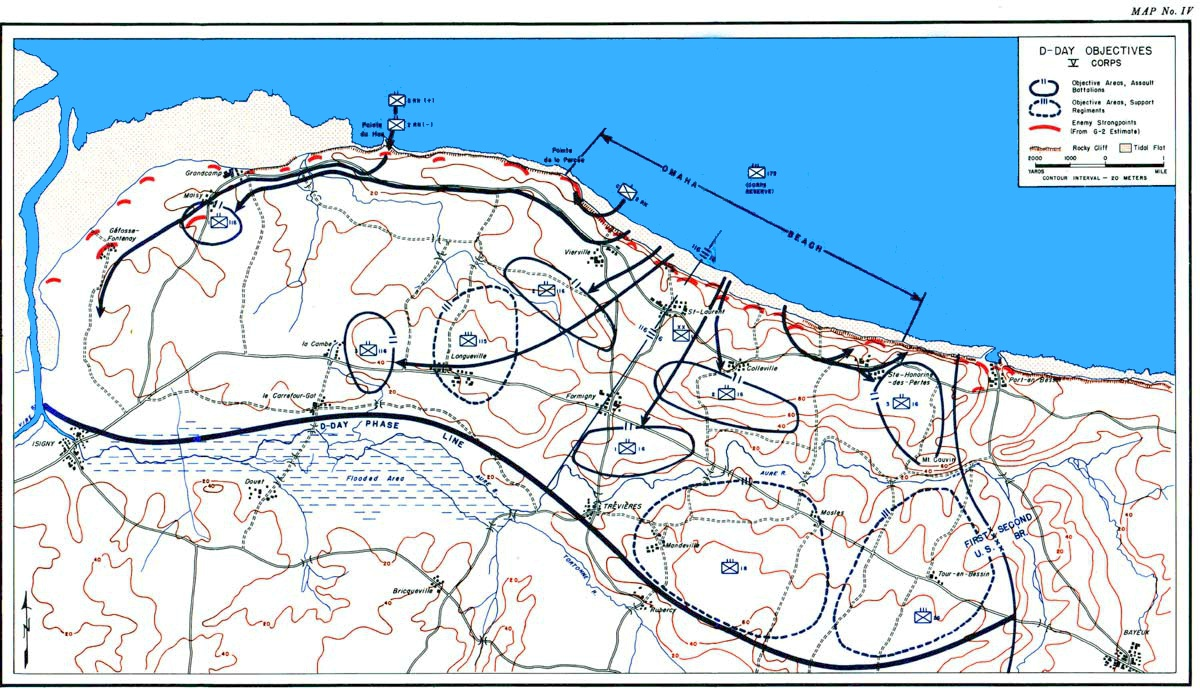
Official history map showing the V Corps objectives for D-Day

Omaha was divided into ten sectors, codenamed (from west to east): Charlie, Dog Green, Dog White, Dog Red, Easy Green, Easy White, Easy Red, Fox Green, Fox White, and Fox Red. The initial assault was to be made by two Regimental Combat Teams (RCT), supported by two tank battalions, with two battalions of Rangers also attached. The infantry regiments were organized into three battalions each of around 1,000 men. Each battalion was organized as three rifle companies each of up to 240 men, and a support company of up to 190 men. Infantry companies A through D belonged to the 1st battalion of a regiment, E through H to the 2nd, I through M to the 3rd; the letter ‘J’ was not used. (Individual companies will be referred to in this article by company and regiment, e.g. Company A of the 116th RCT will be 'A/116'). In addition, each battalion had a headquarters company of up to 180 men. The tank battalions consisted of three companies, A through C, each of 16 tanks, while the Ranger battalions were organized into six companies, A through F, of around 65 men per company. V Corps' 56th Signal Battalion was responsible for communications on Omaha with the fleet offshore, especially routing requests for naval gunfire support to the destroyers and USS Arkansas.

The 116th RCT of the 29th Infantry Division was to land two battalions in the western four beaches, to be followed 30 minutes later by the third battalion. Their landings were to be supported by the tanks of the 743rd Tank Battalion; two companies swimming ashore in amphibious DD tanks and the remaining company landing directly onto the beach from assault craft. To the left of the 116th RCT the 16th RCT of the 1st Infantry Division was also to land two battalions with the third following 30 minutes after, on Easy Red and Fox Green at the eastern end of Omaha. Their tank support was to be provided by the 741st Tank Battalion, again two companies swimming ashore and the third landed conventionally. Three companies of the 2nd Ranger Battalion were to take a fortified battery at Pointe du Hoc, five kilometers (3.1 miles) to the west of Omaha. Meanwhile, C Company 2nd Rangers was to land on the right of the 116th RCT and take the positions at Pointe de la Percée. The remaining companies of 2nd Rangers and the 5th Ranger Battalion were to follow up at Pointe du Hoc if that action proved to be successful, otherwise they were to follow the 116th into Dog Green and proceed to Pointe du Hoc overland.

The landings were scheduled to start at 06:30, "H-Hour", on a flooding tide, preceded by a 40-minute naval and 30-minute aerial bombardment of the beach defenses, with the DD tanks arriving five minutes before H-Hour. The infantry were organized into specially equipped assault sections, 32 men strong, one section to a landing craft, with each section assigned specific objectives in reducing the beach defenses. Immediately behind the first landings the Special Engineer Task Force was to land with the mission of clearing and marking lanes through the beach obstacles. This would allow the larger ships of the follow-up landings to get through safely at high tide. The landing of artillery support was scheduled to start at H+90 minutes while the main buildup of vehicles was to start at H+180 minutes. At H+195 minutes two further Regimental Combat Teams, the 115th RCT of the 29th Infantry Division and the 18th RCT of the 1st Infantry Division were to land, with the 26th RCT of the 1st Infantry Division to be landed on the orders of the V Corps commander.

The objective was for the beach defenses to be cleared by H+2 hours, whereupon the assault sections were to reorganize, continuing the battle in battalion formations. The draws were to be opened to allow traffic to exit the beach by H+3 hours. By the end of the day, the forces at Omaha were to have established a bridgehead 8 kilometers (5.0 miles) deep, linked up with the British 50th Division landed at Gold to the east, and be in position to move on Isigny the next day, linking up with the American VII Corps at Utah to the west.

=== Naval component ===
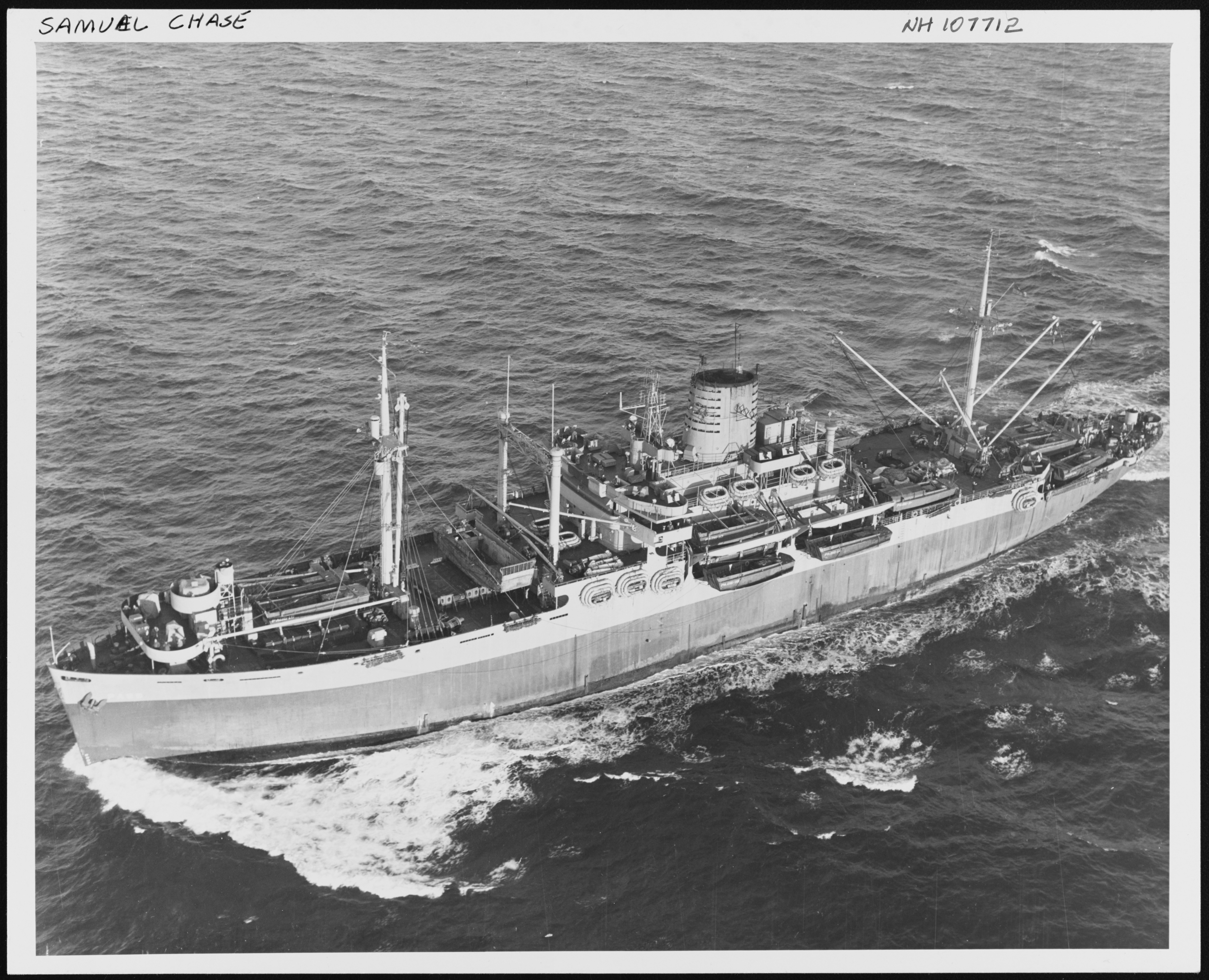
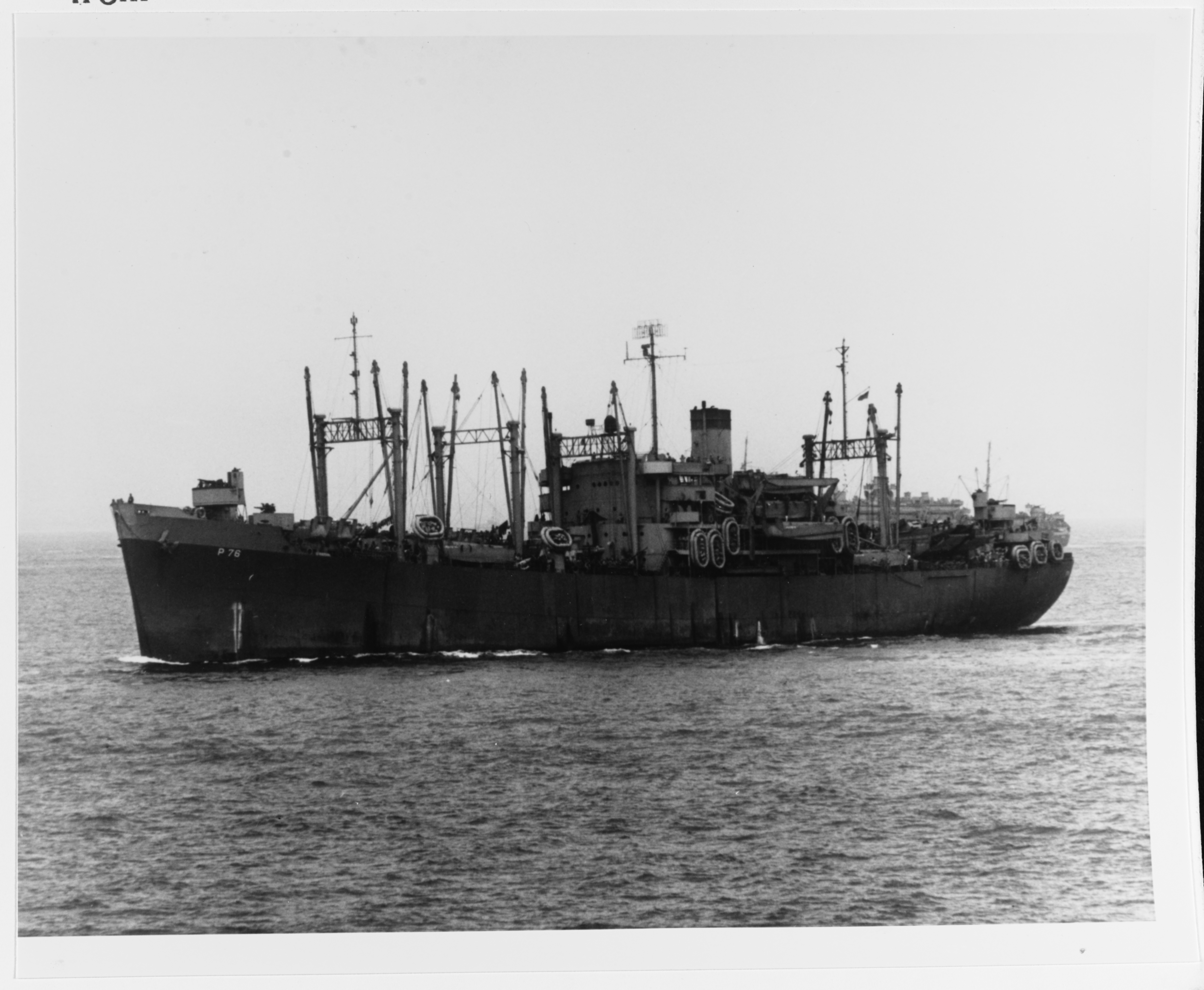
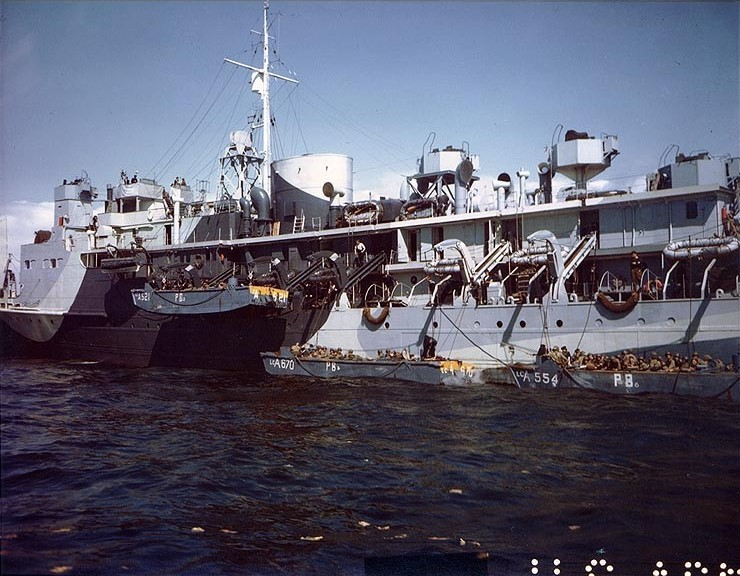
Troop transports of three types from two navies: USS Samuel Chase (APA 26) (Assault Group O1), USS Anne Arundel (XAP 76) (Assault Group O3), HMS Prince Baudouin an LSI(S) (Assault Group O4)

Task Force O, commanded by Rear Admiral John L. Hall Jr., was the naval component responsible for transporting the troops across the channel and landing them on the beaches. The task force comprised four assault groups, a support group, a bombarding force, a minesweeper group, eight patrol craft, and three anti-submarine trawlers, numbering in total 1,028 vessels.

Assault groups O1 to O3, tasked with landing the main body of the assault, were organized along similar lines, with each comprising three infantry transports and varying numbers of tank landing ships (LST), Landing Craft Control (LCC), Landing Craft Infantry (LCI(L)), Landing Craft Tank (LCT), and Landing Craft Mechanized (LCM). Assault Group O4, tasked with landing the Rangers and the Special Engineer Task Force at Pointe du Hoc and Dog Green, comprised only six smaller infantry transports.

The infantry transports of assault groups O1 and O2 comprised two US Navy Attack Transport (APA or AP) ships and a Royal Navy Landing Ship, Infantry (Large) (LSI(L)). All three infantry transports of Assault Group O3 were US Navy AP ships. Each US transport typically carried 1,400 troops and 26 Landing Craft, Vehicle, Personnel (LCVP, popularly known as "Higgins Boats"), while the British LSI(L) carried 900 to 1,400 troops and 18 Landing Craft Assault (LCA). The infantry transports of Assault Group O4 – all Royal Navy ships – comprised three LSI(S) and three LSI(H), all converted fast North Sea ferries. Each of them carried 200 to 250 troops and eight LCA.

The Support Group operated a mixture of gun, rocket, flak, tank, and smoke landing craft, totaling 67 vessels. The Minesweeper Group comprised four flotillas, the 4th comprising nine Royal Navy minesweepers; the 31st comprising nine minesweepers of the Royal Canadian Navy; the 104th comprising ten Royal Navy inshore minesweepers; and the 167th comprising ten Royal Navy coastal minesweepers. Bombarding Force C comprised two battleships, three cruisers (two Free French and one Royal Navy), and 13 destroyers (three of which were provided by the Royal Navy).

== Pre-landing bombardment ==
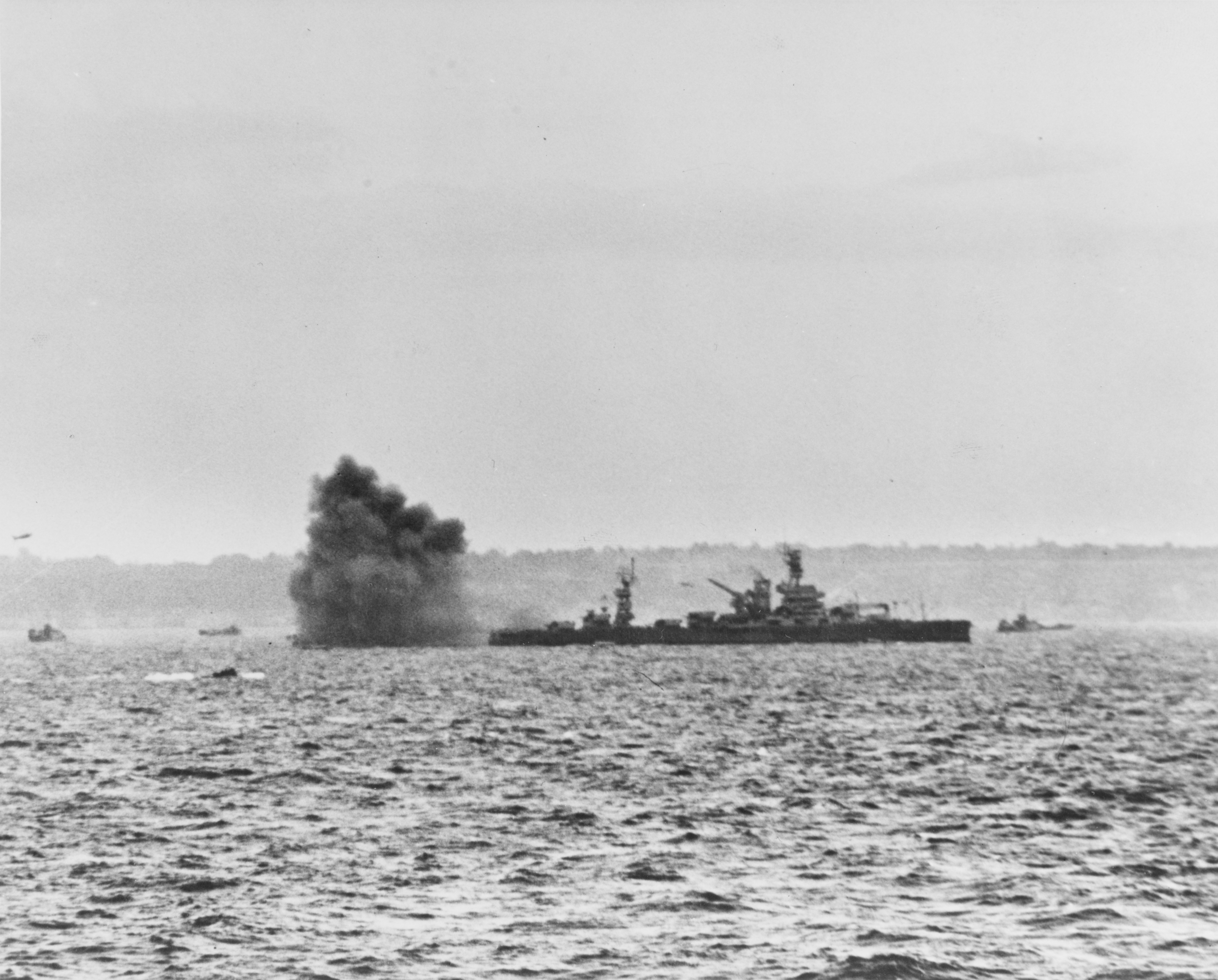
USS Arkansas engaging shore batteries off Omaha

While reviewing Allied troops in England training for D-Day, General Omar Bradley promised that the Germans on the beach would be blasted with naval gunfire before the landing. "You men should consider yourself lucky. You are going to have ringside seats for the greatest show on earth," he said, referring to the naval bombardment. However, Rear Admiral John L. Hall strongly disapproved of what he considered to be the small amount of air and naval bombardment used, saying "It's a crime to send men on the biggest amphibious attack in history with such inadequate naval gunfire support."

Just after 05:00 the Germans at Port-en-Bessin reported ships off the coast, and at 05:30 opened artillery fire on the destroyer USS Emmons. The destroyer was joined in returning fire by the Free French Georges Leygues, and later by the battleship USS Arkansas. At 05:50 the planned naval bombardment began. Pointe-du-Hoc was targeted by the battleship USS Texas, and the destroyers USS Satterlee and HMS Talybont, the latter having first destroyed the radar station at Pointe et Raz de la Percée.

The focus of the main naval bombardment was then switched to the beach defenses, and at 06:00, 36 M7 Priest howitzers and 34 tanks that were approaching the beach on LCTs began to supplement the naval guns. They were joined by fire from ten landing craft-mounted 4.7-inch guns and the rockets of nine Landing Craft Tank (Rocket), the latter planned to hit as the assault craft were just 300 meters (330 yd) from the beach.

At 06:00, 448 Consolidated B-24 Liberator heavy bombers of the United States Army Air Forces, having already completed one bombing mission over Omaha late the previous day, returned. However, with the skies overcast and under orders to avoid bombing the troops which were by then approaching the beach, the bombers overshot their targets and only three bombs fell near the beach area.

Shortly after the bombardment began, the German 916th Grenadiers reported their positions to be under particularly intense fire, with the position at WN-60 very badly hit. Although the Rangers at Pointe-du-Hoc were greatly assisted in their assault of the cliffs by the Satterlee and Talybont, elsewhere the air and naval bombardment was not so effective, and the German beach defenses and supporting artillery remained largely intact.

Later analysis of naval support during the pre-landing phase concluded that the navy had provided inadequate bombardment, given the size and extent of the planned assault. Kenneth P. Lord, a U.S. Army planner for the D-Day invasion, says that, upon hearing the naval gunfire support plan for Omaha, which limited support to one battleship, two cruisers and six destroyers, he and other planners were very upset, especially in light of the tremendous naval gunfire support given to landings in the Pacific.

Historian Adrian R. Lewis postulates that American casualties would have been greatly reduced if a longer barrage had been implemented, although the First Infantry Division Chief of Staff said that the Division would not have been able to move off the beach without effective naval gunfire.

== Initial assault ==
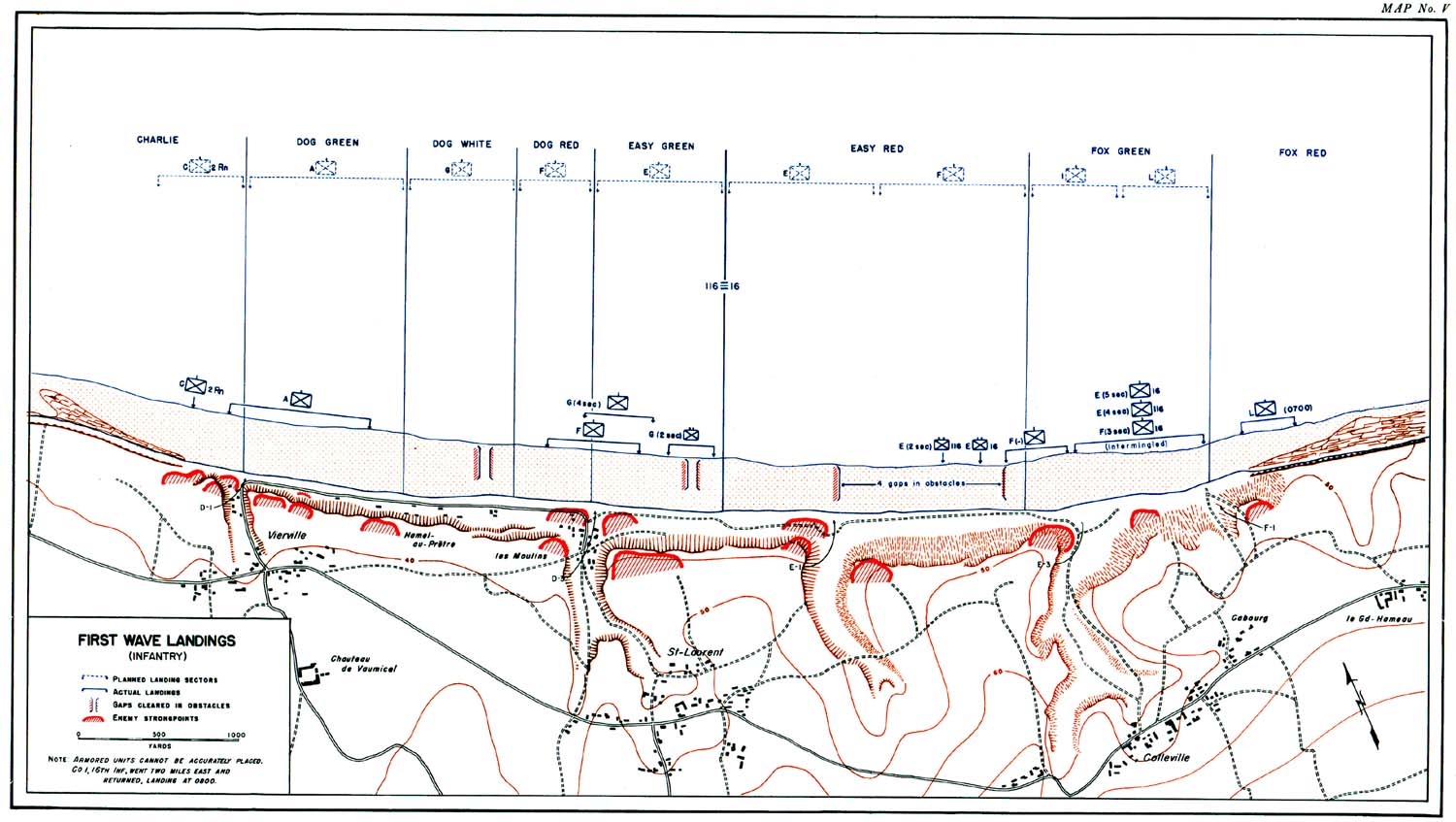
Official history map showing first assault wave landings

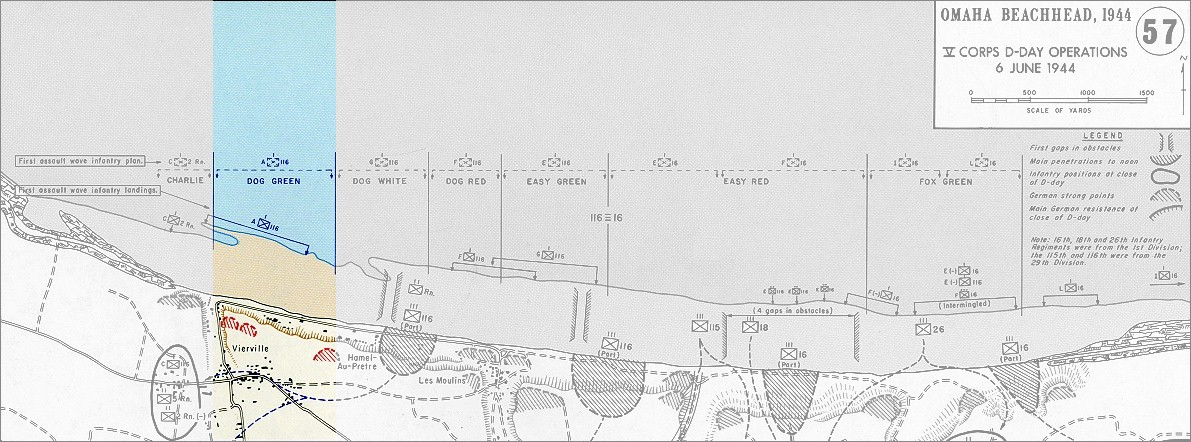
Dog Green

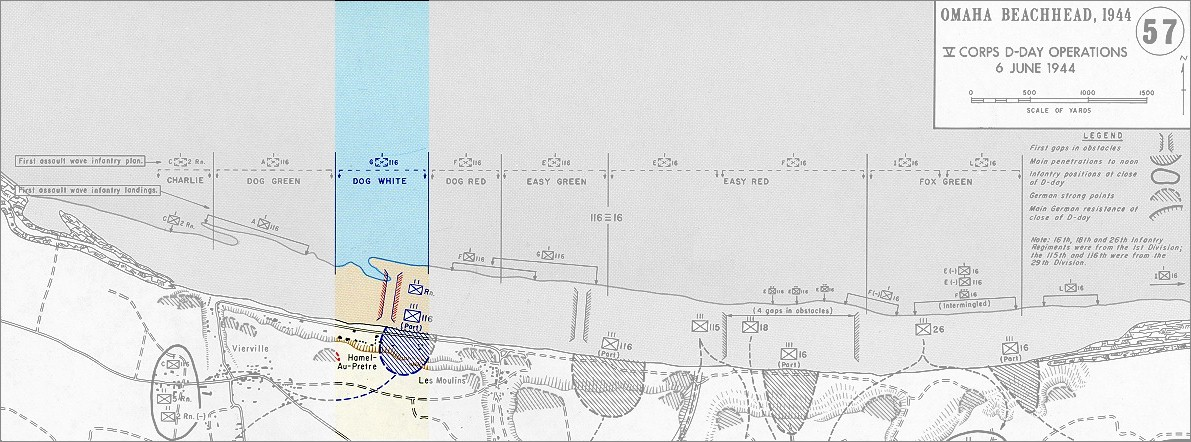
Dog White

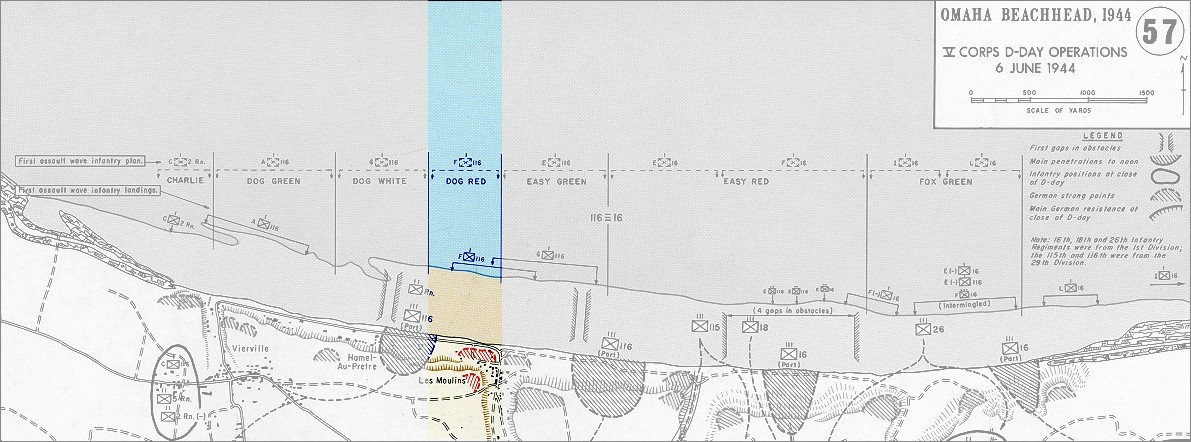
Dog Red

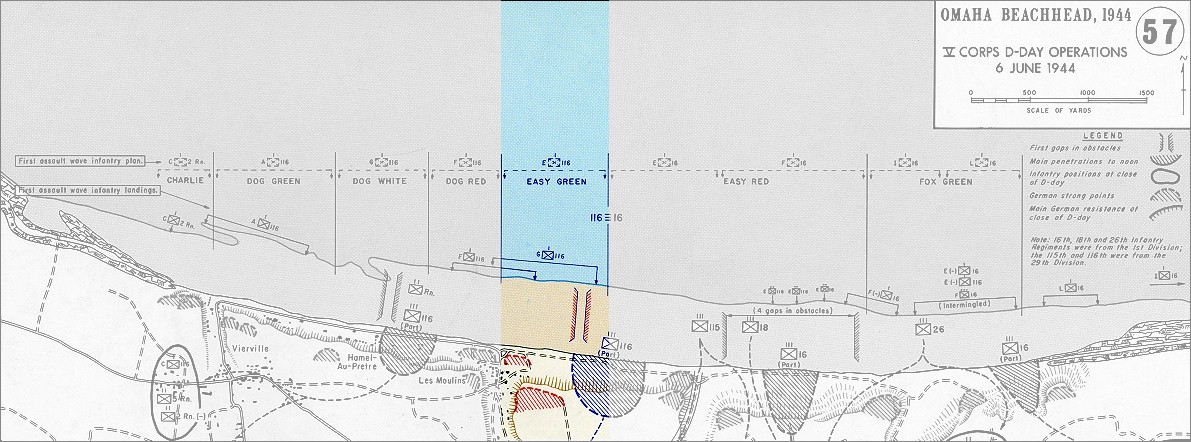
Easy Green

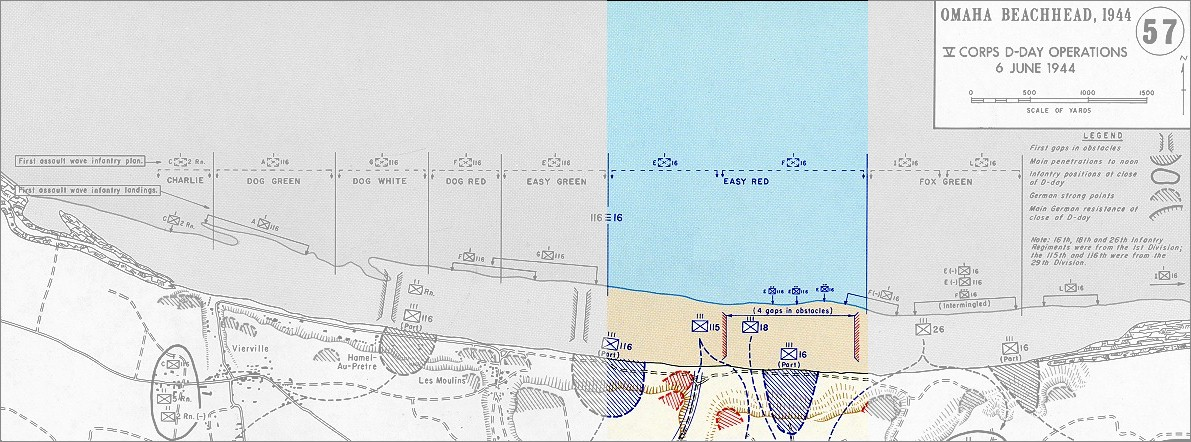
Easy Red

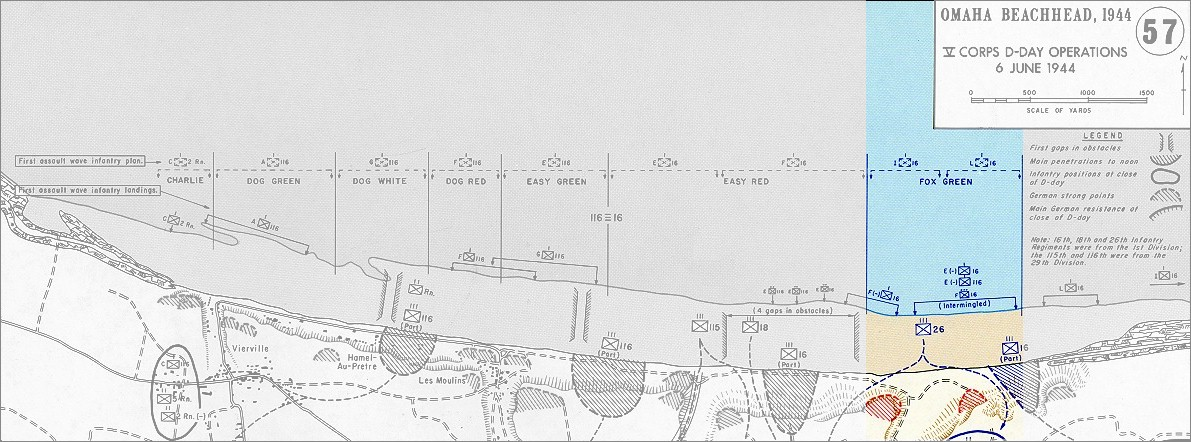
Fox Green

Despite these preparations, very little went according to plan. Ten landing craft were swamped by the rough seas before they reached the beach, and several others stayed afloat only because their passengers bailed water out with their helmets. Seasickness was prevalent among the troops waiting offshore. On the 16th RCT front, the landing boats passed struggling men in life preservers and on rafts, survivors of the DD tanks which had sunk in the rough sea. Navigation of the landing vehicles was made difficult by the smoke and mist obscuring the landmarks they were to use in guiding themselves in, while a strong current pushed them continually eastward.

As the boats approached to within a few hundred meters of the shore, they came under increasingly intense fire from automatic weapons and artillery. The force only then discovered the ineffectiveness of the pre-landing bombardment. The bombers, facing overcast conditions, had been ordered to implement a pre-arranged plan to compensate for decreased accuracy. The center of targeting was displaced inland to assure the safety of the landing allied troops. As a result, there was little or no damage to the beach defenses.

=== Tank landings ===
Because sea conditions were so rough, the decision was made for the 116th LCT to carry the DD tanks of the 743rd Tank Battalion all the way to the beach, after 27 of the initial 29 DD tanks of the 741st Tank Battalion were swamped while wading to shore. Coming in opposite the well-defended Vierville draw, Company B of the 743rd Tank Battalion lost all but one of its officers and half of its DD tanks. The other two companies landed to the left of B/743 without initial loss. On the 16th RCT front, the two DD tanks from the 741st Tank Battalion that had survived the swim ashore were joined by three others that were landed directly onto the beach because of their LCT's damaged ramp. The remaining tank company managed to land 14 of its 16 tanks (although three of these were quickly knocked out).

=== Infantry landings ===
I was the first one out. The seventh man was the next one to get across the beach without being hit. All the ones in-between were hit. Two were killed; three were injured. That's how lucky you had to be.

— Captain Richard Merrill, 2nd Ranger Battalion.

Of the nine companies landing in the first wave, only Company A of the 116th RCT at Dog Green and the Rangers to their right landed where intended. E/116, aiming for Easy Green, ended up scattered across the two beaches of the 16th RCT area. G/116, aiming for Dog White, opened up a 900-meter (1,000 yd) gap between themselves and A/116 to their right when they landed at Easy Green instead. I/16 drifted so far east it did not land for another hour and a half.

As infantry disembarked from the landing craft, they often found themselves on sandbars 50 to 90 meters (50 to 100 yd) out. To reach the beach they had to wade through water sometimes neck deep, and they still had 180 meters (200 yd) or more to go when they did reach shore. Those that made it to the shingle did so at a walking pace because they were so heavily laden. Most sections had to brave the full weight of fire from small arms, mortars, artillery, and interlocking fields of machine gun fire. Where the naval bombardment set grass fires burning, as it had at Dog Red opposite the Les Moulins strongpoint, the smoke obscured the landing troops and prevented effective fire from being laid down by the defenders. Some sections of G/116 and F/116 were able to reach the shingle bank relatively unscathed, though the latter became disorganized after the loss of their officers. G/116 was able to retain some cohesion, but this was soon lost as they made their way westwards under fire along the shingle in an attempt to reach their assigned objectives. The scattering of the boats was most evident on the 16th RCT front, where parts of E/16, F/16 and E/116 had intermingled, making it difficult for sections to come together to improvise company assaults that might have reversed the situation caused by the mis-landings. Those scattered sections of E/116 landing at Easy Red were able to escape heavy casualties, although, having encountered a deep runnel after being landed on a sandbank, they were forced to discard most of their weapons to make the swim ashore.

Omaha Beach, Easy Red sector or environs. At 0:39, this clip shows a large cadre of men running up a foggy beach covered in Czech hedgehogs.

Casualties were most severe among the troops landing at either end of Omaha. In the east at Fox Green and the adjacent stretch of Easy Red, scattered elements of three companies were reduced to half strength by the time they gained the relative safety of the shingle, many of them having crawled the 270 meters (300 yd) of beach just ahead of the incoming tide. Within 15 minutes of landing at Dog Green on the western end of the beach, A/116 had been cut to pieces, the leaders among the 120 or so casualties, (Note: Official estimates put the casualties for A/116 as high as two thirds, but of the more than 200 strong company Neillands and De Normann report that the unit "...had 91 men killed and almost as many wounded. Less than 20 men got across the beach." Stephen Ambrose reports that the company "...had lost 96% of its effective strength.") the survivors reduced to seeking cover at the water's edge or behind obstacles. The smaller Ranger company to their right had fared a little better, having made the shelter of the bluffs, but were also down to half strength.

L/16 eventually landed, 30 minutes late, to the left of Fox Green, taking casualties as the boats ran in and more as they crossed the 180 meters (200 yd) of beach. The terrain at the very eastern end of Omaha gave them enough protection to allow the 125 survivors to organize and begin an assault of the bluffs. They were the only company in the first wave able to operate as a unit. All the other companies were, at best, disorganized, mostly leaderless and pinned down behind the shingle with no hope of carrying out their assault missions. At worst, they had ceased to exist as fighting units. Nearly all had landed at least a few hundred meters off target, and in an intricately planned operation where each section on each boat had been assigned a specific task, this was enough to throw the whole plan off.

=== Engineer landings ===
Like the infantry, the engineers had been pushed off their targets, and only five of the 16 teams arrived at their assigned locations. Three teams came in where there were no infantry or armor to cover them. Working under intense fire, the engineers set about their task of clearing gaps through the beach obstacles—work made more difficult by loss of equipment, and by infantry passing through or taking cover behind the obstacles they were trying to blow. They also suffered heavy casualties as enemy fire set off the explosives they were working with. Eight men of one team were dragging their pre-loaded rubber boat off the LCM when artillery hit; only one survived the resulting detonation of their supplies. Another team had just finished laying its explosives when the area was struck by mortar fire. The premature explosion of the charges killed or wounded 19 engineers, as well as some nearby infantry. Nevertheless, the engineers succeeded in clearing six gaps, one each at Dog White and Easy Green on the 116th RCT front, the other four at Easy Red on the 16th RCT front. They had suffered casualties of over 40 percent.

== Second assault wave ==
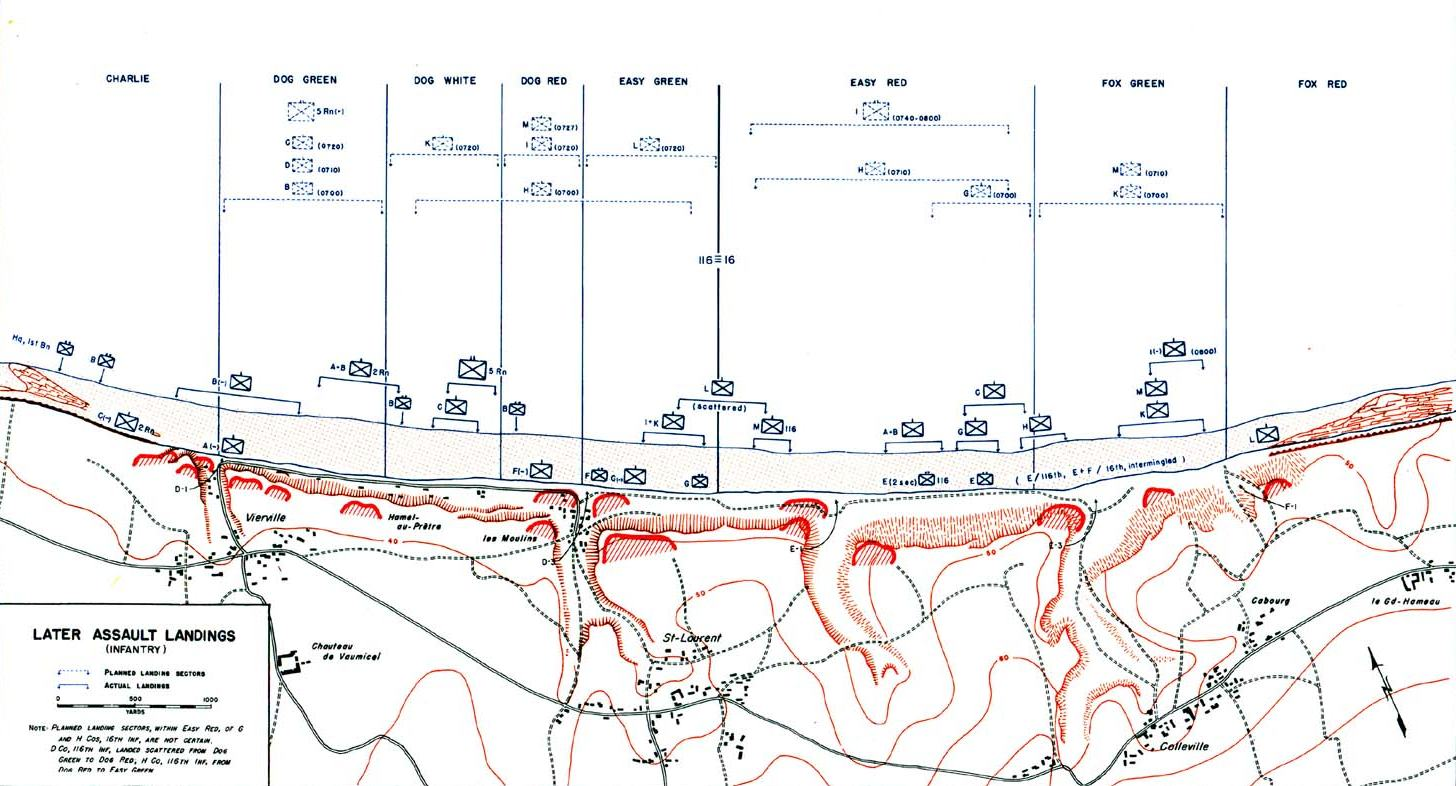
Official history map showing the second assault wave landings.

With the initial targets unaccomplished, the second and larger wave of assault landings brought in reinforcements, support weapons and headquarters elements at 07:00 to face nearly the same difficulties as had the first. The second wave was larger, and so the defenders' fire was less concentrated. The survivors of the first wave were unable to provide effective covering fire, and in places the fresh landing troops suffered casualty rates as high as those of the first wave. Failure to clear paths through the beach obstacles also added to the difficulties of the second wave. In addition, the incoming tide was beginning to hide the remaining obstacles, causing high attrition among the landing craft before they had reached the shore. As in the initial landings, difficult navigation caused disruptive mislandings, scattering the infantry and separating vital headquarters elements from their units.

On the 116th RCT front, the remainder of the 1st Battalion, B/116, C/116 and D/116, were due to land in support of A/116 at Dog Green. Three boats, including their headquarters and beach-master groups, landed too far west, under the cliffs. Their exact casualties in getting across the beach are unknown, but the one-third to one-half that made it to shore spent the rest of the day pinned down by snipers. Not all sections of the badly scattered B/116 landed there, but those that did were quickly forced to join those survivors of A/116 fighting for survival at the water's edge. Two companies of 2nd Rangers, coming in later on the edge of Dog Green, did manage to reach the seawall, but at the cost of half their strength.

To the left of Dog Green sat Dog White, between the Vierville and Les Moulins strongpoints (defending draws D-1 and D-3); and here was a different story. As a result of earlier mis-landings, and now because of their own mis-landing, the troops of C/116 found themselves alone at Dog White, with a handful of tanks from the first wave in sight. With the smoke from the grass fires covering their advance up the beach, they gained the seawall with few casualties, and were in better shape than any unit on the 116th RCT front so far. Although the 1st Battalion was effectively disarmed of its heavy weapons when D/116 suffered a disastrous landing, the buildup at Dog White continued. C/116 was joined by the 5th Ranger Battalion almost in its entirety. The Ranger battalion commander, Col. Max Schneider, recognizing the situation at Dog Green on the run-in, ordered the assault craft to divert into Dog White. Like the C/116, the smoke covered their advance, although the 2nd Rangers were caught out on the right flank of the Ranger's landing. This was where the 116th RCT regimental command group, including the 29th Division assistant commander Brig. Gen. Norman "Dutch" Cota, was able to land relatively unscathed.

Further east, the strongpoint defenses were effective. On the Dog Red/Easy Green boundary, the defenses around the Les Moulins strongpoint took a heavy toll on the remaining 2nd Battalion, with H/116 and headquarters elements struggling ashore there. The survivors joined the remnants of F/116 behind the shingle, and here the battalion commander was able to organize 50 men for an improvised advance across the shingle. A further advance up the bluffs just east of Les Moulins was too weak to have any effect and was forced back down. To their left, mainly between the draws on the Easy Green/Easy Red boundary, the 116th RCT's support battalion landed without too much loss, although they did become scattered, and were too disorganized to play any immediate part in an assault on the bluffs.

On the 16th RCT front, at the eastern end of Easy Red, was another area between strongpoints. This allowed G/16 and the support battalion to escape complete destruction in their advance up the beach. Nevertheless, most of G/16's 63 casualties for the day came before they had reached the shingle. The other 2nd Battalion company landed in the second wave; H/16 came in a few hundred yards to the left, opposite the E-3 draw, and suffered for it – they were put out of action for several hours.

On the easternmost beach, Fox Green, elements of five different companies had become entangled, and the situation was little improved by the equally disorganized landings of the second wave. Two more companies of the 3rd Battalion joined the melee, and, having drifted east in the first wave, I/16 finally made their traumatic landing on Fox Green, at 08:00. Two of their six boats were swamped on their detour to the east, and as they came in under fire, three of the four remaining boats were damaged by artillery or mines, and the fourth was hung up on an obstacle. A captain from this company found himself senior officer, and in charge of the badly out of shape 3rd Battalion.

=== American situation ===
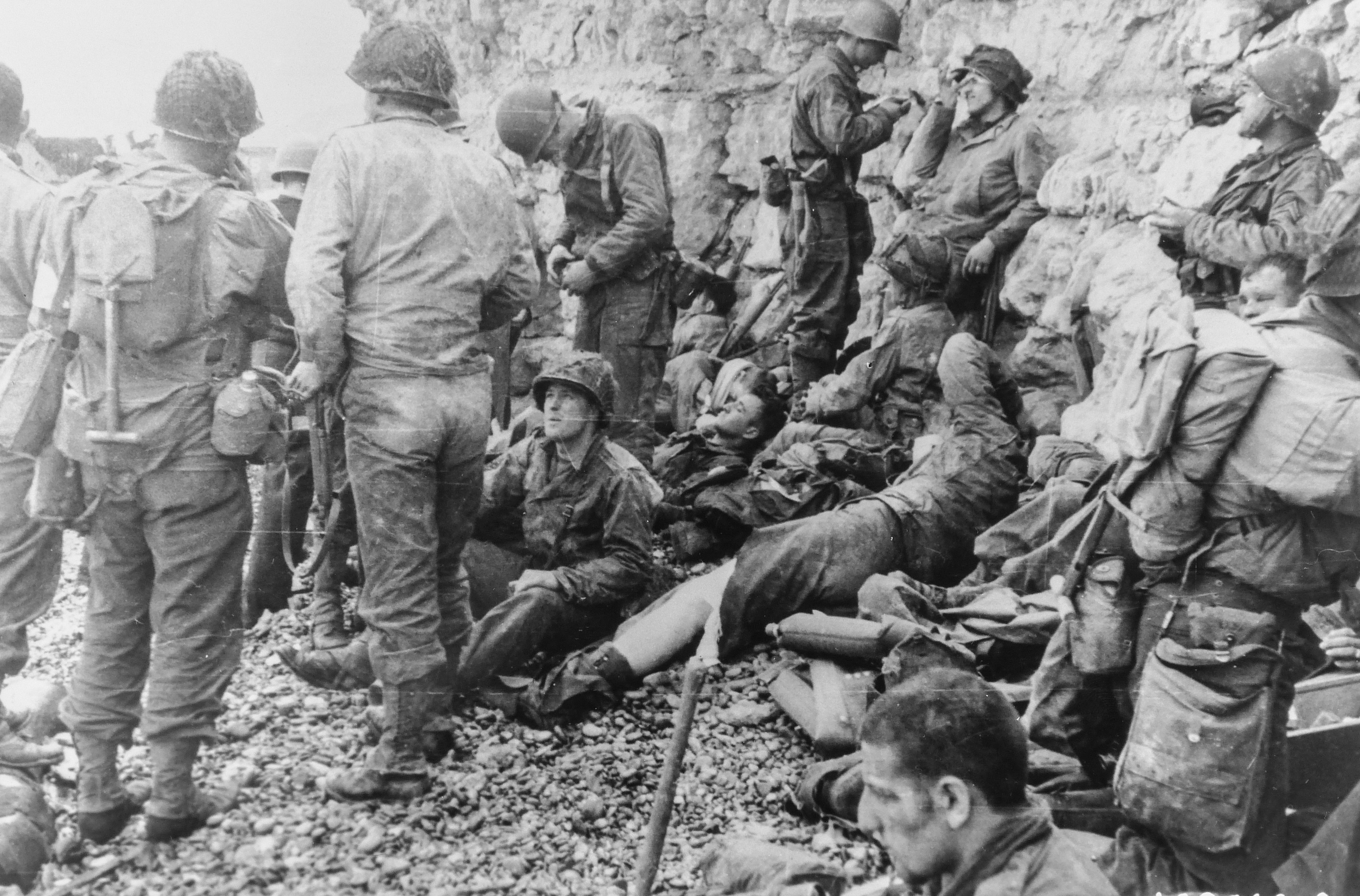
Assault troops of the 3rd Battalion, 16th RCT, from the first two waves, shelter under the chalk cliffs (which identify this as an area of Fox Red).

Along with the infantry landing in the second wave, supporting arms began to arrive, meeting the same chaos and destruction as had the rifle companies. Combat engineers, tasked with clearing the exits and marking beaches, landed off-target and without their equipment.

Many half-tracks, jeeps and trucks foundered in deep water; those that made it ashore soon became jammed up on the narrowing beach, making easy targets for the German defenders. Most of the radios were lost, making the task of organizing the scattered and dispirited troops even more difficult, and those command groups that did make the shore found their effectiveness limited to their immediate vicinity. Except for a few surviving tanks and a heavy weapons squad here or there, the assault troops had only their personal weapons, which, having been dragged through surf and sand, invariably needed cleaning before they could be used.

The survivors at the shingle, many facing combat for the first time, found themselves relatively well-protected from small arms fire, but still exposed to artillery and mortars. In front of them lay heavily mined flats exposed to active fire from the bluffs above. Morale naturally became a problem. Many groups were leaderless and witnesses to the fate of neighboring troops and landings coming in around them. Wounded men on the beach were drowning in the incoming tide and incoming landing craft were being pounded and set ablaze.

=== German situation ===
By 07:35, the third battalion of the 726th Grenadier Regiment, defending Draw F-1 on Fox Green beach, was reporting that 100–200 American troops had penetrated the front, with troops inside the wire at WN-62 and WN-61 attacking the Germans from the rear. From the German vantage point at Pointe de la Percée, overlooking the whole beach from the western end, it seemed that the assault had been stopped at the beach. An officer there noted that troops were seeking cover behind obstacles, and counted ten tanks burning. Thus, as late as 13:35, the 352nd division was reporting that the assault had been hurled back into the sea.

Heinrich Severloh, a machine-gunner at WN62 with the soubriquet "The Beast of Omaha", claimed to have fired 13,500 rounds from an MG 42 and 400 using two Karabiner 98k rifles, a total weight of ammunition of over 375 kilograms. While these figures appear across several accounts, they are based solely on Severloh's personal memory, expressed over half a century later. Historians remain sceptical as his numbers imply a rate of fire and hit ratio considered implausible.

Casualties among the defenders were mounting. While the 916th Regiment, defending the center of the 352nd zone, was reporting that the landings had been frustrated, it was also requesting reinforcements. The request could not be met, because the situation elsewhere in Normandy was becoming more urgent for the defenders. The reserve force of the German 352nd Division, the 915th Regiment, which had earlier been deployed against the US airborne landings to the west of Omaha, was diverted to the Gold Beach zone east of Omaha, where German defenses were crumbling.

== Breakthrough ==
"Are you going to lay there and get killed, or get up and do something about it?"

— Unidentified lieutenant, Easy Red.

The key geographical features that had influenced the landings also influenced the next phase of the battle: the draws, the natural exits off the beaches, were the main targets in the initial assault plan. The strongly concentrated defenses around these draws meant that the troops landing near them quickly became incapable of carrying out a further assault. In the areas between the draws, at the bluffs, units were able to land in greater strength. Defenses were also weaker away from the draws, thus most advances were made there.

The other key aspect of the next few hours was leadership. The original plan was in tatters, with so many units mis-landed, disorganized and scattered. Most commanders had fallen or were absent, and there were few ways to communicate, other than shouted commands. In places, small groups of men, sometimes scratched together from different companies, in some cases from different divisions, were "...inspired, encouraged or bullied..." out of the relative safety of the shingle, starting the dangerous task of reducing the defenses atop the bluffs.

=== Assaulting the bluffs ===
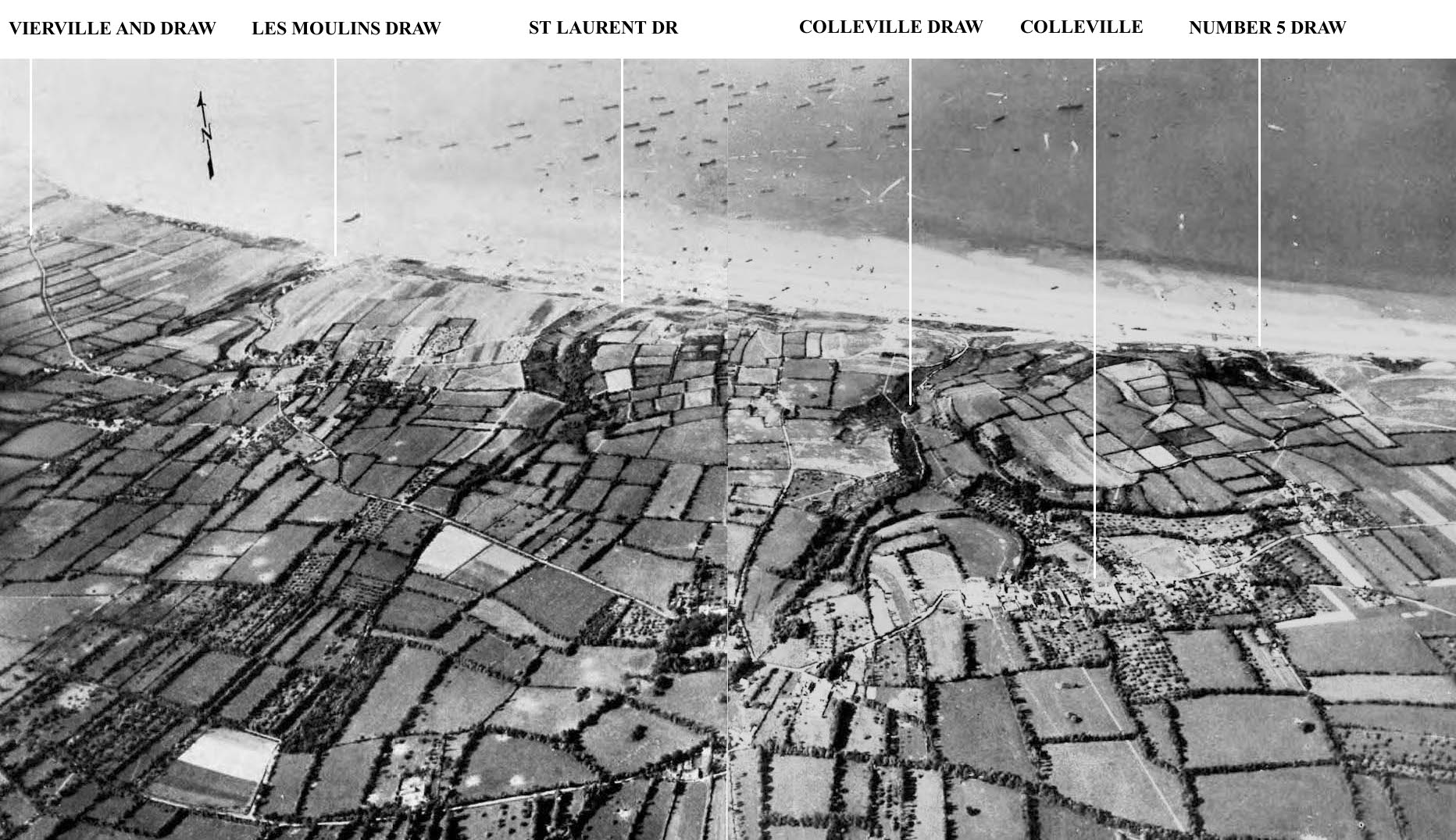
Aerial view of Omaha showing the draws, left to right; Vierville (D-1), Les Moulins (D-3), St. Laurent (E-1), Colleville (E-3) and "Number 5 Draw" (F-1).

Survivors of C company 2nd Rangers in the first wave landed on Dog Green around 06:45; by 07:30, they had scaled the cliffs near Dog Green and the Vierville draw. They were joined later by a mis-landed section from B/116, and this group spent the better part of the day tying up and eventually taking WN-73, which defended draw D-1 at Vierville.

At 07:50, Cota led the charge off of Dog White, between WN-68 and WN-70, by forcing gaps in the wire with a Bangalore torpedo and wire cutters. Twenty minutes later, the 5th Rangers joined the advance, and blew more openings. The command party established themselves at the top of the bluff, and elements of G/116 and H/116 joined them, having earlier moved laterally along the beach, and now the narrow front had widened to the east. Before 09:00, small parties from F/116 and B/116 reached the crests just east of Dog White. The right flank of this penetration was covered by the survivors of the 2nd Rangers’ A and B companies, who had independently fought their way to the top between 08:00 and 08:30. They took WN-70 (already heavily damaged by naval shells), and joined the 5th Rangers for the move inland. By 09:00, more than 600 American troops, in groups ranging from company sized to just a few men, had reached the top of the bluff opposite Dog White and were advancing inland.

The 3rd battalion 116th RCT forced its way across the flats and up the bluff between WN-66 (which defended the D-3 draw at Les Moulins), and WN-65 (defending the E-1 draw). They advanced in small groups, supported by the heavy weapons of M/116, who were held at the base of the bluff. Progress was slowed by mines on the slopes of the bluff, but elements of all three rifle companies, as well as a stray section of G/116, had gained the top by 09:00, causing the defenders at WN-62 to mistakenly report that both WN-65 and WN-66 had been taken.

Between 07:30 and 08:30 elements of G/16, E/16, and E/116 came together and climbed the bluffs at Easy Red, between WN-64 (defending the E-1 draw) and WN-62 (the E-3 draw). At 09:05, German observers reported that WN-61 was lost, and that one machine gun was still firing from WN-62. 150 men, mostly from G/16, having reached the top hampered more by minefields than by enemy fire, continued south to attack the WN-63 command post on the edge of Colleville. Meanwhile, E/16, led by Second Lieutenant John M. Spalding and Captain Robert L. Sheppard V, turned westward along the top of the bluffs, engaging in a two-hour battle for WN-64. His small group of just four men had effectively neutralized this point by mid-morning, taking 21 prisoners—just in time to prevent them from attacking freshly landing troops. On the beach below, the 16th RCT commander, Colonel George Taylor had landed at 08:15. With the words "Two kinds of people are staying on this beach, the dead and those who are going to die – now let's get the hell out of here!" he organized groups of men regardless of their unit, putting them under the command of the nearest non-commissioned officer and sending them through the area opened up by G/16. By 09:30, the regimental command post was set up just below the bluff crest, and the 1st and 2nd battalions of the 16th RCT were being sent inland as they reached the crest.

On Fox Green, at the eastern end of Omaha, four sections of L/16 had survived their landing intact and were now leading elements of I/16, K/16 and E/116 up the slopes. With supporting fire from the heavy weapons of M/16, tanks and destroyers, this force eliminated WN-60, which defended the draw at F-1; by 09:00, the 3rd battalion 16th RCT was moving inland.

=== Naval support ===
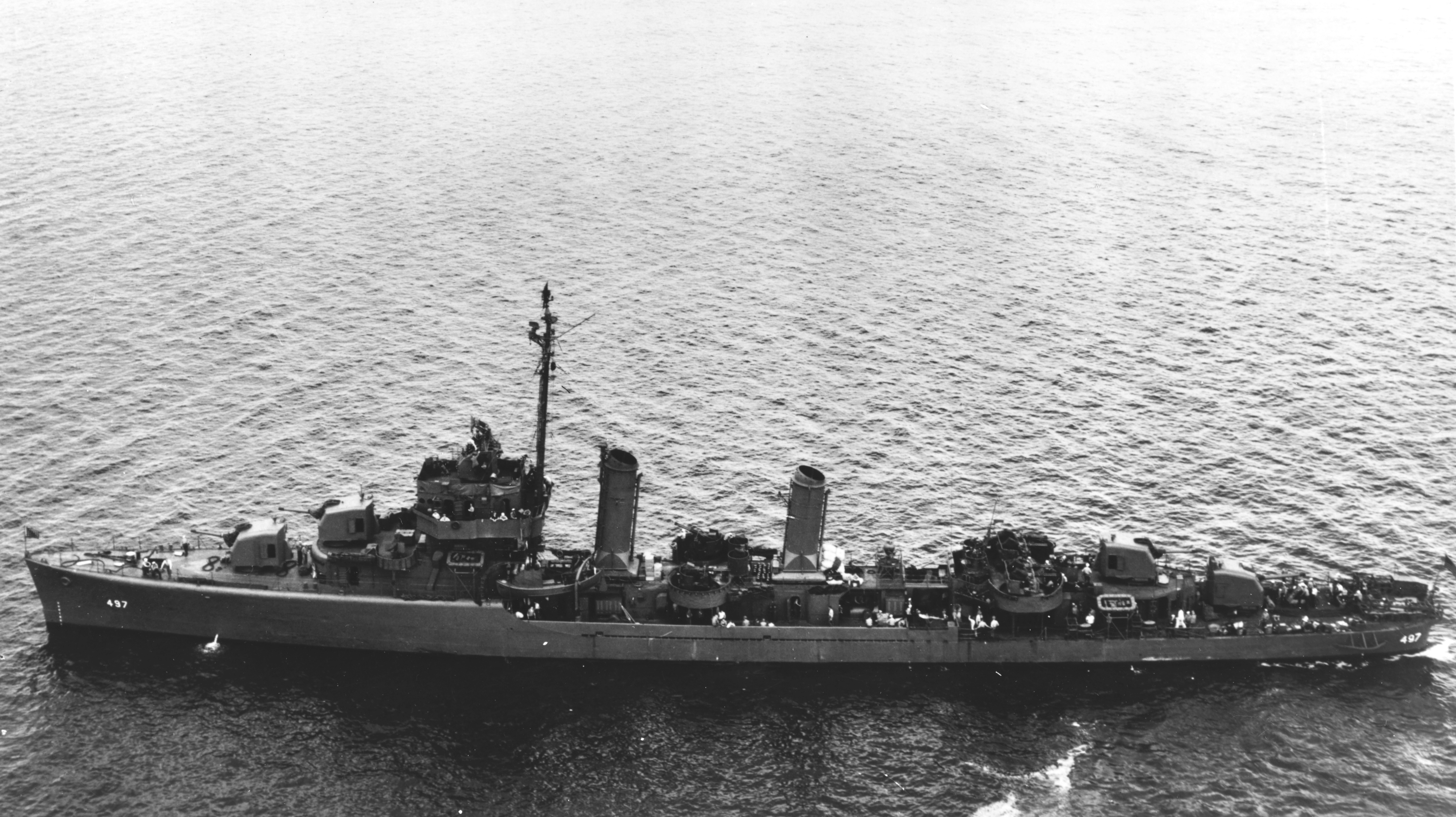
USS Frankford

The only artillery support for the troops making these tentative advances was from the navy. Finding targets difficult to spot, and in fear of hitting their own troops, the big guns of the battleships and cruisers concentrated fire on the flanks of the beaches. The destroyers were able to get in closer, and from 08:00 began engaging their own targets. At 09:50, two minutes after the McCook destroyed a 75 mm (3.0 in) gun position in WN-74, the destroyers were ordered to get as close in as possible. Some approached within 900 meters (1,000 yd) several times, scraping bottom and risking running aground. An engineer who had landed in the first wave at Fox Red, watching the Frankford steaming in towards shore, thought she had been badly hit and was being beached. Instead, she turned parallel to the beach and cruised westwards, guns blazing at targets of opportunity. Thinking she would turn back out to sea, the engineer soon saw that she had instead begun backing up, guns still firing. At one point, gunners aboard the Frankford saw an immobilized tank at the water's edge, still firing. Watching the fall of its shot, they followed up with a salvo of their own. In this manner, the tank acted as the ship's fire control party for several minutes.

=== German defenses inland ===
While the coastal defenses had not turned back the invasion at the beach, they had broken up and weakened the assault formations struggling through them. The German emphasis on this main line of resistance (MLR) meant that defenses further inland were significantly weaker, and based on small pockets of prepared positions smaller than company sized in strength. This tactic was enough to disrupt American advances inland, making it difficult even to reach the assembly areas, let alone achieve their D-Day objectives. As an example of the effectiveness of German defenses despite weakness in numbers, the 5th Ranger battalion was halted in its advance inland by a single machine gun position hidden in a hedgerow. One platoon attempted to outflank the position, only to run into another machine gun position to the left of the first. A second platoon dispatched to take this new position ran into a third, and attempts to deal with this met with fire from a fourth position. The success of the MLR in blocking the movement of heavy weapons off the beach meant that, after four hours, the Rangers were forced to give up on attempts to move them any further inland.

== Beachhead ==
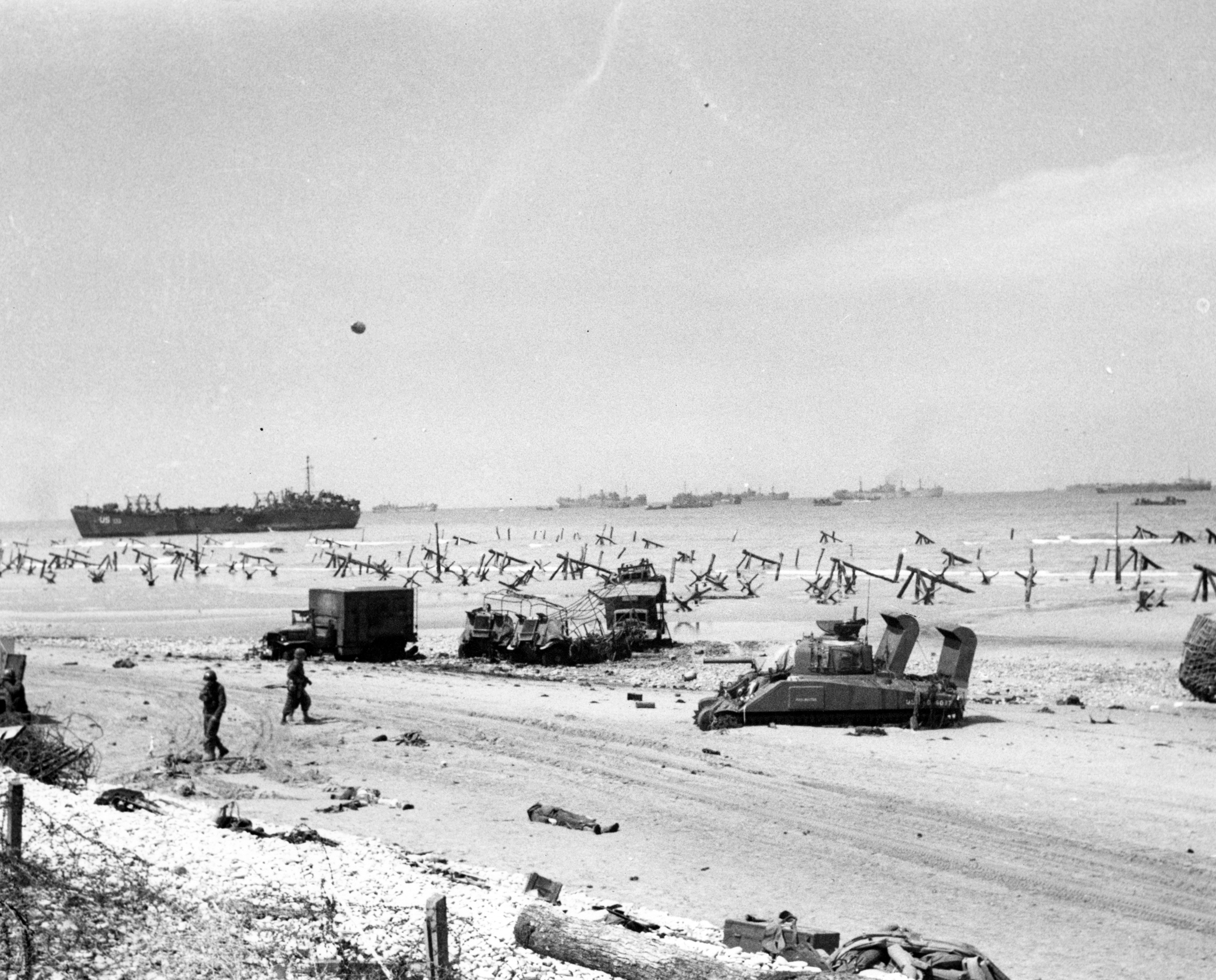
Dog White sector of Omaha after D-Day. Destroyed Thorneycroft and Austin radar trucks from the British RAF 21 BDS remain on the beach.

Despite penetrations inland, the key beach objectives had not been achieved. The draws necessary for the movement of vehicles off the beach had not been opened, and the strongpoints defending these were still putting up a spirited resistance. The failure to clear beach obstacles forced subsequent landings to concentrate on Easy Green and Easy Red.

Where vehicles were landing, they found a narrow strip of beach with no shelter from enemy fire. Around 08:30, commanders suspended all such landings. This caused a jam of landing craft out to sea. The DUKWs had a particularly hard time of it in the rough conditions. Thirteen DUKWs carried the 111th Field Artillery Battalion of the 116th RCT; five were swamped soon after disembarking from the LCT, four were lost as they circled in the rendezvous area while waiting to land, and one capsized as they turned for the beach. Two were destroyed by enemy fire as they approached the beach and the lone survivor managed to offload its howitzer to a passing craft before it also succumbed to the sea. This one gun eventually landed in the afternoon.

The official record of Omaha reports that "...the tanks were leading a hard life...". According to the commander of the 2nd battalion 116th RCT the tanks "...saved the day. They shot the hell out of the Germans, and got the hell shot out of them." As the morning progressed the beach defenses were gradually being reduced, often by tanks. Scattered along the length of the beach, trapped between the sea and the impassable shingle embankment and with no operating radios amongst the commanders, tanks had to be controlled individually. This was perilous work. The commanding officer of the 111th Field Artillery, who had landed ahead of his unit, was killed as he tried to direct the fire of one tank. The command group of the 741st Tank Battalion lost three out of their group of five in their efforts. Additionally, the commander of the 743rd tank battalion became a casualty as he approached one of his tanks with orders. When naval gunfire was brought to bear against the strong-points defending the E-3 draw, a decision was made to try to force this exit with tanks. Colonel Taylor ordered all available tanks into action against this point at 11:00. Only three were able to reach the rallying point, and two were knocked out as they attempted to go up the draw, forcing the remaining tank to back off.

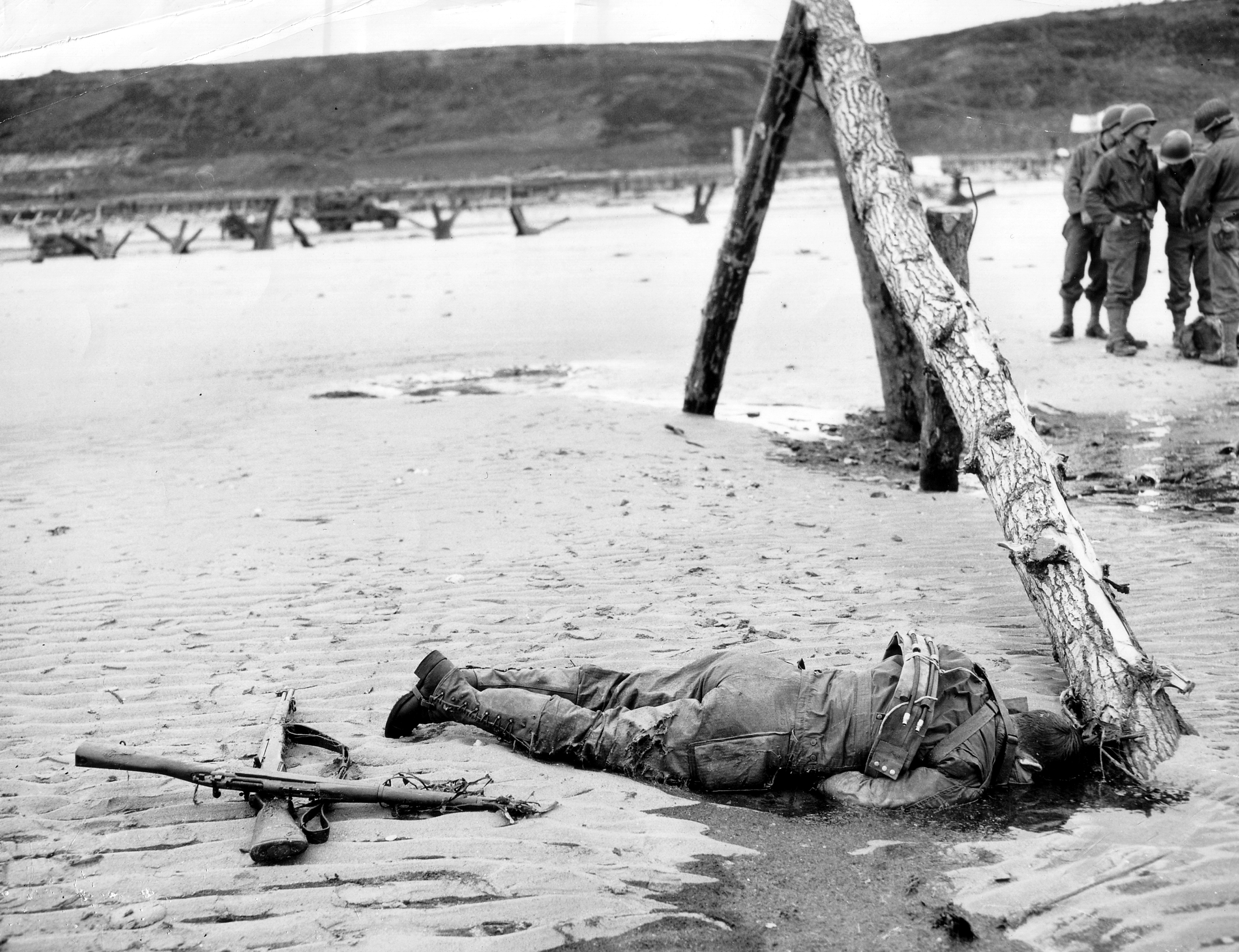
An American casualty of the morning's battle

Reinforcement regiments were due to land by battalion, beginning with the 18th RCT at 09:30 on Easy Red. The first battalion to land, 2/18, arrived at the E-1 draw 30 minutes late after a difficult passage through the congestion offshore. Casualties were light, though. Despite the existence of a narrow channel through the beach obstacles, the ramps and mines there accounted for the loss of 22 LCVPs, 2 LCI(L)s and 4 LCTs. Supported by tank and subsequent naval fire, the newly arrived troops took the surrender at 11:30 of the last strong-point defending the entrance to the E-1 draw. Although a usable exit was finally opened, congestion prevented an early exploitation inland. The three battalions of the 115th RCT, scheduled to land from 10:30 on Dog Red and Easy Green, came in together and on top of the 18th RCT landings at Easy Red. The confusion prevented the remaining two battalions of the 18th RCT from landing until 13:00, and delayed the move off the beach of all but 2/18, which had exited the beach further east before noon, until 14:00. Even then, this movement was hampered by mines and enemy positions still in action further up the draw.

By early afternoon, the strong-point guarding the D-1 draw at Vierville was silenced by the navy. But without enough force on the ground to mop up the remaining defenders, the exit could not be opened. Traffic was eventually able to use this route by nightfall, and the surviving tanks of the 743rd tank battalion spent the night near Vierville.

The advance of the 18th RCT cleared away the last remnants of the force defending the E-1 draw. When engineers cut a road up the western side of this draw, it became the main route inland off the beaches. With the congestion on the beaches thus relieved, they were re-opened for the landing of vehicles by 14:00. Further congestion on this route, caused by continued resistance just inland at St. Laurent, was bypassed with a new route, and at 17:00, the surviving tanks of the 741st tank battalion were ordered inland via the E-1 draw.

The F-1 draw, initially considered too steep for use, was also eventually opened when engineers laid down a new road. In the absence of any real progress opening the D-3 and E-3 draws, landing schedules were revised to take advantage of this route, and a company of tanks from the 745th tank battalion were able to reach the high ground by 20:00.

Approaches to the exits were also cleared, with minefields lifted and holes blown in the embankment to permit the passage of vehicles. As the tide receded, engineers were also able to resume their work of clearing the beach obstacles, and by the end of the evening, 13 gaps were opened and marked.

== German reactions ==
Observing the build-up of shipping off the beach, and in an attempt to contain what were regarded as minor penetrations at Omaha, a battalion was detached from the 915th Regiment being deployed against the British to the east. Along with an anti-tank company, this force was attached to the 916th Regiment and committed to a counterattack in the Colleville area in the early afternoon. It was stopped by "firm American resistance" and reported heavy losses.

The strategic situation in Normandy precluded the reinforcement of the weakened 352nd Division. The main threat was felt by the Germans to be the British beachheads to the east of Omaha, and these received the most attention from the German mobile reserves in the immediate area of Normandy. Preparations were made to bring up units stationed for the defense of Brittany, southwest of Normandy, but these would not arrive quickly and would be subject to losses inflicted in transit by overwhelming Allied air superiority. The last reserve of the 352nd Division, an engineer battalion, was attached to the 916th Regiment in the evening. It was deployed to defend against the expected attempt to break out of the Colleville-St. Laurent beachhead established on the 16th RCT front.

At midnight General Dietrich Kraiss, commander of the 352nd Division, reported the total loss of men and equipment in the coastal positions. He advised that he had sufficient forces to contain the Americans on D+1 but that he would need reinforcements thereafter. He was told that there were no more reserves available.

== RAF at Omaha Beach ==
In order to provide frontline infantry the best possible aerial protection, both on the beaches and as they moved forward to secure the beachhead, it was necessary that the Allied Air Forces provided radar detection and guidance to be in place on the evening of the D-Day invasion.

As a result, a small force of about 160 Royal Air Force technical personnel, together with their attached supporting signals and other units, were scheduled to land on Omaha beach in Normandy at high tide on D-Day (about 11:00), immediately after the first waves of American assault troops had secured the beach and their engineers had made it safe.

As the United States did not have their own radar available by D-Day, it was agreed that a British Mobile Ground Controlled Interception Radar Units, (GCI 15082), would be lent to the US. The British mobile radars, being able to detect the range, bearing and height of potential enemy aircraft, were ideally suited for this role, provided they could be located on favorable sites and were available for immediate use on the night of the landings. GCI 15082 was formed as a Ground Controlled Interception unit in August 1943 at Renscombe Down, near Swanage in Dorset. It was equipped with what was then the latest in radar, including height-finding apparatus, and it was used primarily for the control of night fighters in forward fighting areas. The unit was mobile, with heavy equipment mounted on Crossley trucks and smaller apparatus on Bedfords. Operational status, following arrival at a designated site, was expected to be reached in two hours.

In order to provide this air cover, three Base Defence Wings (re-designated as "Sectors" – BDS – in May 1944) were begun to be formed from 1 January 1944 with the appointment of Group Captain Moseby as the Commanding Officer of No. 21 BDS at RAF Church Fenton, North Riding of Yorkshire. At a later date, the second and third Wings, Nos 24 and 25, were formed, the former with effect from 1 February 1944 at RAF Acklington, Northumberland, and the latter with effect from 1 March 1944 at RAF Castle Camps, Cambridgeshire.

The plan had been for 21 BDS to land at Easy Red Beach at around 11:30 when the tide would be in and to drive ashore. However, at the appointed hour for 21 BDS to land, the beach had not been taken, so they were ordered to circle offshore until the situation improved. Slowly, US Forces began to penetrate the bluffs and by early afternoon, at several points along the beach, advances were being made. By mid-afternoon, the first draw had been taken (E-1), quickly followed by E-3. There was now a chance to land 21 BDS, and so at 17:00, 6 hours behind schedule, they were ordered in. However, while they should have landed at the E-1 draw, they were actually put ashore closer to the D-3 draw, which was still being viciously fought over. The tide was also low, and so the vehicles were dropped far out on the flat, sandy beach into low water. There were deep, hidden channels. The whole contents of one LCT drove off the ship and straight into a deep channel, never to be seen again.

Other vehicles became stuck in deep sand and mud and became drowned out by the advancing tide. Those that made it to the edge of the shingle found themselves trapped with no exit off the beach. They became sitting targets for the German mortar and artillery shells that picked them off, one after another.

The US forces that were on the beach with them were traumatized and immobile. Many men were dead or injured. 21 BDS’ position was grave, and they too were suffering casualties. The only solution was to get off the beach and get into the shelter of a ravine.

Several of the British officers managed to organize themselves and some of the Americans to use an abandoned bulldozer to break through the shingle and effect their escape. Their plan was successful, and the remaining, unscathed vehicles were driven a few hundred meters to the comparative safety of the destroyed hamlet of Les Moulins. Out of the original 27 vehicles, only 8 survived, and 21 BDS had lost 11 dead and 39 seriously injured out of their starting complement of about 150. Six men were awarded either the Military Cross or Military Medal from 21 BDS.

Along with many detachments of the US 5th Army, they had suffered shocking losses, and had endured a frightening ordeal. Despite losing most of their equipment, they were able to re-group on 7 June and salvage some vehicles from the beach, though still under sniper fire. By the 8th June, they had established a temporary working base at the airstrip close to St. Laurent and claimed their first “kill” on the 9th June.

One tragic error that the RAF committed was to send these men into conflict in their RAF blue battle dress, treated with “anti gas” material – once this uniform got wet, it became more grey than blue and became far too similar to the German grey uniform. It was reported that, on many occasions, the ill-fated 21 BDS were being shot at from both sides.

Replacement vehicles and men were sent over after a week or so, and the rest of 21 BDS were operational by 1 July. 21 BDS went on to become the joint most successful GCI unit on the Western Front, with over 46 enemy aircraft downed in the first three months of the invasion alone.

== End of day ==
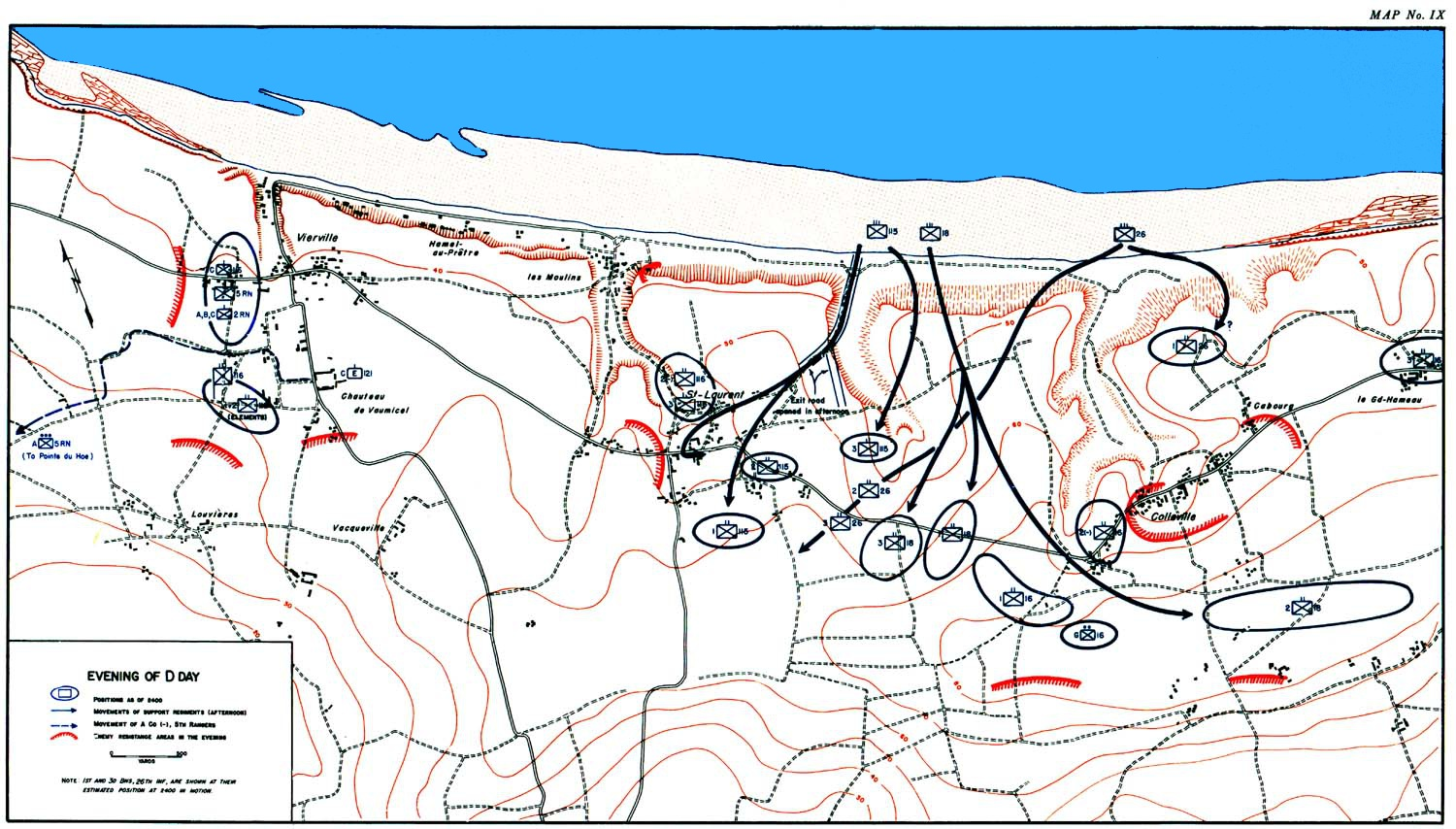
Official history map showing extent of advances made by evening.

Following the penetrations inland, confused hard-fought individual actions pushed the foothold out two and a half kilometers (1.6 miles) deep in the Colleville area to the east, less than that west of St. Laurent, and an isolated penetration in the Vierville area. Pockets of enemy resistance still fought on behind the American front line, and the whole beachhead remained under artillery fire. At 21:00 the landing of the 26th RCT completed the planned landing of infantry, but losses in equipment were high, including 26 artillery pieces, over 50 tanks, about 50 landing craft and 10 larger vessels.

Only 100 of the 2,400 tons of supplies scheduled to be landed on D-Day were landed. An accurate figure for casualties incurred by V Corps at Omaha on 6 June is not known; sources vary between 5,000 and over 6,000 killed, wounded, and missing, with the heaviest losses incurred by the infantry, tanks and engineers in the first landings. Only five tanks of the 741st Tank Battalion were ready for action the next day. The German 352nd division suffered 1,200 killed, wounded and missing; about 20% of its strength. Its deployment at the beach caused such problems that Lieutenant General Omar Bradley, commander of the U.S. First Army, at one stage considered evacuating Omaha, while Field Marshal Bernard Montgomery considered the possibility of diverting V Corps forces through Gold.

== Aftermath ==
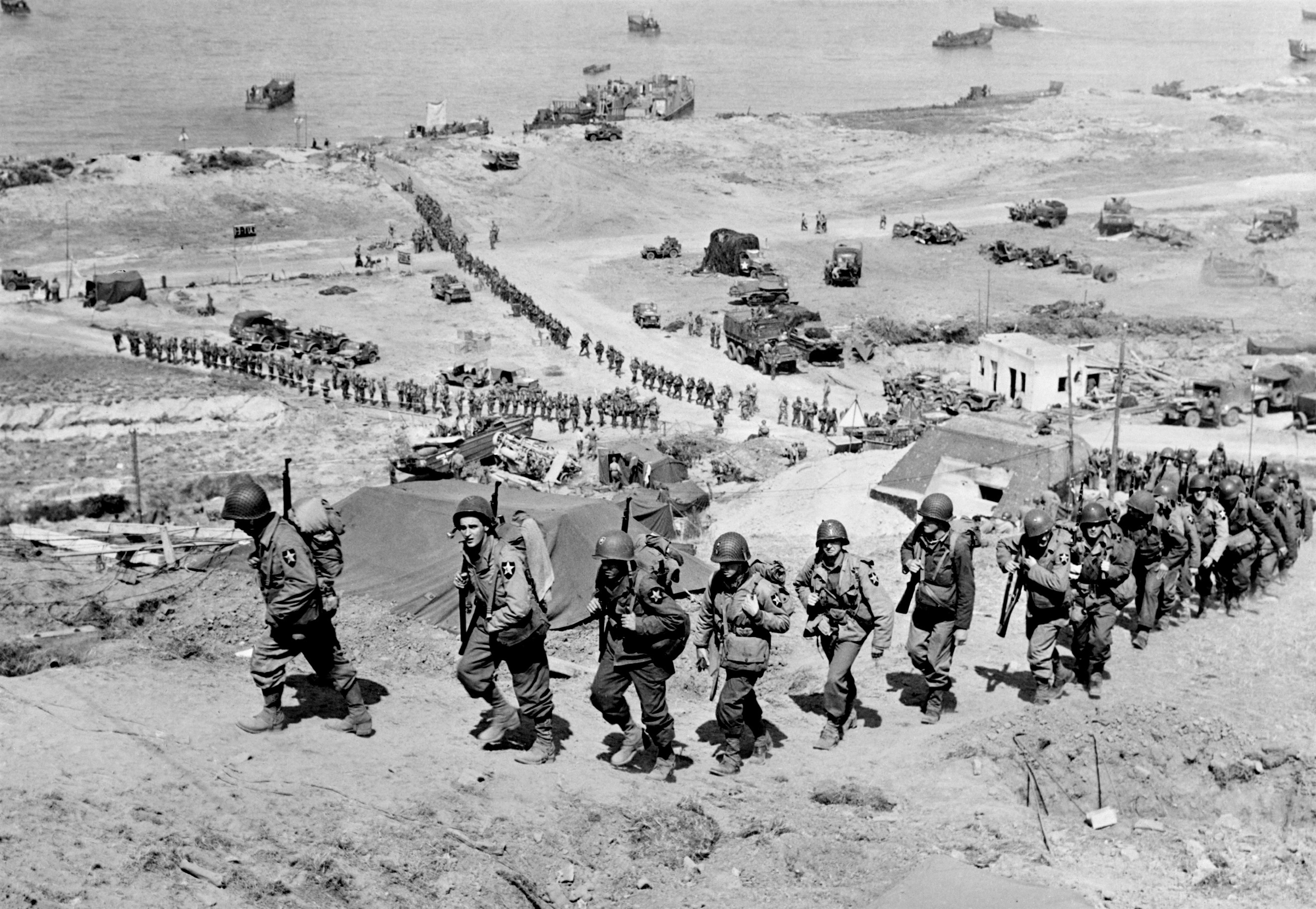
2nd Infantry Division troops and equipment going up the bluff via the E-1 draw on D+1, June 7. They are going past WN-65, which defended the route up the Ruquet Valley to Saint-Laurent-sur-Mer.

The foothold gained on D-Day at Omaha by the U.S. troops, itself two isolated pockets, was the most tenuous across all the D-Day beaches. With the original objective yet to be achieved, the priority for the Allies was to link up all the Normandy beachheads. During the course of June 7, while still under sporadic shellfire, the beach was prepared as a supply area. Surplus cargo ships were deliberately sunk to form an artificial breakwater and, while still less than planned, 1,429 tons of stores were landed that day.

With the beach assault phase completed the RCTs reorganized into infantry regiments and battalions and over the course of the next two days achieved the original D-Day objectives. On the 1st divisional front the 18th Infantry Regiment blocked an attempt by two companies from the 916th and 726th Grenadiers to break out of WN-63 and Colleville, both of which were subsequently taken by the 16th Infantry Regiment which also moved on Port-en-Bessin. The main advance was made by the 18th Infantry Regiment, with the 3rd battalion of the 26th Infantry Regiment attached, south and south-eastwards.

The most intense opposition was encountered at Formigny where troops of the 2nd battalion 915th Grenadiers had reinforced the headquarters troops of 2nd battalion 916th Grenadiers. Attempts by 3/26 and B/18 with support from the tanks of B/745 were held off and the town did not fall until the morning of June 8. The threat of an armored counterattack kept the 18th Infantry Regiment on the defensive for the rest of June 8.

The 26th Infantry Regiment's three battalions, having been attached to the 16th, 18th and 115th Regiments the previous day, spent June 8 reassembling before pushing eastwards, forcing the 1st battalion of the German 726th Grenadiers to spend the night extricating itself from the pocket thus forming between Bayeux and Port-en-Bessin. By the morning of June 9, the 1st Division had established contact with the British XXX Corps, thus linking Omaha with Gold.

On the 29th divisional front two battalions of the 116th Infantry Regiment cleared the last defenders from the bluffs while the remaining 116th battalion joined the Rangers in their move west along the coast. This force relieved the 2nd Ranger companies who were holding Pointe du Hoc on June 8 and subsequently forced the German 914th Grenadiers and the 439th Ost-Battalion to withdraw from the Grandcamp area which lay further to the west. Early on June 7 WN-69 defending St. Laurent was abandoned and the 115th Infantry Regiment was therefore able to push inland to the south-west, reaching the Formigny area on June 7 and the original D-Day phase line the following day. The third regiment of 29th Division; the 175th, started landing on June 7. By the morning of June 9 this regiment had taken Isigny and on the evening of the following day forward patrols established contact with the 101st Airborne Division, thus linking Omaha with Utah.

In the meantime, the original defender at Omaha, the 352nd Division, was being steadily reduced. By the morning of June 9 the division was reported as having been "...reduced to 'small groups'..." while the 726th Grenadier Regiment had "...practically disappeared." By June 11 the effectiveness of the 352nd was regarded as "very slight", and by June 14 the German corps command was reporting the 352nd as completely used up and needing to be removed from the line.

Once the beachhead had been secured, Omaha became the location of one of the two Mulberry harbors, prefabricated artificial harbors towed in pieces across the English Channel and assembled just off shore. Construction of 'Mulberry A' at Omaha began the day after D-Day with the scuttling of ships to form a breakwater. By D+10 the harbor became operational when the first pier was completed; LST 342 docking and unloading 78 vehicles in 38 minutes. Three days later the worst storm to hit Normandy in 40 years began to blow, raging for three days and not abating until the night of June 22. The harbor was so badly damaged that the decision was taken not to repair it; supplies being subsequently landed directly on the beach until fixed port facilities were captured. In the few days that the harbor was operational, 11,000 troops, 2,000 vehicles and 9,000 tons of equipment and supplies were brought ashore. Over the 100 days following D-Day more than 1,000,000 tons of supplies, 100,000 vehicles and 600,000 men were landed, and 93,000 casualties were evacuated, via Omaha.

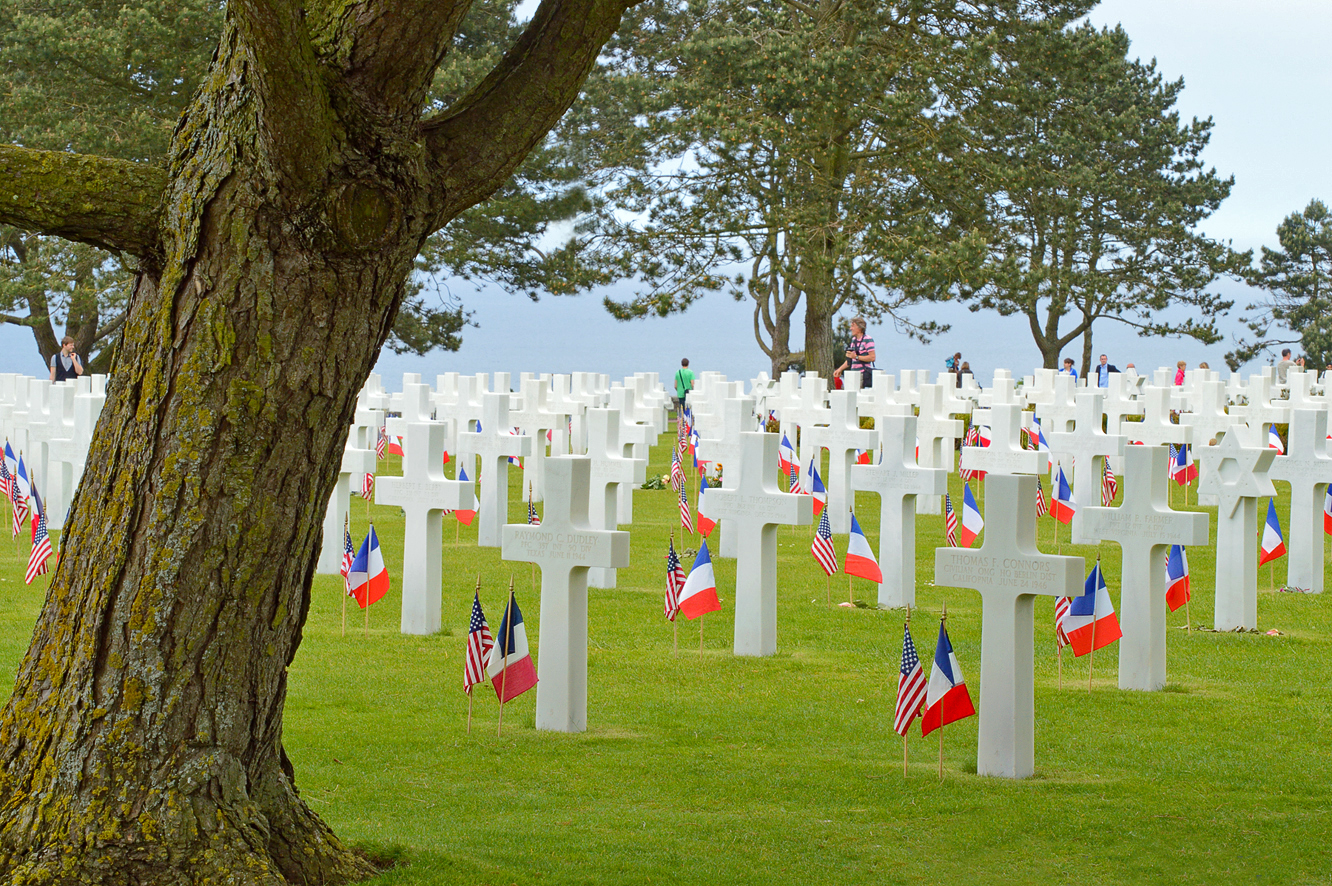
The Normandy American Cemetery and Memorial overlooking Omaha Beach

Today at Omaha jagged remains of the harbor can be seen at low tide. The shingle bank is no longer there, cleared by engineers in the days following D-Day to facilitate the landing of supplies. The beachfront is more built-up and the beach road extended, villages have grown and merged, but the geography of the beach remains as it was and the remains of the coastal defenses can still be visited. At the top of the bluff overlooking Omaha near Colleville is the American cemetery. (Note: British servicemen who died on Omaha Beach were exhumed from their initial graves in US war cemeteries and reinterred in the Bayeux war cemetery. These "grave concentrations" typically occurred late in 1944. See the cited reference for an example of this.) Particles of metal making up approximately 0.18% of the sand of the beach have been identified at Omaha, as well as glass and iron beads. This may represent the remains of military activity on the beach, although other non-military sources have not been ruled out.

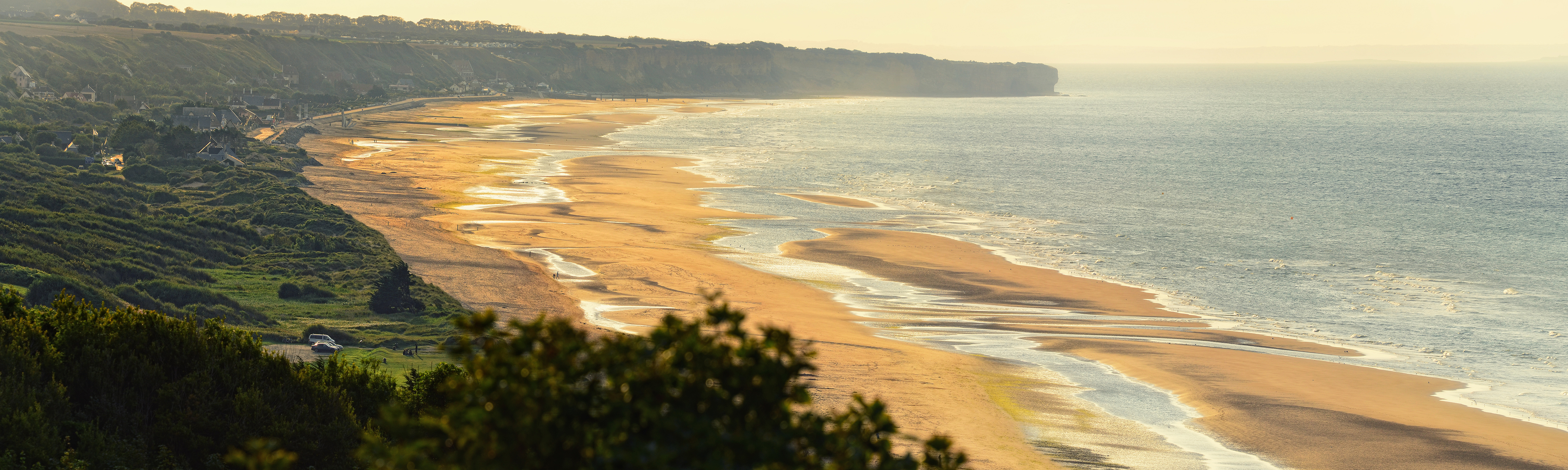
Omaha landscape 67 years after landing. Harbor remains and "Les Braves" monument can be seen on the sand beach's inland edge.

== See also ==
- John C. Raaen Jr. – retired U.S. Army major general, as of 2025, the last surviving U.S. Army Ranger of those who landed on Omaha Beach on D-Day
- List of ships in Omaha Bombardment Group
- Maisy battery – WWII German fortifications in Normandy, France - German battery behind Omaha Beach - active on D-day
- Saving Private Ryan
