= Green City =

Green City or Green Town may refer to:

- Green cities or sustainable cities, environmentally friendly cities
- Green City, Missouri, United States
- Green Town, a residential area of Lahore, Pakistan
- Bhokardan, "Green city of Maharashtra"
- Bhopal, "Green city of India"
- Etawah, "Green city of Uttar Pradesh"
- Gandhinagar, capital city of Gujarat state in India
- Rangpur, Bangladesh, "Green city of Bangladesh"
- Thiruvananthapuram, capital city of Kerala state in India, known as the "Evergreen city of India"
- Zelenograd, a city in Russia under jurisdiction of Moscow
- Zelenogradsk, a city in Kaliningrad Oblast, Russia
- Zelyony Gorod, an urban-type settlement in Russia under jurisdiction of Nizhny Novgorod

== See also ==
- Emerald City (disambiguation)
- Garden City (disambiguation)
- Garden town (disambiguation)
- Shahrisabz (disambiguation)
- Jade City, a settlement in Canada or a 2017 novel by Fonda Lee
- Verville, "green town" in French, a surname
