= Vierville-sur-Mer =

- Commune
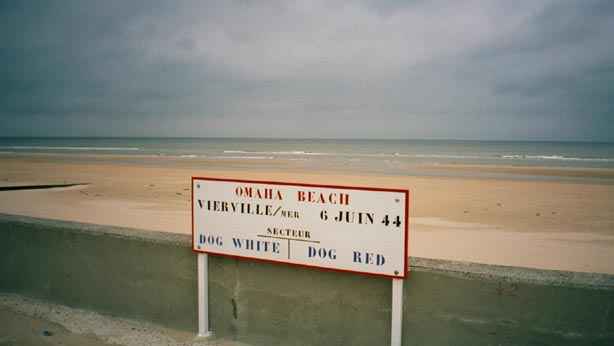
- Dog White and Dog Red sectors on Omaha Beach

- Coat of arms
- Location of Vierville-sur-Mer
- Location within France Location within Normandy
- Coordinates: 49°22′30″N 0°54′14″W
- Country: France
- Region: Normandy
- Department: Calvados
- Arrondissement: Bayeux
- Canton: Trévières
- Intercommunality: CC Isigny-Omaha Intercom

Government
  - Mayor (2020–2026): Antoine de Bellaigue
- Area^{1}: 6.41 km^{2} (2.47 sq mi)
- Elevation: 46 m (151 ft)
- Highest elevation: 62 m (203 ft)
- Lowest elevation: 0 m (0 ft)
- Population (2023): 232
  - Density: 36.2/km^{2} (93.7/sq mi)
- Time zone: UTC+01:00 (CET)
  - Summer (DST): UTC+02:00 (CEST)
- INSEE/Postal code: 14745 /14710
- ^{1} French Land Register data, which excludes lakes, ponds, glaciers > 1 km^{2} (0.386 sq mi or 247 acres) and river estuaries.

Vierville-sur-Mer (French pronunciation: [vjɛʁvil syʁ mɛʁ], literally Vierville on Sea) is a commune in the Calvados department in Normandy region in northwestern France.

== History ==
=== World War II ===
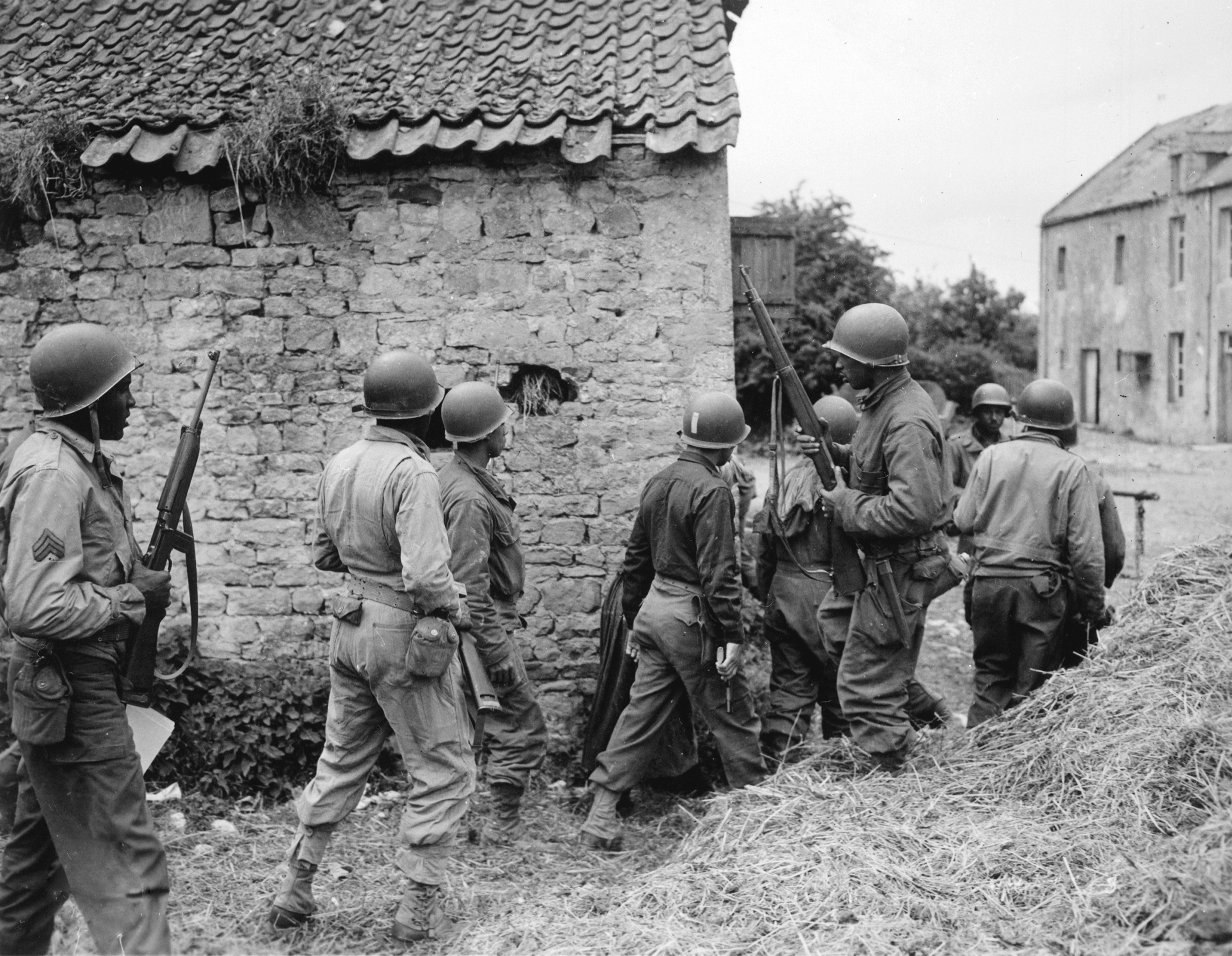
Black soldiers tracking a sniper at Vierville-sur-Mer, June 10, 1944

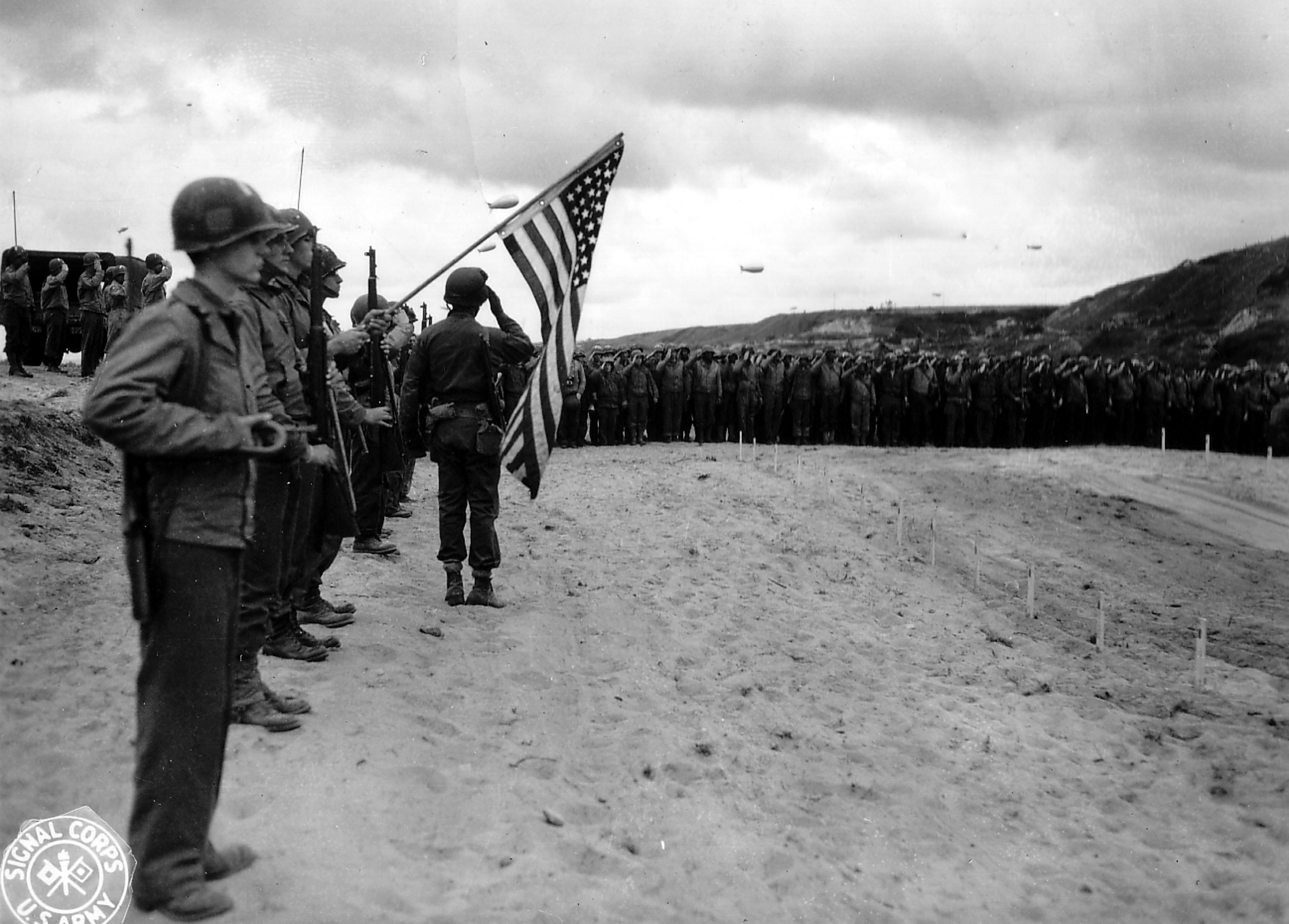
Honor guard with the flag and a bugler during a mass at the site of the first temporary cemetery in Vierville, June 10, 1944.

On 6 June 1944 (D-Day), the U.S. Army's 116th Infantry Regiment of the 29th Infantry Division, along with the 5th Ranger Battalion, and A, B, and C Companies of the 2nd Ranger Battalion landed on Dog Green, Dog White, Dog Red, and Easy Green sectors of Omaha Beach, below Vierville-sur-Mer, starting at 6.30 am.

== Population ==
Historical population
Year	Pop.	±% p.a.
1968	265	—
1975	255	−0.55%
1982	292	+1.95%
1990	256	−1.63%
1999	237	−0.85%
2007	240	+0.16%
2012	250	+0.82%
2017	229	−1.74%
2023	232	+0.22%
Source: INSEE

== See also ==
- Communes of the Calvados department
