= USS Frankford =

Gleaves-class destroyer

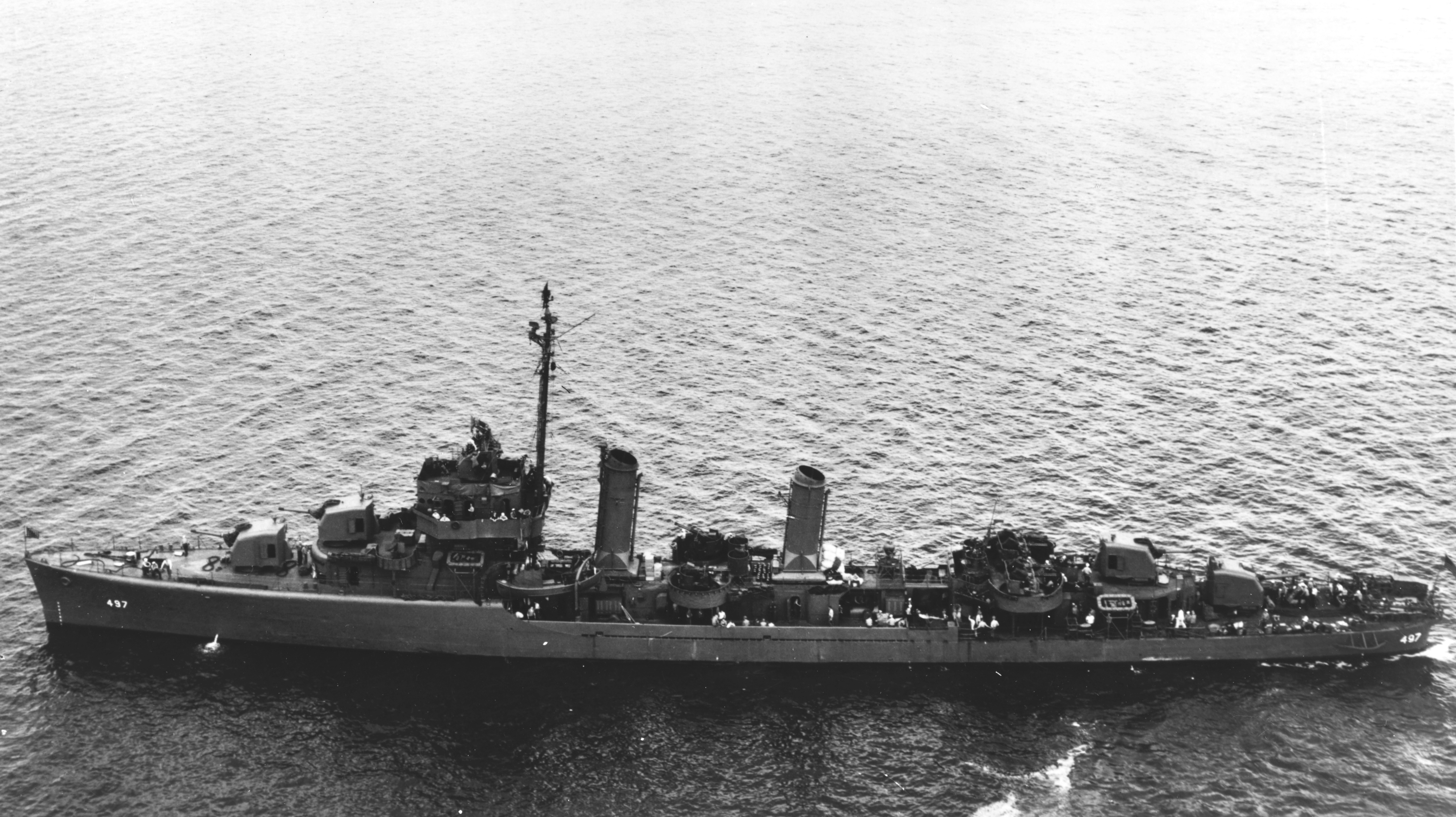
- USS Frankford (DD-497)

History

United States
- Name: Frankford
- Builder: Seattle-Tacoma Shipbuilding Corporation
- Laid down: 5 June 1941
- Launched: 17 May 1942
- Commissioned: 31 March 1943
- Decommissioned: 6 March 1946
- Stricken: 1 June 1971
- Fate: Sunk as target off Puerto Rico, 4 December 1973

General characteristics
- Class & type: Gleaves-class destroyer
- Displacement: 1,630 tons
- Length: 348 ft 3 in (106.15 m)
- Beam: 36 ft 1 in (11.00 m)
- Draft: 11 ft 10 in (3.61 m)
- Propulsion: 50,000 shp (37 MW); 4 boilers; 2 propellers
- Speed: 37.4 knots (69 km/h)
- Range: 6,500 nmi (12,000 km; 7,500 mi) at 12 kn (22 km/h; 14 mph)
- Complement: 16 officers, 260 enlisted
- Armament: 4 × 5 in (127 mm) DP guns, 2 × 2 Bofors 40 mm guns; 6 × 0.50 in (12.7 mm) guns, 6 × 20 mm AA guns, 10 × 21 inch (533 mm) torpedo tubes, 2 × depth charge tracks

USS Frankford (DD-497), a Gleaves-class destroyer, was the only ship of the United States Navy to be named for John Frankford, who commanded the privateer Belvedere during the Quasi-War with France from 1798 to 1800.

Frankford was launched on 17 May 1942 by Seattle-Tacoma Shipbuilding Co., Seattle, Washington; sponsored by Mrs. William F. Gibbs; and commissioned 31 March 1943.

== Service history ==
After coastal escort duty, Frankford made three voyages to screen convoys from the east coast to Casablanca and Northern Ireland between 27 June 1943 and 29 November. She then returned to coastal escort, antisubmarine patrols, and duty at Norfolk training prospective crews for new construction until 18 April 1944 when she sailed from New York for Plymouth, England. In preparation for the invasion of Normandy, Frankford escorted transports and other ships to training in Scottish waters and to the assembly points in the south of England, until 5 June, when she sortied from Plymouth for Omaha Beach. On D-Day, 6 June, Frankford provided gunfire support for the pinned down US assault, then joined the area screen. The Frankford turned broadside in order to train all four of its 5" guns on German machine gun nests. The action allowed troops to more successfully land on the beach. Along with rescuing survivors of mined ships and downed pilots, Frankford drove off enemy E-boat attacks. Aside from two one-day voyages to Plymouth for stores and fuel, Frankford remained on duty in the Baie de la Seine until 15 July.

Three days later, Frankford sailed from Plymouth to screen a group of landing craft to the Mediterranean, and on 6 August 1944, she arrived at Naples for the invasion of southern France. Her task force sortied 13 August, and Frankford patrolled off the invasion beaches 13 August and the days that followed. On the night of 17/18 August, she and another destroyer engaged a group of enemy torpedo boats, sinking three and capturing one, which later sank. On 30 August, she put in at Naples, and after calling at several western Mediterranean ports, the destroyer arrived at New York 3 October for overhaul.

Exercises, patrols, and hunts for submarines along the east coast occupied Frankford until 21 January 1945, when she sailed from Norfolk for a rendezvous off the Azores. Here she joined the screen for the cruiser Quincy, carrying President Franklin D. Roosevelt to Malta. Frankford served on an air-sea rescue station in the eastern Mediterranean during the President's flight out and back, and returned to New York on 27 February. The destroyer made antisubmarine patrols along the Atlantic coast and guarded aircraft carriers in training until 10 May, when she arrived at New York.

Frankford reached Pearl Harbor on 8 August 1945, and after exercising in the Hawaiian Islands, sailed to the western Pacific for occupation duty. She operated with minesweepers off the coast of Japan, covered landings on Honshū, and on 25 October sailed from Tokyo Bay for the east coast. On 4 March 1946, she was decommissioned and placed in reserve at Charleston, South Carolina.

Frankford was stricken from the Naval Vessel Register on 1 June 1971, and sunk as target off Puerto Rico on 4 December 1973.

Frankford received two battle stars for World War II.
