= List of Allied forces in the Normandy campaign =

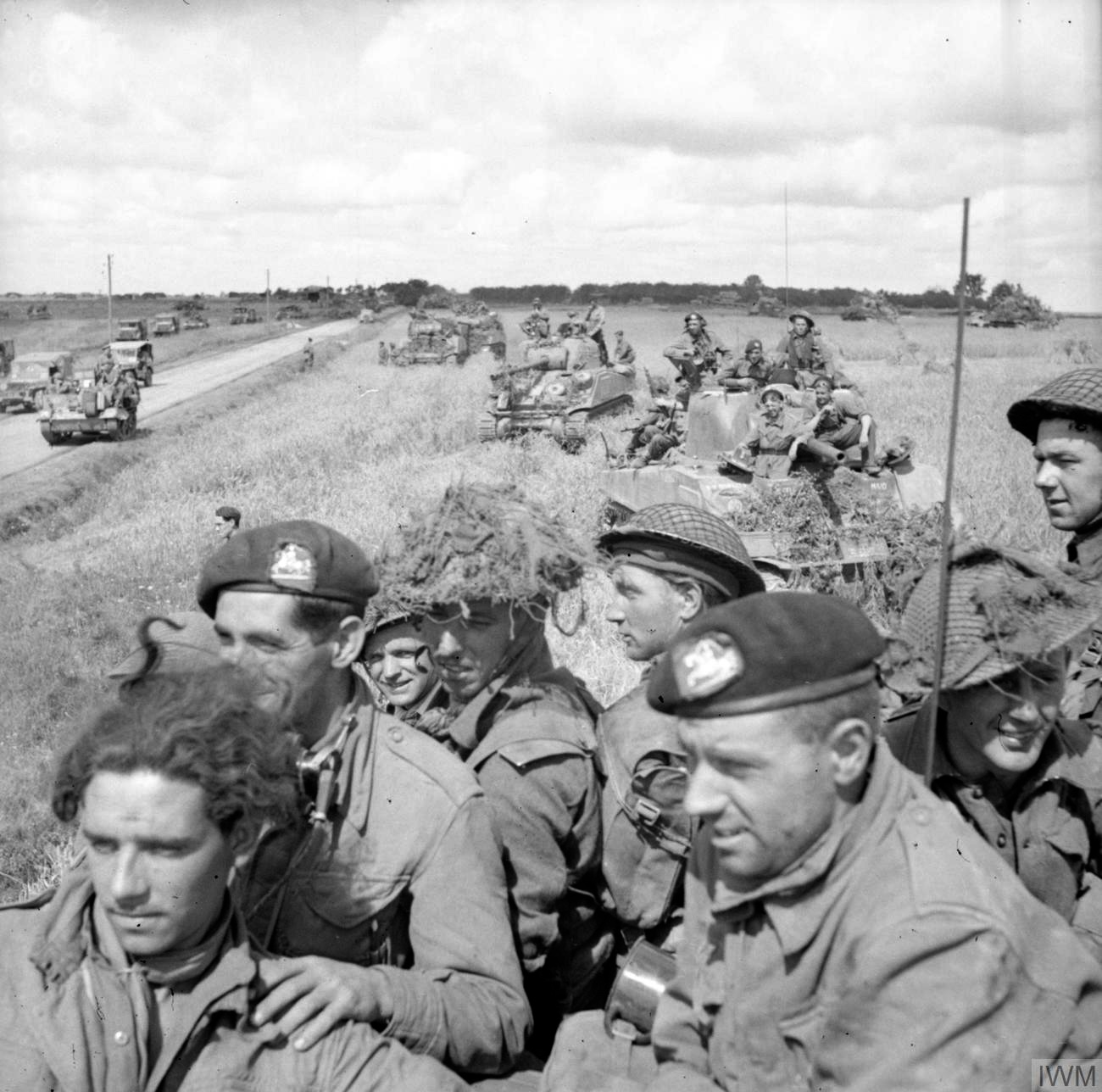
British infantry the 3rd Monmouthshire Regiment aboard Sherman tanks near Argentan, 21 August 1944

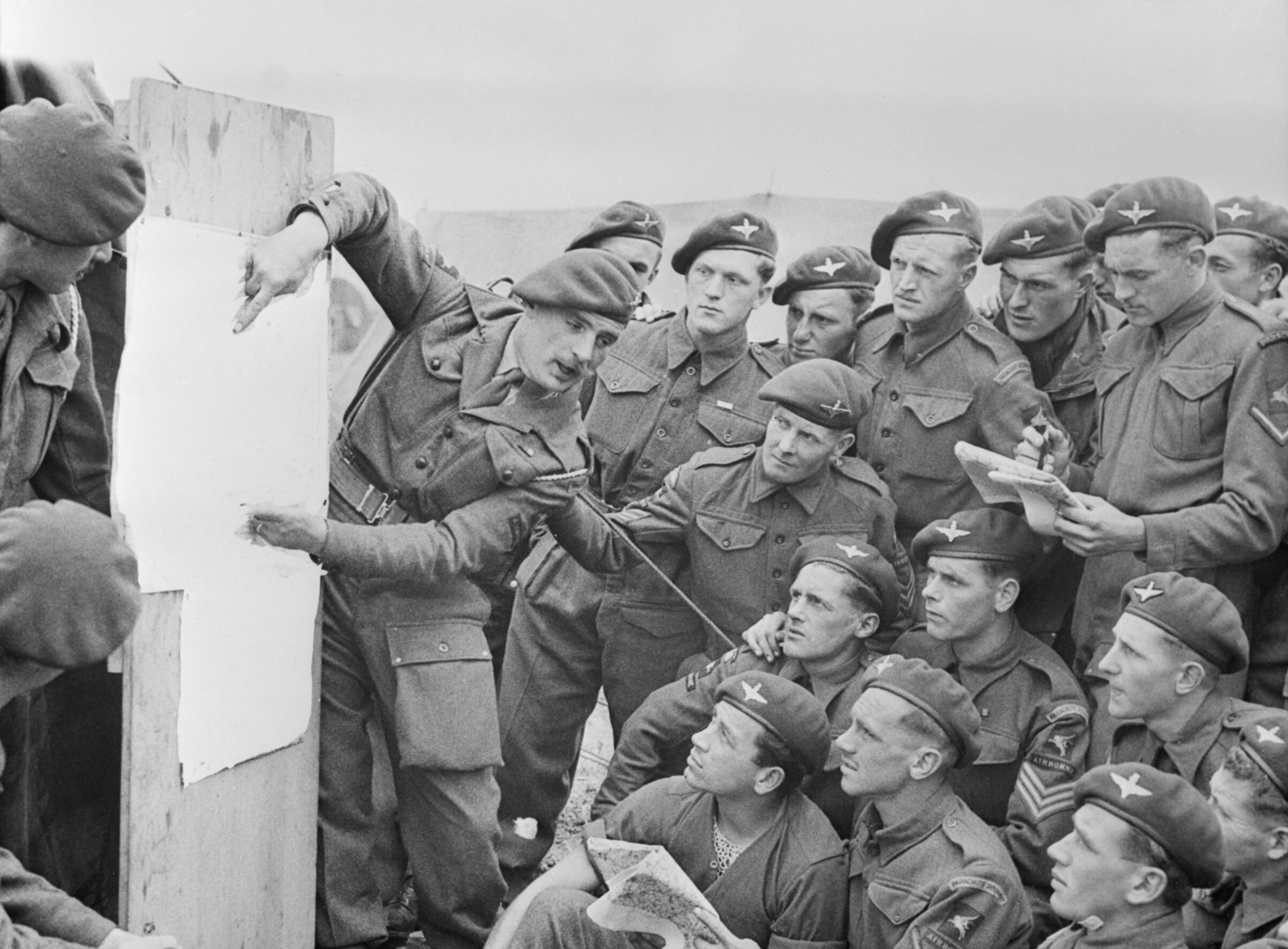
Men of the British 22nd Independent Parachute Company, 6th Airborne Division being briefed for the invasion, 4–5 June 1944

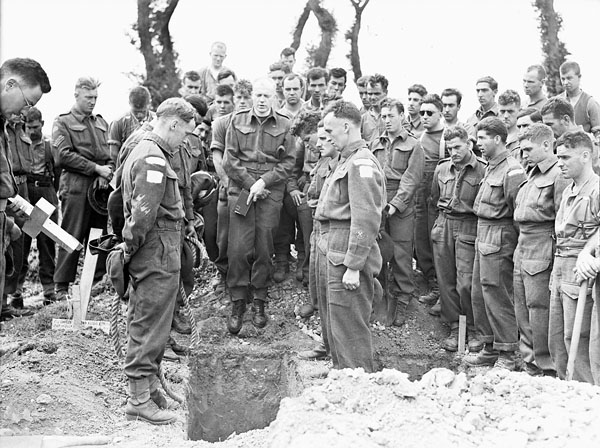
Canadian chaplain conducting a funeral service in the Normandy bridgehead, 16 July 1944

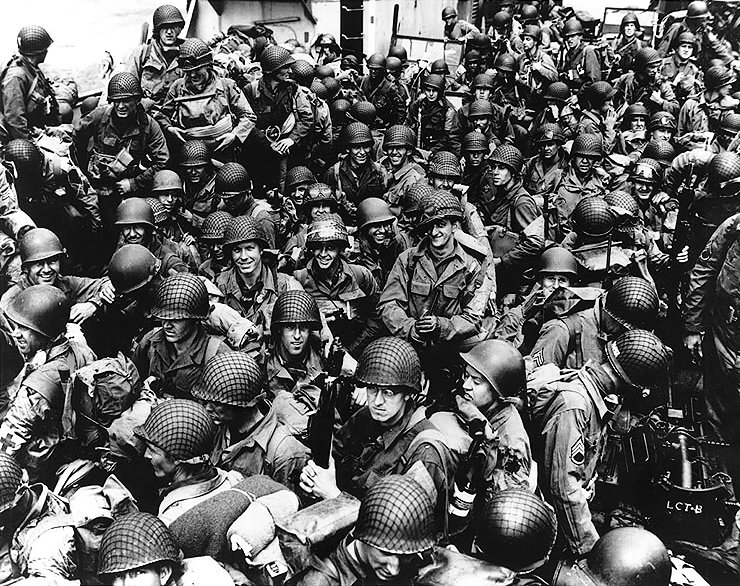
American troops on board a LCT, ready to ride across the English Channel to France. 12 June 1944.

This is a list of Allied forces in the Normandy campaign between 6 June and 25 August 1944. Primary ground combat divisions and brigades are listed here; unit articles may contain a complete order of battle.

== United States ==
Unit	Arrival	Beach	Commander
1st Infantry Division	June 6	Omaha	Major General Clarence R. Huebner
2nd Infantry Division	June 7	Omaha	Major General Walter M. Robertson
4th Infantry Division	June 6	Utah	Major General Raymond O. Barton (Note: There was panic at SHAEF HQ in Southwick House when Convoy U2 of 140 ships carrying Barton and the US 4th Infantry Division to Utah beach (which had furthest to go) failed to heed the radio message to turn back on 3 June and could not be located; with visions of the flotilla invading alone!. The destroyer USS Forrest went out. It took all day for a Walrus seaplane search aircraft to locate them, with cloud down to 100 feet (30 m). Two message canisters were dropped; the first fell into the sea, but the ship got the second one and turned round.)
5th Infantry Division	July 9	Utah	Major General Stafford LeRoy Irwin
8th Infantry Division	July 4	Utah	Major General William C. McMahon; Major General Donald A. Stroh (from 12 July)
9th Infantry Division	June 10	Utah	Major General Manton S. Eddy; Major General Louis A. Craig (from 19 August)
28th Infantry Division	July 22	Omaha	Major General Lloyd D. Brown; Brigadier General James E. Wharton (12–13 August); Major General Norman D. Cota (from 14 August)
29th Infantry Division	June 6	Omaha	Major General Charles H. Gerhardt
30th Infantry Division	June 10	Omaha	Major General Leland Hobbs
35th Infantry Division	July 5	Omaha	Major General Paul W. Baade
79th Infantry Division	June 12	Utah	Major General Ira T. Wyche
83rd Infantry Division	June 18	Omaha	Major General Robert C. Macon
90th Infantry Division	June 6	Utah	Brigadier General Jay W. MacKelvie (until early July); Major General Eugene M. Landrum (July); Brigadier General Raymond S. McLain (from 30 July)
2nd Armored Division	June 9	Omaha	Major General Edward H. Brooks
3rd Armored Division	June 23	Omaha ?	Major General Leroy H. Watson; Major General Maurice Rose (from 7 August)
4th Armored Division	July 11	Utah	Major General John S. Wood
5th Armored Division	July 24	Utah	Major General Lunsford E. Oliver
6th Armored Division	July 19	Utah	Major General Robert W. Grow
82nd Airborne Division	June 6	Utah	Major General Matthew Ridgway
101st Airborne Division	June 6	Utah	Major General Maxwell D. Taylor
2nd Ranger Battalion	June 6	Omaha	Lt. Colonel James E. Rudder
5th Ranger Battalion	June 6	Omaha	Lt. Colonel Max F. Schneider
320th Barrage Balloon Battalion	June 6	Omaha and Utah	Lt. Colonel Leon J. Reed

== United Kingdom ==
See also Hastings Overlord: D-Day and the Battle for Normandy

Independent and GHQ brigades included 30th Armoured; 1st Tank Brigade; 4th Armoured; 1st Assault Brigade Royal Engineers; 31st Tank; 34th Tank; 6th Guards Tank Brigade; 27th Armoured (to 9.1944); 33rd Armoured; 2nd Canadian Armoured Brigade; the headquarters of 74th, 76th, 80th, 100th, 101st, 105th, 106th and 107th Anti-Aircraft Brigades; numerous light anti-aircraft (LAA) and HAA regiments; and 56th Infantry Brigade, which joined 49th Division from 20 August 1944.

Unit	Arrival	Beach	Commander
Guards Armoured Division	28 June	Juno?	Major-General Allan H.S. Adair
7th Armoured Division	6/12 June	Gold	Major-General George W.E.J. Erskine
11th Armoured Division	13 June	Juno	Major-General George P.B. Roberts
8th Armoured Brigade	6 June	Gold	Brigadier Bernard Cracroft
27th Armoured Brigade	6 June	Sword	Brigadier G. E. Prior-Palmer
6th Airborne Division	6 June	Orne Bridgehead	Major-General Richard Gale
3rd Infantry Division	6 June	Sword	Major-General Thomas G. Rennie (WIA 13 June); Major-General Lashmer G. Whistler
15th (Scottish) Infantry Division	14 June	?	Major General G.H.A. MacMillan
43rd (Wessex) Infantry Division	24 June	Juno	Major General G.I. Thomas
49th (West Riding) Infantry Division	13 June	Gold	Major General E.H. Barker
50th (Northumbrian) Infantry Division	6 June	Gold	Major General D.A.H. Graham
51st (Highland) Infantry Division	6-7 June	Juno	Major-General D.C. Bullen-Smith; Major-General T.G. Rennie (from 26 July)
53rd (Welsh) Infantry Division	27 June	?	Major General R.K. Ross
59th (Staffordshire) Infantry Division	27 June	?	Major General Lewis Lyne
79th Armoured Division	6 June	Supported Gold, Sword, and Juno	Major-General Percy Hobart
1st Special Service Brigade	6 June	Sword	Brigadier Lord Lovat
4th Special Service Brigade	6 June	Sword, Juno, Gold	Brigadier Bernard W. Leicester

== Canada ==
Unit	Arrival	Beach	Commander
4th Canadian (Armoured) Division	29 July	Juno ?	Major General George Kitching; Major General Harry W. Foster (from 22 August)
2nd Canadian Infantry Division	7 July	Juno	Major General C. Foulkes
3rd Canadian Infantry Division	6 June	Juno	Major General Rodney F.L. Keller
2nd Canadian Armoured Brigade	6 June	Juno	Brigadier Robert A. Wyman
Others
1st Canadian Parachute Battalion (attached to the British 6th Airborne Division)	6 June	Orne Brighead	Lieutenant-Colonel George Bradbrooke

== Free French forces & Fusiliers Marins ==
Unit	Arrival	Commander
2^{e} Division Blindée	1 August	General Philippe Leclerc
Others
Nos 1 and 8 Troop, No. 10 (Inter-Allied) Commando (attached to No. 4 Commando)	6 June	Capitaine de frégate Philippe Kieffer
3^{ème} Bataillon d'Infanterie de l'Air (3^{e} BIA) (3^{ème} Régiment de Chasseurs Parachutistes (3^{e} RCP) from 1 August) / (3rd SAS)	17 July	Capitaine Pierre Château-Jobert
4^{ème} Bataillon d'Infanterie de l'Air (4^{e} BIA) (2^{ème} Régiment de Chasseurs Parachutistes (2^{e} RCP) from 1 August) / (4th SAS)	6 June	Capitaine Pierre-Louis Bourgoin

== Free Polish forces ==
Unit	Arrival	Commander
1st Armoured Division	NLT 7 Aug	Major-General Stanisław Maczek

== Free Belgian forces ==
Unit	Arrival	Commander
1st Belgian Infantry Brigade ( "Brigade Piron")	Between 30 July – 8 August	Colonel Jean-Baptiste Piron

== Free Czechoslovak forces ==
Unit	Arrival	Commander
1st Czechoslovak Independent Armoured Brigade Group	30 August	Major General Alois Liška

== Free Dutch forces ==
Unit	Arrival	Commander
HNLMS Flores	6 Jun	
HNLMS Soemba	6 Jun	
No. 320 (Netherlands) Squadron RAF	6 Jun	
Koninklijke Nederlandse Brigade "Prinses Irene" ("Princess Irene Brigade")	6 Aug	Colonel A. C. de Ruyter van Steveninck

== Free Norwegian forces ==
Approximately 1,950 Norwegian military personnel took part in the Normandy campaign in separate Norwegian units or as part of other Allied units in addition to 45 civilian ships with approximately 1,000 men from Nortraship. The Norwegian units operated under British command and were therefore primarily employed in the Gold, Sword and Juno sectors.

Some of the participating units:

- Air Force
  - 331 Squadron
  - 332 Squadron
- Navy
  - HNoMS Stord S-class destroyer
  - HNoMS Svenner S-class destroyer
  - HNoMS Glaisdale Hunt-class destroyer
  - HNoMS Andenes Flower-class corvette
  - HNoMS Eglantine Flower-class corvette
  - HNoMS Rose Flower-class corvette
  - HNoMS Nordkapp fishery protection vessel
  - Motor Launches No. 128, 213 and 573

== See also ==
- Australian contribution to the Battle of Normandy
