= John C. Raaen Jr. =

U.S. Army major general (born 1922)

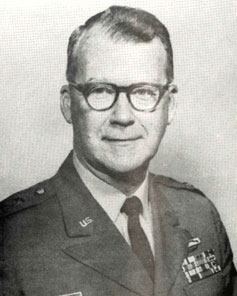
- Major General Raaen
- Born: John Carpenter Raaen, Jr. April 22, 1922 (age 104); Fort Benning, Georgia, U.S.
- Alma mater: West Point (BS); Johns Hopkins University (MA)
- Military career
- Allegiance: United States
- Branch: United States Army
- Service years: 1943–1979
- Rank: Major General
- Service number: O-25486
- Unit: Ordnance Corps
- Commands: HQ Company, 5th Ranger Battalion; 83rd Ordnance Battalion; Mobility Equipment Command; Defense Fuel Supply Center
- Conflicts: World War II; Battle of Normandy; Battle of Brittany; Advance to Saar; Korean War; Vietnam War
- Awards: Congressional Gold Medal; Distinguished Service Medal; Silver Star; Legion of Merit (4); Bronze Star with Combat "V" (2)

John Carpenter Raaen Jr. (born April 22, 1922) is a retired American military officer who served in the United States Army, reaching the rank of major general. He is a decorated combat veteran of World War II, the Korean War, and the Vietnam War. He is best known for his role in the D-Day landings on Omaha Beach, as a company commander in the 5th Ranger Infantry Battalion, for which he received the Silver Star. Subsequently, he was awarded two Bronze Star Medals for valor for his heroic actions in the Brittany campaign. Raaen then served in senior ordnance roles during the Korean and Vietnam Wars, earning numerous awards, including four Legion of Merit medals in Vietnam. For his notable contributions and meritorious service, as Commanding General, Defense Fuel Supply Center, from 1976 to 1979, he was awarded the Army Distinguished Service Medal.

During his 36-year career, Raaen became a key figure in United States Army Ordnance Corps, notably as the driving force behind the Single Manager for Conventional Ammunition (SMCA) system, which revolutionized ammunition management across the military and is still in use today. Raaen is the author of Intact, a memoir of his World War II experience. As of 2025, Raaen is the last surviving United States Army Rangers officer who participated in the initial assault on Omaha Beach, and is among the oldest surviving U.S. veterans of the Battle of Normandy. On September 17, 2025, Raaen was awarded the Congressional Gold Medal.

== Life and career ==
=== Early life and education ===
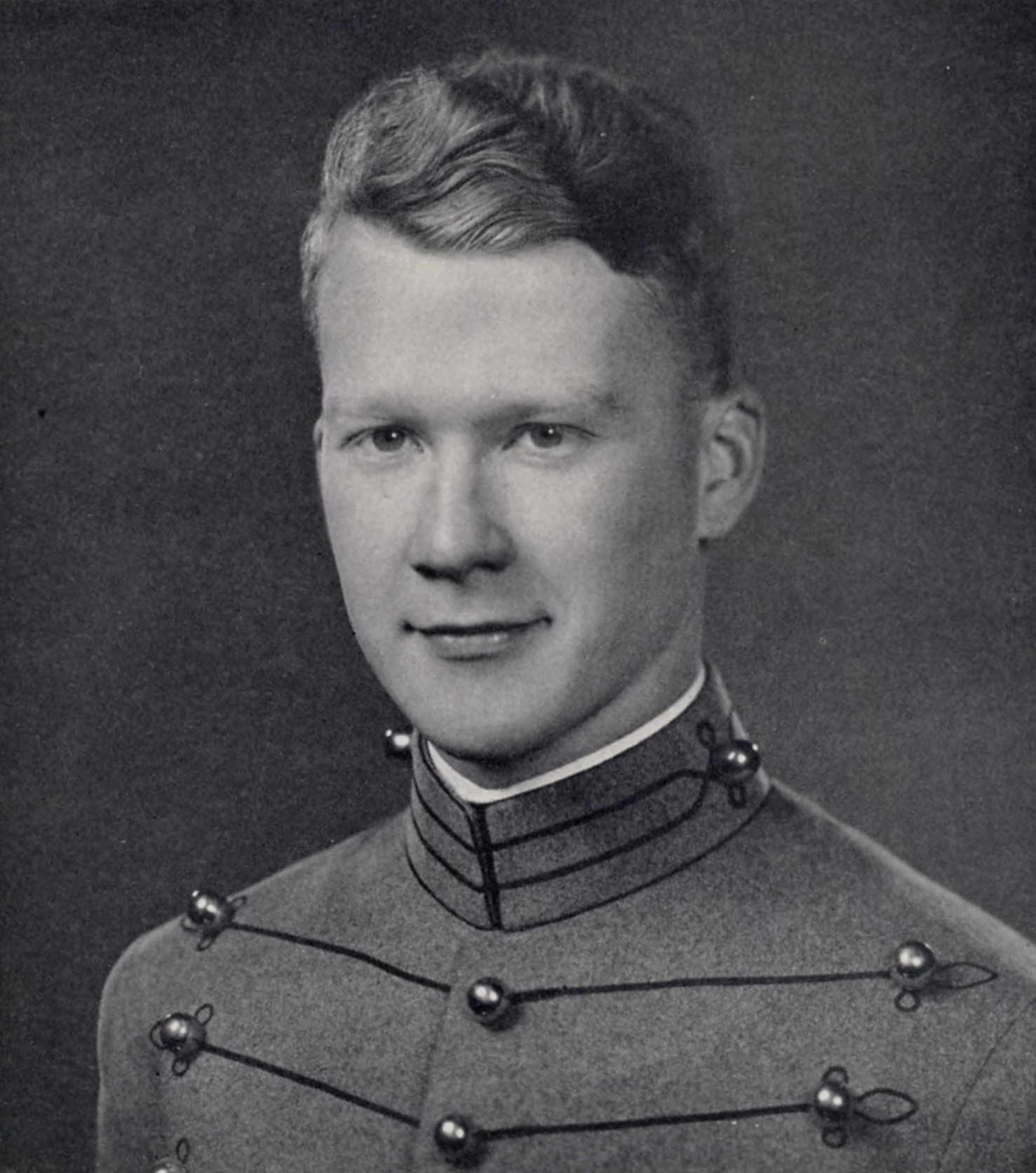
Raaen while attending the United States Military Academy c. 1943

John Carpenter Raaen Jr. was born on April 22, 1922, at Fort Benning, Georgia, to Alexandra (née Hoffman) and Colonel John Carpenter "Jack" Raaen. His father was a 1919 graduate of United States Military Academy, who served for over 20 years in the ordnance field; as such, Raaen developed an interest in his father's service. He spent much of his teenage years at Frankford Arsenal, where he worked in the Pitman Laboratory, (Note: The Pitman Laboratory was established in 1892 by then Captain John T. Pitman Jr., initially to study and develop smokeless powders.) learning about ammunition testing, including testing the core materials for armor-piercing ammunition.

Growing up in a military family and living on various Army posts, Raaen was exposed to military life and was well acquainted with senior Army leaders who later played critical roles in World War II, including Dwight D. Eisenhower and Omar Bradley. (Note: "I knew Eisenhower. I knew Bradley. I even double-dated with Bradley's daughter. Johnny Eisenhower was a friend of mine from junior high school....I knew their fathers when they were lieutenants...It was a very, very useful growing-up period living on Army posts, because you did meet all these people when they were lieutenants, when they were captains." —John Raaen (2023)) According to Raaen, being acquainted with high-ranking officers was helpful in his military career, as he was not intimidated by them. (Note: "Because of the nature of the interwar army, I knew the Eisenhowers, the Cotas, the Gerhardts, the Bradleys, and many others as family friends. I played with officers’ kids. I dated their daughters. When Dad was stationed at the Military Academy in the late 1920s, he and my mother would invite cadets for Sundays.... Later I realized what an advantage it was to have known these men from boyhood. I didn’t quake in my boots around them, although it could be awkward. In uniform, I once addressed a lieutenant general by his first name; he gave me a hard look but replied, “What is it, John?” —John Raaen (2016))

Raaen attended the United States Military Academy, receiving an appointment in 1939 at the age of 17. At West Point, he excelled in his academic and leadership roles, serving as Cadet Captain and Regimental Supply Officer. With the entry of the United States into World War II, the training was shortened by several months, moving the class of 1943's graduation from June to January. Raaen earned a Bachelor of Science in Engineering and was commissioned as a second lieutenant in the United States Army Corps of Engineers. His engineering studies would prove useful in battlefield leadership roles, especially during complex operations involving terrain analysis and demolition. After World War II, he pursued graduate studies in nuclear physics, earning a master of arts degree from Johns Hopkins University in 1951.

=== World War II ===
In 1943, Raaen volunteered for and was selected to join the newly formed 5th Ranger Infantry Battalion. The battalion underwent intensive amphibious and commando training in Florida, England, and Scotland in preparation for the Allied invasion of Normandy.

On June 6, 1944, D-Day, the 2nd and 5th Rangers began their landings on Omaha Beach in the early morning. They were originally intended to land at Vierville, but were warned off by landing control due to 95% casualties at Vierville. They were diverted to Dog White beach, where their group from the 2nd Rangers landed, and had 50% casualties. Lieutenant Colonel Schneider, commander of the 5th Rangers, observing the brutal assault, diverted their landing to the east, where they found breakwaters that provided protective barriers. The 5th Rangers, with then-Captain Raaen in command of HQ company, landed intact at 0750 at Les Moulins. (Note: The first and second waves of Rangers met with high casualties. Raaen attributes the successful third wave landing of "C" force, in part, to the later landing time, with higher tide, which meant less beach to traverse. The earliest landings in the first wave had 250 yards of beach to traverse under enemy fire. Raaem and his men had only 50 yards of beach to cross.) In the face of intense German fire, they moved inland, and up the steep bluffs.

As they advanced to Pointe du Hoc to relieve the 2nd Rangers, the 5th Rangers met with German sniper fire, changed direction, and reached Vierville at noon. They were ordered to stay and hold the ground they had taken. The following day, Raaen led a relief force to Pointe du Hoc, took command of the position, and organized its defense from nearby St. Pierre du Mont. On June 20, 1944, he was awarded the Silver Star Medal for his leadership and bravery during the D-Day landings. His citation reads:

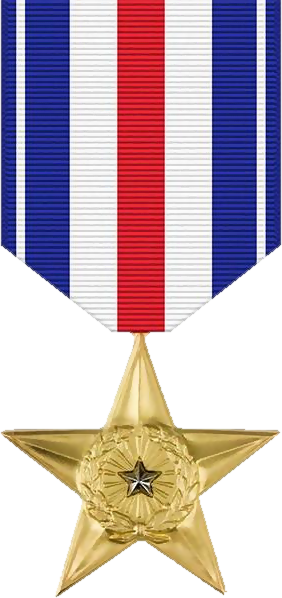

Headquarters, V Corps, General Orders No. 2A (June 20, 1944)

The President of the United States of America, authorized by Act of Congress July 9, 1918, takes pleasure in presenting the Silver Star to Captain (Corps of Engineers) John Carpenter Raaen, Jr. (ASN: 0-25486), United States Army, for gallantry in action while serving with the 5th Ranger Infantry Battalion (Separate), FIFTH U.S. Army Corps, in action against the enemy on the coast of Normandy, France, on June 6, 1944. The gallant actions and dedicated devotion to duty demonstrated by Captain Raaen, without regard for his own life, were in keeping with the highest traditions of military service and reflect great credit upon himself and the United States Army.

Raaen remained with the 5th Ranger Battalion after Normandy, in combat through the Brittany campaign across France, earning two Bronze Star Medals for valor for his actions. When they reached the Saar Valley, he was severely wounded; on December 22, 1944, he was thrown from his jeep and suffered a broken hip and leg. He was evacuated and returned to the States in February 1945.

Raaen was officially tasked with writing the after-action report for his unit for the invasion month, as well as writing recommendations for medals for deserving soldiers who had taken part in the invasion.

=== Post–World War II ===
After returning to the United States and recuperating from his injuries, in July 1945, he was assigned as an instructor in ordnance at West Point, where he taught courses on ammunition, explosives, and ballistics. In 1947, he formally transferred to the Ordnance Corps and began focusing on technical and logistical areas of military operations, specifically the design and testing of munitions, propellants, and weapons systems. He contributed significantly to the development of new ammunition designs, including improvements to armor-piercing ammunition and the invention of methods to enhance bullet penetration. In 1951, he earned a Master of Arts in Nuclear Physics from Johns Hopkins University, further specializing in weapons development and nuclear logistics.

From 1955 to 1956, Raaen was stationed in Korea, initially serving as executive officer of the ordnance section of the Eighth Army. In this role, he worked to improve the delivery of spare parts and new equipment to units in the field. He was later appointed commander of the 83rd Ordnance Battalion, where he undertook efforts to restructure the ammunition stock control system. Upon returning to the United States in 1957, Raaen took on several key roles in ordnance management and research. In 1957, he began serving on the Ordnance Board at Aberdeen Proving Ground (APG), Maryland, overseeing ordnance operations at various U.S. Army facilities. In 1959, he moved to Germantown, Maryland to serve on the Military Liaison Committee to the Atomic Energy Commission, which addressed technical research related to artillery warheads and nuclear arming devices.

Between 1963 and 1965, Raaen served with the Berlin Brigade in West Berlin, Germany, first as ordnance officer and later as deputy chief of staff for personnel (G-1). In 1965, he assumed command of the U.S. Army Ammunition Depot at Miesau, Germany. Later that year, Raaen returned to the United States to take charge of the U.S. Army Research Office in Durham, North Carolina. In this role, he was responsible for supervising research programs conducted by civilian scientists and academic institutions under Army sponsorship. From 1967 to 1969, he commanded the Ballistic Research Laboratories, the Human Engineering Laboratories, and the Coating and Chemical Laboratory at APG. During his tenure, these facilities were consolidated with additional organizations to form the Aberdeen Research and Development Center.

=== Vietnam War and retirement ===
In 1969, Raaen was assigned to Headquarters, United States Army Vietnam (USARV), where he served as chief of the G-4 section's ammunition division and later as deputy assistant chief of staff, G-4. He was responsible for managing the supply of ammunition and other critical materials to combat forces, a task that was particularly challenging due to frequent shortages and logistical hurdles. His efforts in managing complex wartime logistics and improving ammunition handling systems earned him multiple commendations. He was awarded four Legions of Merit for his "exceptionally meritorious conduct in the performance of outstanding services to the Government of the United States":

- 1st award: Action date—1967 to 1969, Colonel in the Corps of Engineers
- 2nd award: Action date—1969, Colonel in the Corps of Engineers with Headquarters, Military Assistance Command, Vietnam; awarded a Bronze Oak Leaf Cluster in lieu of a Second Award of the Legion of Merit
- 3rd award: Action date—1970 to 1971, Brigadier General, Director, Ammunition Ordnance Logistics, Department of the Army; awarded a Second Bronze Oak Leaf Cluster in lieu of a Third Award of the Legion of Merit
- 4th award: Action date—1971 to 1972, Major General, Commanding General, Mobility Equipment Command; awarded a Third Bronze Oak Leaf Cluster in lieu of a Fourth Award of the Legion of Merit

In the 1970s, Raaen took command of several major ordnance commands, including the Mobility Equipment Command in St. Louis (1971) and the U.S. Army Weapons Command at the Rock Island Arsenal (1972). In 1973, he took command of the U.S. Army Armament Command (ARMCOM), (Note: ARMCOM was formed in September 1973 from the merger of U.S. Army Munitions Command (MUCOM) and the U.S. Army Weapon Command. ARMCOM combined the R&D, acquisition, and sustainment functions for weapons and ammunition into one command. ARMCOM lasted four years before it was decided to separate the R&D and acquisition/sustainment functions.) where he oversaw the development and management of ammunition and weaponry across the Army. His leadership at ARMCOM led to the consolidation of multiple research and development labs into the Aberdeen Research and Development Center (ARDC), which streamlined and advanced the Army's ordnance and ammunition research efforts. In 1975, he became the Executive Deputy Director of the Defense Supply Agency in Alexandria, Virginia. The next year, Raaen took command of the Defense Fuel Supply Center in Washington, D.C., where he oversaw critical supply operations across the Department of Defense. After 36 years of dedicated service, he retired in 1979 at the rank of Major General. In retirement, he remained active in veterans' affairs and historical commemorations, especially those related to the Battle of Normandy.

During his career, Raaen played a pivotal role in establishing the Joint Munitions & Lethality Life Cycle Management Command (JM&L LCMC), ensuring that the Army maintained a competitive edge in developing cutting-edge munitions and weapons systems. Raaen also played a key role in the establishment of the Single Manager for Conventional Ammunition (SMCA) system, a revolutionary structure that centralized the management of ammunition across all branches of the U.S. military. This system, which remains in place today, improved the efficiency and effectiveness of ammunition supply chains.

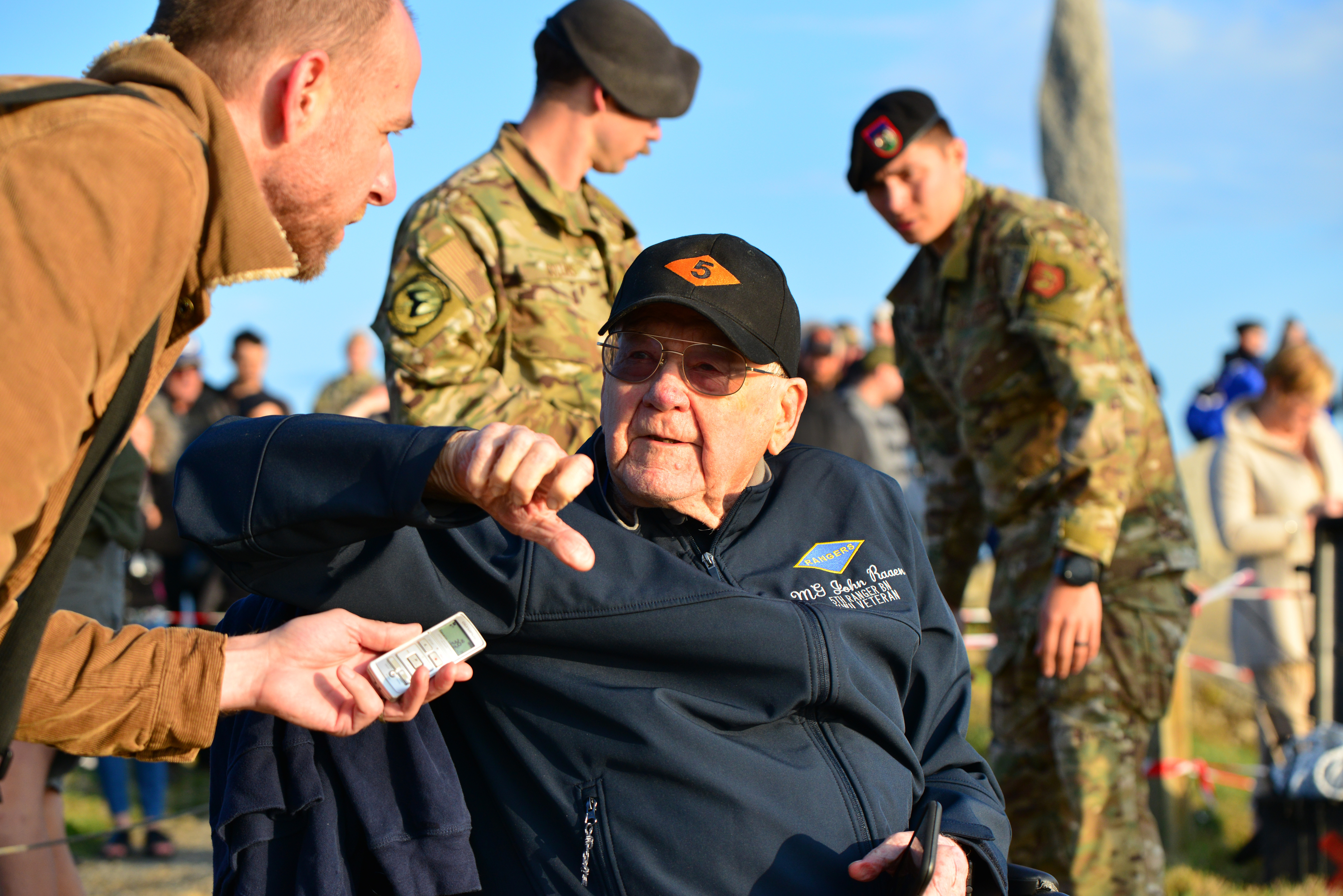
Raaen talks to the French press at the Pointe du Hoc, Omaha Beach reenactment, as part of D-Day 75, June 5, 2019.

Following his retirement from the Army, Raaen's legacy continued to be honored within the U.S. Army. In recognition of his pioneering work in ammunition and ordnance management. He was inducted into the U.S. Army Ordnance Corps Hall of Fame in 2009 and the Ammunition Hall of Fame in 2014. Raaen's contributions to military logistics, ordnance, and munitions continue to serve as a model for modern Army operations. In 2022, 78 years after D-Day, the Army Rangers were given a Congressional Gold Medal for "their extraordinary service during World War II". At the time, Raaen was one of only 13 of the nearly 7,000 Rangers who served in World War II who were still living.

In 2012, he published his memoir, Intact: A First-Hand Account of the D-Day Invasion from a Fifth Rangers Company Commander, offering detailed insights into the Omaha Beach landing and Ranger operations during the Normandy invasion. As of April 22, 2025, Raaen resides in Central Florida and is 103 years old. According to the American Veterans Center, he is the last surviving U.S. Army Ranger officer from the first wave of D-Day landings on Omaha Beach.

== Awards and decorations ==
Major General Raaen's military awards and decorations include:

- Combat Infantryman Badge
- Army Staff Identification Badge
- Army Distinguished Service Medal
- Silver Star Medal
- Legion of Merit with 3 bronze oak leaf clusters
- Bronze Star Medal with Combat "V" device and 1 oak leaf cluster
- Army Commendation Medal
- American Defense Service Medal
- European-African-Middle Eastern Campaign Medal with 3 Service stars
- American Campaign Medal
- World War II Victory Medal
- National Defense Service Medal with Service star
- Army of Occupation Medal with clasp
- Vietnam Service Medal with 3 Service stars
- Vietnam Campaign Medal
- Presidential Unit Citation
- Meritorious Unit Commendation

On September 17, 2025, Raaen received the Congressional Gold Medal, the oldest and joint-highest civilian award in the United States. (Note: The Congressional Gold Medal and the Presidential Medal of Freedom are jointly the highest awards presented by the United States government to a civilian.) The ceremony took place at The Mayflower at Winter Park, where Raaen is a resident.
