= Raaen =

Raaen is a surname. Notable people with the surname include:

- Aagot Raaen (1873–1957), American author and educator
- Albert Raaen (1887–1971), Norwegian politician
- Reidar Raaen (1897–1964), Norwegian cyclist
- John C. Raaen Jr. (born 1922), American military officer
