= Provisional Ranger Group =

U.S. Army Rangers in World War II

The Provisional Ranger Group was a provisional regiment of U.S. Army Rangers that was formed for the D-Day landings in Normandy, France, in World War II.

== Formation ==
On 2 April 1944, two elite American units, the 2nd Ranger Battalion and the 5th Ranger Battalion were ordered to make their way to the U.S. Assault Training Center in Braunton, England. When the two battalions arrived, the men learned that the commander of the 5th Battalion had been reassigned.

Lieutenant Colonel Max Schneider took command of the unit. Schneider and Lieutenant Colonel James Earl Rudder, the commander of the 2nd Battalion, were soon briefed on the upcoming mission.

On 5 June 1944, the Provisional Ranger Group, would take part in the amphibious landings in Normandy. Force A, commanded by Rudder, would capture Pointe du Hoc, destroy the guns, and seize a German observation post.

Force B, commanded by Captain Ralph E. Goranson, would land on Omaha Dog Green Beach. Force C, commanded by Schneider, would join Force A at the Pointe if Rudder signaled that his men had scaled the cliffs there. If not, Force C would land at Omaha Beach.

== Units and commanders ==
- Provisional Ranger Group (Provisional)-Lieutenant Colonel James Rudder, C.O., Major Richard Sullivan, X.O.
  - Force A-Lieutenant Colonel James Rudder, C.O.
    - Company D, 2nd Ranger Battalion
    - Company E, 2nd Ranger Battalion
    - Company F, 2nd Ranger Battalion
    - Company Headquarters, 2nd Ranger Battalion
  - Force B-Captain Ralph Goranson, C.O.
    - Company C, 2nd Ranger Battalion
  - Force C-Lieutenant Colonel Max Schneider, C.O.
    - Company A, 2nd Ranger Battalion
    - Company B, 2nd Ranger Battalion
    - Company A, 5th Ranger Battalion
    - Company B, 5th Ranger Battalion
    - Company C, 5th Ranger Battalion
    - Company D, 5th Ranger Battalion
    - Company E, 5th Ranger Battalion
    - Company F, 5th Ranger Battalion

== Combat missions ==
When the D-Day landings were rescheduled for 5 June, the Rangers and all the rest of the Allied troops ready for combat had to wait. 5 June was a miserable day with severe storms. That night, 5 June, General Dwight D. Eisenhower, the Supreme Allied Commander, ordered the landings to begin on the morning of 6 June. Before 5:00 A.M. on the morning of 6 June, the men of the Provisional Ranger Group got into their landing crafts and prepared for battle. At 6:36 am, Company A of the 116th Infantry Regiment landed on Omaha Dog Green, along with Company B of the 743rd Tank Battalion. Omaha Dog Green soon became the opposite of what the planners expected. Men and tanks were blasted by artillery and machine-gun fire. When Captain Goranson's C Company (Force B) of the 2nd Rangers landed, many of the men preceding them in the landings lay dead or maimed. Almost immediately, the first Rangers out of each boat were mowed down. The men following them flung themselves over the sides of the crafts, hoping to swim ashore. Some men drowned and even more were shot to death by the German guns above. The survivors swam or waded ashore and got into the battle.

Near Pointe du Hoc, the landing craft flotilla carrying Force A made a wrong turn. By the time the force got back on track, Colonel Rudder knew that he would never be able to signal Force C by 7:00. That meant no reinforcements. Companies D, E, and F of the 2nd would have to do their best without help until Force C could get across four miles of enemy territory and join up with them. When the landing crafts hit a narrow, pebbled beach near a cliff, German machine-gunners opened up on the Rangers. Some of them were killed, but the rest of them got to the bottom of the cliff and used miniature rockets to fire grappling ropes up to the top. Once the hooks caught on barbed wire or bushes, the Rangers climbed up. Some Germans unhooked the ropes and sent the men on them plummeting to their deaths. However, Rudder and most of his men reached the top of the cliff and engaged in a battle with a force of Germans in bunkers. Tossing grenades and blasting their way into the bunkers, Rudder's Rangers killed many Germans but found wooden posts instead of heavy artillery inside. The guns had been moved away to a more secure location some months before D-day to facilitate the installation of casemented deck guns. Some of the Rangers were able to locate a battery of mobile guns inland and destroy them. The men at the cliff set up a makeshift headquarters and prepared for a counterattack. Throughout their battle for Pointe du Hoc, the Rangers were under fire from the nearby coastal gun battery at Maisy. (Maisy was a Rangers objective – taken on 9 June 1944).

Colonel Schneider, having not received a signal indicating the capture of Pointe du Hoc because of the timing, decided to bring his men ashore on Omaha Dog Green. When they came ashore, the men of Force C found their comrades of Force B engaged in a terrible firefight. As the men, from both the 2nd and 5th Battalions but predominantly from the latter, started fighting, Brigadier General Norman Cota, the assistant division commander of the 29th Infantry Division, arrived. Leading the men forward, he noticed several men from the 5th Ranger Battalion shooting at the Germans. After finding out what unit they were from, he shouted, "Rangers, lead the way!" That phrase is the Rangers' official motto.

After Forces B and C got inland, they made their way to the Pointe du Hoc. When they came within sight of Force A's headquarters, both groups mistook each other for the enemy. Some men from the 5th Battalion blasted the little headquarters. One wall fell away and Rudder, already wounded, found himself on the ground again. Some men of the 2nd Battalion identified themselves and the Provisional Ranger Group joined up and moved inland.

The 2nd and 5th Ranger Battalions went back to their original command structure and distinguished themselves during the European Campaign. James Rudder eventually became a major general and President of Texas A&M. Major Sullivan was given the Distinguished Service Cross for the breakout at Omaha Beach, the relief of Pointe du Hoc and the successful assault on the Maisy Batteries. Max Schneider became a respected combat leader and eventually became a full colonel. He was killed in the Korean War.

== On film ==
A portion of the 1962 war film The Longest Day is devoted to the Pointe du Hoc landings. The acclaimed 1998 film Saving Private Ryan opens with a realistic view of Force C's assault at Omaha Dog Green.

== Sources ==
- Rangers in World War II-by Robert Black
- World War II Heroes-by Allan Zullo
- The Longest Day-by Cornelius Ryan
