= Elton Younger =

British Army general

Major-General Elton Younger DSO OBE
- Born: 4 May 1919
- Died: 5 July 2010 (aged 91)
- Spouse: Diana Lanyon

Major-General Allan Elton Younger DSO OBE (4 May 1919 – 5 July 2010), known to friends as Tony Younger, was a British Army officer and author, Colonel Commandant of the Royal Engineers from 1974 to 1979.

After returning to civilian life, he was Director-General of the Royal United Services Institute for Defence Studies.

== Background ==
Younger's family is a branch of the Younger's Brewery family of Edinburgh, founded by his ancestor William Younger (1733-1769). It also has a long military tradition, and his grandfather was Colonel John Younger, Royal Artillery. He was a maternal first cousin of the actor, John Le Mesurier Halliley.

== Early life ==
Younger was the son of Brigadier Arthur Allan Shakespear Younger DSO and his wife Marjorie Rhoda Halliley. He was educated at Gresham's School and as a gentleman cadet at the Royal Military Academy, Woolwich, from where he was commissioned into the Royal Engineers as a second lieutenant on 26 January 1939. While at the Academy, he had passed the entrance examination for the University of Cambridge, and was expecting to join the university in October 1939, but shortly before that war broke out, and his further education had to be deferred. After the war, he went up to Christ's College, Cambridge, and graduated BA and MA (by seniority).

== Career ==
In 1940, Younger saw active service with the British Expeditionary Force in France and Belgium. As the Germans speedily advanced, his work was in blowing up bridges. He returned to England as part of the Dunkirk evacuation of May to June 1940.

In 1942, Younger took part in trials on the Scottish island of Gruinard to test the potential of anthrax as a weapon. He later said that its lethality compared with chemical weapons was like the difference between TNT and a nuclear bomb.

In 1943, Younger was given command of 26 Assault Squadron, a unit with bridge-laying and other specialist tasks, with instructions to prepare to lead the 7th Brigade ashore on D-Day. He had a large part in modifying the Royal Engineers Assault Vehicle, or AVRE, into a suitable landing craft, and practiced by invading the Isle of Wight. At H-Hour on 6 June 1944, shortly before the Normandy landings, Younger returned to France and commanded a squadron of sappers, the first armoured unit to land. Coming ashore near Courseulles, he was wounded and lost the hearing in one ear, so was returned to Portsmouth, but was flown back into the action in time to assist with the crossing of the Rhine. He went on to see further action in France, Holland, and Germany, until the end of the war in 1945. In August 1944, while a Captain with the temporary rank of Major, he was awarded the Distinguished Service Order.

After the war, Younger passed the Staff College. He was in Burma, 1946–1947, and Malaya, in 1948, at the beginning of the Emergency. He then returned for a two-year course at Christ’s College, Cambridge, reading Mechanical Science.

Younger took part in the Korean War between 1950 and 1951, being given command of 55 Field Squadron, Royal Engineers. In 1952, the United States awarded him the Silver Star. He attended and graduated from the United States Army Command and General Staff College.

From 1954 to 1957, Younger was posted as an instructor at Sandhurst and was promoted to Lieutenant-Colonel in 1959. For two years from 1960 he commanded 36 Corps Engineer Regiment, in the United Kingdom and Kenya. In May 1962 he was appointed as an Officer of the Order of the British Empire. He was the Senior Army Member of the Directing Staff at the Royal College of Defence Studies from 1972 to 1975.

Between 1976 and 1978, Younger was Director-General of the Royal United Services Institute for Defence Studies.

== Personal life ==
In 1942, Younger married Diana Lanyon, and they had three daughters. He died on 5 July 2010.

== Publications ==
- Blowing Our Bridges: A Memoir from Dunkirk to Korea via Normandy (Leo Cooper Ltd, 2004) ISBN 1-84415-051-8
- "Self-training for Senior Officers" in Military Review: Professional Journal of the US Army, August 1966, 3–11

== Honours ==
- Distinguished Service Order, 1944
- Silver Star (U.S. decoration), 1952
- Officer of the Order of the British Empire, 1969
- Colonel Commandant, Corps of Royal Engineers, 15 April 1974
