= Albert Eon =

WWII military resistance leader

Albert Eon (29 November 1894 – 20 May 1970) was a head of the military resistance in Brittany, north-west France in World War II and developer of the Specialized Airborne of France.

== Formative years ==
Albert Marie Eon was born on 29 November 1894 in Seine-et-Oise. Eon initially studied at the La Flèche and Special Military Schools. Eon was assigned from 1920 to 1921 to the occupation troops of Upper Silesia.

== Early military training ==
By 30 June 1921, as a captain, he had trained at the Artillery School. By 31 October 1926, Eon was transferred to the École Supérieure De Guerre and then on to a command in Morocco. Eon also spent time with the Red Army in Russia around July 1936 being able to speak Russian. By 1936, Eon was instructor at the Liaison and Signals School.

== World War Two ==
=== 8th Army ===
With general mobilization in September 1939, Eon served with the 8th Army until being captured in June 1940. By 22 July 1940, Eon had however escaped.

=== 64th Artillery Regiment ===
Eon was reassigned to North Africa to command the 64th Artillery Regiment and promoted to lieutenant-colonel and finally colonel by 25 December 1942.

=== Intelligence gathering ===
Eon also acted as an agent for the Polish PSW-AFR network. He provided information on defence of the Moroccan coast to the Allied High Command. After leaving Morocco, Eon travelled by slow boat to London and on 8 April 1944, he was directed to the Central Bureau of Intelligence and Operations (BCRA), where Eon was assigned to the Special Missions Parachute Corps with an assimilation rank of lieutenant-colonel. On 5 July 1944, General Marie-Pierre Koenig, Commander-in-Chief of the French Forces of the Interior (FFI), appointed Eon commander of the FFI in Brittany with an objective "to place under his authority all resistance forces of Brittany", to coordinate their actions with Americans forces arriving in the region. On the night of 4 August 1944, Eon with 30 other officers were parachuted near Kerien, Brittany. Eon made contact with the American 3rd Army and assisted in the liberation of the Côtes-du-Nord and the Brest pocket.

== Development of the Specialized Airborne ==
By 30 November 1944, Eon was assigned to the General Directorate of Studies and Research (DGER) to develop a replacement for the BCRA through the implementation of a special airborne force by taking the leaning they had received from similar Allied schools. Even though large amounts of such personnel were now being demobilized as hostilities ended in France, the new military dispensation saw a rationale for retaining an ability for specialized airborne who could be used to penetrate behind future enemy lines. Eon was promoted to Brigadier-General on 20 May 1946 developed proposals for paratroopers on special missions and opened several training centres in this regard. By 1947 the SDECE (External documentation and counter-espionage service) would source personnel in for its service.

By 1947 Eon, was given command of the military area of Albi. After a mission in the Far East in 1951–1952, Eon retired from the Army. Eon had become a Grand Officer of the Legion of Honor.

== Passing ==
Major General Éon died on 20 May 1970, in Casablanca.
