= Lloyd D. Brown =

United States Army general

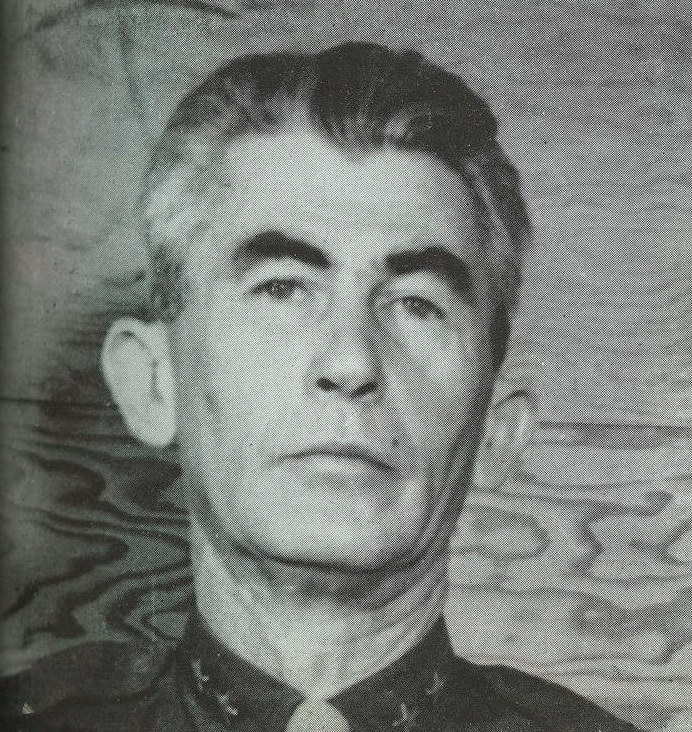
- Born: July 28, 1892; Sharon, Georgia, U.S.
- Died: February 17, 1950 (aged 57); Washington, Georgia, U.S.
- Military career
- Allegiance: United States
- Branch: United States Army
- Service years: 1917–1948
- Rank: Major General
- Service number: 0-5549
- Unit: Infantry Branch
- Commands: 28th Infantry Division
- Conflicts: World War I World War II
- Awards: Silver Star; Legion of Merit

Major General Lloyd Davidson Brown (July 28, 1892 – February 17, 1950) was a senior United States Army officer who served in both World War I and World War II. During the latter, he commanded the 28th Infantry Division, including during the Battle of Normandy in mid-1944.

== Early life ==
Lloyd Davidson Brown was born in Sharon, Georgia, on July 28, 1892. He graduated from Augusta's Academy of Richmond County in 1908, and the University of Georgia in 1912. He was a member of Phi Delta Theta and Phi Beta Kappa, and after graduating was employed as an instructor at Georgia Military Academy.

In 1917, the same year of the American entry into World War I, Brown received his commission in the United States Army as a second lieutenant in the Infantry Branch, and was originally assigned to the 26th Infantry Regiment. During the war he served on the Western Front as a company commander of 'G' Company, 2nd Battalion, 61st Infantry Regiment, part of the 5th Division of the American Expeditionary Forces (AEF).

== Post-World War I ==
With the war over due to the Armistice with Germany in November 1918, Brown's post-war assignments included Professor of Military Science at Riverside Military Academy in Gainesville, Georgia, and postings as a company commander and regimental Plans, Operations and Training (S3) staff officer for the 45th Infantry Regiment in the Philippines.

He graduated from the Infantry Officer Course in 1923, the Infantry Advanced Course in 1928, and the U.S. Army Command and General Staff College in 1930.

In the late 1930s he served on the staff of the National Guard Bureau, and was an instructor and advisor for the Illinois Army National Guard's 131st Infantry Regiment. On July 1, 1940, he was promoted to lieutenant colonel.

== World War II ==
Brown served on the War Department staff at the start of the American entry into World War II, and subsequently served as Assistant Chief of Staff for Operations and Training (G3) at Headquarters, Army Ground Forces. He was promoted to the rank of colonel in the Army of the United States (AUS) on December 12, 1941. During the U.S. Army's huge wartime expansion he was accused of encouraging Regular Army officers to have senior officers of the National Guard replaced by writing negative performance evaluations on them, enabling Regular Army officers to fill these positions and receive promotions and command assignments.

In mid-1942 he became the assistant division commander (ADC) of the 102nd Infantry Division after receiving another promotion, this time to brigadier general (AUS), on May 24, 1942.

He remained in this position until January 1943 when he was reassigned to be the new commanding general (CG) of the 28th Infantry Division, an Army National Guard formation. He was taking over from Major General Omar Bradley, who had been sent to the North African Theater of Operations to be the personal representative of General Dwight D. Eisenhower, the Supreme Allied Commander. Brown received promotion to major general (AUS) on March 15, 1943. He led the division during training in the United States and left for the United Kingdom in October 1943, arriving in South Wales soon afterwards. The division trained there until late July 1944 when it was sent to Northern France to take part in the Allied invasion of Normandy, and saw its first combat in Operation Cobra, an attempt to break out of the Normandy beachhead and end the temporary stalemate. He served until being relieved on August 12 over concerns that his division was not progressing rapidly enough against German defenses.

Brown's performance and subsequent reputation were mixed. Major General Charles H. Corlett, then commanding the XIX Corps, thought Brown needed leave for medical reasons because he was sick and "rundown." One of Brown's battalion commanders thought Brown was not up to the challenge of commanding large units in combat and described him as "frantic." Bradley, now a lieutenant general, commanding the U.S. 12th Army Group, and Eisenhower believed Brown was personally brave, but not an inspirational leader, and that his soldiers under-performed as a result. Unlike several other division commanders who were relieved and later received second opportunities at division command, such as Terry Allen and Orlando Ward, in Brown's case Eisenhower recommended to General George C. Marshall, the U.S. Army Chief of Staff, that Brown not be given another such assignment, and Marshall concurred. Brown was replaced by James Edward Wharton, who was killed by a sniper while visiting his front line units soon after he took command. Wharton, in turn, was replaced by Brigadier General Norman Cota, who had distinguished himself under fire on D-Day and was highly regarded by his superiors.

Brown reverted to his permanent rank of colonel and served in various staff assignments, including Director of Training at the U.S. Army Infantry School, until retiring from the army on 31 December 1948. Upon retirement, he was promoted to major general on the retired list.

== Death and burial ==
Brown died in Washington, Georgia, on February 17, 1950, and was buried at Resthaven Cemetery in Washington.

== Legacy ==
His home in Washington, Georgia, the Leitner-Norris Home, was built circa 1814. It is still a privately owned residence, and a local historic landmark.

Lloyd Brown Hall at Fort Benning was named for him.

== Awards ==
- Silver Star
- Legion of Merit
- World War I Victory Medal with four campaign clasps
- American Defense Service Medal
- American Campaign Medal
- European-African-Middle Eastern Campaign Medal with one campaign star
- World War II Victory Medal

== Dates of rank ==
- 2nd Lieutenant (Regular Army) - 5 June 1917
- 1st Lieutenant (Regular Army) - 5 June 1917
- Captain (Temporary) - 5 August 1917
- Captain (Regular Army) - 18 June 1920
- Major (Regular Army) - 1 June 1934
- Lieutenant Colonel (Regular Army) - 1 July 1940
- Colonel (Army of the United States) - 11 December 1941
- Brigadier General (Army of the United States) - 24 May 1942
- Major General (Army of the United States) - 15 March 1943
- Colonel (Army of the United States) - 19 August 1944
- Colonel (Regular Army) - 25 April 1947
- Major General (Retired List) - 31 December 1948

== Family ==
Lloyd Brown's first wife was Benita Allen (1895–1925), whom he married in 1919. In 1929 he married Katherine Green Brown (1895–1981).

With his first wife he had a son, Allen Davidson Brown (1925–2001).

Military offices
Preceded by Omar N. Bradley	Commanding General 28th Infantry Division; 1943–1944	Succeeded by James E. Wharton
