= Leroy H. Watson =

United States Army general (1893–1975)

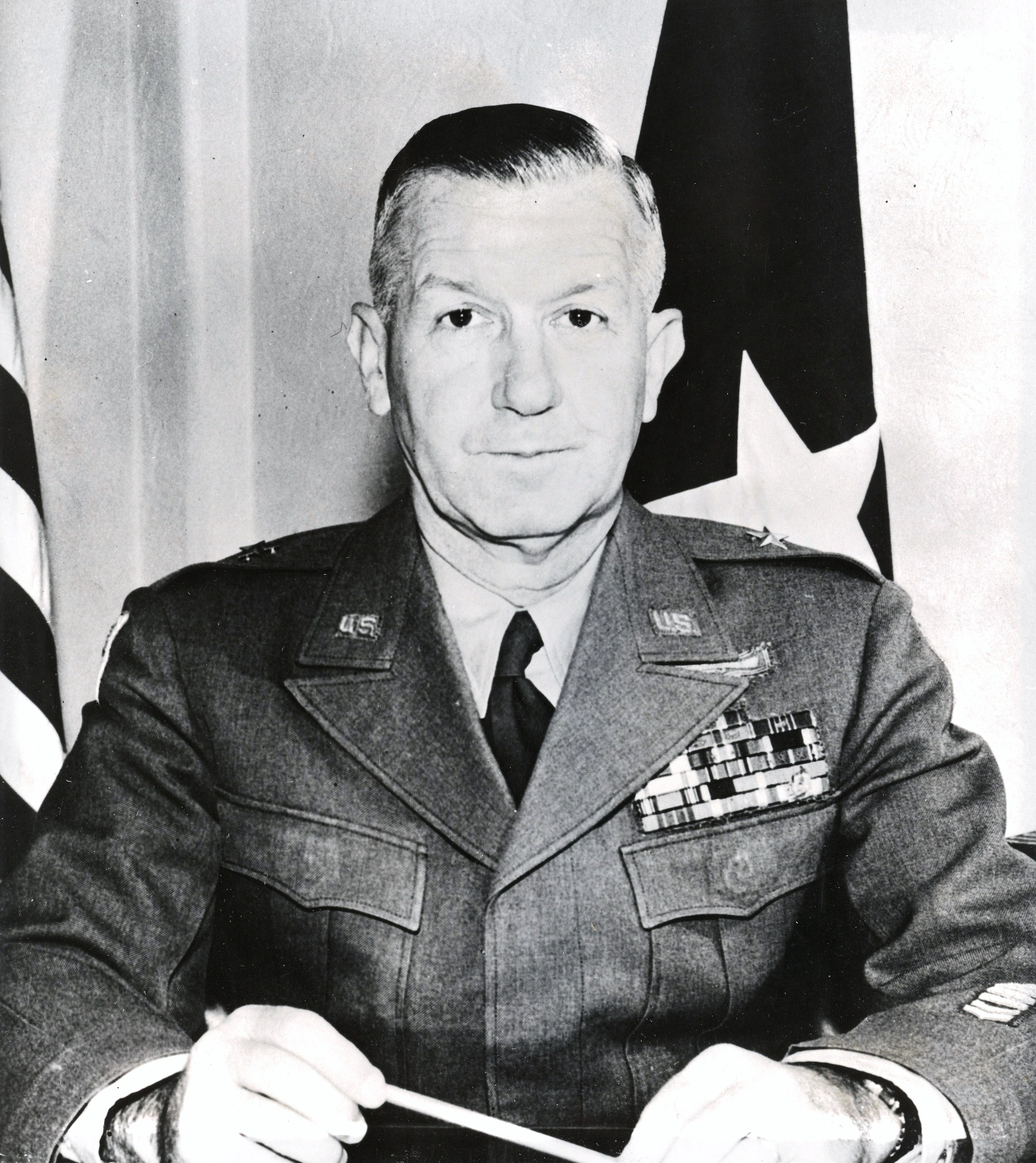
- Watson as commander of the Fort Lewis army post, circa 1950. US Army Public Affairs photo.
- Born: November 3, 1893; St. Louis, Missouri, U.S.
- Died: February 12, 1975 (aged 81); Beverly Hills, California, U.S.
- Burial place: West Point Cemetery, West Point, New York
- Military career
- Allegiance: United States
- Branch: United States Army
- Service years: 1915–1953
- Rank: Major General
- Service number: 03896
- Commands: 3rd Battalion, 42nd Infantry; 3rd Battalion, 33rd Infantry; 40th Armored Regiment; Combat Command A, 3rd Armored Division; 3rd Armored Division; 79th Infantry Division; International Military Tribunal Command, Germany; Southern District, Sixth United States Army; Fort Lewis; Chief of Civil Affairs, U. S. Far East Command; U.S. Defense Advisory Group, Japan
- Conflicts: Pancho Villa Expedition; World War I Occupation of Germany (1919); World War II; Occupation of Germany (1945); Occupation of Japan
- Awards: Silver Star (2); Legion of Merit (2); Bronze Star Medal (3)
- Other work: Business executive, Fletcher Aviation; Mayor of Beverly Hills, California

Leroy Hugh Watson (November 3, 1893 – February 12, 1975) was a career officer in the United States Army who attained the rank of major general. A 1915 graduate of the United States Military Academy ("The class the stars fell on"), Watson served in the Pancho Villa Expedition and World War I.

During World War II, Watson commanded the 3rd Armored Division from August 1942 to August 1944. Concerned that he was not leading the division effectively during combat in France, his superior, Omar Bradley, a West Point classmate and lifelong friend, relieved him of duty. Rather than request a stateside assignment that would allow him to keep his temporary rank, Watson agreed to accept a reduction in rank in order to remain in France. Watson was reduced in rank to colonel and assigned to the staff of Bradley's Twelfth United States Army Group. Soon afterwards, Brigadier General Norman Cota was transferred from assignment as assistant division commander of the 29th Infantry Division to commander of the 28th Infantry Division and promoted to major general. Watson was selected to replace Cota at the 29th Infantry Division. In November 1944, he was again promoted to brigadier general, reclaiming general officer's rank less than three months after his demotion. In August 1945, Watson was appointed to command the 79th Infantry Division, which he led until it was inactivated in December 1945.

Following the war, Watson served as commander of the International Military Tribunal Command in Germany, where he worked to enhance security and ensure that none of the Nazis on trial for war crimes was able to escape. His later assignments included chief of Civil Affairs for the U.S. Far East Command and commander of US Defense Advisory Group, Japan. In early 1953 he was promoted to major general, and he retired later that year.

After retiring, Watson lived in Beverly Hills, California, where he served on the city council and was mayor from 1962 to 1963. He died in Beverly Hills on February 12, 1975, and was buried at West Point Cemetery.

== Early life ==
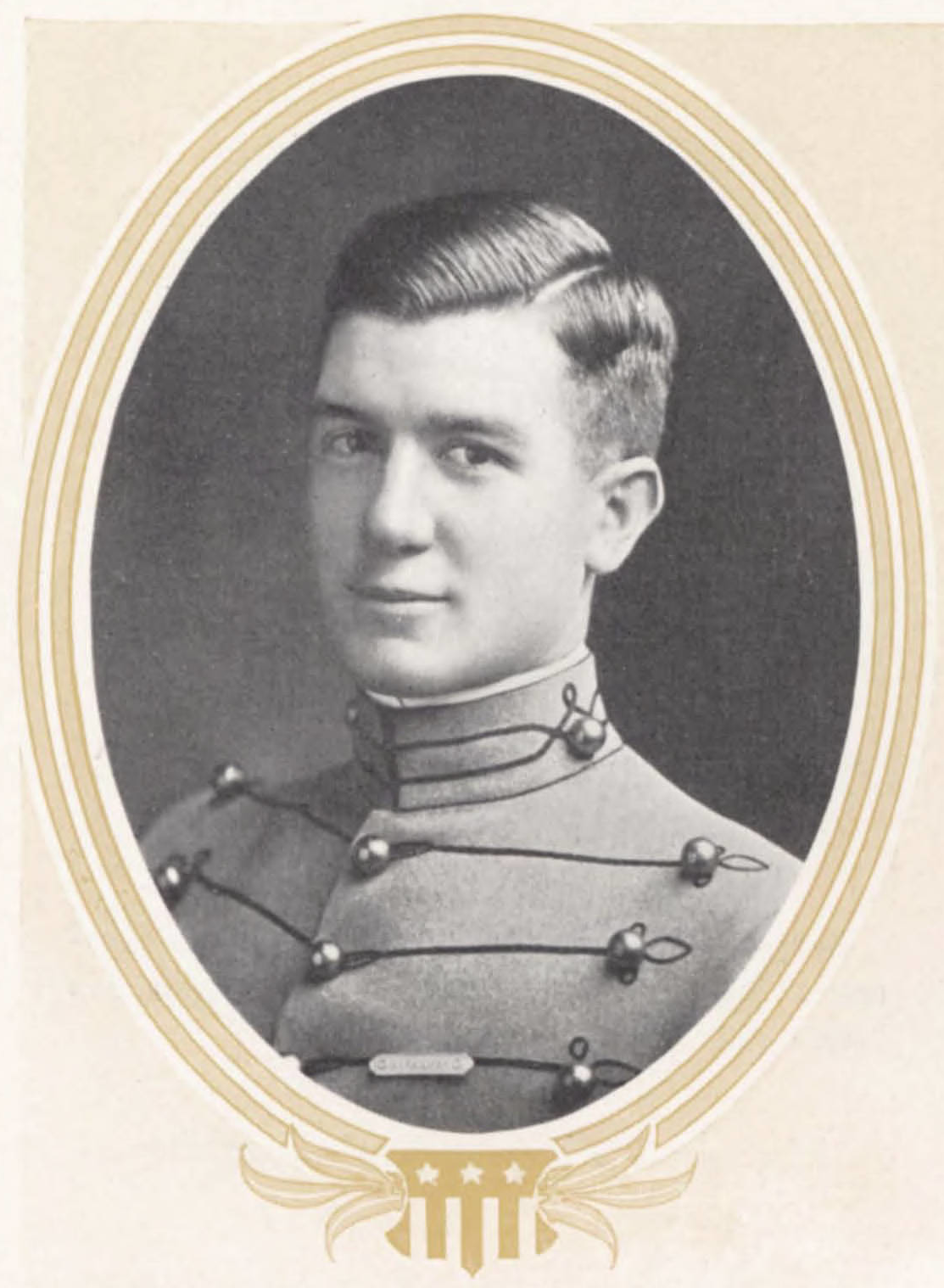
At West Point in 1915

Leroy H. Watson was born in St. Louis, Missouri on November 3, 1893, (Note: A few sources, including Watson's gravestone inscription, give his birth year as 1894. Most, including the 1900 U.S. Census, the editions of the U.S. Army Register published during his career, and the Social Security Death Index, give it as 1893.) the son of furrier George Washington Watson and Sarah Ann (Callahan) Watson. He attended the public schools of St. Louis and was a 1910 graduate of McKinley High School.

Watson received appointment to the United States Military Academy in 1911. He graduated in 1915, a member of "The class the stars fell on", and was ranked 151st of 164. Watson was appointed a second lieutenant of Infantry and initially assigned to border security with the 22nd Infantry Regiment at Camp Harry J. Jones, Arizona during the Pancho Villa Expedition. He was soon transferred to the 11th Infantry and promoted to first lieutenant. He received his promotion to captain in May 1917.

== World War I ==
In June 1917, Watson was transferred to the 51st Infantry, a unit of the 6th Division. He served as regimental exchange officer and regimental adjutant before commanding a battalion, and briefly commanded the regiment during the first week of November.

The 51st Infantry arrived in France in June 1918, and Watson was promoted to major in July. He was the regimental adjutant for most of the war, and took part in combat from August until its end in November, including the Meuse-Argonne Offensive, earning his first award of the Silver Star. After the Armistice, Watson remained in Germany as part of the Army of Occupation. He returned to the United States in June 1919 and demobilized with his regiment at Camp Grant, Illinois, on June 19.

== Post-World War I ==
After his regiment was demobilized, Watson remained at Camp Grant and served as a recruiting officer. He graduated from the Infantry School's course for field grade officers in 1921. After graduating, Watson was retained at the Infantry School as an instructor, where he remained until 1925. In 1922 he was reduced to his permanent rank of captain, and he was promoted to major again in September 1925.

In October 1925, Watson arrived for duty in the Panama Canal Zone, and he successively commanded 3rd Battalion, 42nd Infantry (1925-1927), and 3rd Battalion, 33rd Infantry (1927-1928). In 1928, Watson returned to the United States to become a student at the Command and General Staff College. He graduated in 1930 and remained at the college to serve as an instructor.

In 1934, Watson graduated from the Chemical Warfare School's course for field grade officers, and he was also a 1934 graduate of the United States Army War College. Later that year he was posted to Fort McPherson, Georgia. In 1936 Watson received assignment to the Army general staff in Washington. In 1937 he was promoted to lieutenant colonel. In 1940 he was assigned to the staff of the Philippine Department.

== World War II ==
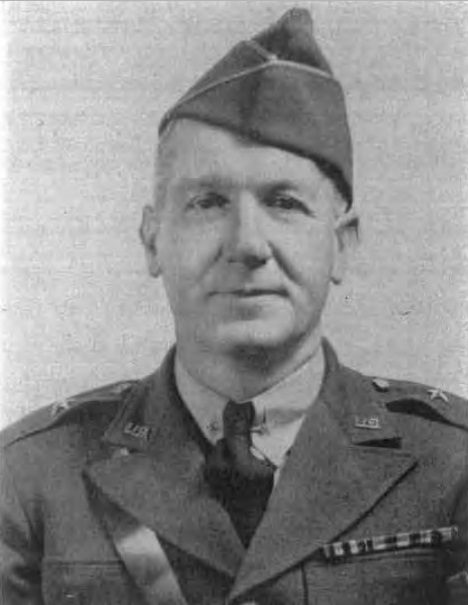
From 1946's The Cross of Lorraine: A Combat History of the 79th Infantry Division, June 1942-December 1945

At the start of World War II, Watson completed the Tank Officer's Course and was assigned as executive officer of the 66th Armor Regiment. He was promoted to colonel in 1941 and assigned to command 40th Armored Regiment, 3rd Armored Brigade. When the Army reorganized its armor forces into divisions in February 1942, it created three brigade-level Combat Commands in each. Originally named 1st, 2nd, and 3rd Combat Commands, these organizations were later re-designated Combat Commands A, B, and R (Reserve). When the 3rd Armored Division was fielded in 1942, Watson was named commander of the division's 1st Combat Command (Combat Command A) and promoted to brigadier general.

In August 1942, Watson was named commander of the 3rd Armored Division and promoted to major general. After completing its organization and training in Louisiana, California, and Pennsylvania, the organization arrived in Somerset, England in June 1943, where it continued to train.

Watson led 3rd Armored Division during combat in France beginning in late June 1944 as part of First United States Army. Unhappy with the division's progress in Normandy, in early August 1944, VII Corps commander J. Lawton Collins decided to relieve Watson of command. Collins’ superior, Omar Bradley, a West Point classmate of Watson's, initially disagreed with Collins, but ultimately decided to concur with Collins’ decision. Watson was replaced by Maurice Rose.

When Watson was relieved of command, he requested to remain in the area of combat operations in France at any rank rather than return to the United States in a training or administrative role with a general's rank. Impressed by Watson's request, Bradley informed his superior Dwight Eisenhower (another of Watson's West Point classmates) at Supreme Headquarters Allied Expeditionary Force (SHAEF), and they agreed to retain Watson in France. He was reduced in rank to colonel and assigned to Bradley's staff at Twelfth United States Army Group Headquarters.

On August 14, Norman Cota, the assistant division commander of the 29th Infantry Division, was promoted to major general and assigned to command the 28th Infantry Division. After considering possible replacements for Cota, Bradley and Eisenhower decided on Watson. (The 29th Division fell under XIX Corps, not VII Corps, which meant the 29th's leaders would not report to Collins, a circumstance that likely factored into Bradley and Eisenhower's decision.) Watson served with the 29th Division during combat in France and Germany throughout the rest of 1944 and early 1945. In December 1944, he was promoted to brigadier general. In August 1945, Watson was appointed to command the 79th Infantry Division, which he led during post-war occupation duty in Germany until it was inactivated in December 1945.

== Post-World War II ==
Following the war, Watson served as commander of the International Military Tribunal Command in Germany, where he worked to enhance security and ensure that none of the Nazis on trial for war crimes were able to escape. His later assignments included command of Sixth United States Army's Southern District, command of Fort Lewis in Washington state, chief of Civil Affairs for the U.S. Far East Command, and commander of US Defense Advisory Group, Japan. In early 1953 he was promoted to major general, and he retired later that year.

== Civilian career ==
After retiring from the Army, Watson resided in Beverly Hills, California, and was appointed assistant to the president of Fletcher Aviation, with responsibility for providing oversight, advice and guidance for Fletcher's military aviation projects and programs. He was subsequently promoted to vice president and retired from Fletcher following a 1961 heart attack.

A Republican, Watson also served for eight years on the Beverly Hills City Council beginning in 1960. From 1962 to 1963 he served as mayor after being elected by a vote of his peers on the council.

In 1965, Dwight Eisenhower authored a Reader's Digest article on leadership, and cited Watson's relief as commander of the 3rd Armored Division and request to remain in France at a lower rank as a notable example of selfless service. In an interview about the article, Watson began to object to the way Eisenhower had characterized his pre-relief performance, but then stopped himself and told the reporter that most of the details in Eisenhower's article were correct, and there was no point in arguing about the rest.

In retirement, Watson was also active with the Winsor Memorial Heart Research Foundation of Los Angeles. The foundation worked with him on the "Watson Project," a procedure Watson devised for clearing obstructed blood vessels.

== Death and burial ==
Watson died in Beverly Hills on February 12, 1975. He was buried at West Point Cemetery on February 19, 1975.

== Awards ==
Watson's military awards included:

- Silver Star with oak leaf cluster
- Legion of Merit with oak leaf cluster
- Bronze Star Medal with two oak leaf clusters
- Army Commendation Medal with oak leaf cluster
- Mexican Border Service Medal
- World War I Victory Medal with two campaign clasps
- Army of Occupation of Germany Medal
- American Defense Service Medal
- American Campaign Medal
- European-African-Middle Eastern Campaign Medal with two campaign stars
- World War II Victory Medal
- Army of Occupation Medal with "Germany" clasp
- National Defense Service Medal
- Legion of Honor (France)
- Croix de Guerre (France)
- Order of the White Lion, 3rd Class (Czechoslovakia)

== Family ==
Watson was married four times. In 1915, he married Alice Virginia Furey (1896–1942). They were the parents of four children - Sarah (Sally, a nun in the Sisters of Charity) (1916–2005), Leroy Jr. (1917–1959), Margaret (Peggy) (1921–2013), and Robert (1933–1990).

In 1943, Watson married Elizabeth Livingston (1891–1958), and they divorced at the end of World War II. While stationed in Germany after the war in 1946, he married Liba J. Besin (1923–1949), a native of Czechoslovakia and former translator at the Nuremberg trials, with whom he had a daughter, Antoinette. In 1950, he married Beulah Beatrice (Beggs) Pellekaan (1890–1990) of Beverly Hills, the widow of a Shell Oil Company executive.

== Sources ==
=== Newspapers ===
- "St. Louisan Gets Military Diploma By Record Effort". St. Louis Post-Dispatch. St. Louis, MO. June 13, 1915. p. 8 – via Newspapers.com.
- "Army Orders". The Atlanta Constitution. Atlanta, GA. April 25, 1934. p. 8 – via Newspapers.com.
- "Changes Scheduled at Fort McPherson". The Atlanta Constitution. Atlanta, GA. March 24, 1936. p. 8 – via Newspapers.com.
- "Army Orders for February 3". Los Angeles Times. Los Angeles, CA. Associated Press. February 4, 1940. p. 12 – via Newspapers.com.
- "Camouflage Proves Too Expert A Job". Tampa Times. Tampa, FL. November 4, 1941. p. 12 – via Newspapers.com.
- "3rd Armored Officers Get Advancement". The Times. Shreveport, LA. Associated Press. February 15, 1942. p. 10 – via Newspapers.com.
- "Maj. Gen. Leroy H. Watson Marries Magazine Editor". St. Louis Post-Dispatch. St. Louis, MO. April 11, 1943. p. 3A – via Newspapers.com.
- "Funerals: Liba J. Watson". Wilmington Press-Journal. Wilmington, Los Angeles, CA. March 24, 1949. p. 6 – via Newspapers.com.
- "500 Boy Scouts Set Up Camp At Fort MacArthur". Wilmington Press-Journal. Wilmington, Los Angeles, CA. November 18, 1949. p. 1 – via Newspapers.com.
- "Brig. Gen. Watson Weds Beverly Hills Matron". Los Angeles Times. Los Angeles, CA. August 10, 1950. p. 13 – via Newspapers.com.
- "Gen. Watson Joins SCAP Civil Affairs". Pacific Stars and Stripes. Washington, DC. June 18, 1951. p. 1 – via NewspaperArchive.com.
- "Army Secretary Shifts Generals". Wilmington Morning News. Wilmington, DE. United Press International. November 24, 1953. p. 8 – via Newspapers.com.
- "Air Colonel Found Dead". The Arizona Republic. Phoenix, AZ. March 11, 1959. p. 9 – via Newspapers.com.
- "How Los Angeles County Cities Voted". Los Angeles Times. Los Angeles, CA. April 13, 1960. p. 29 – via Newspapers.com.
- "Names in the News: Beverly Hills; Maj. Gen. Leroy Watson is president of the Beverly Hills Republican Club for the 1960-61 year". Los Angeles Times. Los Angeles, CA. June 19, 1960. p. 10 – via Newspapers.com.
- "2 Cities Get New Mayors". Los Angeles Times. Los Angeles, CA. April 19, 1962. p. 1 – via Newspapers.com.
- "Week in Review: Eugene Gunther Elected Mayor". Los Angeles Times. Los Angeles, CA. April 21, 1963. p. 2 – via Newspapers.com.
- Torgeson, Dial (May 26, 1965). "21 Years Later - Eisenhower Praises general he Once 'Busted'". The Fresno Bee. Fresno, CA. Associated Press. p. 13C – via Newspapers.com.
- Greenwood, Noel (April 21, 1968). "Compliments Give B. H. Council a Glow as Stone Replaces Watson". Los Angeles Times. Los Angeles, CA. p. 7 – via Newspapers.com.
- "L. H. Watson, Retired General, Dies at 81". Los Angeles Times. Los Angeles, CA. February 13, 1975. p. 18 – via Newspapers.com.
- "Leroy Watson, Normandy General, Dies". The New York Times. New York, NY. Associated Press. February 14, 1975. p. 35.

=== Books ===
- Donaldson, William H. (1930). Biographical Register of the Officers and Graduates of the U.S. Military Academy. Vol. 7. Chicago, IL: R. R. Donnelley & Sons Company, The Lakeside Press. pp. 1114–1115 – via United States Military Academy Library.
- Robinson, Wirt (1920). Supplement, Biographical Register of the Officers and Graduates of the U.S. Military Academy. Vol. VI–B. Saginaw, MI: Seeman & Peters. pp. 1798–1799 – via United States Military Academy Library.
- US Army Adjutant General (1949). Official Army Register for 1949. Washington, DC: US Government Printing Office. p. 569.
- U.S. Senate (1939). Journal of the Executive Proceedings of the Senate of the United States. Vol. 78. U.S. Government Printing Office: Washington, DC. p. 39 – via Google Books.
- Zaloga, Steven J. (2000). Lorraine 1944: Patton versus Manteuffel. Oxford, United Kingdom: Osprey Publishing. p. 27. ISBN 978-1-84176-089-6.
- The National Cyclopedia of American Biography. Vol. 59. Chicago, IL: J. T. White & Company. 1980. p. 401. ISBN 978-0-8837-1031-9.

=== Internet ===
- "1900 United States Federal Census, Entry for George W. Watson Family". Ancestry.com. Lehi, UT: Ancestry.com LLC. 1900.
- "New York Passenger and Crew Lists, 1820-1957, Entry for Liba J. Watson and Antoinette Watson, SS Blanche F. Sigman". Ancestry.com. Lehi, UT: Ancestry.com LLC. May 11, 1948.
- "Commanders at Fort Lewis/Joint Base Lewis-McChord". Lewisarmymuseum.com. Joint Base Lewis-McChord, WA: Lewis Army Museum. November 28, 2014.
- "3rd Armored Division Commanders". 3ADMG. 3rd Armored Division Memorial Group.
- "Combat Chronicle, 3d Armored Division". History.army.mil. U.S. Army Center of Military History. Archived from the original on January 9, 2010.
- "Combat Chronicle, 79th Infantry Division". History.army.mil. U.S. Army Center of Military History. Archived from the original on January 9, 2010.
- Dugan, Haynes W. "Normandy and Northern France: The St. Lo Breakthrough". 3ad.com. 3AD History Website.
- "Command and Staff: 29th Infantry Division". Order of Battle of the US Army - WWII - ETO. U.S. Army Center of Military History. Archived from the original on January 9, 2008.
- "New York State Marriage Records for 1847-1849, 1907-1936, Entry for Leroy Hugh Watson and Alice Virginia Furey". Ancestry.com. Lehi, UT: Ancestry.com LLC. 1915.
- "Indiana Death Certificates, 1899-2011, Entry for Elizabeth Livingston". Ancestry.com. Lehi, UT: Ancestry.com LLC. March 21, 1958.

=== Magazines ===
- "Appointments: Maj. Gen. Leroy H. Watson". Aviation Week. Vol. 60. New York, NY: McGraw-Hill. 1954. p. 10.
- "Death Notice, Leroy Hugh Watson". Assembly. West Point, NY: Association of Graduates, USMA. June 1975. p. 112.

Military offices
Preceded by Walton Walker	Commanding General 3rd Armored Division; 1942–1944	Succeeded by Maurice Rose
Preceded by Ira T. Wyche	Commanding General 79th Infantry Division; May–July 1945	Succeeded by Anthony McAuliffe
Preceded by Anthony McAuliffe	Commanding General 79th Infantry Division; August–December 1945	Succeeded by Post deactivated
Political offices
Preceded by Jack Freeman	Mayor of Beverly Hills, California; 1962-1963	Succeeded by Eugene W. Gunther
