= 5th Ranger Battalion =

Ranger battalion activated during WWII

5th Ranger Infantry Battalion
- Shoulder sleeve patch of the 5th Ranger Battalion
- Active: September 1, 1943 – October 22, 1945
- Country: United States
- Branch: United States Army
- Type: Special operations forces
- Size: Battalion
- Engagements: World War II: Battle of Normandy; Battle for Brest; Battle of the Bulge; Battle of Huertgen Forest

Commanders
- Notable commanders: Lt. Col. Max F. Schneider

The 5th Ranger Infantry Battalion was a Ranger battalion activated during World War II on 1 September 1943 at Camp Forrest, Tennessee. By this time, while in maneuvers on the United States, they were commanded by the Major Owen Carter. Later, when they moved to England, they were commanded by Major (later Lieutenant Colonel) Max Schneider, former executive officer of the 4th Ranger Battalion, who led the 5th Rangers as part of the Provisional Ranger Group commanded by Colonel James Earl Rudder.

== History ==
=== World War II ===
The 5th Ranger Battalion was activated on 1 September 1943 at Camp Forrest, Tennessee. During the Battle of Normandy, the battalion landed on Omaha Beach along with Companies A, B, and C of the 2nd Ranger Battalion, where elements of the 116th Infantry Regiment of the 29th Infantry Division were pinned down by machine gun fire and mortars from the heights above. General Omar Bradley considered abandoning the beachhead instead of sending more men to perish, and during the battle General Norman Cota, Assistant Division Commander of the 29th Infantry Division, gave the now famous order that has become the motto of the 75th Ranger Regiment: "Rangers, Lead The Way!"

The 5th Battalion Rangers broke across the seawall and barbed wire entanglements, and up the pillbox-rimmed heights under intense enemy machine gun and mortar fire and with A, B, and C Companies of the 2nd Ranger Battalion and elements of the 116th Infantry Regiment, advanced four miles (6 km) to the key town of Vierville-sur-Mer, thus opening the breach for supporting troops to follow up and expand the beachhead. Meanwhile, D, E, and F Companies of the 2nd Ranger Battalion landed west of the Vierville draw and suffered 50 percent casualties during the landing, scaling a 90-foot (27 m) cliff using ropes and ladders to knock out a formidable enemy artillery position that was sweeping the beach with deadly fire.

The 5th Battalion with elements of the 116th Regiment finally linked up with the beleaguered D, E, and F Companies of 2nd Battalion on D+3, although Lieutenant Charles Parker of A Company, 5th Battalion, had penetrated deep behind enemy lines on D-Day and reached the 2nd Battalion with 20 prisoners. Later, with the 2nd Battalion, the unit distinguished itself in the hard-fought Battle for Brest in August and September of 1944, taking the Fort de Toulbroc'h on September 2. Under the leadership of Lieutenant Colonel Richard Sullivan, the 5th Ranger Battalion took part in the Battle of Huertgen Forest, Battle of the Bulge and other tough battles throughout central Europe, earning two Distinguished Unit Citations and the French Croix de Guerre.

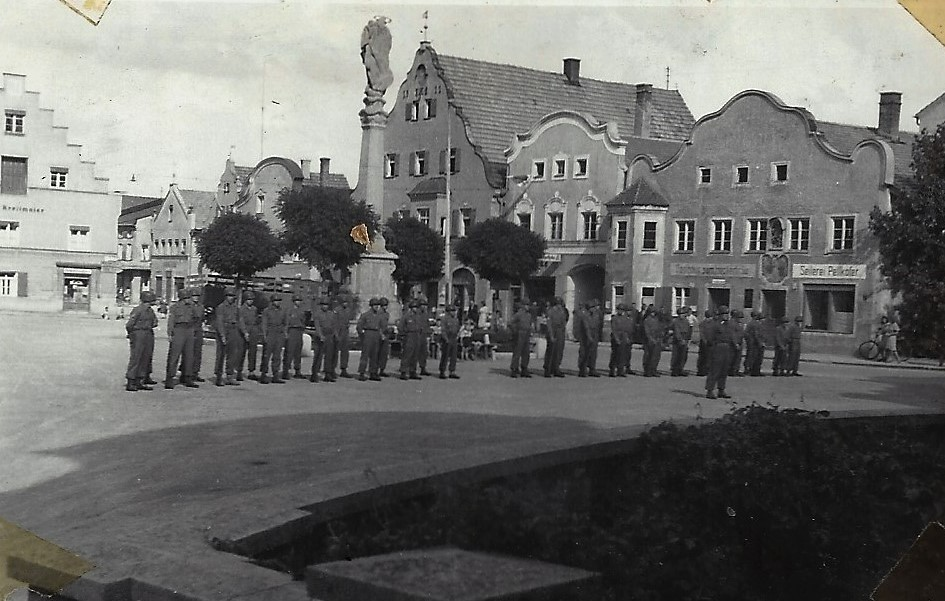
Occupying Grafing, 1945

At the close of the war, the battalion was billeted in Grafing during the spring and summer of 1945.

=== Deactivation ===
The outfit was deactivated 22 October 1945 at Camp Myles Standish, Massachusetts.

In 1986, the still deactivated 5th Ranger Battalion was consolidated with units of the 75th Infantry Regiment (Ranger) during its reorganization into the 75th Ranger Regiment.

== Battle honors ==
Battle honors received for actions in the invasion of France:

- Citation approved by the Commanding General, First U.S. Army, in the name of the President of the United States for actions as leading assault unit on the beach at H-Hour on D-Day in the invasion of France.
- Commendation from Major General C. H. Gerhardt for participation in the capture of the City of Brest, Fort Pt. Minon and Fort De Mengaht.
- Commendation from Lieutenant General William H. Simpson in the capture of Brest.
