= James Edward Wharton =

U.S. Army Brigadier General

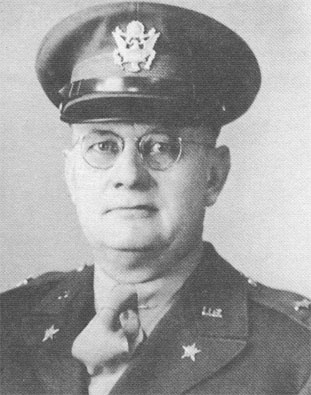
- Born: December 2, 1894; Elk, Chaves County, New Mexico, United States
- Died: August 12, 1944 (aged 49); Sourdeval, Normandy, France
- Military career
- Allegiance: United States
- Branch: United States Army
- Service years: 1917–1944
- Rank: Brigadier General
- Service number: 0-7025
- Unit: Infantry Branch
- Commands: 1st Engineer Special Brigade; 28th Infantry Division
- Conflicts: World War I World War II: Operation Overlord
- Awards: Army Distinguished Service Medal; Legion of Merit; Purple Heart

Brigadier General James Edward Wharton (December 2, 1894 – August 12, 1944) was a career United States Army officer who briefly commanded the 28th Infantry Division in the Battle of Normandy before being killed in action during World War II.

== Early life and military career ==
Wharton was born in Elk, Chaves County, New Mexico on December 2, 1894. He grew up in New Mexico and Arizona, and graduated from the College of Agriculture and Mechanic Arts at New Mexico State University in 1917. He received his commission as a second lieutenant through the Reserve Officers' Training Corps (ROTC).

Wharton was commissioned in the Infantry Branch. His World War I and subsequent assignments included the 62nd and 57th Infantry Regiments in the Philippines, and he later served at Camp Fremont, Fort Benning, Fort Lee, and with the 3rd U.S. Infantry at Fort Snelling. Wharton also served as an instructor at the U.S. Army Command and General Staff College.

In addition to graduating from the U.S. Army Infantry School at Fort Benning, Wharton was a graduate of the Army Command and General Staff College, United States Army War College, and Army Industrial College.

== World War II and death ==
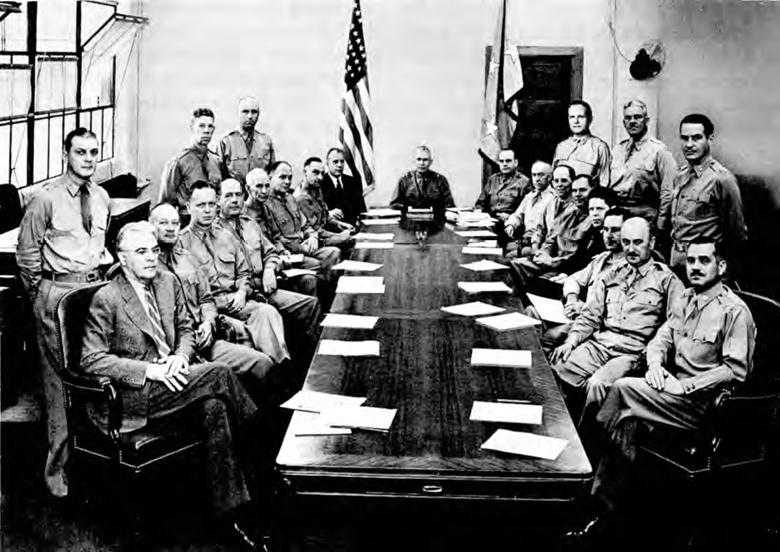
Weekly Staff Conference at United States Army Services of Supply (USASOS) headquarters in June 1942. Brigadier General James Edward Wharton is seated, second from the left.

He was Chief of the Officer Branch in the Personnel Division (G-1) of the War Department General Staff when the United States entered World War II. In March, 1942, he was promoted to the temporary rank of brigadier general as Director of the Military Personnel Division in the Army Services of Supply.

In 1943 he served as Assistant Division Commander (ADC) of the 80th Infantry Division during its creation and initial training.

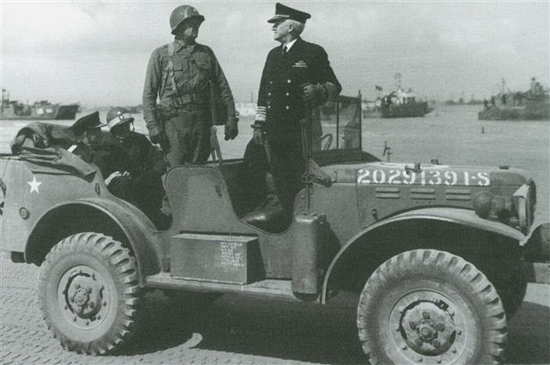
Brigadier General James Edward Wharton (left), commander of the 1st Engineer Special Brigade, escorts Admiral Harold Stark on Utah Beach shortly after the D-Day landings in 1944.

Wharton commanded the 1st Engineer Special Brigade on Utah Beach as part of the D-Day landings in Normandy. Engineer Special Brigades were large organizations (15 to 20 thousand soldiers) which were responsible for transferring equipment and personnel off the beachheads and making them available for assault operations.

After the D-Day invasion he succeeded Brigadier General Donald A. Stroh as ADC of the 9th Infantry Division, then commanded by Major General Manton S. Eddy and serving in Normandy.

He remained in this post only briefly, however, as on August 12, Wharton succeeded Major General Lloyd D. Brown as Commanding General (CG) of the 28th Infantry Division. On the same day that Wharton took command, he was visiting his front line units in order to gain an understanding of their current situation. He was shot and killed by a German sniper while at the command post of the 112th Infantry Regiment near Sourdeval, Normandy, France. He was succeeded by Norman Cota.

Wharton, the first of three American divisional commanders to be killed by enemy fire during the war, (Note: The other division commanders to be killed were: Major General Edwin D. Patrick, CG 6th Infantry Division, and Major General Maurice Rose, CG 3rd Armored Division.) was temporarily interred in France. He was later buried at Arlington National Cemetery, Section 34, Site 1198.

== Awards ==
- Army Distinguished Service Medal for his achievements with the 1st Engineer Special Brigade and the 80th and 9th Infantry Divisions.
- Legion of Merit for superior service with the Services of Supply.
- Purple Heart (posthumous).
- World War I Victory Medal
- American Defense Service Medal
- American Campaign Medal
- European-African-Middle Eastern Campaign Medal with one campaign star
- World War II Victory Medal (posthumous)

== Legacy ==
In 1952 the 112th Infantry Regiment was stationed in Heilbronn, Germany when the 28th Division was activated for the Korean War. The casern used as its headquarters was christened Wharton Barracks. Wharton Barracks was closed in 1989.

== Family ==
In 1921 Wharton married Madelyn Burke of Petersburg, Virginia (1893–1952). Their children included sons Edward B. (1927–1991) and Robert H. (born 1929). Robert H. Wharton became a priest in 1954.

Military offices
Preceded by Lloyd D. Brown	Commanding General 28th Infantry Division; 12 August 1944	Succeeded by Norman Cota
