= H-Hour (D-Day) =

Beginning of naval assault during the Normandy landings of World War II

H-Hour (redundant acronym of hour) was the name given to the beginning of the amphibious assault during the Normandy landings of World War II. H-Hour occurred at 6:30 a.m. local time on June 6, 1944.
