= Max Ferguson Schneider =

- Born: September 8, 1912; Shenandoah, Iowa
- Died: March 25, 1959 (aged 46); South Korea
- Burial place: National Memorial Cemetery of the Pacific
- Military career
- Allegiance: United States of America
- Branch: United States Army
- Service years: 1939–1959
- Rank: Colonel
- Commands: 5th Ranger Battalion
- Conflicts: World War II: first assault at Arzew; Battle of El Guettar; Italian Campaign; Battle of Normandy; Korean War
- Awards: Distinguished Service Cross; Silver Star; Legion of Merit; Soldier's Medal; Bronze Star (2); Purple Heart; Army Commendation Medal; Combat Infantryman's Badge; Presidential Unit Citation

Max Ferguson Schneider (September 8, 1912 – March 25, 1959) was a colonel in the United States Army Rangers. During World War II, he led the 5th Ranger Battalion on the Battle of Normandy.

== Military career ==
Schneider was born and raised in Shenandoah, Iowa. In 1939, he was commissioned as a second lieutenant in the National Guard. in 1940 his company was mobilized and Schneider was in training in Louisiana during the Attack on Pearl Harbor. Schneider was assigned to serve in the 2nd Battalion, 168th Infantry Regiment, 34th Infantry Division, a National Guard division and the first ground combat troops to arrive in Europe. As World War II progressed, Schneider volunteered for the newly formed 1st Ranger Battalion, under the command of William Orlando Darby, and became a company commander. "Darby's Rangers" trained with their British counterparts in Scotland and in 1943, the 1st Ranger Battalion made its first assault at Arzew. Schneider led E Company, 1st Ranger Battalion, during the North Africa campaign, including the Sened Raid in Tunisia, for which he was awarded the Silver Star, and the Battle of El Guettar. During the Italian Campaign Schneider served as the executive officer of the 4th Ranger Battalion.

Afterwards he was assigned to the Provisional Ranger Group, commanded by Colonel James Earl Rudder. Just before the Battle of Normandy, Schneider was given command on the 5th Ranger Battalion. He led the 5th Ranger Battalion during the landing on Omaha Beach. For Schneider's actions in the battle, he was awarded the Distinguished Service Cross. In August 1944 Schneider, by then a lieutenant colonel, was sent to the United States. He completed Command and General Staff College and received a Regular Army commission in 1946.

Schneider fought in the Korean War. In 1959, while he was posted in South Korea, he died by suicide.

== Honors ==
Schneider received the nation's second-highest award for valor, the Distinguished Service Cross. He was inducted posthumously to the Army Ranger Hall of Fame in 1992.
