= Norman Cota =

U.S. Army Major General

Norman D. Cota
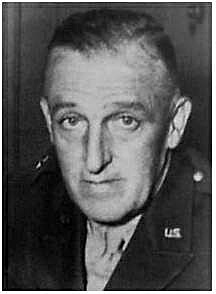
- Born: May 30, 1893; Chelsea, Massachusetts, U.S.
- Died: October 4, 1971 (aged 78); Wichita, Kansas, U.S.
- Military career
- Allegiance: United States
- Branch: United States Army
- Service years: 1917–1946
- Rank: Major general
- Nickname: "Dutch"
- Service number: O-5284
- Unit: Infantry Branch
- Commands: 28th Infantry Division
- Conflicts: World War I World War II
- Awards: Distinguished Service Cross; Army Distinguished Service Medal; Silver Star (2); Legion of Merit (2); Bronze Star (2); Purple Heart
- Other work: Zone administrator, War Assets Administration; Civil defense director, Montgomery County, Pennsylvania

Norman Daniel Cota Sr., nicknamed "Dutch" (May 30, 1893 – October 4, 1971) was a senior United States Army officer who fought during World War II. Cota was heavily involved in the planning and execution of the Allied invasion of Normandy, in June 1944, codenamed Operation Neptune, and the subsequent Battle of Normandy. He is known for rallying demoralized troops on Omaha Beach on D-Day, by engaging in combat beside them and personally leading their first successful breakout, for which he was awarded the Distinguished Service Cross (DSC).

== Early life and military career ==
Cota was born in Chelsea, Massachusetts, son of George William Cota, a former railroad telegrapher (later a merchant), and Jessie H. Mason, a school teacher whose family lines can be traced to Capt. Hugh Mason and Hester Welles (Wells) on "The Francis", part of "The Winthrop Fleet", the secord or third ship that arrived after the arrival of "The Mayflower". He attended Worcester Academy for three years beginning in the fall of 1910. While playing football there, his teammates nicknamed him "Dutch;" the name stuck with him, but its origins remain unclear.

In June 1913, he was accepted to the United States Military Academy (USMA) at West Point, New York. The U.S. entered World War I on 6 April 1917, so the Class of 1917 graduated on 20 April, seven weeks ahead of schedule. Cota played for the Army Cadets football team, where he was a teammate of Dwight D. Eisenhower and Omar Bradley.

Cota, graduating 79th in a class of 139, was commissioned as a second lieutenant in the Infantry Branch, and his first assignment was with the 22nd Infantry Regiment. Due to the outbreak of war, Cota was quickly promoted to first lieutenant, then captain after only a few months. By the time he had accumulated 18 months of active duty, he was a major. He was assigned to become an instructor in tactics at West Point shortly before the end of the war on 11 November 1918, and he remained on the faculty until 1920.

== Between the wars ==
In 1919, the Army downsized and Cota reverted to captain from his temporary wartime rank of major. While post financial officer at Langley Field, Virginia in 1922, he was held personally responsible when the post was robbed of $43,000. It took an appeal to Congress for him to be absolved of having to personally repay the stolen funds.

He later served in Hawaii (1924–1928) and graduated from the U.S. Army Command and General Staff College (CGSC) at Fort Leavenworth, Kansas in June 1931. His student paper "Study of the dispositions of the Turkish 19th Division on the night of April 24–25 and its operations to include the night of April 27–28" was about the Gallipoli Campaign in World War I. He was an instructor at the U.S. Army Infantry School (1932–1933) and graduated from the U.S. Army War College in 1936. He was an instructor at the U.S. Army Command and General Staff School (1938–1940). While there he was promoted to lieutenant colonel on July 1, 1940. He then became the executive officer (XO) for the 16th Infantry Regiment at Fort Jay, Governors Island, New York.

== World War II ==
=== North Africa ===
At the outbreak of the American entry into World War II, he was the G-2 Officer (Intelligence) and then G-3 Officer (Plans and Training) of the 1st Infantry Division from March 1941 until June 1942, during which time he was promoted again, this time to the temporary rank of colonel, on December 13, 1941. In June 1942, he was promoted to chief of staff of the division, a position he held until February 1943.

In that same month, right after his involvement in the Allied invasion of North Africa, under the command of Major General Terry Allen, he prepared a report which included suggested revisions to the task organization of assault divisions, and his recommendations were adopted during preparations for Operation Husky, the codename for the Allied invasion of Sicily. He was promoted to the one-star general officer rank of brigadier general in the Army of the United States (AUS) on February 2, 1943 and was quickly sent to the United Kingdom, where he served as the American advisor to the Combined Operations Division of the European Theater of Operations (ETO). In that capacity, Cota helped supervise the training for amphibious landing operations.

=== Operation Overlord ===
As a major advisor in Operation Overlord, he was made the assistant division commander (ADC) of the 29th Infantry Division, which was designated to land at Omaha Beach during the Battle of Normandy. The 29th Division, a National Guard formation nicknamed the "Blue and Gray", was commanded by his fellow West Point classmate, Major General Charles H. Gerhardt. During the planning for D-Day, he opposed daylight landings, believing a pre-dawn assault would stand a better chance of success. A year before the invasion, at the Conference on Landing Assaults, Cota had argued in favor of striving for tactical surprise:

It is granted that strategical surprise will be impossible to attain. Tactical surprise is another thing however...tactical surprise is one of the most powerful factors in determining success. I therefore, favor the night landing. I do not believe the daylight assault can succeed.

Cota was not alone in his opposition. Major General Leonard T. Gerow, commander of V Corps, and Admiral John L. Hall Jr., commander of Amphibious Force "O" (the naval force responsible for delivery of the 1st Infantry Division to the beach), both fought to change the Operation Overlord plan, pleading for a nighttime assault.

However, the high command decided otherwise, concluding that naval and air bombardment would hopefully neutralize, or in the best case, eradicate, enemy opposition. The plan for Omaha essentially called for hurling infantry directly at a prepared enemy position, a position that was enhanced by the concave shape of the beach (effectively promoting enemy crossfire into the "basin" of the concavity), natural and man-made obstacles, bad weather and other factors.

Most D-Day commanders assured their men that the Germans would be annihilated by the Allies' pre-invasion firepower, and that the defenders were, in any case, outnumbered, inexperienced and demoralized. All of these beliefs were to be proved woefully inaccurate. On the afternoon of June 5, Cota gave an accurate assessment to the staff of the 29th Infantry Division:

This is different from any of the other exercises that you've had so far. The little discrepancies that we tried to correct on Slapton Sands are going to be magnified and are going to give way to incidents that you might at first view as chaotic...You're going to find confusion. The landing craft aren't going in on schedule and people are going to be landed in the wrong place. Some won't be landed at all...We must improvise, carry on, not lose our heads.

While Cota had a far less optimistic view of the plan than the high command, even he did not completely predict the extent of the near-catastrophe that awaited V Corps (composed of the 29th Infantry Division and the famous "Big Red One" 1st Infantry Division) on Omaha Beach.

Cota landed with a part of the 116th Infantry Regiment, part of the 29th Division, in the second wave, approximately one hour after H-Hour on the Omaha sector known as Dog White. His LCVP landing craft came under heavy machine-gun fire as well as mortar and light artillery fire; three soldiers were killed immediately upon leading the disembarkation.

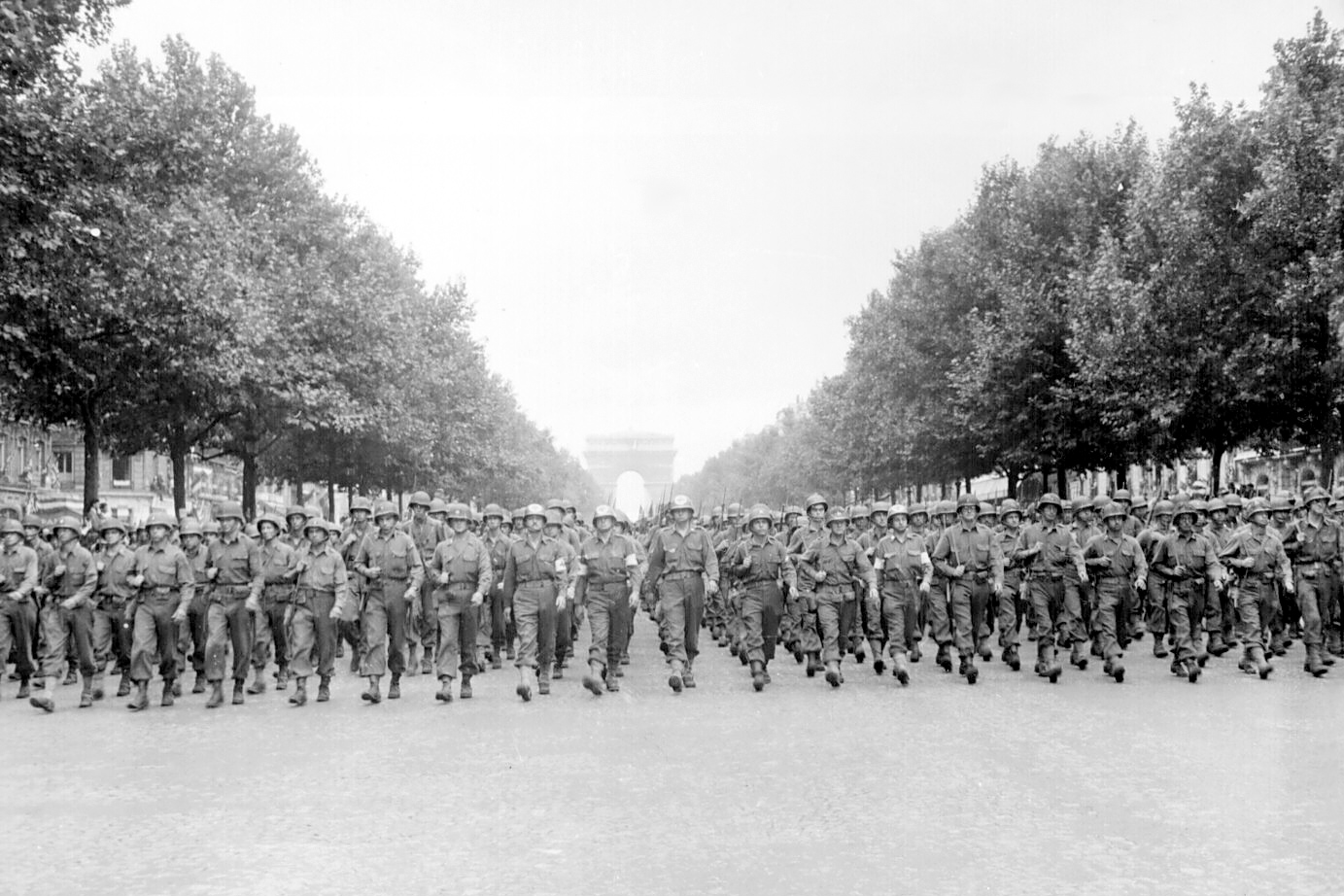
Men of the 28th Infantry Division march on the Champs Elysees in Paris.

Cota was one of the highest-ranking officers on the beach that day. After landing on the beach, he personally rallied shell-shocked, pinned-down survivors to open one of the first vehicle exits off the beach. Cota and his men advanced to the seawall, where they used Bangalore torpedoes and wire cutters to punch through. They then destroyed a machine-gun nest, after which they made a breakthrough from Omaha Beach. Two quotes Cota spoke during the initial fighting later became famous:

- In a meeting with Max Schneider, commander of the 5th Ranger Battalion, Cota asked "What outfit is this?" Someone yelled, "5th Rangers!" In an effort to inspire Schneider's men to leave the cover of the seawall and advance through a breach, Cota replied, "Well, God damn it, if you are Rangers, then get up there and lead the way!" "Rangers lead the way" became the motto of the U.S. Army Rangers.
- He was also credited with calmly rallying his troops with the statement "Gentlemen, we are being killed on the beaches. Let us go inland and be killed."

For his heroic leadership on D-Day and in the days and weeks afterwards, he was awarded the Distinguished Service Cross (DSC), the citation for which reads:

The President of the United States of America, authorized by Act of Congress, July 9, 1918, takes pleasure in presenting the Distinguished Service Cross to Brigadier General Norman Daniel Cota (ASN: 0-5284), United States Army, for extraordinary heroism in connection with military operations against an armed enemy while serving as Assistant Division Commander, 29th Infantry Division, in action against enemy forces on 6 June 1944, at Normandy, France. General Cota landed on the beach shortly after the first assault wave of troops had landed. At this time the beach was under heavy enemy rifle, machine gun, mortar and artillery fire. Numerous casualties had been suffered, the attack was arrested, and disorganization was in process. With complete disregard for his own safety, General Cota moved up and down the fire-swept beach reorganizing units and coordinating their action. Under his leadership, a vigorous attack was launched that successfully overran the enemy positions and cleared the beaches. Brigadier General Cota's superb leadership, personal bravery and zealous devotion to duty exemplify the highest traditions of the military forces of the United States and reflect great credit upon himself, the 29th Infantry Division, and the United States Army.

With the coast of Normandy eventually secured, Allied forces advanced toward Paris. On August 14, 1944, Cota was replaced as assistant division commander by Leroy H. Watson and assigned to command the 28th Infantry Division, succeeding Brigadier General James Edward Wharton, who had been killed in action by a sniper, just hours after assuming command. Cota's ADC's were, in turn, Brigadier General Kenneth Buchanan, Brigadier General George A. Davis, and Brigadier General Edmund Sebree; Brigadier General Basil H. Perry, a 1917 West Point classmate, commanded the 28th Division's artillery. After attempting to trap the retreating Germans at Le Neubourg and Elbeuf on the Seine River, Cota and the 28th Division were assigned to represent the U.S. Army in the parade celebrating the liberation of Paris. Later that year, while in the field, Cota was promoted to major general (AUS) on September 4.

=== Western Europe ===
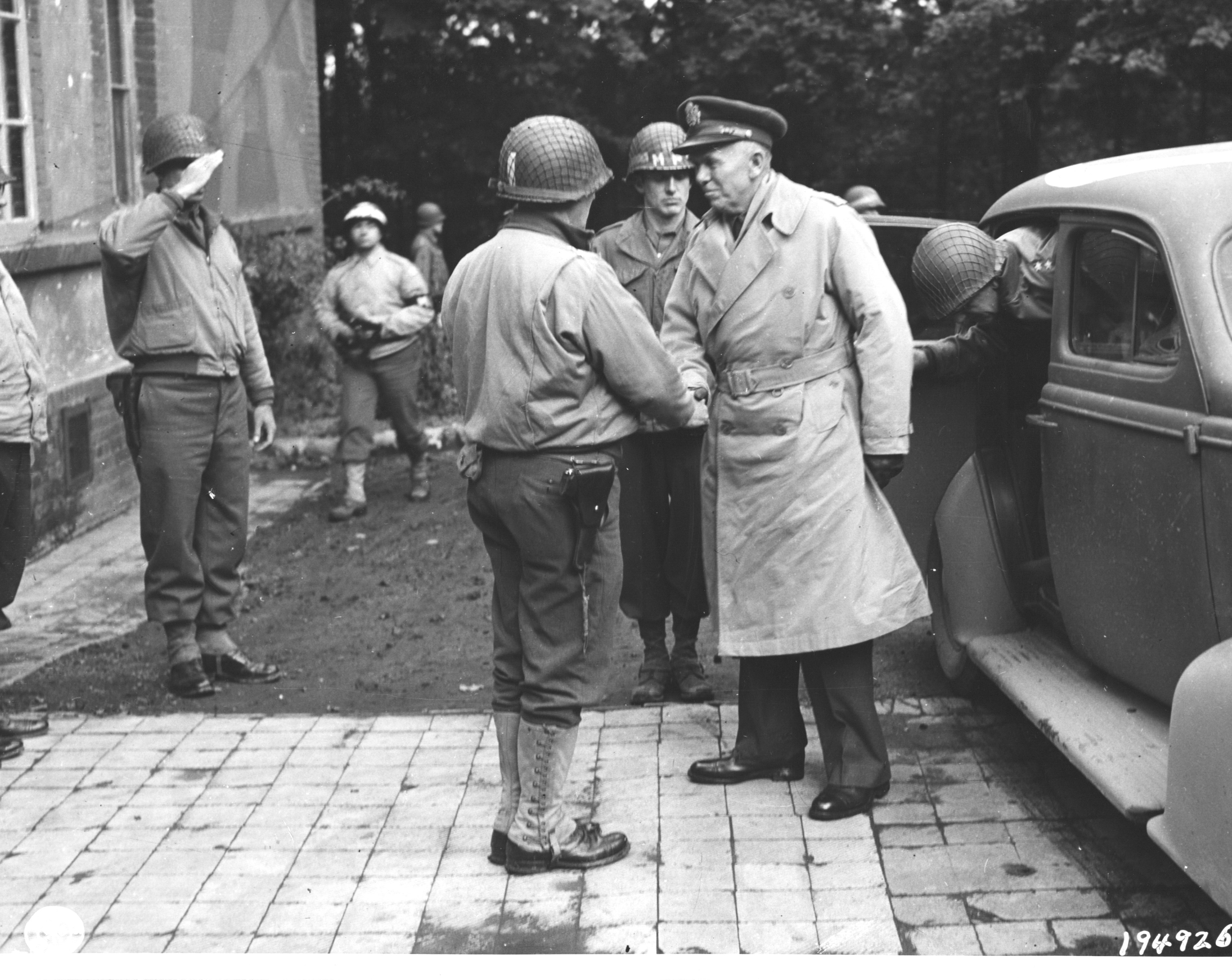
Major General Norman Cota greets General George C. Marshall, the U.S. Army Chief of Staff, on Marshall's arrival in Elsenborn, Belgium. October 22, 1944.

As the commanding general of the 28th Infantry Division, Major General Cota's division was involved in the Battle of Hürtgen Forest, conceived by Lieutenant General Omar Bradley, the U.S. 12th Army Group commander, as a direct assault on established German positions in the heavily forested region, positions which significantly favored the defenders. Cota was not pleased with the operations order he was given. It required him to send three regiments on diverging paths to three different objectives. Further, his division would be the only unit attacking on a 150 miles (240 km) front. His complaints were given little weight by his immediate superior, the V Corps commander, Major General Leonard Gerow.

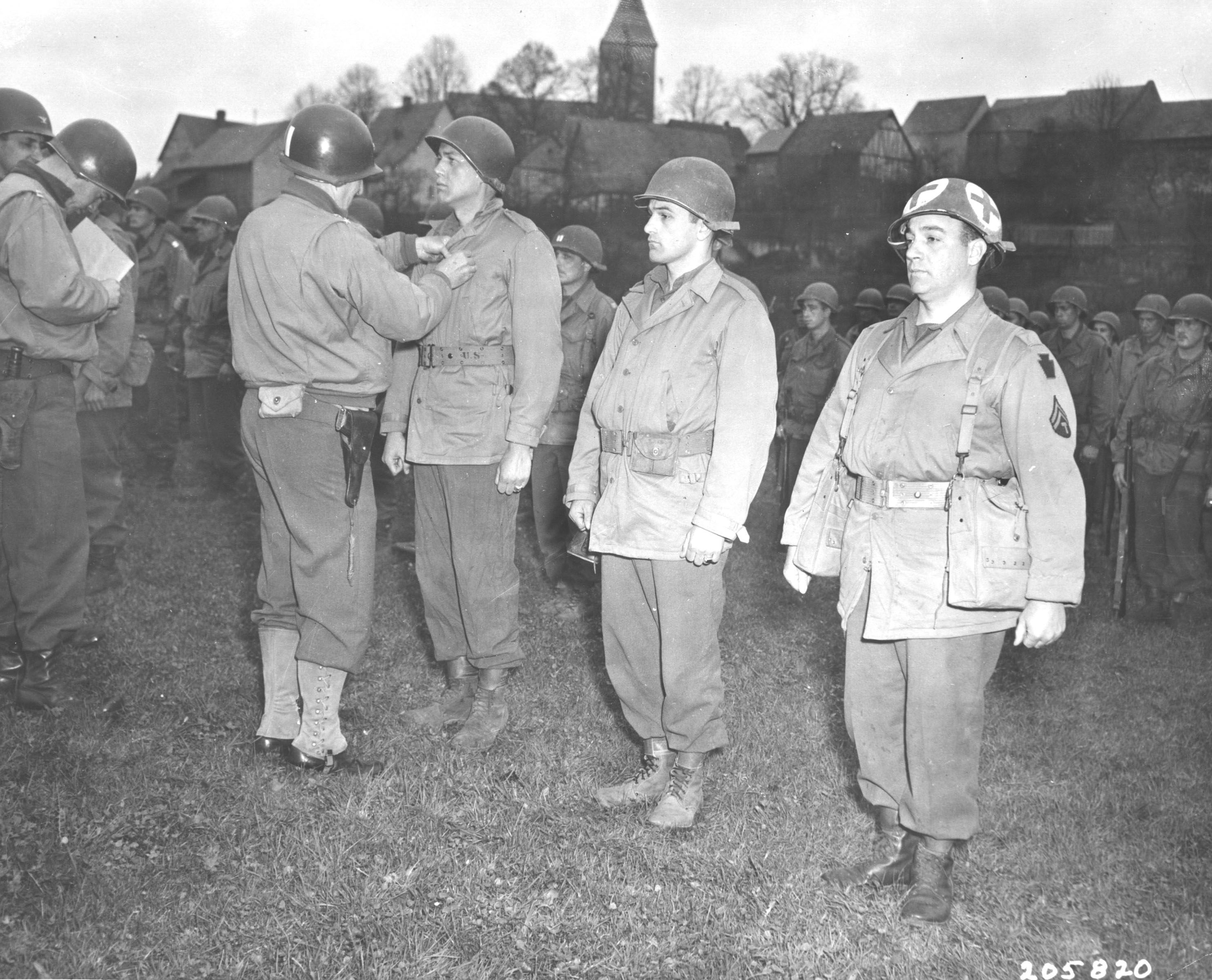
Major General Norman Cota presenting the Bronze Star to Corporal John H. Reese, Corporal Harry D. McMahan and Tec 5 Ernest Geibel, in Lahr, Germany, April 2, 1945.

The northern and southern thrusts achieved little. The center regiment, the 112th Infantry, captured two villages and a town, but was eventually driven back by German counterattacks. In an article written for the U.S. Army Combined Arms Center, Lieutenant Colonel (ret) Thomas Bradbeer identified "three crucial mistakes" that Cota made. First, neither he nor his staff ordered reconnaissance patrols. Second, he selected, sight unseen, an extremely narrow trail as the division's main supply route. Finally, he chose not to employ the extra armor units he was given in support of his infantry, believing the terrain and road system to be unsuitable for their use, whereas much of the forest was in fact accessible. Instead, the tanks were used as supplementary artillery. Furthermore, Lieutenant General Bradley criticized Cota for remaining in his command post, visiting the front only once late in the fighting, by which time he had already lost control of the situation.

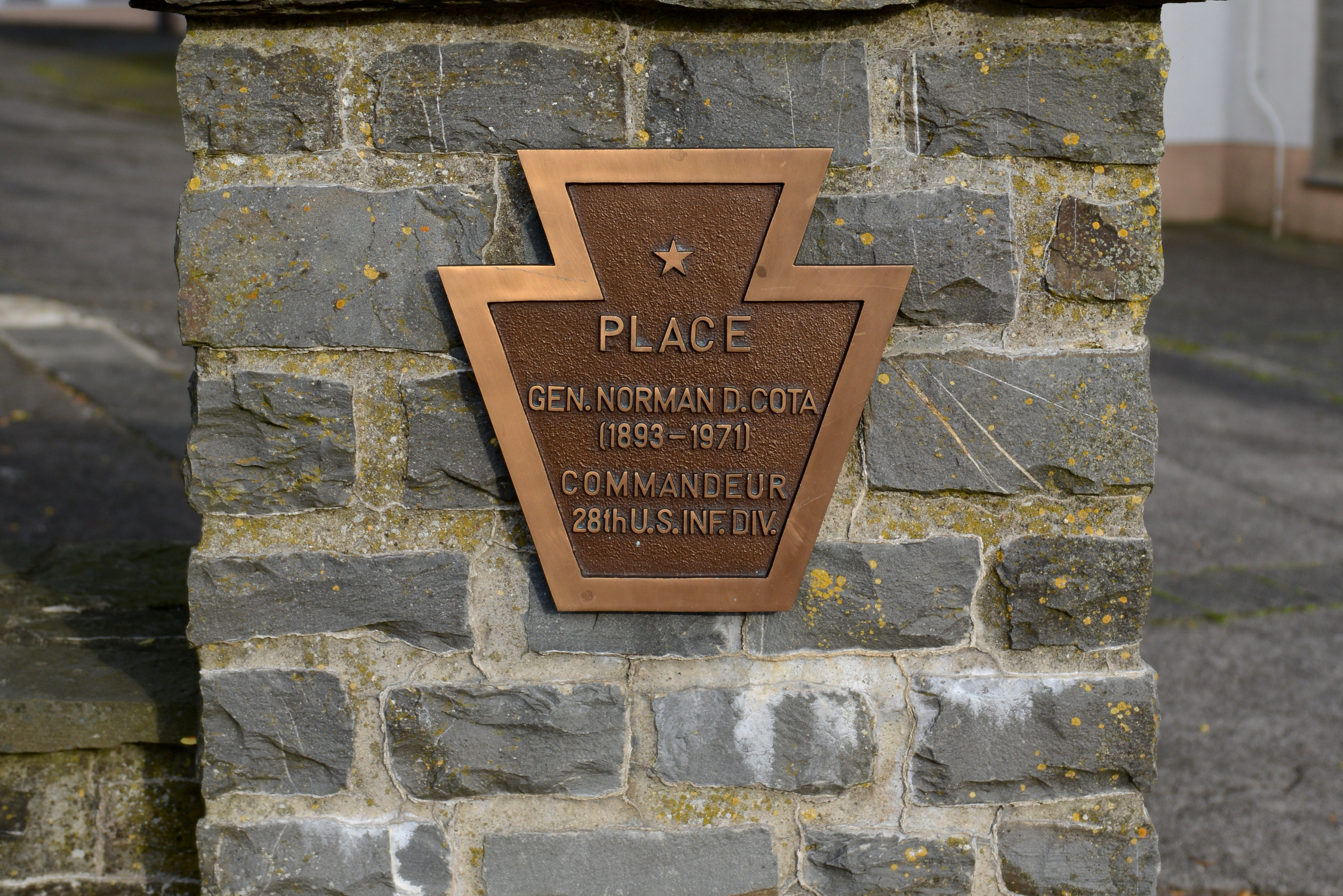
Norman Cota Square in Bourscheid, Luxembourg

Cota's division sustained heavy losses and failed to secure its objectives. The 28th Infantry Division and its attached units suffered 6,184 casualties; the 112th Infantry Regiment alone had 2,316 casualties out of a total strength of 3,100. While Cota retained command of the division to the end of the war, during which he led it in the Battle of the Bulge and invasion of Germany, he had lost his sterling military reputation and the confidence of his superiors, despite the fact that, before commencement of operations, he had voiced concerns regarding the plan to those same superiors.

The last three months of the war found the 28th pursuing retreating German forces east of the Rhine. When the war in Europe ended, Cota and the 28th were assigned occupation duties in the Cologne area. Later in 1945, the 28th assembled at Camp Shelby, Mississippi where the unit was inactivated on 13 December 1945.

=== Court martial and execution of Eddie Slovik ===
Cota also reviewed and approved the death sentence handed down by a court-martial on Private Eddie Slovik, who refused combat duty on October 8, 1944, and was executed on January 31, 1945. Cota said that the execution, the only American soldier to be executed for desertion since the American Civil War, was the "toughest 15 minutes of my life."

== Post-war ==
Cota hoped to remain on active duty after the war, and perhaps be promoted to Lieutenant General. He had sent several letters to the Army requesting a variety of duty assignments, but none of the letters were answered. With the war over and the army about to go through an enormous draw-down he was ordered to take a physical. Cota retired from the army on 30 June 1946 as a permanent major general.

In August, he was hired as administrator for Zone One of the War Assets Administration.

In the late 1950s, he was the civil defense director for Montgomery County, Pennsylvania.

He died in Wichita, Kansas, on 4 October 1971, and he is buried with his first wife Connie at the West Point Cemetery in West Point, New York.

== Personal life ==
Cota married writer and teacher Constance Martha "Connie" Alexander at the Episcopal Church of the Incarnation in New York City on November 1, 1919.

The Cotas were the parents of two children, Ann (23 October 1920 – 31 August 1996), the first girl born at the cadet hospital at West Point and Norman Daniel "Dan" Cota Jr. (15 December 1921 – 18 March 1988). Cota's son was a U.S. Army Air Corps fighter pilot and provided reconnaissance for the 28th Division during the Battle of Hürtgen Forest.

After his first wife's death in 1969, in October 1970 Cota married Alice Weeks-McCutcheon.

== Awards and decorations ==
Cota was awarded the Distinguished Service Cross (DSC), Distinguished Service Order (DSO) and Silver Star for his heroism on Omaha Beach. Field Marshal Sir Bernard L. Montgomery pinned the DSO on Cota. He received a Purple Heart and a second Silver Star in the attack at Saint-Lô.

Cota's decorations included:

Distinguished Service Cross
Army Distinguished Service Medal
Silver Star with oak leaf cluster
Legion of Merit with oak leaf cluster
Bronze Star with oak leaf cluster
Purple Heart
World War I Victory Medal
American Defense Service Medal
American Campaign Medal
European–African–Middle Eastern Campaign Medal with seven service stars and Arrowhead Device
World War II Victory Medal
Army of Occupation Medal
Distinguished Service Order (United Kingdom)
Officer of the Legion of Honour (France)
Croix de guerre 1939–1945 with Palm (France)
Croix de guerre 1940–1945 with Palm (Belgium)
Luxembourg War Cross

== Promotions ==
Insignia	Rank	Component	Date
No insignia	Cadet	United States Military Academy	June 14, 1913
	Second Lieutenant	Regular Army	April 20, 1917
	First Lieutenant	Regular Army	May 15, 1917
	Captain	National Army	August 5, 1917
	Major	Regular Army	September 9, 1918
	Captain	Regular Army	August 20, 1919
	Major	Regular Army	November 1, 1932
	Lieutenant Colonel	Regular Army	July 1, 1940
	Colonel	Army of the United States	December 11, 1941
	Brigadier General	Army of the United States	February 2, 1943
	Major General	Army of the United States	September 4, 1944
	Major General	Regular Army, Retired	June 30, 1946

== In popular culture ==
Cota is a central character in the film The Longest Day, a historical drama about the D-Day landings. In the film, Eddie Albert, who portrayed Colonel Lloyd Thompson spoke Cota's "let us go inland" quote. Robert Mitchum, who portrayed Cota, delivered another quote in his dialogue, one actually attributed to Colonel George A. Taylor: "There are only two kinds of people who are staying on this beach: those who are already dead and those that are gonna die. Now get off your butts, you guys are the fightin' 29th."

== Bibliography ==
- Miller, Robert A. (1989). Division Commander: A Biography of Major General Norman D. Cota. Reprint Company. ISBN 978-0871524386.
- Mehlo, Noel; Joseph, Balkoski (2021). Raan Jr.; John (eds.). D-Day General: How Dutch Cota Saved Omaha Beach on June 6, 1944. Stackpole Books. ISBN 978-0811739658.

Military offices
Preceded by James Wharton	Commanding General 28th Infantry Division; 1944–1945	Succeeded by Edward J. Stackpole
