= USS Blue =

USS Blue has been the name of two ships of the United States Navy:

- USS Blue (DD-387), a Bagley-class destroyer named for Rear Admiral Victor Blue (1865–1928), which served from 1937 until sunk in combat in 1942.
- USS Blue (DD-744), an Allen M. Sumner-class destroyer named for Lieutenant Commander John S. Blue (1902–1942), which served from 1944 until 1974.
