= 349th Regiment =

349th Regiment may refer to:

- 349th Field Artillery Regiment, United States
- 349th Infantry Regiment, United States
