= Vulnerability of Pearl Harbor in 1941 =

Known susceptibility to attack

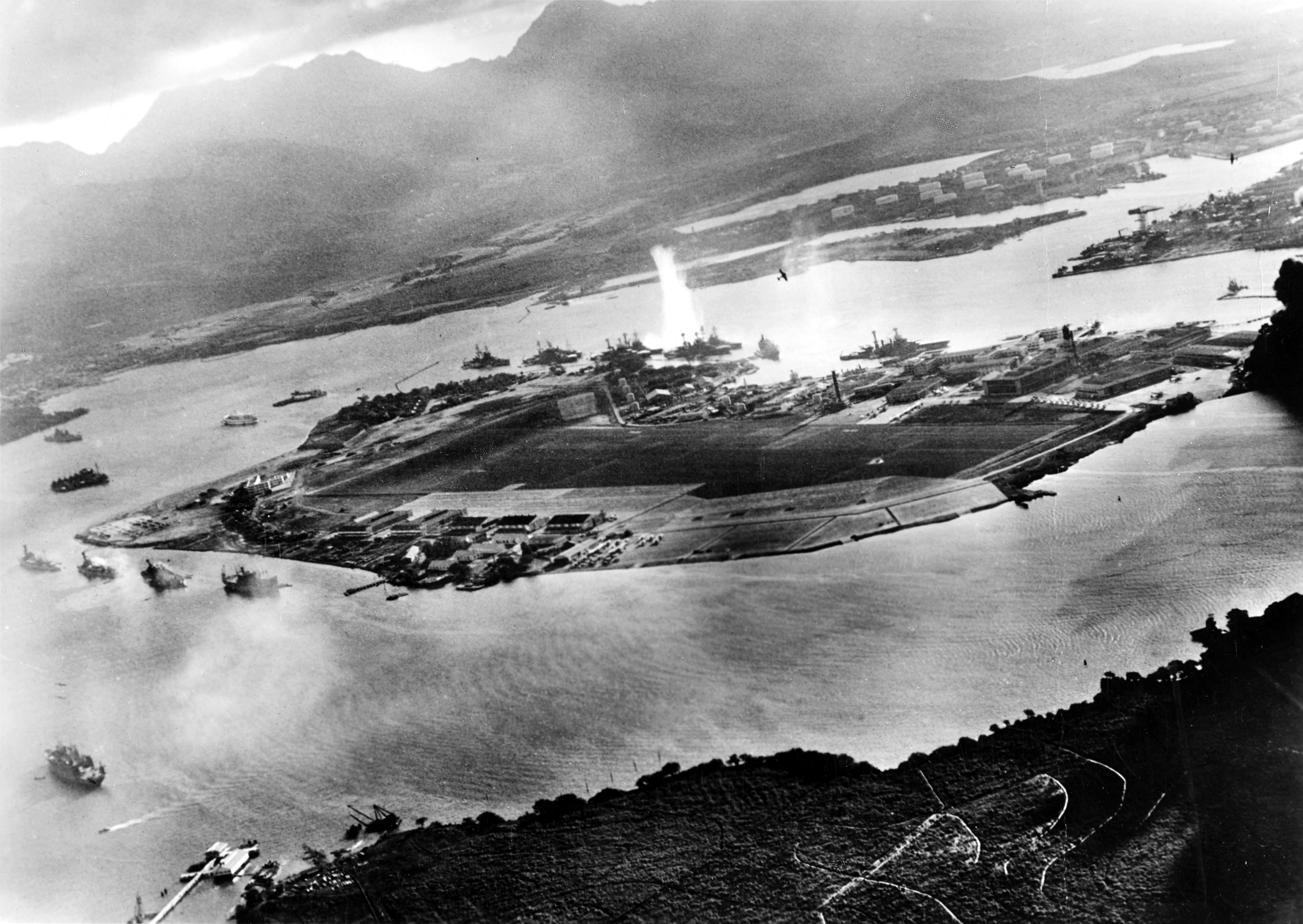
Pearl Harbor as viewed by Japanese planes during the attack

Several reports prior to Japan's attack on Pearl Harbor in 1941 indicated that the base was vulnerable to attack. This has sometimes been noted in Pearl Harbor advance-knowledge conspiracy theories.

== Perceived threat to Pearl Harbor ==
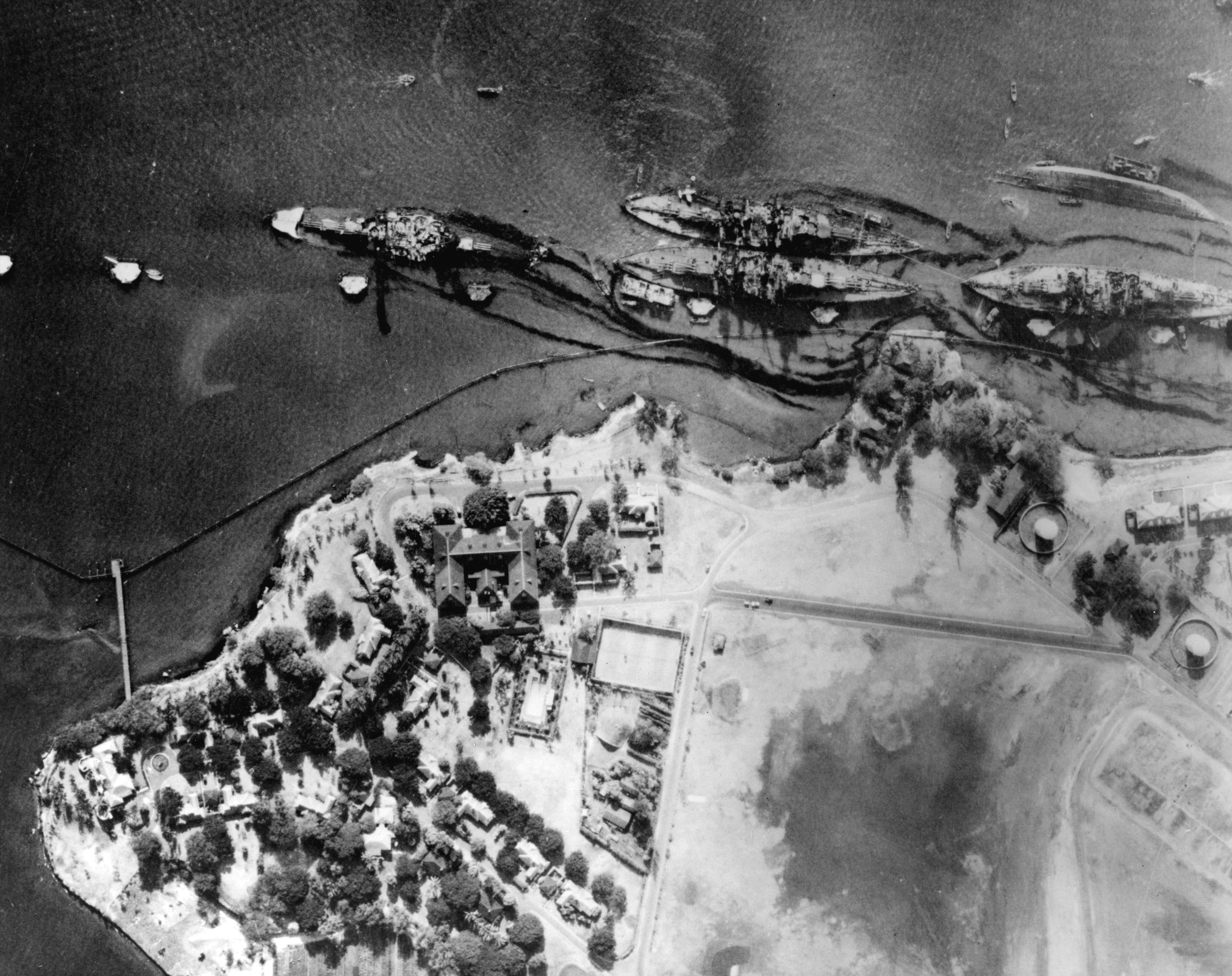
Battleship Row at Pearl Harbor after the attack

In 1925, Gen. Billy Mitchell published a report called Winged Defense revealing the vulnerability of Pearl Harbor to a surprise air attack. Mitchell predicted that such an attack would effectively neutralize the Pacific fleet as part of a Japanese invasion of the Philippines.

Two mock air attacks on Pearl Harbor during war games in the 1930s were judged to have been a success. Shortly after taking office, Navy Secretary Knox wrote an overview memo which specifically noted the possibility of an attack at Pearl Harbor. However, neither observation led to formal policy recommendations to forestall such an attack. Admiral James O. Richardson, who was fired by President Roosevelt for complaining about the President's order to station the Pacific Fleet in Pearl Harbor instead of its normal berthing on the U.S. West Coast, blamed the President for the "initial defeats in the Pacific" as "direct, real and personal." Richardson believed stationing the fleet in Pearl Harbor made the ships extremely vulnerable against attack and provided a poor and unstrategic defense.

== Development of torpedoes ==
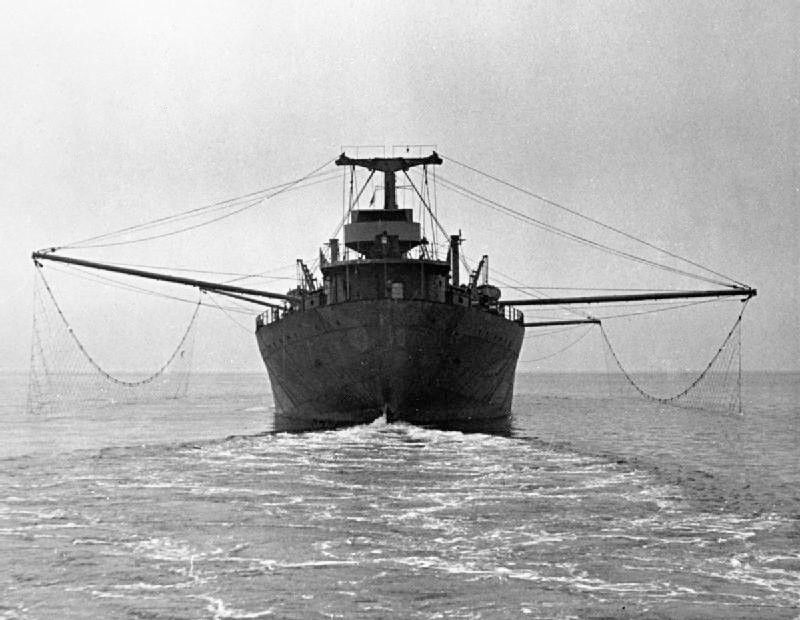
British ship with deployed torpedo nets during WWII

The British proved that torpedoes could be effective in their attack on the Regia Marina at Taranto on November 11, 1940. The U.S. Navy discussed this new development as can be seen in a June 1941 memo. The British attack method was not considered relevant to a torpedo attack at Pearl, as Taranto was about 75 ft (23 m) deep and Pearl less than 40 ft (12 m).

The Royal Navy had used Swordfish torpedo biplanes, and their low speed was part of the reason the Taranto attack succeeded. The Imperial Japanese Navy no longer had any similar planes, so they had to develop other methods, both hardware and delivery technique. They independently developed shallow water torpedo modifications (called "Thunder Fish") during the planning and training for the attack in 1941. Wooden fins were added to the tail and anti-roll "flippers" kept the torpedo upright once in the water. The fins kept the torpedo's nose level in the air and broke off on entering the water. The flatter "flight" trajectory helped keep them from diving so deeply as to encounter bottom mud. (Despite these modifications, some Japanese torpedoes did indeed reach the bottom and several remain unaccounted for.) These simple modifications were not anticipated by the USN, and Admiral Claude C. Bloch (commander of the Pearl Harbor Naval District) did not push to install torpedo nets or baffles at Pearl. Nor, it seems, did anyone else. Practical considerations also were an influence. Due to the shallow anchorage (which continues to require regular dredging), installation of torpedo nets would have severely restricted the mobility of vessels in the harbor.

Kimmel and his staff testified regarding torpedo nets and booms: "(m) Fact XV ... The decision not to install baffles appears to have been made by the Navy Department." That is, in Washington, DC, rather than in Hawaii.
