= USS Texas (BB-35) =

Dreadnought battleship of the United States Navy

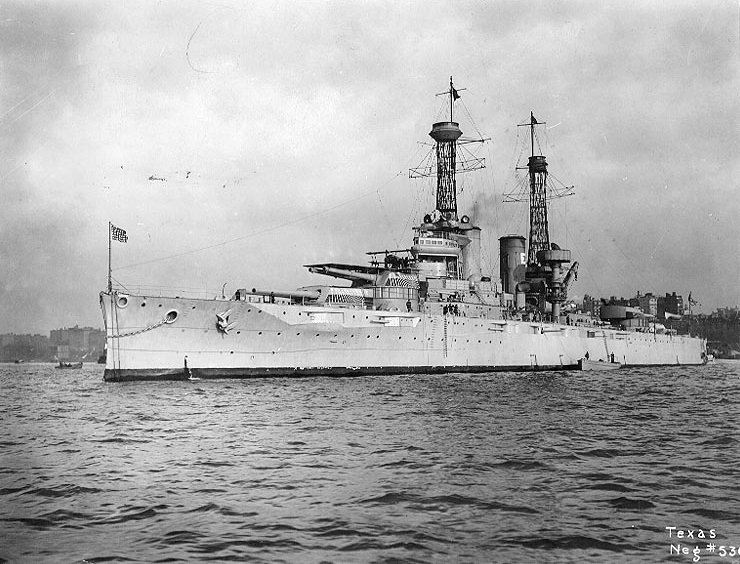
- USS Texas (BB-35), off New York City c. 1919

History

United States
- Name: Texas
- Namesake: State of Texas
- Ordered: 24 June 1910
- Builder: Newport News Shipbuilding
- Laid down: 17 April 1911
- Launched: 18 May 1912
- Commissioned: 12 March 1914
- Decommissioned: 21 April 1948
- Stricken: 30 April 1948
- Status: Museum ship

General characteristics
- Class & type: New York-class battleship
- Displacement: 27,000 long tons (27,433 t) (standard); 28,367 long tons (28,822 t) (full load)
- Length: 573 ft (175 m) (overall); 565 ft (172 m) (waterline)
- Beam: 95 ft 2.5 in (29.020 m)
- Draft: 28 ft 6 in (8.69 m) (mean); 29 ft 7 in (9.02 m) (max)
- Installed power: 14 × Babcock & Wilcox water-tube boilers; 28,100 shp (20,954 kW) (As-built); 6 x Bureau Express oil-fired boilers (1925)
- Propulsion: 2 × triple-expansion steam engines; 2 × screw propellers
- Speed: 21 kn (39 km/h)
- Range: 7,060 nmi (13,075 km; 8,125 mi) at 10 kn (19 km/h)
- Complement: 1,042 officers and men
- Armament: 5x2 × 14 in (356 mm)/45 caliber guns; 21 × 5 in (127 mm)/51 caliber guns; 4 × 3-pounder 47 mm (1.85 in)/40 caliber saluting guns; 2 × 1-pounder 37 mm (1.46 in) guns; 4 × 21 in (533 mm) torpedo tubes (submerged)
- Armor: Belt: 6–12 in (152–305 mm); Bulkheads: 10 to 11 in (254 to 279 mm); Barbettes: 5–12 in (127–305 mm); Turrets: 14 in (356 mm) (face); Decks: 1.5–3 in (38–76 mm); Conning tower: 12 in

General characteristics (1945)
- Complement: 1,810 officers and men
- Sensors & processing systems: 2 × SG surface search radars; 1 × SK air search radar; 2 × Mk 3 fire control radar; 2 × Mk 10 fire control radar
- Armament: 5x2 × 14 in/45 caliber guns; 6 × 5 in/51 caliber guns; 10 × 3 in/50 caliber gun; 10 × quad 40 mm Bofors AA guns; 44 × single 20 mm Oerlikon AA guns
- Armor: Turrets: 1.75 in (44 mm) added to turret tops
- Aircraft carried: 2 × OS2U Kingfisher
- Aviation facilities: 1 × catapult
- USS Texas
- U.S. National Register of Historic Places
- U.S. National Historic Landmark
- Location within Texas Location within the United States
- Location: Galveston, Texas in drydock for repairs.
- Coordinates: 29°18′53″N 94°47′44″W
- NRHP reference No.: 76002039

Significant dates
- Added to NRHP: 8 December 1976
- Designated NHL: 8 December 1976

USS Texas (BB-35) is a museum ship in Galveston, Texas, and former United States Navy New York-class battleship. She was launched on 18 May 1912 and commissioned on 12 March 1914. She is the oldest surviving dreadnought battleship.

Texas served in Mexican waters following the "Tampico Incident" but saw no action there, and made numerous sorties into the North Sea during World War I without engaging the enemy, though she did fire for the first time when shooting medium-caliber guns at supposed submarines (no evidence exists that suggests these were anything more than waves). From September 1927 to September 1931, Texas became the flagship of the United States Fleet, one of only four ships to be designated U.S. Fleet flagships from 1922 to 1941. (Note: The other three flagships were USS Maryland (BB-46) from 1922–23, USS Seattle (CA-11) (former USS Washington (ACR-11)) from 1923–27, and USS Pennsylvania (BB-38) from 1931–41.) In World War II, Texas escorted war convoys across the Atlantic and later shelled Vichy French forces in the North African Landings and German-held beaches in the Normandy Landings before being transferred to the Pacific Theater late in 1944 to provide naval gunfire support during the Battles of Iwo Jima and Okinawa. She was the only Allied battleship that took part in all four of these amphibious landings. Texas was decommissioned in 1948, having earned a total of five battle stars for service in World War II.

Texas was also a technological testbed: the first U.S. battleship to mount anti-aircraft guns, the first U.S. warship to control gunfire with directors and range-keepers, the first U.S. battleship to launch an aircraft, and one of the first U.S. Navy warships to receive production radar. She was the first battleship in the world to be outfitted with 14-inch guns. (Note: Japan's Kongō-class warships were outfitted with 14-inch guns. Kongō was commissioned with 14-inch guns before Texas but she and her sister ships were battlecruisers, not battleships. Battlecruisers had much weaker armor than battleships. The Kongō-class battlecruisers were not converted into battleships until the 1930s.)

Texas was the first U.S. battleship to become a permanent museum ship; she was turned over to the state of Texas on 21 April 1948 as a permanent museum in Houston. (Note: The first steel battleship to become a permanent museum ship was Mikasa; the first U.S. battleship to become a museum ship was Oregon. However, Oregon was placed on loan to the state of Oregon, and at the outbreak of World War II, she was offered back into service and later sunk and scrapped. As a result, Texas is the first permanent U.S. battleship museum ship.) In 1976 she became the first battleship to be declared a U.S. National Historic Landmark. She is one of the seven remaining ships and the only remaining capital ship to have served in both World Wars. (Note: The other six surviving vessels that hold the distinction of serving in both world wars are Medea, which served both the French Navy and Royal Navy, the British monitor HMS M33, the British light cruiser HMS Caroline, the Greek armored cruiser Georgios Averof, the Bulgarian torpedo boat Drazki and the former HMCS Acadia, a Canadian hydrographic research ship and auxiliary patrol vessel.) Texas is owned by the people of Texas and is officially under the jurisdiction of the Texas Parks and Wildlife Department. Everyday operations and maintenance of Texas have been handled by the non-profit organization Battleship Texas Foundation since August 2020. At the end of August 2022 she was moved to a dry dock in Galveston, Texas, to undergo a $60 million repair project. On completion, her new permanent home will be Galveston. As of June 2025, the repair project is still underway, but she has moved out of dry dock and is in final stages of restoration.

== Construction ==
The United States Congress authorized the construction of Texas, the second Navy ship to be named after that state, on 24 June 1910. Bids for Texas were accepted from 27 September to 1 December with the winning bid of $5,830,000—excluding the price of armor and armament—submitted by Newport News Shipbuilding. The contract was signed on 17 December and the plans were delivered to the building yard seven days later. Texas's keel was laid down on 17 April 1911 at Newport News, Virginia. She was launched on 18 May 1912, sponsored by Miss Claudia Lyon, daughter of Colonel Cecil Lyon, Republican national committeeman from Texas. The ship was commissioned on 12 March 1914 with Captain Albert W. Grant in command.

Texas's main battery consisted of ten 14-inch (356 mm)/45 caliber Mark 1 guns, which could fire 1,400 lb (635 kg) armor-piercing shells to a range of 13 mi (11 nmi; 21 km). Her secondary battery consisted of twenty-one 5-inch (127 mm)/51-caliber guns. She also mounted four 21-inch (533 mm) torpedo tubes for the Bliss-Leavitt Mark 8 torpedo, one each on the port-side bow and stern and starboard bow and stern. The torpedo rooms held 12 torpedoes total, plus 12 naval defense mines. Texas and her sister New York were the only battleships to store and hoist their 14-inch ammunition in cast-iron cups, nose-down.

== Service history ==
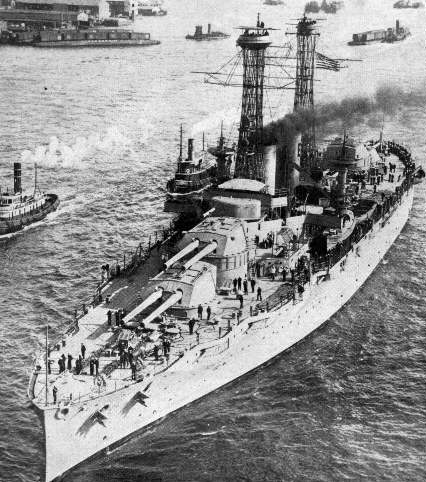
Texas in World War I (after July 1916 and before October 1917): The two large steel towers are her lattice masts, which were replaced with a tripod version during her modernization overhaul in 1925–1926.

On 24 March 1914, Texas departed Norfolk Navy Yard and set a course for New York City, making an overnight stop at Tompkinsville, New York, on the night of 26 March. Entering New York Navy Yard on the next day, she spent the next three weeks there undergoing the installation of fire-control equipment.

During his stay in New York, President Woodrow Wilson ordered a number of ships of the Atlantic Fleet to Mexican waters in response to tension created when a detail of Mexican federal troops detained an American gunboat crew at Tampico. The problem was quickly resolved locally, but Rear Admiral Henry T. Mayo sought further redress by demanding an official disavowal of the act by the Huerta regime and a 21-gun salute to the American flag.

President Wilson saw in the incident an opportunity to put pressure on a government he felt was undemocratic. On 20 April, Wilson placed the matter before the United States Congress and sent orders to Rear Admiral Frank Friday Fletcher, commanding the naval force off the Mexican coast, instructing him to land a force at Veracruz and to seize the customs house there in retaliation for what is now known as the "Tampico Incident". That action was carried out on 21–22 April.

Due to the intensity of the situation, Texas put to sea on 13 May and headed directly to operational duty without benefit of the usual shakedown cruise and post-shakedown repair period. After a five-day stop at Hampton Roads from 14 to 19 May, she joined Rear Admiral Fletcher's force off Veracruz on 26 May. She remained in Mexican waters for just over two months, supporting the American forces ashore. On 8 August, she left Veracruz and set a course for Nipe Bay, Cuba, and from there steamed to New York, where she entered the Navy Yard on 21 August.

The battleship remained there until 6 September, when she returned to sea, joined the Atlantic Fleet, and settled into a schedule of normal fleet operations. In October, she returned to the Mexican coast. Later that month, Texas became station ship at Tuxpan, a duty that lasted until 4 November, when she steamed for Galveston, Texas. While at Galveston on 7 November, Texas Governor Oscar Colquitt presented the ship's silver service to Captain Grant. The Young Men's Business League of Waco, Texas, raised the $10,000 to purchase the silver.

Texas sailed for Tampico on 14 November and thereafter to Veracruz, where she remained for a month. The ship left Mexico on 20 December and set a course for New York. The battleship entered New York Navy Yard on 28 December and remained there undergoing repairs until 16 February 1915. On 25 May, Texas, along with battleships South Carolina, Louisiana, and Michigan, rescued 230 passengers from the damaged Holland America Line passenger ship Ryndam, which had been rammed by Norwegian-flagged fruit steamer Joseph J. Cuneo. In gratitude, Holland America Line presented Texas with a model of a 17th-century warship, which is displayed with the wardroom silver as of 2014. In 1916, Texas became the first U.S. battleship to mount anti-aircraft guns with the addition of two 3-inch (76 mm)/50-caliber guns on platforms atop the boat cranes, and the first to control gunfire with directors and rangefinders, analog forerunners of today's computers. (Note: HMS Benbow was the first battleship to fit anti-aircraft guns, in 1914.)

=== World War I ===
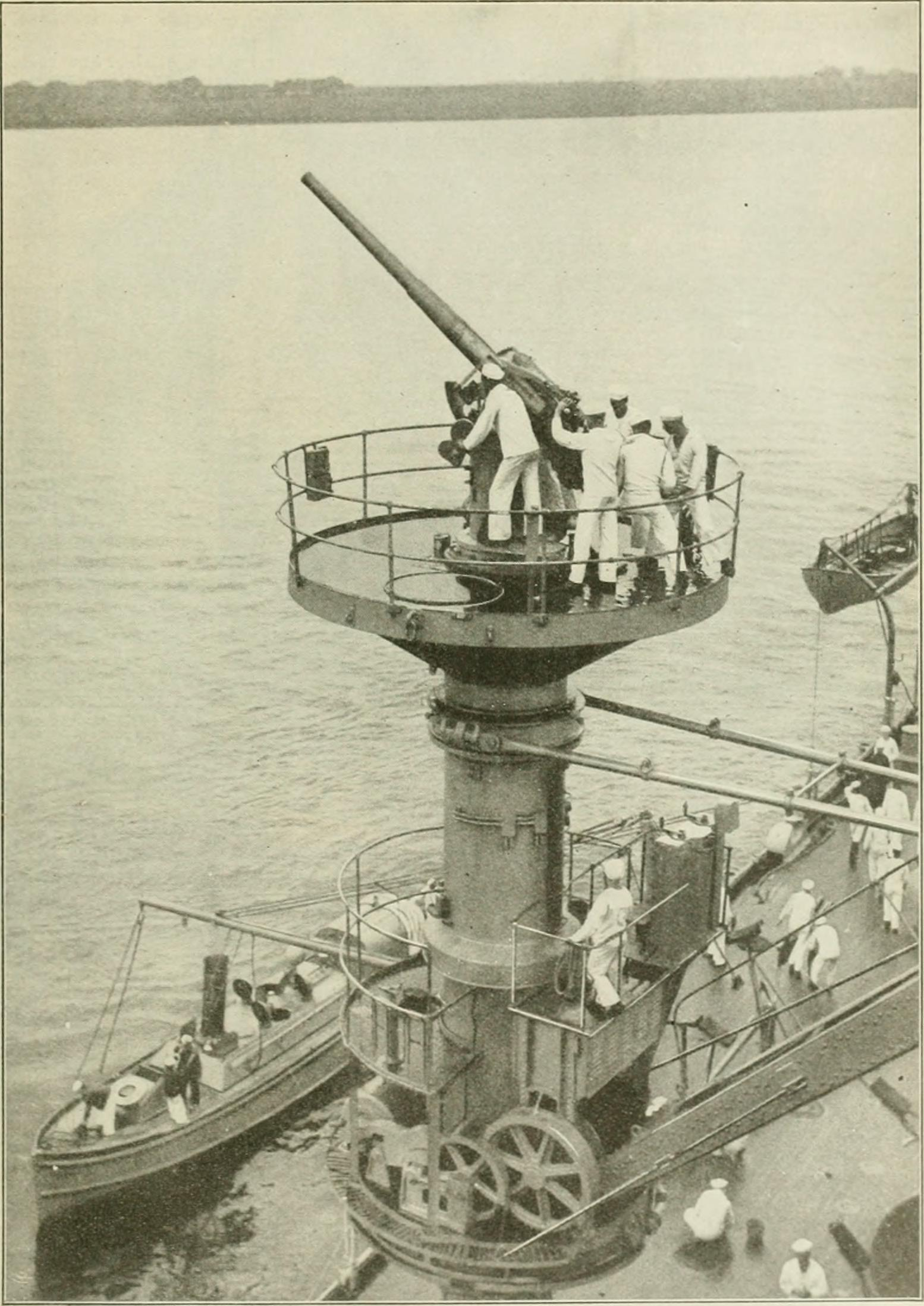
3"/50 caliber antiaircraft gun on platform atop a boat crane on Texas, installed in 1916 and said to be the first AA gun installation on a U.S. battleship

Upon her return to active duty with the fleet, Texas resumed a schedule alternating between training operations along the New England coast and off the Virginia Capes and winter fleet tactical and gunnery drills in the West Indies. That routine lasted just over two years until the February-to-March crisis over unrestricted submarine warfare catapulted the U.S. into World War I in April 1917. The 6 April declaration of war found Texas riding at anchor in the mouth of the York River with the other Atlantic Fleet battleships. She remained in the Virginia Capes–Hampton Roads vicinity until mid-August, conducting exercises and training Naval Armed Guard gun crews for service onboard merchant ships. One of the gun crews trained aboard Texas was assigned to the merchant vessel Mongolia at the beginning of the war. On 19 April, the crew of Mongolia sighted a surfaced German U-boat and the gun crew trained aboard Texas opened fire on the U-boat, averting an attack on Mongolia and firing the first American shots of World War I.

In August, she steamed to New York for repairs, arriving at Base 10 (Note: This was most likely a facility in the New York area for offloading ammunition prior to a repair period, probably associated with the Lake Denmark Naval Ammunition Depot in New Jersey.) on 19 August and entering the New York Navy Yard soon thereafter. She completed repairs on 26 September and got underway for Port Jefferson that same day. During the mid-watch on 27 September, she ran hard aground on Block Island. Captain Victor Blue and his navigator, confused about shore lights and more concerned about the minefield at the opening of Long Island Sound, made the turn at the wrong time and ran the ship aground on the island from the bow all the way aft beyond midships. For three days, her crew lightened ship to no avail. On 30 September, tugs came to her assistance, and she finally backed clear. Hull damage dictated a return to the yard, and extensive repairs precluded her departure with Battleship Division 9 for the British Isles in November. The secondary battery was reduced to eighteen 5-inch guns in October 1917. Captain Blue, a protege of Navy Secretary Josephus Daniels, was never court-martialed and remained in command of Texas. The Navy Department held his navigator entirely responsible for the accident.

By December, she had completed repairs and moved south to conduct military simulations out of the York River. Mid-January 1918 found the battleship back at New York preparing for the voyage across the Atlantic, including the removal of two more 5-inch guns, reducing the total number aboard to 16. She departed New York on 30 January 1918, arrived at Scapa Flow in the Orkney Islands off the coast of Scotland on 11 February, and rejoined Battleship Division 9, by then known as the 6th Battle Squadron of Britain's Grand Fleet.

Texas's service with the Grand Fleet consisted entirely of convoy missions and occasional forays to reinforce the British squadron on blockade duty in the North Sea whenever German heavy units threatened. The fleet alternated between bases at Scapa Flow and at the Firth of Forth in Scotland. Texas began her mission five days after her arrival at Scapa Flow, when she sortied with the entire fleet to reinforce the 4th Battle Squadron, then on duty in the North Sea. She returned to Scapa Flow the next day and remained until 8 March, when she put to sea on a convoy escort mission from which she returned on 13 March. Texas and her division mates entered the Firth of Forth on 12 April, but got underway again on the 17th to escort a convoy. The American battleships returned to base on 20 April. Four days later, Texas again stood out to sea to support the Second Battle Squadron the day after the German High Seas Fleet had sortied from Jade Bay toward the Norwegian coast to threaten an Allied convoy. Forward units caught sight of the retiring Germans on 25 April, but at such an extreme range, bringing the German fleet into engagement with the Grand Fleet was not possible. The Germans returned to their base that day, and the Grand Fleet, including Texas, did likewise on the next.

Texas and her division mates passed a relatively inactive May in the Firth of Forth. On 9 June, she got underway with the other warships of the 6th Battle Squadron and headed back to the anchorage at Scapa Flow, arriving there the following day. From 30 June to 2 July, Texas and her colleagues acted as escort for American minelayers adding to the North Sea Mine Barrage. After a two-day return to Scapa Flow, Texas put to sea with the Grand Fleet to conduct two days of tactical exercises and war games. At the conclusion of those drills on 8 July, the fleet entered the Firth of Forth. For the remainder of World War I, Texas and the other battleships of Division 9 continued to operate with the Grand Fleet as the 6th Battle Squadron. With the German Fleet increasingly tied to its bases in the estuaries of the Jade and the Ems rivers, the American and British ships settled into a routine schedule of operations with little-to-no hint of combat operations. That state of affairs lasted until the Armistice ended hostilities on 11 November 1918. At 03:35 on 21 November, she got underway to accompany the Grand Fleet to meet the surrendering German Fleet. The two fleets rendezvoused about 40 nmi (46 mi; 74 km) east of the Isle of May and proceeded to the Firth of Forth. Afterward, the American contingent moved to Portland Harbour, England, arriving there on 4 December.

=== Inter-war period ===
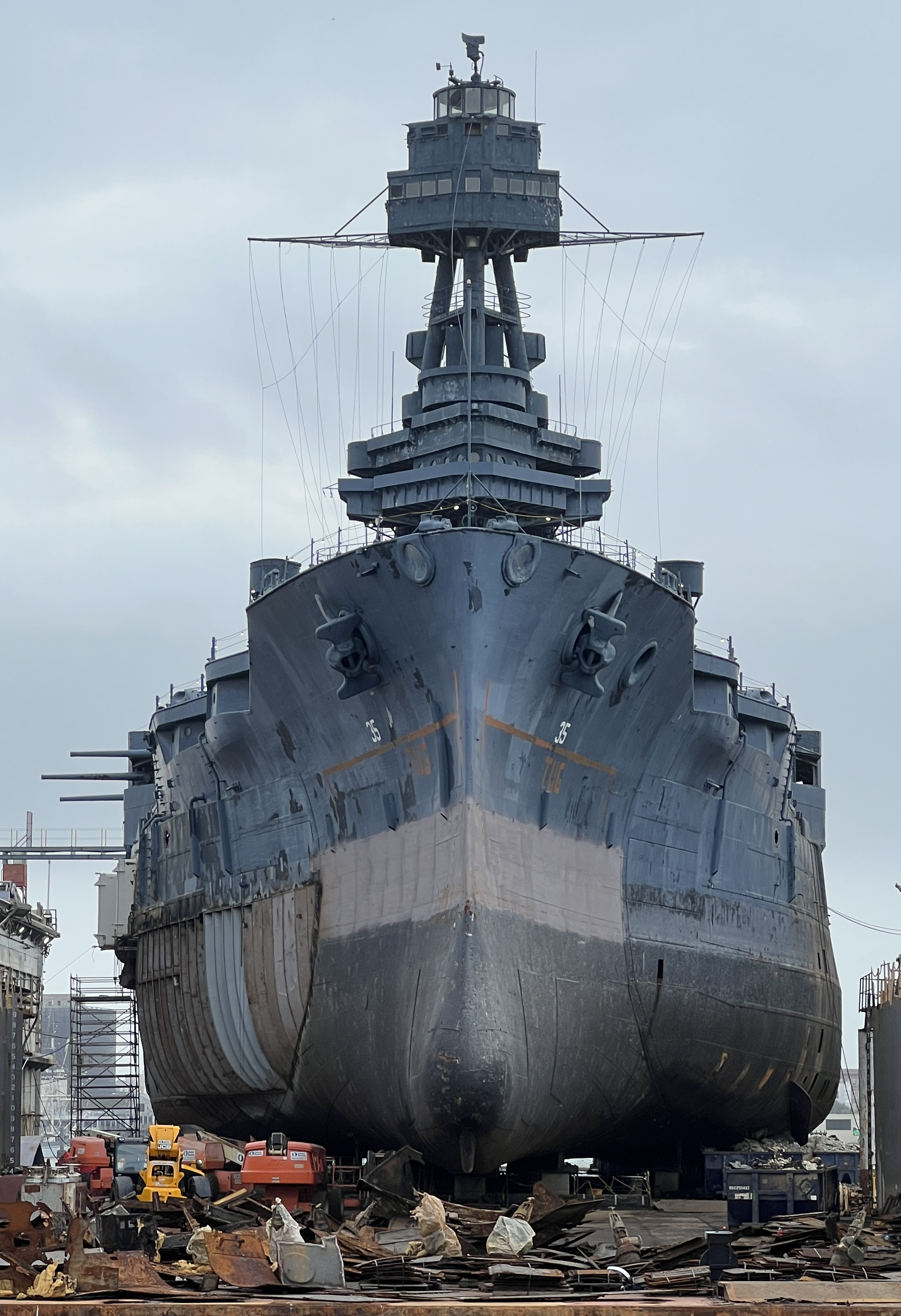
USS Texas with the starboard torpedo blister removed, revealing the original hull and narrower profile when built; the torpedo blisters were added during the 1926 modernization.

On 12 December 1918, Texas put to sea with Battleship Divisions 9 and 6 to meet President Woodrow Wilson embarked in George Washington on his way to the Paris Peace Conference. The rendezvous took place around 07:30 the following morning and provided an escort for the President into Brest, France, where the ships arrived at 12:30 that afternoon. On the afternoon of 14 December, Texas and the other American battleships departed Brest to return to the United States. The warships arrived off Ambrose light station on Christmas Day, 1918, and entered New York the next day.

Following overhaul, Texas resumed duty with the Atlantic Fleet early in 1919. On 10 March, she became the first American battleship to launch an airplane when Lieutenant Commander Edward O. McDonnell flew a British-built Sopwith Camel off the warship at Guantanamo Bay. Later in 1919 Texas's captain, Nathan C. Twining, successfully employed naval aircraft to spot the fall of shells during a main battery exercise. The results were that aircraft-borne gunfire spotters were significantly more accurate than shipboard spotters. In testimony to the Navy General Board, Lieutenant Commander Kenneth Whiting attested that the increase in gunfire effectiveness with air spotting was likely to be as great as 200 percent. As a result of these first experiments, the Navy would add floatplanes to all of the fleet's battleships and newer cruisers. In May 1919, Texas served as a plane guard and navigational aid for the successful attempt by Navy Curtiss NC flying boat NC-4 to become the first airplane to cross the Atlantic. On 26 July 1919 Texas entered the Pacific Ocean as part of the newly formed Pacific Fleet and she would spend the next five and half years as a part of Pacific Fleet. On 17 July the following year, she was designated BB-35 under the Navy's newly adopted alpha-numeric system of hull classification symbols.

Texas left the Pacific on 16 January 1924 and returned to the east coast for overhaul and to participate in a training cruise to European waters with Naval Academy Midshipmen embarked. While operating in the Atlantic, on 25 November 1924, she sank the incomplete battleship Washington in compliance with the Naval Arms Limitation Treaty of 1922, and later that fall, conducted maneuvers as a unit of the Scouting Fleet. On 31 July 1925, she entered Norfolk Navy Yard for a major modernization overhaul. The overhaul, which replaced both cage masts with tripod masts, replaced her 14 Babcock & Wilcox coal-fired boilers with 6 Bureau Express oil-fired boilers, added anti-torpedo bulges and upgraded her fire-control equipment, was completed on 23 November 1926. Also, her AA armament was increased to eight 3-inch guns, and the torpedo tubes were removed. Six of the 5-inch guns were relocated to new main deck casemates at this time. Following completion of her overhaul, Texas was designated the flagship of the United States Fleet and resumed duty along the eastern seaboard. She kept at that task until late 1927, when she did a brief tour of duty in the Pacific from late September-early December. In 1927, Texas set another first with the showing of "talking" pictures for crew entertainment. Near the end of the year, Texas returned to the Atlantic and resumed normal duty with the Scouting Fleet. In January 1928, she transported President Calvin Coolidge to Havana, Cuba, for the Pan-American Conference and then continued on via the Panama Canal and the west coast to maneuvers with the fleet near Hawaii.

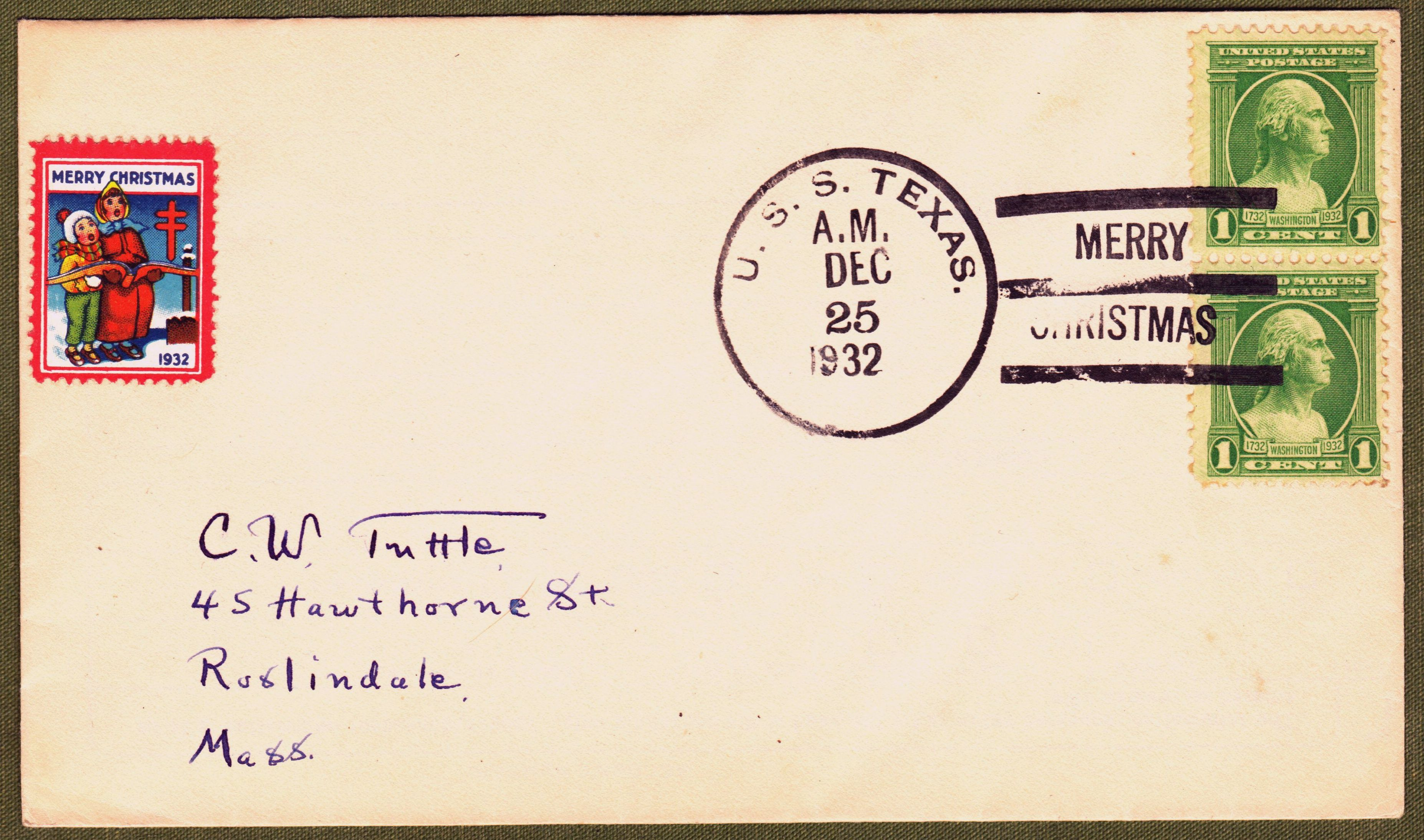
Naval ships have their own post office and postmaster aboard. Christmas Postmark from Texas during interwar period.

She returned to New York early in 1929 for her annual overhaul and had completed it by March when she began another brief tour of duty in the Pacific. She returned to the Atlantic in June and resumed normal duty with the Scouting Fleet. In April 1930, she took time from her operating schedule to escort Leviathan into New York when that ship carried the returning U.S. delegation to the London Naval Conference. In January 1931, she left the yard at New York as flagship of the United States Fleet and headed via the Panama Canal to San Diego, California, and then on to Los Angeles (port of San Pedro) which became her home port for the next six years and three months. There would be a temporary redeployment back to the Atlantic from April to October 1934. During this Pacific period, she served first as flagship for the entire Fleet and, later, as flagship for Battleship Division 1.

In the summer of 1937, she once more was reassigned to the east coast, as the flagship of the Training Detachment, United States Fleet. Late in 1938 or early in 1939, the warship became flagship of the newly organized Atlantic Squadron, built around Battleship Division 5. Through both organizational assignments, her labors were directed primarily to training missions, Midshipman cruises, Naval Reserve drills, and training members of the Fleet Marine Force. Also in 1937, eight 1.1-inch (28 mm) AA guns in two quadruple mounts were added to improve the light AA armament. In December 1938, Texas received for testing the first shipborne radar designed and made by a commercial company, RCA, for the U.S. Navy, the 385 MHz CXZ. In 1941, Texas was one of fourteen ships to receive the RCA CXAM-1 radar.

=== World War II ===
==== Early operations ====
Soon after war broke out in Europe in September 1939, Texas began operating on the Neutrality Patrol, an American attempt to keep the war out of the Western Hemisphere. Later, as the United States moved toward more active support of the Allied cause, the warship began convoying ships carrying Lend-Lease material to the United Kingdom. In February 1941, the U.S. 1st Marine Division was activated aboard Texas. On 1 February, Admiral Ernest J. King hoisted his flag as Commander-in-Chief of the re-formed Atlantic Fleet aboard Texas. That same year, while on Neutrality Patrol in the Atlantic, Texas was stalked unsuccessfully by the German submarine U-203.

On Sunday, 7 December 1941, the day of the attack on Pearl Harbor, the battleship was at Casco Bay, Maine, undergoing a rest and relaxation period following three months of watch duty at Naval Station Argentia, Newfoundland. After 10 days at Casco Bay, she returned to Argentia and remained there until late January 1942, when she got underway to escort a convoy to England. After delivering her charges, the battleship patrolled waters near Iceland until March when she returned home. At various times in 1942, the secondary battery was reduced to six 5-inch guns and the light AA battery was increased, adding two extra 1.1-inch/75-caliber quad mounts (these would be replaced by 10 quad mount 40 mm (1.6 in) Bofors in June 1943) and adding fourteen 20 mm (0.79 in) Oerlikon cannons (increased to 44 by 1944), the attack on Pearl Harbor having demonstrated the need for this. For the next six months, she continued convoy-escort missions to various destinations. On one occasion, she escorted Guadalcanal-bound Marines as far as Panama; on another, the warship screened service troops to Freetown, Sierra Leone, on the west coast of Africa. More frequently, she made voyages to and from the United Kingdom escorting both cargo- and troop-carrying ships.

==== Operation Torch ====
On 23 October 1942, Texas embarked upon her first major combat operation when she sortied with Task Group 34.8 (TG 34.8), the Northern Attack Group for Operation Torch, the invasion of North Africa. The objective assigned to this group was Port Lyautey in French Morocco. The warships arrived off the assault beaches near the village of Mehedia early in the morning of 8 November and began preparations for the invasion. Texas transmitted Lt. General Dwight D. Eisenhower's first "Voice of Freedom" broadcast, asking the French not to oppose Allied landings on North Africa. When the troops went ashore, Texas did not go into action immediately to support them. At that point in the war, the doctrine of amphibious warfare was still embryonic. Many Army officers did not recognize the value of prelanding bombardments. Instead, the Army insisted upon attempting a landing by surprise. Texas entered the battle early in the afternoon when the Army requested her to fire upon a Vichy French Army ammunition dump near Port Lyautey. One more gunfire mission was provided on the 10th before the cease fire on 11 November. Thus, unlike in later operations, she expended only 273 rounds of 14-inch shells and six rounds of 5-inch shells. During her short stay, some of her crewmen went ashore to assist in salvaging some of the ships that had been sunk in the harbor. Texas was one of only three U.S. battleships (Massachusetts and New York) that took part in Operation Torch. On 16 November, Texas departed North Africa for the East Coast of the United States in a task force along with Savannah, Sangamon, Kennebec, four transports, and seven destroyers.

The young news reporter Walter Cronkite was on board Texas starting in Norfolk, Virginia, through her service off the coast of North Africa, and thence back to the US. On the return trip, Cronkite was flown off Texas in one of her OS2U Kingfisher aircraft when Norfolk was within flying distance. He was granted permission to be flown the rest of the distance to Norfolk so that he could outpace a rival correspondent on Massachusetts to return to the U.S. and to issue the first uncensored news reports to be published about Operation Torch. Cronkite's experiences aboard Texas launched his career as a war correspondent.

==== Operation Overlord ====
Throughout 1943, Texas carried out the familiar role of convoy escort. With New York as her home port, she made numerous transatlantic voyages to such places as Casablanca and Gibraltar, as well as frequent visits to ports in the UK. That routine continued into 1944 but ended on 22 April of that year when, at the European end of one such mission, she remained at the Clyde estuary in Scotland and began training for the invasion of Normandy.

===== Rehearsal =====
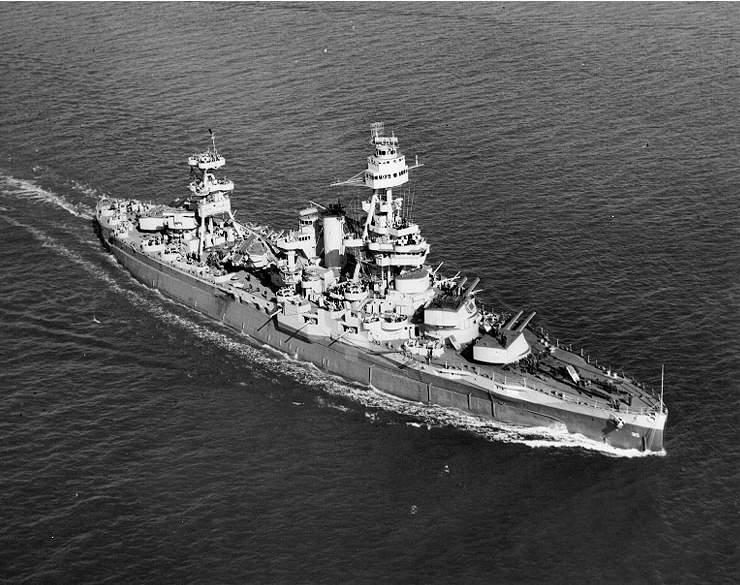
Texas off Norfolk, Virginia, 15 March 1943

During the next twelve days, Texas carried out many 14-inch gun-firing exercises with British battleships HMS Ramillies and Rodney. The firing was done in conjunction with Royal Air Force airplanes as spotters. On 29 April, Texas, Nevada, and Arkansas relocated to Belfast Lough, Northern Ireland. There, final preparations were made, including the removal of the airplane catapult and the ship's OS2U Kingfisher observation planes. The three pilots who flew Texas's Kingfishers during this period were temporarily transferred to a newly formed squadron, VOS-7, that was composed of the pilots who flew observation and scouting planes from the cruisers Augusta, Quincy, and Tuscaloosa and the battleships Arkansas, Nevada, and Texas. VOS-7 received training in defensive fighter tactics, aerobatics, navigation, formation flying and spotting procedures in Royal Air Force Spitfires; they flew spotting missions in the Spitfires because of the threat from German fighters. The pilots of VOS-7 would fly spotting missions for the U.S. warships off Omaha and Utah Beaches during D-Day. Also, during this time additional radio equipment was added, including a device to detect and jam radio-guided missiles. (Note: Anti-ship missiles such as the Fritz X were among the first instances of short-range guided missiles during the Second World War. The Luftwaffe used them to some effect against Allied shipping, and sank or damaged some large warships successfully before the Allies devised countermeasures, principally radio jamming.) Final exercises were carried out to the south in Dundrum Bay and Belfast Lough. During the final preparations, General Eisenhower came aboard on 19 May to speak to the crew. On 31 May, the ship was sealed and a briefing given to the crew about the upcoming invasion. For the invasion, Texas was designated Bombardment Force Flagship for Omaha Beach, in the Western Taskforce. Her firing area of Omaha was the western half, supporting the U.S. 29th Infantry Division and the U.S. 2nd Ranger Battalion at Pointe du Hoc, and the U.S. 5th Ranger Battalion, which had been diverted to Western Omaha to support the troops at Pointe du Hoc.

The Omaha Beach bombardment force consisted of two sections with Texas and the British light cruiser HMS Glasgow responsible for the western half with Arkansas, and the French light cruisers Georges Leygues and Montcalm responsible for the east. Also assigned to Omaha Beach were the American destroyers Frankford, McCook, Carmick, Doyle, Emmons, Baldwin, Harding, Satterlee, Thompson, and the British destroyers HMS Tanatside, Talybont and Melbreak. Texas was one of only three U.S. battleships (Arkansas and Nevada) that took part in Operation Neptune (D-Day).

At 02:09 on 3 June, Texas and the rest of the Western Taskforce sailed from Belfast Lough for Normandy. In sight, on a parallel course was a group of British ships, including the battleships Warspite and Ramillies. At 07:10 on 4 June, the taskforce had to reverse course due to unacceptable weather in Normandy. Later that evening, off Lundy Island, the taskforce reversed course and headed for and joined the invasion fleet gathering at Area Z. The invasion fleet then headed south toward Normandy and navigated the German minefield, through which minesweepers had cleared channels; not a single Omaha Beach vessel was lost.

===== D-Day =====
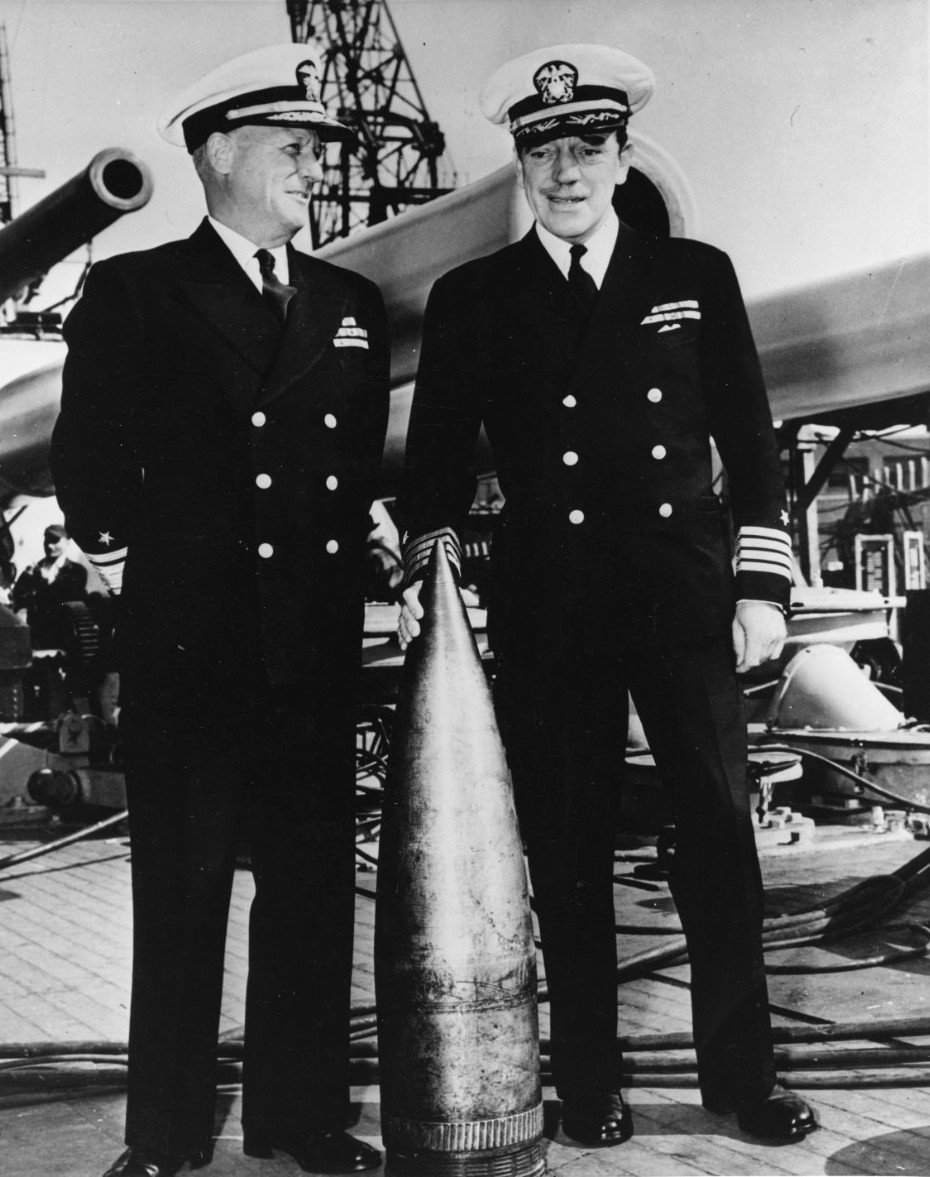
Rear admiral Carleton F. Bryant (left) and Captain Charles A. Baker, Commanding Officer of USS Texas aboard with a German 240mm (9.4) dud shell that hit the ship during the bombardment of Battery Hamburg, east of Cherbourg, France, on 25 June 1944.

At 03:00 on 6 June 1944, Texas and the British cruiser Glasgow entered the Omaha Western fire support lane and arrived at her initial firing position 12,000 yards (11,000 m) offshore near Pointe du Hoc at 04:41, as part of a combined total US-British flotilla of 702 ships, including seven battleships and five heavy cruisers. (Note: As for the other battleships, Arkansas took the eastern side of Omaha, Nevada took Utah, Ramillies took Sword, Warspite also took Sword but later moved to Gold, and Rodney took Juno. The final battleship was Nelson; however, she did not partake in initial bombardment, as she was held back until the 10th for follow-up escort and Channel patrols in addition to being a reserve. See: List of Allied warships in the Normandy Landings.) The initial bombardment commenced at 05:50, against the site of six 15-centimetre (6 in) guns, atop Pointe du Hoc. When Texas ceased firing at the Pointe at 06:24, 255 14-inch shells had been fired in 34 minutes—an average rate of fire of 7.5 shells per minute, which was the longest sustained period of firing for Texas in World War II. While shells from the main guns were hitting Pointe du Hoc, the 5-inch guns were firing on the area leading up to Exit D-1, the route to get inland from western Omaha. At 06:26, Texas shifted her main battery gunfire to the western edge of Omaha Beach, around the town of Vierville. Meanwhile, her secondary battery went to work on another target on the western end of "Omaha" beach, a ravine laced with strong points to defend an exit road. Later, under control of airborne spotters, she moved her major-caliber fire inland to interdict enemy reinforcement activities and to destroy batteries and other strong points farther inland.

By 0900, the assault on Omaha Beach was in danger of collapsing due to stronger than anticipated German resistance and the inability of the Allies to get needed armor and artillery units on the beach. In an effort to help the infantry fighting to take Omaha, some of the destroyers providing gunfire support closed near the shoreline, almost grounding themselves to fire on the Germans. Texas also closed to the shoreline; at 12:23, Texas closed to only 3,000 yd (2,700 m) from the water's edge, firing her main guns with very little elevation to clear the western exit D-1, in front of Vierville. Among other things, she fired upon snipers and machine gun nests hidden in a defile just off the beach. At the conclusion of that mission, the battleship attacked an enemy anti-aircraft battery located west of Vierville.

On 7 June, the battleship received word that the Ranger battalion at Pointe Du Hoc was still isolated from the rest of the invasion force with low ammunition and mounting casualties; in response, Texas obtained and filled two LCVPs with provisions and ammunition for the Rangers. Upon their return, the LCVPs brought thirty-five wounded Rangers to Texas for treatment of whom one died on the operating table. Along with the Rangers, a deceased Coast Guardsman and twenty-seven prisoners (twenty Germans, four Italians, and three French) were brought to the ship. The prisoners were fed, segregated, and not formally interrogated aboard Texas, due to the ship bombarding targets or standing by to bombard, before being loaded aboard an LST for transfer to England. Later in the day, her main battery rained shells on the enemy-held towns of Formigny and Trévières to break up German troop concentrations. That evening, she bombarded a German mortar battery that had been shelling the beach. Not long after midnight, German planes attacked the ships offshore, and one of them swooped in low on Texas's starboard quarter. Her anti-aircraft batteries opened up immediately but failed to hit the intruder. On the morning of 8 June, her guns fired on Isigny, then on a shore battery, and finally on Trévières once more.

After that, she retired to Plymouth to rearm, returning to the French coast on 11 June. From then until 15 June, she supported the army in its advance inland. By 15 June, the troops had advanced to the edge of Texas's gun range; her last fire support mission was so far inland that to get the needed range, the starboard torpedo blister was flooded with water to provide a list of two degrees which gave the guns enough elevation to complete the fire mission. With combat operations beyond the range of her guns on 16 June, Texas left Normandy for England on 18 June.

==== Battle of Cherbourg ====
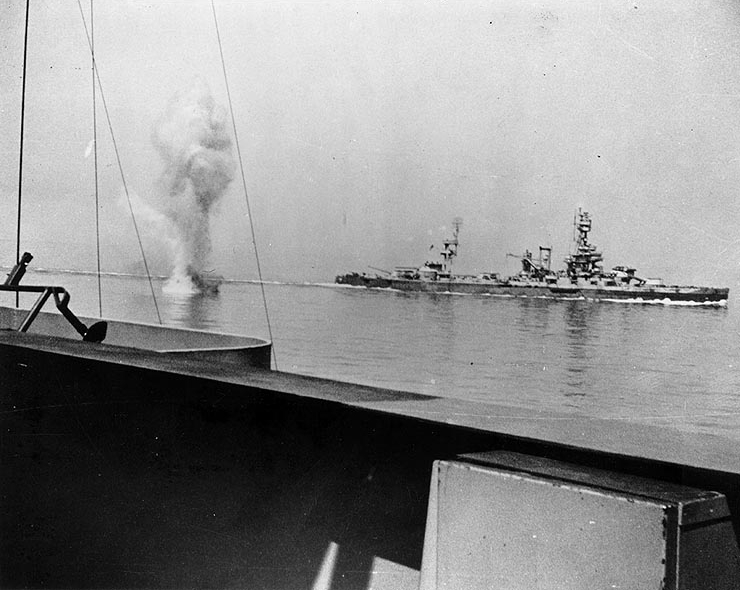
A heavy German coast artillery shell falls between Texas (in the background) and Arkansas while the two battleships were engaging Battery Hamburg during the battle of Cherbourg, France, 25 June 1944

On the morning of 25 June, Texas, in company with Arkansas, Nevada, four cruisers and eleven destroyers, closed in on the vital port of Cherbourg to suppress the fortifications and batteries surrounding the town while the U.S. Army's VII Corps attacked the city from the rear. While en route to Cherbourg, the bombardment plan was changed and Task Group 129.2 (TG 129.2), built around Arkansas and Texas, was ordered to move 6 mi (9.7 km) to the east of Cherbourg and engage the guns of Battery Hamburg, a large shore battery composed of four 24 cm (9 in) guns. At 12:08, Arkansas was the first to fire at the German positions, while the German gunners waited for Arkansas and Texas to be well in range to return fire. At 12:33, Texas was straddled by three German shells; five minutes later Texas returned fire with a continuous stream of two-gun salvos. The battleship continued her firing runs in spite of shell geysers blossoming about her and difficulty spotting the targets because of smoke; however, the enemy gunners were just as stubborn and skilled. At 13:16, a German 24-cm shell skidded across the top of her conning tower, sheared the top of the fire control periscope off (the periscope remains fell back into the conning tower and wounded the fire control officer, Lt. Cmdr. Richard B Derickson Jr. and three others), hit the main support column of the navigation bridge and exploded. The explosion caused the deck of the pilot house above to be blown upwards approximately 4 ft (1.2 m), wrecked the interior of the pilot house, and wounded seven. Of the eleven total casualties from the German shell hit, only one man succumbed to his wounds—the helmsman on duty, Christen Christensen. Texas's commanding officer, Captain Baker, escaped unhurt and quickly had the bridge cleared. The warship herself continued to deliver her 14-inch shells in two-gun salvos and, in spite of damage and casualties, scored a direct hit that penetrated one of the heavily reinforced gun emplacements to destroy the gun inside at 13:35.

At 14:47, an unexploded 24 cm shell was reported. The shell crashed through the port bow directly below the Wardroom and entered the stateroom of Warrant Officer M.A. Clark, but failed to explode. The unexploded shell was later disarmed by a Navy bomb disposal officer in Portsmouth and is currently displayed aboard the ship. Throughout the three-hour duel, the Germans straddled and near-missed Texas over sixty-five times, but she continued her mission firing 206 fourteen-inch shells at Battery Hamburg until ordered to retire at 15:01.

==== Operation Dragoon ====
After Texas underwent repairs at Plymouth from damage sustained at Cherbourg, she drilled in preparation for the invasion of southern France. On 16 July, she departed Belfast Lough and headed for the Mediterranean. After stops at Gibraltar and Oran, Algeria, the battleship arrived in Taranto, Italy on 27 July. Departing Taranto on 11 August, Texas rendezvoused with three French destroyers off Bizerte, Tunisia, and set a course for the French Riviera. She arrived off Saint-Tropez during the night of 14 August and was joined early the next morning by battleship Nevada and cruiser Philadelphia At 04:44 on 15 August, she moved into position for the pre-landing bombardment and, at 0651, opened up on her first target, a battery of five 15 cm guns. The beaches had been fortified and heavy resistance was expected. Due to very poor visibility that morning, Texas relied on her SG radar equipment to determine her position and track for both navigation and gunnery purposes. No landmarks were visible during the firing and for the greater part of the forenoon.

The heavy opposition that was expected never materialized, so the landing forces moved inland rapidly. As fire support from Texas's guns was no longer required, she departed the southern coast of France on the early morning of 17 August. After a stop at Palermo, Sicily, she left the Mediterranean and headed for New York where she arrived on 14 September 1944.

==== Operations Detachment and Iceberg ====
At New York, Texas underwent a 36-day repair period during which the barrels on her main battery were replaced. She replaced all ten of her 14-inch main gun barrels for the third and final time in her career during this refit. In an incredible stroke of luck she was reunited with 9 out of 10 of her original gun barrels that served on Texas from 1914 to 1923. These nine guns served with Pennsylvania prior to being refurbished, relined, and reinstalled on Texas in late 1944. These original guns have remained on Texas ever since. After a brief refresher cruise, she departed Maine in November and set a course, via the Panama Canal, for the Pacific. She made a stop at Long Beach, California, and then continued on to Oahu. She spent Christmas at Pearl Harbor and then conducted maneuvers in the Hawaiian Islands for about a month at the end of which she steamed to Ulithi Atoll. She departed Ulithi on 10 February 1945, stopped in the Mariana Islands for two days of invasion rehearsals, and then she set a course for Iwo Jima. She arrived off Iwo Jima on 16 February, three days before the amphibious landings began. She spent just three days pounding the Japanese defenses on Iwo Jima in preparation for the landing of three Marine Corps Divisions. After the Marines stormed the beaches on 19 February, Texas switched to providing naval gunfire support for them. "On-call fire" in response to requests from Marine units continued through 21 February.

Though the island of Iwo Jima was not declared to be captured until 16 March, Texas departed from the Volcano Islands on 7 March, and returned to Ulithi Atoll to prepare for the invasion of Okinawa (Operation Iceberg). She departed from Ulithi with Task Force 54, the gunfire support unit, on 21 March, and arrived in the Ryukyu Islands on the 26th. Texas moved in close to Okinawa and began her prelanding bombardment that same day. For the next six days, she fired multiple salvos from her main guns to prepare the way for several Army and Marine divisions to make their amphibious landings on 1 April.

Each evening, Texas retired from her bombardment position close to Okinawa, but returned the next morning to resume her bombardments. The enemy ashore, preparing for a defense-in-depth strategy as at Iwo Jima, made no answer. Only air units provided a response, as several kamikaze raids were sent to harass the bombardment group. Texas escaped damage during those attacks. On 1 April, after six days of aerial and naval bombardment, the ground troops went ashore, and for almost two months, Texas remained in Okinawan waters providing gunfire support for the troops and fending off the enemy aerial assault. In performing the latter mission, she claimed one kamikaze kill on her own and claimed three assists. Texas was at general quarters for over 50 days straight at Okinawa due to the threat of kamikazes. This meant that the crew were at their battle stations at all times for seven weeks and ate only crackers and K-rations for meals and their only resting time was a quick shower and change of clothes every 3 days. Texas was never damaged as a result and it is believed that this was the only U.S. ship that stayed at general quarters for such duration at any point during World War II. She fired 2,019 fourteen-inch shells, 2,643 5-inch shells, 490 3-inch shells, 3,100 rounds of 40 mm ammunition, and 2,205 rounds of 20 mm ammunition during the Okinawa campaign. On 14 May she departed Okinawa for the Philippines.

==== End of the war ====
On 17 May, Texas arrived at Leyte in the Philippines and remained there until after the Japanese capitulation on 15 August. She returned to Okinawa toward the end of August and stayed in the Ryukyu Islands until 23 September. On that day, she set a course for the United States with homeward bound troops embarked as part of Operation Magic Carpet. The battleship delivered her passengers to San Pedro, California on 15 October, and celebrated Navy Day there on 27 October before resuming her mission to bring American troops home. She made two round-trip voyages between California and Oahu in November and a third in late December. On 21 January 1946, Texas departed San Pedro and steamed via the Panama Canal to Norfolk where she arrived on 13 February, and soon began preparations for inactivation. On 18 June, she was placed officially in reserve at Baltimore, Maryland.

== Museum ship ==
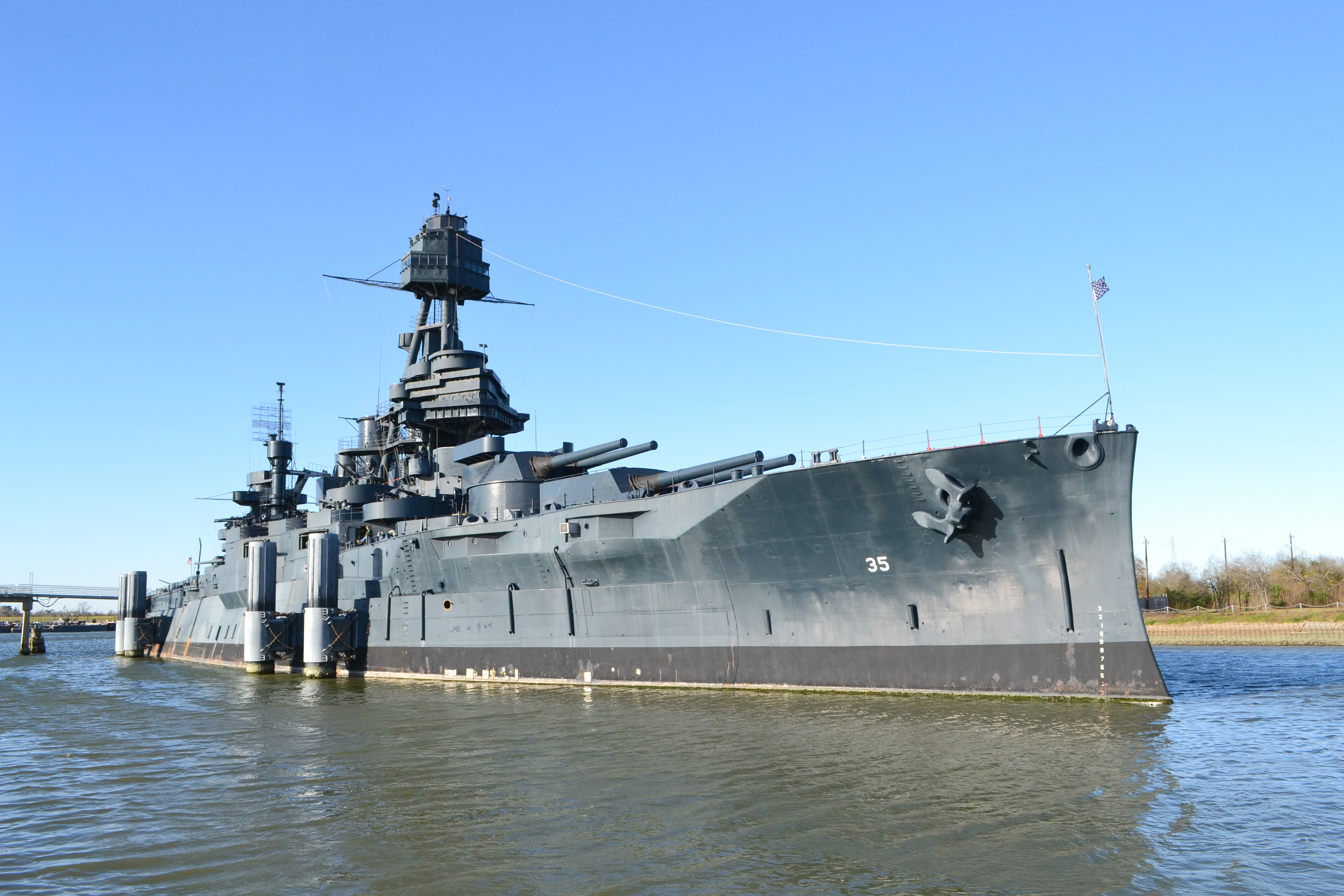
Battleship Texas in 2012

=== Battleship Texas Commission ===
On 17 April 1947, the Battleship Texas Commission was established by the Texas Legislature to care for the ship. The $225,000 necessary to pay for towing her from Baltimore to San Jacinto was the commission's first task. On 17 March 1948, Texas began her journey to her new anchorage along the busy Houston Ship Channel near the San Jacinto Monument, at San Jacinto State Park, arriving on 20 April, where she was turned over to the State of Texas the next day to serve as a permanent memorial. Texas sat just across from the monument at Battleground Park in the waters of the Port of Houston where she was ceremoniously decommissioned on the 21st, nine days later on 30 April 1948 her name was struck from the Naval Vessel Register. Texas was the first permanent battleship memorial museum in the US. USS Oregon (BB-3) was displayed as a floating museum in Portland, Oregon from 1925 to 1941 but was scrapped in 1956. When the battleship was presented to the State of Texas, she was commissioned as the flagship of the ceremonial Texas Navy.

The funding produced by the Battleship Texas Commission was not up to the task of maintaining the ship. Consequently, years of neglect resulted in cracks and gaps in coated surfaces, water intrusion, and steel deterioration. Paint in interior spaces began to crack, then flake, exposing metal surfaces underneath, which began to rust. At the same time, pipes open to the sea ultimately failed, flooding various voids and bunkers. By 1968, the wooden main deck of the ship was so rotted that rainwater was leaking through the deck into the interior of the ship and pooling in various compartments. The Commission found that replacing the decayed deck timbers would be prohibitively expensive. The solution at the time was to remove the wooden deck and replace it with concrete. The concrete eventually cracked, and again, rainwater began to leak through the main deck into spaces below. In 1971, three local charitable institutions, the Brown Foundation, the Moody Foundation, and the Houston Endowment, together contributed $50,000 to the ship to enable the commission to sandblast and paint the hull. By this time, newspaper articles reported that Texas was "under attack" from neglect and insufficient funding. Nevertheless, Texas was designated a National Historic Mechanical Engineering Landmark by the American Society of Mechanical Engineers in 1975, and a National Historic Landmark by the National Park Service in 1976.

=== Transfer to Texas Parks and Wildlife Department ===
By 1983, concerns with the leadership of the Battleship Texas Commission led to the decision by the State Legislature to turn over control of the ship to the Texas Parks and Wildlife Department (TPWD). The legislature abolished the commission effective 31 August 1983, and TPWD assumed operational control the next day. One of the first actions by TPWD was to hire a firm of naval architects to survey the ship in order to assess the deterioration and make recommendations as to what actions should be taken to preserve the ship. The survey revealed that the ship's watertight integrity was badly compromised, the hull was open to the sea in many places, and many compartments were full of standing rain water. The architects determined that the ship needed to go to dry dock for major repairs to the hull and to keep rain water from coming through the porous concrete deck. As part of this plan, serious consideration was given to protecting sensitive fabrics and restoring the interior of the ship. After a five-year-long fund-raising campaign, $15 million was collected to dry dock the ship and complete necessary repairs.

=== 1988–1990 dry dock period ===
On 13 December 1988, Texas was pulled from her berth with great difficulty over the course of six hours by six large tugboats to begin the 56-mile (49 nmi; 90 km) trip from her berth to Todd Shipyards in Galveston, Texas. Once under tow in the Houston Ship Channel she started taking on water, with a serious breach just forward of the engine rooms. The crew had three 4-inch (100 mm) pumps and two 2-inch (51 mm) pumps in continuous service to combat the flooding. During the nine-plus hour transit, the ship's draft increased by 18 to 20 in (460 to 510 mm) in the stern.

Texas entered the yard's floating drydock at approximately 22:30 on 13 December, at high tide with only 6 in (150 mm) to spare between her hull and the blocks she would sit on. She underwent a 14-month refit that sought to restore the ship to her 1945 condition. While under refit, yard workers sand-blasted paint from not only the hull but also the superstructure and replaced many tons of rusted metal from the hull. Inside the ship, welders and fabricators replaced weakened structural beams and numerous rusted-out deck plates. Topside, workers removed the concrete from the main deck in preparation for a new pinewood deck to be installed later in the refit. In total, more than 375,000 lb (170,000 kg) of steel (amounting to about 15% of the ship's hull) were replaced and more than 40,000 rivets were seal-welded on the underwater hull.

On 24 February 1990, tugboats moved Texas from dry dock to Brown & Root's offshore fabrication facility on Green's Bayou for further repairs, and installation of the four mooring attachments on the starboard side of the vessel. Special diamond bit cutting blades had to be used to cut the 4" thick hull steel which was made in Germany and hardened in carbonized beds to reach over 425 HB hardness values according to original blueprints. It was here that the wood deck was also installed and four of the ten mounts of quad 40 mm guns that had been removed in 1948 due to the guns still being actively used by the Navy were installed.

On 26 July, the ship was returned to her berth at San Jacinto where the four old inferior 1.1-inch/75-caliber guns that the Navy had given to Texas in 1948 as proxies for the quad 40s were removed and the final six 40 mm quad mounts (salvaged from Missouri, made available during her 1986 modernization) were installed.

Texas then had the haze gray paint scheme that she had worn most of her time in the Atlantic theater (but for the Measure 22 scheme she had worn at Normandy) and then from 1948 to 1990 before her first dry dock refit, replaced with the Measure 21 dark blue paint scheme she had worn in the Pacific theater at the end of World War II in 1945.

This made her appearance consistent with her new period correct anti-aircraft armament.

Repairs complete, the ship officially reopened to the public on 8 September 1990. Upon returning to her slip at San Jacinto, members of the ship's staff and volunteers worked to restore the interior spaces.

=== Dry berth project ===
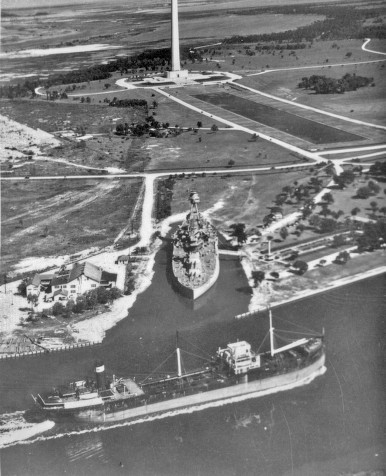
Battleship Texas

In 2004, after many years of working with many of the stakeholders at the San Jacinto Battleground State Historic Site evaluating a wide range of alternative plans to address the ship's problems, TPWD adopted a Master Plan that called for placing Texas into a permanent dry berth. The Texas Legislature was approached to secure appropriate funding. The Legislature allowed the voters of Texas to express their opinion and on 6 November 2007 Texas voters approved $25 million in funds to dry-berth the ship to prevent further deterioration from the corrosive waters of the ship channel.

One of the provisions of the bond legislation was the Battleship Texas Foundation (BTF), a non-profit support organization, raise $4 million in private funds to supplement the $25 million in bond funds. This would provide a total of $29 million to accomplish the goal.

BTF contracted a maritime engineering firm which determined that the ship's keel and main supporting internal structure would be sufficiently strong to support the ship in a dry berth, while another maritime engineering firm was also contracted to study the full range of dry berth alternatives. With these and other studies complete, TPWD presented a progress report to the Legislative Budget Board (LBB) in late July 2008.

In March 2009, the LBB released the funds for the dry berthing project to commence. After a lengthy selection process and fee negotiations, TPWD signed a contract with AECOM, on 26 October 2010, to design and develop the plans for Texas's dry-berth. The contract called for AECOM to have its preliminary design completed by spring 2011, with the bidding process for the construction of the dry berth and temporary mooring of Texas to begin in mid-2014, and construction completed by summer 2017. However, by February 2019, funds had not yet been secured to commence construction, with efforts instead dedicated to repairs to the ship.

On 28 May 2019, it was reported that Texas would be undergoing $35 million worth of repairs and then be moved further up the Texas coast, largely due to a decline in visitors at its current location. Later that year, Texas was closed to the public so necessary preparations could be made for the upcoming restoration process.

=== Leaks ===
In June 2010, a leak on the starboard side of the ship caused Texas to sink two to three feet in her mooring. The leak was precipitated by a burned out pump, which allowed the ship to take on more water than usual. Consequently, a seam separation was pulled below the waterline creating a second leak. Once the leak was discovered, the broken pump was replaced. 105,000 U.S. gal (400,000 L; 87,000 imp gal) of water had to be pumped from the ship.

On 9 June 2012 about 30 new leaks, between 1 in (25 mm) holes and 2 sq ft (0.19 m^{2}) gaps, were discovered, ultimately necessitating a three-week closure of the ship to visitors; removal of water and repair was complicated by the presence of residual oil in the ship's fuel bunkers. In less than a month, the leaks were fixed.

On 12 June 2017, a 6-by-8-inch (15 by 20 cm) hole about 15 feet (4.6 m) below the waterline caused the ship to list six degrees to starboard. After emergency repairs, crews pumped out about 105,000 U.S. gal (400,000 L; 87,000 imp gal) of water per minute out of the ship for more than 15 hours.

=== 2022–2025 dry dock period ===
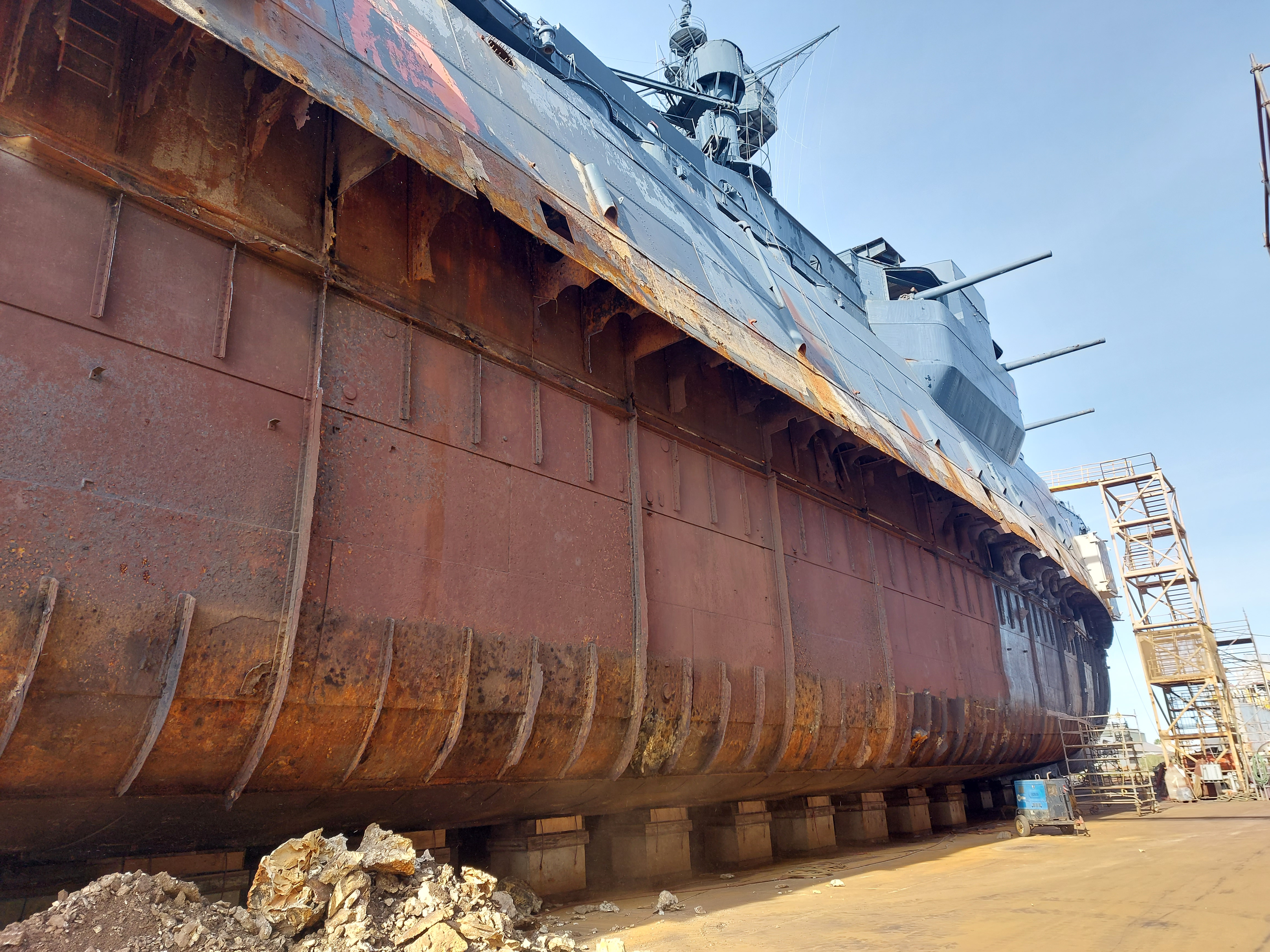
Starboard side of Texas with her torpedo blisters removed uncovering her original hull, December 2022

On 31 August 2022, Texas was towed out of her berth to a floating dry dock at Gulf Copper Dry Dock & Rig Repair in Galveston for repairs. The journey took four tugboats pulling the ship 40 miles (64 kilometres) through the Houston Ship Channel and ended at around 4 pm. Gulf Copper's old dry dock was no longer usable, so in order to find a quick affordable option for their client Texas, they found a sunken dry dock. The sunken dry dock was a very large 42-year-old dry dock that sank off of the Bahamas. The dry dock had to be salvaged by repairing it after raising it from the seafloor and then cutting its length in half due to heavy damage from its sinking. The first vessel to use this recycled dry dock was Texas.

Once repairs are complete, the Battleship Texas Foundation intends to berth the ship in Galveston. As part of the conditions for receiving the $35 million from the Texas government, Texas can only be berthed in the upper coast region of Texas after she is repaired, meaning any part of the Texas coastline from the San Bernard National Wildlife Refuge to the Louisiana border. Texas also received a matching $35 million federal grant from the United States government for her repairs. This $70 million can only be used to repair the battleship and cannot be used on cosmetic-related maintenance like replacing the wooden deck and painting the ship. Also, infrastructure-related projects for the new homeport such as the parking lot or museum buildings cannot be paid for by these funds. Texas later received $25 million more in funding for repairs from the Texas government in 2023.

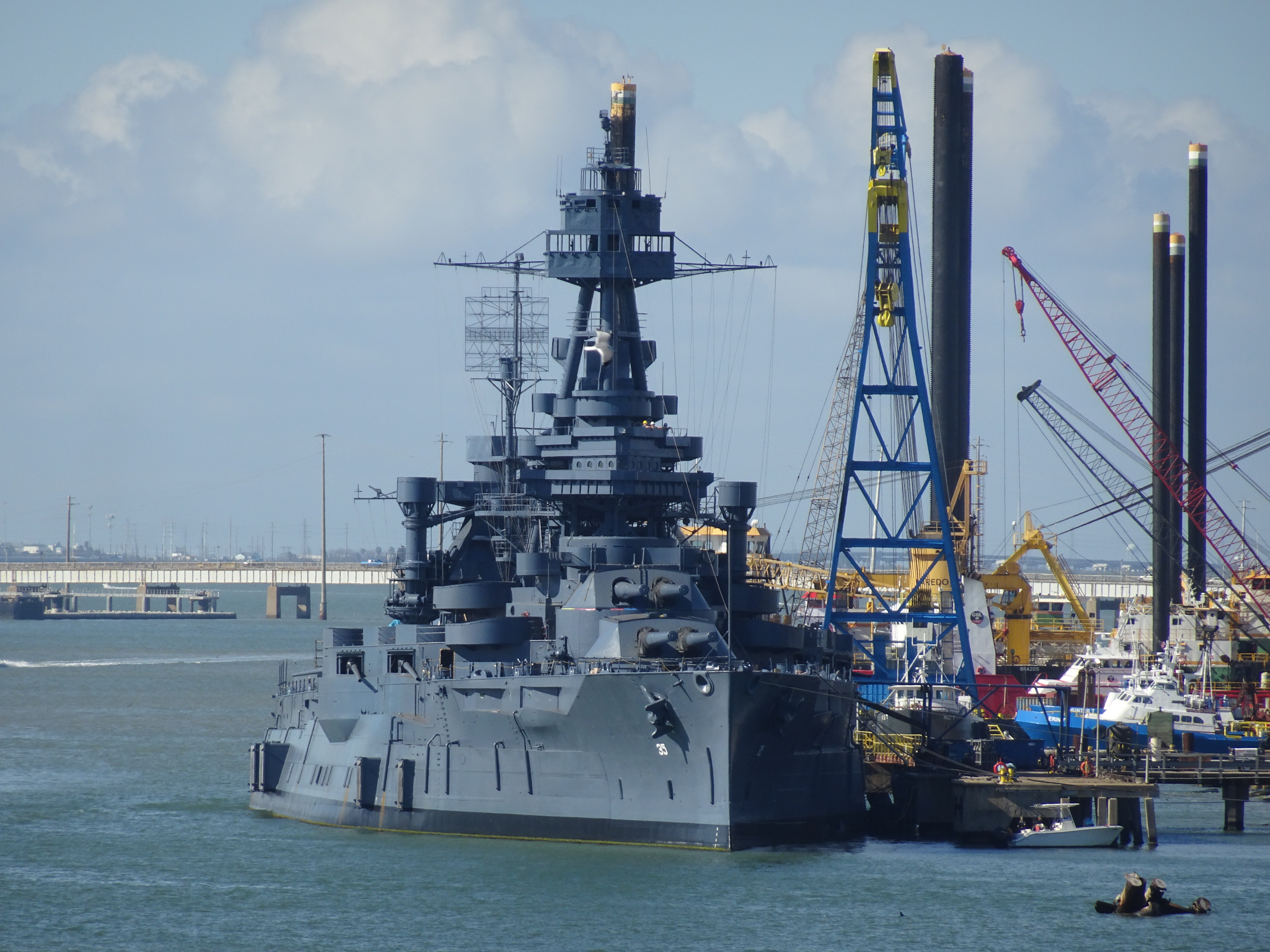
Texas afloat in Galveston, December 2025

In November 2023, the Port of Galveston board of trustees approved Galveston to become the new home for Texas. She left dry dock on 5 March 2024 but will receive more repairs while afloat for the next 18 to 24 months to her superstructure, smaller guns, and interior spaces.

On 4 March 2025, the Galveston Wharves Board voted unanimously to offer Pier 15 as a permanent docking berth for Texas to reside at.

As of June 2025, Texas is still under repair but offering restoration tours every Sunday. The Battleship Texas Foundation expects a grand reopening sometime in 2027.

On the ship's 114th launch anniversary, 18 May 2026, the battleship fired blank charges from her forward-most 14-inch main gun turret. This marks the first time since 1991 that any battleship has fired its main battery guns.

=== Commemoration ===
Texas was the first and oldest of the eight U.S. battleships that became permanent floating museums; the other battleships honored in this way are Massachusetts, Alabama, North Carolina, New Jersey, Missouri, Wisconsin, and Iowa. (Note: Iowa opened to the public 7 July 2012 in Los Angeles, California.) Texas is also one of the oldest surviving modern naval ships, having turned 110 years old on 12 March 2024.

Radio commemorations occur on Texas yearly during Museum Ship Weekend and Pearl Harbor Day. Amateur radio operators from the Battleship Texas Amateur Radio operate on those two occasions under the Federal Communications Commission callsign NA5DV, similar to the original callsign NADV.

The Texas Legislature designated the battleship Texas as the official "State Ship of Texas" in 1995.

== Media ==
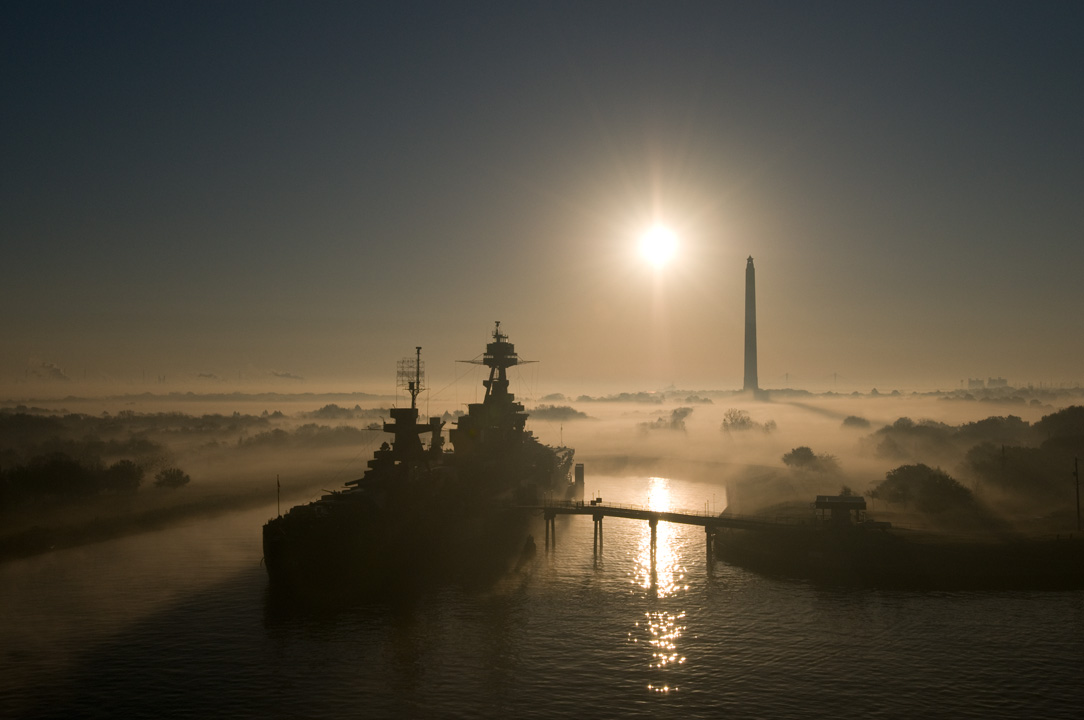
Texas seen at sunrise at the end of 2007; the obelisk in the background is the San Jacinto Monument

Texas has appeared in several films prior to and since her retirement. Her cinema debut, though brief, was in the final scene of the 1937 film Boy of the Streets starring Jackie Cooper and Maureen O'Conner. The 1966 Steve McQueen film The Sand Pebbles shot some scenes aboard the ship, but these were removed from the final cut of the movie and subsequently lost. For the 2001 film Pearl Harbor, Texas was chosen as a filming location because she is the only surviving American battleship that was built and in service prior to 1941, and her exterior and interior components look very similar to other battleships that were built in the 1910s and 1920s and were present on Battleship Row during the attack. Numerous exterior and interior shots were filmed on Texas, with actors using the main deck and numerous interior areas. The interior scenes of the aircraft carrier Hornet were also shot inside Texas. For the 2006 films Flags of Our Fathers and Letters from Iwo Jima actual film footage of the exterior of Texas taken by the film crew were used to depict her fighting at Iwo Jima. Close-up shots of actors manning the smaller guns of Texas also were used. The only thing added in post-production was computer-generated imagery depicting the main turrets turning and firing.

Texas appears as a multiplayer map for Call of Duty: Vanguard and Call of Duty: WWII. Players fight on the deck of the ship as it is at sea during World War II. Despite the name, however, the layout of the ship does not match the design of the real USS Texas (BB-35).

== See also ==
- U.S. Navy museums (and other battleship museums)
- Japanese battleship Mikasa, the only surviving pre-dreadnought battleship

== Bibliography ==
- Breyer, Siegfried (1973). Battleships and Battle Cruisers, 1905–1970. Garden City, New York: Doubleday. ISBN 9780385072472. OCLC 702840.
- Cronkite, Walter (1996). A Reporter's Life. New York: Knopf. pp. 89–90. ISBN 978-0-394-57879-8. OCLC 34958652.
- Egan, Robert S.; Lott, Arnold S.; Sumrall, Robert F. (1976). USS Texas (BB35). Annapolis, Maryland: Leeward Publications. ISBN 0-915268-06-X. OCLC 2645562.
- Ferguson, John C. (2007). Historic Battleship Texas: The Last Dreadnought. Military History of Texas #4. Abilene, Texas: State House Press. ISBN 978-1-933337-07-4. OCLC 154678508.
- Friedman, Norman (1986). U.S. Battleships: An Illustrated Design History. Annapolis, Maryland: Naval Institute Press. ISBN 9780870217159. OCLC 12214729.
- Gardiner, Robert; Gray, Randal (1985). Conway's All the World's Fighting Ships 1906–1921. Annapolis: Naval Institute Press. p. 115. ISBN 9780851772455. OCLC 12119866.
- Harrison, Gordon (1951). United States Army in World War II: The European Theater of Operations, The Cross Channel Attack. Washington, D.C.: United States Army Center of Military History. p. 519. ISBN 9780160018817. OCLC 50729081.
- Hatch, Rosie, ed. (2022). Texas Almanac 2022-2023. Austin, Texas: Texas State Historical Association. ISBN 978-1-62511-066-4.
- Hone, Thomas C.; Hone, Trent (2006). Battleline: The United States Navy 1919–1939. Annapolis: Naval Institute Press. ISBN 9781591143789. OCLC 62324475.
- Jones, Jerry W. (1998). Battleship Texas. Annapolis: Naval Institute Press. ISBN 9781557504111. OCLC 37935228.
- Kaufmann, J. E. (2002). Fortress Europe: European Fortifications of World War II. Cambridge, Massachusetts: Da Capo Press. p. 432. ISBN 9780306811746. OCLC 52821490.
- Love, Robert W. (1992). History of the U.S. Navy: 1775–1941. Harrisburg, Pennsylvania: Stackpole Books. p. 537. ISBN 978-0-8117-1862-2. OCLC 659967537.
- McManus, John C. (2004). The Americans at Normandy: The Summer of 1944--the American War from the Normandy Beaches to Falaise. New York: Forge. p. 496. ISBN 9780765311993. OCLC 55510683.
- Morison, Samuel Eliot (2001). History of United States Naval Operations in World War II: The Invasion of France and Germany 1944–1945. Edison, New Jersey: Castle Books. p. 496. ISBN 9780785813125. OCLC 52204536.
- Pater, Alan F. (1968). United States Battleships: The History of America's Greatest Fighting Fleet. Beverly Hills, California: Monitor Book Company. ISBN 9780917734076. OCLC 439949.
- Powers, Hugh (1993). Battleship Texas. College Station: Texas A&M University Press. ISBN 9780890965191. OCLC 49569222.
- Ryan, Cornelius (1959). The Longest Day: 6 June 1944. New York: Simon & Schuster. p. 90. ISBN 9780671890919. OCLC 30364485.
- Sterne, Gary (2014). The Cover-Up at Omaha Beach: D-Day, the US Rangers, and the Untold Story of Maisy Battery. Skyhorse Publishing. pp. 26–27. ISBN 9781629143279. OCLC 879371577.
- Westwood, J. N. (1975) [1971]. "The Battleship". Fighting ships of World War II. London: Sidgwick & Jackson. p. 23. ISBN 978-0-283-98287-3. OCLC 2090062.
- Wiper, Steve; Flowers, Tom (2006) [1999]. USS Texas BB-35. Warship Pictorial #4. Tucson, Arizona: Classic Warships Publishing. ISBN 9780965482936. OCLC 42533363.
