= Victor Blue =

United States Navy admiral

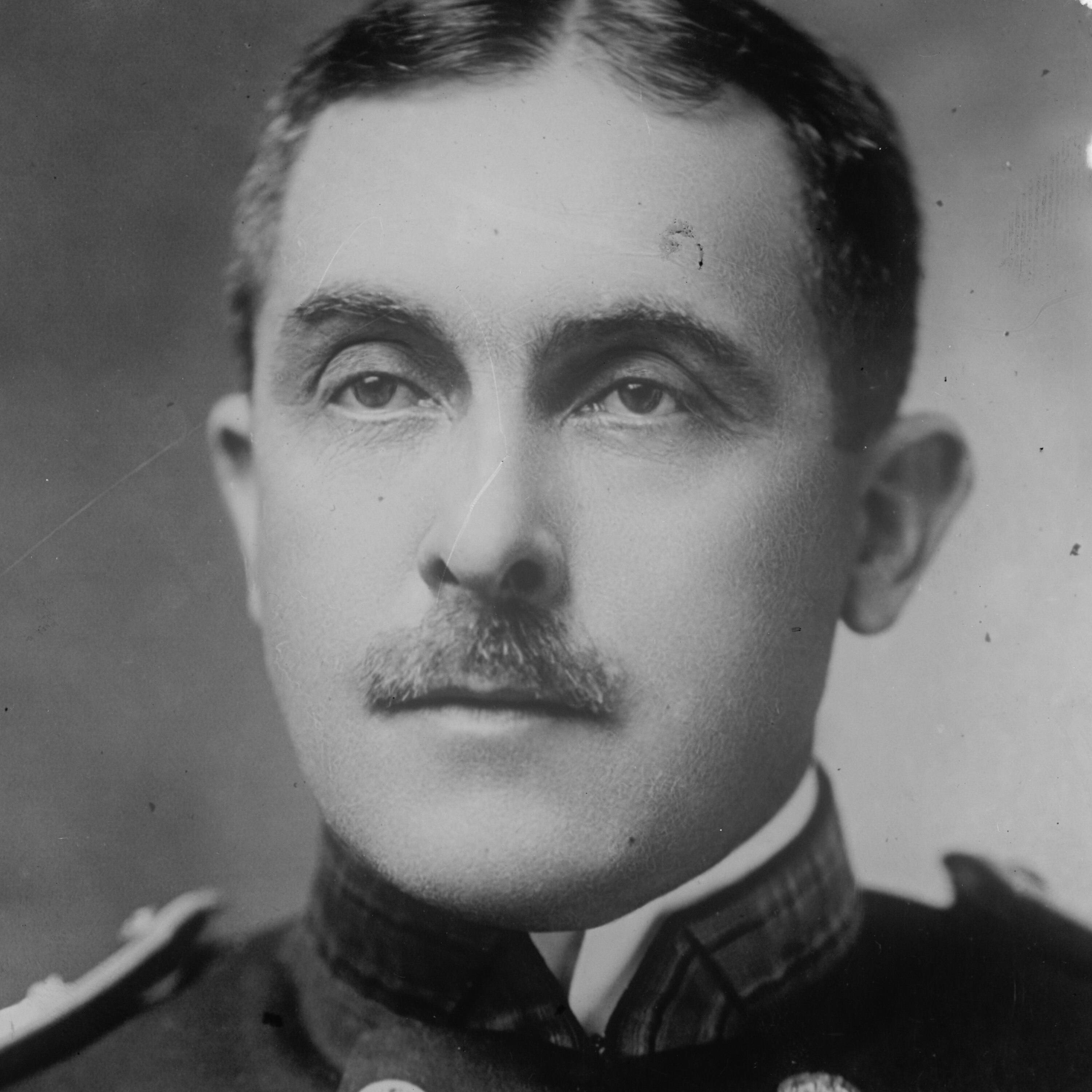
- Born: December 6, 1865; Richmond County, North Carolina
- Died: January 22, 1928 (aged 62)
- Military career
- Allegiance: United States of America
- Branch: United States Navy
- Service years: 1887–1919 (32 Years)
- Rank: Rear admiral (United States)
- Commands: USS Alvarado (1895); USS Texas
- Conflicts: Spanish–American War; World War I
- Awards: Navy Distinguished Service Medal; Specially Meritorious Service Medal

Victor Blue (December 6, 1865 – January 22, 1928) was a rear admiral of the United States Navy.

== Career ==
Lieutenant Blue was advanced five numbers for intelligence missions in Cuba during the Spanish–American War. He served on the Suwanee, and attracted general attention in June, 1898, by penetrating 72 miles (116 km) within the Spanish lines in the vicinity of Santiago, Cuba, and definitely determining for the first time the presence of the Spanish fleet in Santiago harbor. He commanded the Alvarado, a gunboat captured from the Spanish, in the attack upon Manzanillo, became Flag lieutenant in the Pacific Squadron, and served in the Philippines in 1900–01.

From the ranks of inspector of ordnance, held in 1905–07, he was promoted until he became commander in 1909 and in 1910 chief of staff in the Pacific Fleet. Soon thereafter he was transferred to duty on the General Board of the Navy Department. He served as Chief of the Bureau of Navigation (1913–16 and 1919). Under Admiral Beatty he commanded Texas (BB-35) in the North Sea during her service with the 6th Battle Squadron. He was made rear-admiral on April 1, 1919. Rear Admiral Blue was retired in June, 1919, because of disability received in line of duty. He died 22 January 1928.

== Namesake ==
In 1937, the destroyer USS Blue (DD-387) was named in his honor.

== Family ==
Blue's brother was Surgeon General Rupert Blue.

== United States awards ==
Navy Distinguished Service Medal

- Specially Meritorious Service Medal
- Sampson Medal
- Spanish Campaign Medal

World War I Victory Medal
