= 349th Infantry Regiment =

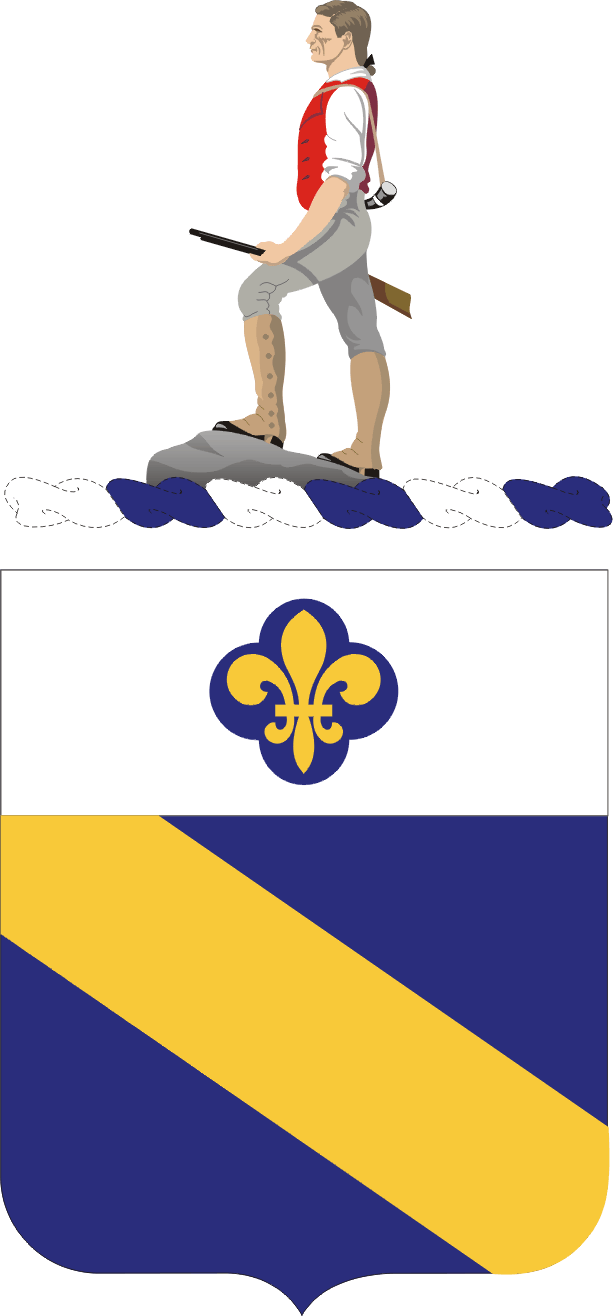
- Coat of Arms
- Active: 1917-1919; 1921-1947; 1948-1952; 1954-1998; 1999-present
- Country: United States
- Branch: United States Army; Army of the United States
- Type: Infantry
- Size: Regiment
- Nickname: Kraut Killers
- Mottos: Liberty and Rights
- Engagements: World War I World War II: Rome-Arno Campaign; North Apennines Campaign; Po Valley Campaign

Commanders
- Notable commanders: Joseph B. Crawford

The 349th Infantry Regiment was an infantry regiment of the United States Army's 88th Infantry Division, the "Blue Devils." The regiment served in World War I and saw brief action in Alsace, but served with great distinction in World War II in the Italian Campaign. Once the war was over, the regiment joined the Trieste United States Troops, or TRUST, and served in the Free Territory of Trieste as an occupation force until they were sent home and disbanded in 1952. Today, the legacy of the 349th Infantry Regiment is carried on by the 349th Regiment, a USAR light support training unit at Fort Stewart, Georgia.

== World War I ==
The 349th Infantry Regiment was constituted on 5 August 1917 in the Army of the United States and was assigned to the 88th Infantry Division and organized at Camp Dodge, Iowa. The regiment trained for combat in World War I and arrived in France in late 1918. The 349th saw minor combat in Alsace just before the war ended, and the 88th Division as a whole suffered only 78 total casualties. The 349th Infantry arrived at the port of New York on 30 May 1919 on the troopship SS Ryndam and was demobilized on 12 June 1919 at Camp Dodge.

== Interwar period ==
The 349th Infantry was reconstituted in the Organized Reserve on 24 June 1921, assigned to the 88th Division, and allotted to the Seventh Corps Area. The regiment was initiated on 12 October 1921 with the regimental headquarters established at Iowa City, Iowa. Subordinate battalion headquarters were concurrently organized as follows: 1st Battalion at Waterloo, Iowa; 2nd Battalion at Cedar Rapids, Iowa; and the 3rd Battalion at Ottumwa, Iowa. The regimental headquarters was relocated on 26 May 1926 to Davenport, Iowa, and again in 1928 to Cedar Rapids. The regiment typically conducted inactive training period meetings at the State University of Iowa ROTC Armory in Iowa City, the Hotel Russell-Lamson in Waterloo, the Federal Building in Cedar Rapids, and the Ballingall Hotel in Ottumwa. Conducted summer training some years with the 3rd Infantry Regiment at Fort Snelling, Minnesota, and also conducted infantry Citizens Military Training Camps many years at Fort Des Moines, Iowa, or Fort Snelling as an alternate form of summer training. In 1927, the regiment, along with the 350th Infantry, conducted the first CMTC camp run solely by a Reserve unit. For the 1937 Fourth Army maneuvers, the regiment provided a number of officers to the Iowa National Guard's 133rd Infantry at Camp Ripley, Minnesota. The primary ROTC "feeder" schools for new Reserve lieutenants for the regiment were Coe College and the State University of Iowa. The regiment was inactivated on 22 January 1942 by relief of remaining Reserve personnel.

== World War II ==
The 349th Infantry Regiment was called up for active duty service on 15 July 1942 at Camp Gruber, Oklahoma and was staffed by a skeleton crew of cadre, mostly from the 9th Infantry Division. These cadre prepared and trained until the draftees arrived to fill in the regiment's personnel. The regiment underwent intensive basic and advanced training at Camp Gruber, and went on to score well in the various maneuvers it was tested in. The 88th Division was ready to go to combat and it was the first "draftee division" to be sent overseas by the US Army. The 349th landed in Casablanca, French Morocco on 15 December 1943 and continued their intensive training regimen in Algeria. The 88th Infantry Division was slated for duty in the Italian Campaign and arrived in Naples on 4 February 1944. Wary of the performance of the all-draftee unit, US commanders did not send the 349th into the line until 27 February.

The 349th began its combat action in the Minturno sector, relieving elements of the British 5th Division, and soon began aggressive patrolling operations against the Wehrmacht. Manning the right flank, the 349th engaged in numerous combat, reconnaissance, and "prisoner-snatch" patrols that often resulted in sharp confrontations. 2LT John A. Liebenstein, K Company, of Monona, Iowa, earned the regiment's first Distinguished Service Cross by attacking an enemy Machine-gun nest with a jammed weapon. 2LT Liebenstein was wounded while taking a prisoner and bought his men time to escape as German mortar fire rained down. He was never seen again. The tough patrolling in Minturno wore the regiment out, so they were relieved by the 339th Infantry Regiment of the 85th Infantry Division on 17 March 1944. The 349th went into division reserve in Casanova, Italy. During this rest, a new regimental commander, COL Joseph B. Crawford of Humboldt, Kansas, took command of the 349th. COL Crawford was wounded three times, and had fought in the North African Campaign, Operation Husky, the Battle of Salerno, and the Battle of Anzio. He gave the 349th a new fighting spirit and a new nickname; the "Kraut Killers."

Beginning in April, the 349th moved back into the line and continued to engage in active patrolling against enemy positions, where they perfected their tactics and captured prisoners for valuable intelligence gains. During Operation Diadem on 11 May 1944, the 349th Infantry attacked Mt. Bracchi, Mt. Cerri, Mt. La Civita, and the town of Spigno Saturnia after a tremendous artillery barrage. By the morning of 15 May, they had accomplished these objectives against strong enemy resistance, and managed to capture numerous enemy prisoners and even a German Panzer. The regiment was attached to the 85th Infantry Division for its attack on Hill 490 on the night of the 15th, and again encountered stiff resistance, but took the hill.

In September 1944, the 88th Infantry Division used the 349th Infantry Regiment as a rapid column to spearhead the drive north to Bologna. 1-349 cleared out the town of Belvedere after a fierce firefight, and by 2 October, controlled a ridgeline that overlooked the German positions. In the Po Valley Campaign, the 349th captured Monterumici after a tough battle that lasted from 15–21 April 1945, and moved on to cross the Po River on 24 April. Just before the end of the War in Europe, the 349th was briefly attached to the 103rd Infantry Division when they linked up in the Brenner Pass and drove into Austria against slight resistance.

== Post-War ==
When World War II in Europe ended, the United Nations created the Free Territory of Trieste, which elements of the 88th Infantry Division were ordered to garrison. The 349th did this duty for a while, until their deactivation on 7 October 1947. After several reorganizations in the United States Army Reserve between 1954-1999, the 349th Infantry serves today as the 349th Regiment, attached to the 85th Army Reserve Support Command (ARSC) providing equipment support to priority 1st Army Pre-Deployment training exercises throughout the continental United States as well as Post-Mobilization training at Mobilization Force Generation Installations.
