= Claude C. Bloch =

United States Navy admiral

Claude Charles Bloch
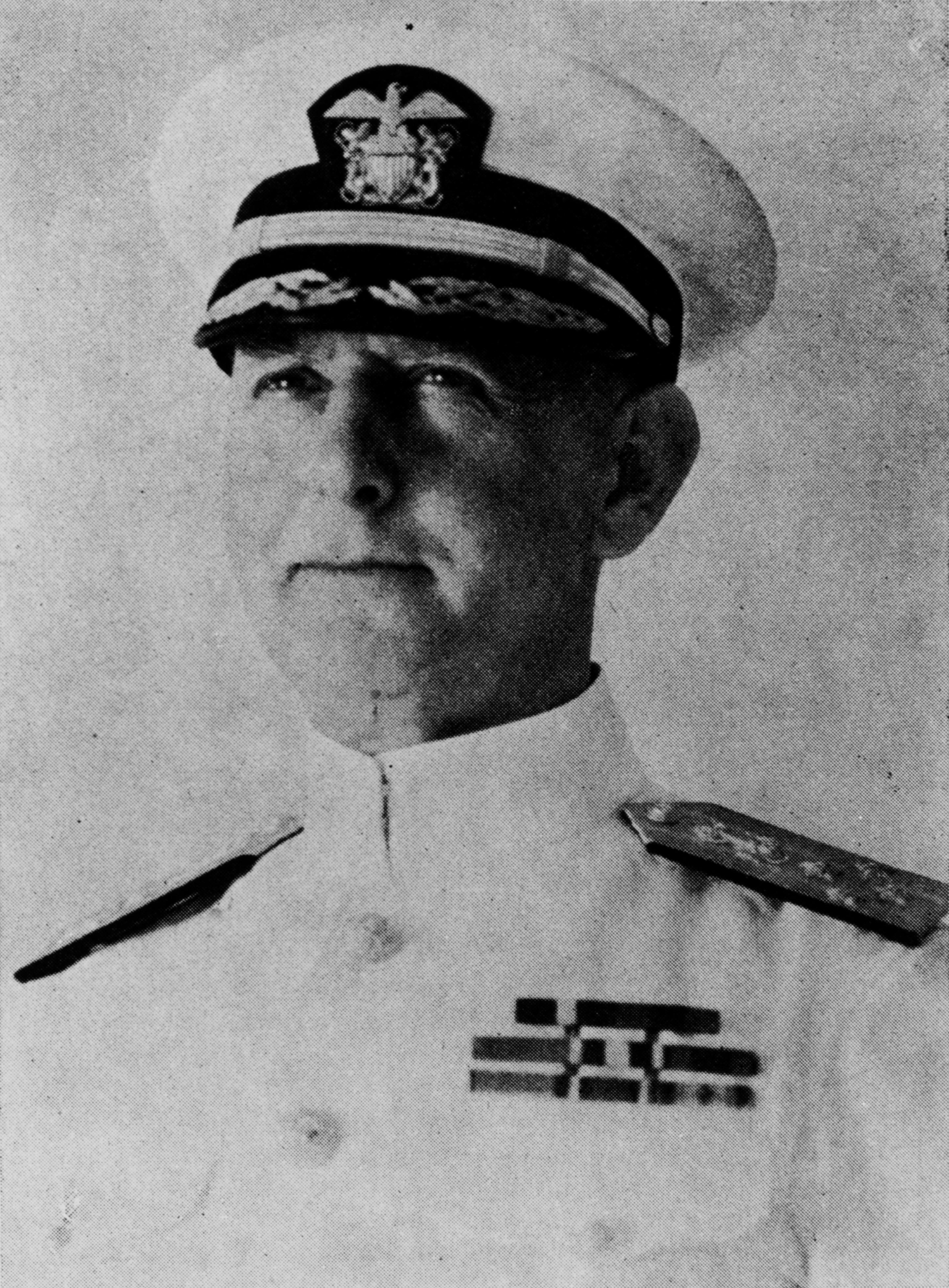
- Born: July 12, 1878; Woodbury, Kentucky, U.S.
- Died: October 4, 1967 (aged 89); Washington, D.C., U.S.
- Burial place: Arlington National Cemetery
- Military career
- Allegiance: United States of America
- Branch: United States Navy
- Service years: 1895-1946
- Rank: Admiral
- Nickname: Jack Dempsey of the Navy
- Commands: United States Fleet; Bureau of Ordnance; United States Navy Judge Advocate General's Corps; USS Plattsburg (SP-1645); USS California (BB-44); Fourteenth Naval District; General Board
- Conflicts: Spanish–American War; Boxer Rebellion; Philippine–American War; World War I World War II
- Awards: Specially Meritorious Service Medal; Navy Cross; Legion of Merit

Claude Charles Bloch (July 12, 1878 – October 4, 1967) was a United States Navy admiral who served as Commander, Battle Force, U.S. Fleet (COMBATFOR) from 1937 to 1938; and Commander in Chief, U.S. Fleet (CINCUS) from 1938 to 1940.

== Early years ==
Claude C. Bloch was born on July 12, 1878, in Woodbury, Kentucky, to a Jewish family. He went to Ogden College. He was appointed to the United States Naval Academy in Annapolis, Maryland, in 1895 from the Third Congressional District in Kentucky.

While he was still a midshipman, Bloch served aboard battleship USS Iowa during the battle of Santiago de Cuba. Bloch assisted in the rescue of Spanish sailors from the burning enemy ships and was subsequently awarded with the Specially Meritorious Service Medal.

He graduated from the Naval Academy on January 28, 1899, with the rank of passed midshipman.

He commanded USS Plattsburg during World War I and the USS California from 1927 to 1929.

=== Navy Cross citation ===
The official U.S. Navy citation for Bloch's Navy Cross reads:

Name: Claude Charles Bloch
Service: Navy
Rank: Captain
Company: Commanding Officer
Division: U.S.S. Plattsburg
Citation: The President of the United States of America takes pleasure in presenting the Navy Cross to Captain Claude Charles Bloch, United States Navy, for distinguished service in the line of his profession as Commanding Officer of the U.S.S. PLATTSBURG, engaged in the important, exacting and hazardous duty of transporting and escorting troops and supplies to European ports through waters infested with enemy submarines and mines during World War I.

== World War II ==
He served as the Commander-in-Chief, United States Fleet from 1938 to January 6, 1940, as was customary holding the temporary grade of admiral. Following this assignment, he reverted to his permanent grade, rear admiral, and commanded the Fourteenth Naval District at Pearl Harbor at the time of the attack. Shortly before the attack, he and Admiral Husband E. Kimmel discussed the possibly sighting and sinking of a submarine by the USS Ward. The two ordered that another ship be sent to investigate. Bloch was cleared of any responsibility for the unpreparedness of the US forces during the attack which was blamed on Admiral Husband E. Kimmel and General Walter Short and Bloch remained as commandant until April 1942.

He later served on the General Board of the Navy from 1942, retiring from the Navy later that year with the rank of admiral. He remained as chairman of the Navy Board for productions awards until the end of World War II and retired in 1946. Bloch was decorated with a Legion of Merit for his World War II service.

He died in Washington, D.C., on October 4, 1967, and was buried in Arlington National Cemetery.

Bloch was the highest ranking Jewish officer in the armed forces until well after World War II.

== Decorations ==
Admiral Claude C. Bloch's ribbon bar:

1st Row	Navy Cross	Legion of Merit	Specially Meritorious Service Medal
2nd Row	Spanish Campaign Medal	Philippine Campaign Medal	China Relief Expedition Medal
3rd Row	Cuban Pacification Medal	World War I Victory Medal with Transport Clasp	American Defense Service Medal
4th Row	Asiatic–Pacific Campaign Medal with one service star	American Campaign Medal	World War II Victory Medal

Military offices
Preceded by Arthur J. Hepburn	Commander in Chief, United States Fleet; 1938–6 January 1940	Succeeded by James O. Richardson
Preceded by Orin G. Murfin	Judge Advocate General of the Navy; 1934–1936	Succeeded by Gilbert Jonathan Rowcliff
