= USS Blue (DD-387) =

Bagley-class destroyer

Coordinates: 9°08′S 159°58′E

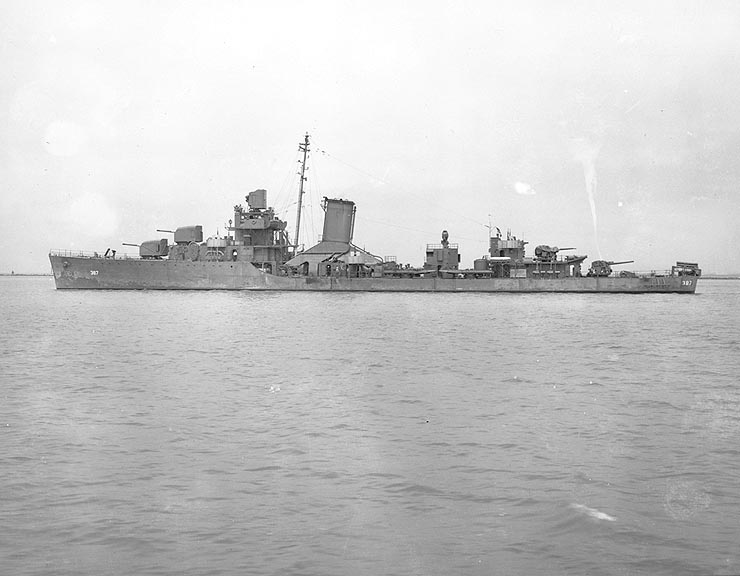
- USS Blue off Mare Island Navy Yard, California, on 11 April 1942

History

United States
- Name: Blue
- Namesake: Victor Blue
- Builder: Norfolk Navy Yard
- Laid down: 25 September 1935
- Launched: 27 May 1937
- Commissioned: 14 August 1937
- Honors and awards: 5 × battle stars
- Fate: Sunk Battle of Guadalcanal, on 22 August 1942

General characteristics
- Class & type: Bagley-class destroyer
- Displacement: 2,325 tons (full), 1,500 tons (light)
- Length: 341 ft 8 in (104.14 m)
- Beam: 35 ft 6 in (10.82 m)
- Draft: 10 ft 4 in (3.15 m) light, 12 ft 10 in (3.91 m) full
- Propulsion: 49,000 shp; 2 propellers
- Speed: 38.5 knots (71.3 km/h; 44.3 mph)
- Range: 6,500 nmi (12,000 km) at 12 kn (22 km/h; 14 mph)
- Complement: 158
- Armament: 4 × 5 in./38 guns (12 cm), 4 × .50 cal (12.7 mm) guns, 16 × 21 in (533 mm). torpedo tubes, 2 × depth charge tracks

USS Blue (DD-387), a Bagley-class destroyer, was the first United States Navy ship of that name, in honor of Rear Admiral Victor Blue (1865–1928). Blue served during World War II. She was launched 27 May 1937 by Norfolk Naval Shipyard; sponsored by Miss Kate Lilly Blue, sister of Rear Adm. Blue; and commissioned 14 August 1937.

== Service history ==
=== Inter-War period ===
After spending her first year in shakedown and training cruises along the east coast and in the Caribbean, Blue sailed for the Pacific in August 1938 to become flagship of Destroyer Division 7, Battle Force. She exercised with the Battle Fleet in west coast waters until April 1940, when she accompanied her division to Pearl Harbor. Except for an overhaul at Puget Sound Navy Yard (February–March 1941) and exercises out of San Diego during April, she remained based at Pearl Harbor until war broke out as the flagship of Destroyer Division Seven of Destroyer Squadron Four.

=== World War II ===
==== Pearl Harbor ====
The Japanese attack on Pearl Harbor 7 December 1941 caught Blue in port, but she safely made her way to sea with only four ensigns on board. She served with the offshore patrol in the approaches to Pearl Harbor during December 1941-January 1942.

==== 1942 ====
Blue joined Enterprise for air attacks on Wotje, Maloelap, Kwajalein Atolls, Marshall Islands on 1 February 1942, and the Wake Island attack on 24 February. During March–June 1942 Blue escorted convoys between Pearl Harbor and San Francisco and then proceeded to Wellington, New Zealand, where she arrived 18 July.

Blue joined Task Group 62.2 (TG 62.2) for the Battle of Guadalcanal on 7 August, providing fire-support and screening. Although present, she took no active part in the Battle of Savo Island on 9 August, but helped with evacuation of survivors from HMAS Canberra that was severely damaged in the battle. After patrolling off Nouméa, New Caledonia, from 13 to 17 August, Blue returned to Guadalcanal, arriving 21 August. At 0359, 22 August, while patrolling in "Ironbottom Sound" she was torpedoed by the Japanese destroyer Kawakaze. The explosion wrecked Blue's main engines, shafts, and steering gear, as well as killing nine men and wounding 21. Throughout 22 and 23 August, unsuccessful attempts were made to tow Blue to Tulagi. She was scuttled at 2221 on 23 August 1942 after all attempts to save her failed.

== Awards ==
Blue received five battle stars for her service in World War II.
