= SS Ryndam =

SS Ryndam may refer to two Holland America Line passenger ships:

- SS Rijndam, also commonly spelt Ryndam, launched in 1901 and scrapped in 1929
- SS Ryndam, launched in 1950 and sunk in 2003
