= Specially Meritorious Service Medal =

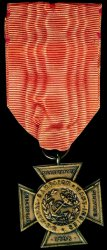
- Specially Meritorious Service Medal
- Type: Medal
- Presented by: Department of the Navy
- Eligibility: For acts of gallantry or heroism, not involving armed combat with an enemy.
- Status: Obsolete (de facto)
- ribbon

The Specially Meritorious Service Medal was a military decoration of the United States Navy which was created by Joint Resolution of Congress No. 18 of 3 March 1901. The medal was intended to recognize acts of non-combat meritorious service accomplished during the Spanish–American War.

== Description and symbolism ==
The ribbon to the Specially Meritorious Service Medal, 1898, is dark red and stands for sacrifice. Awarded to any member of the U.S. Navy, or United States Marines, the Specially Meritorious Service Medal was presented for acts of gallantry or heroism, not involving armed combat with an enemy, while operating in the territorial waters of Cuba in the year 1898. The medal was primarily awarded to those who had rescued sailors (both U.S. and Spanish) from burning ships following the Battle of Santiago de Cuba at Santiago, Cuba.

By 1935, the Specially Meritorious Service Medal had adopted the status of a commemorative medal; as late as 1942 it still appeared on official US Navy award precedence charts, between the Purple Heart and Presidential Unit Citation. An actual order from the Navy, declaring the decoration obsolete, was never published.

=== Obverse ===
In the center of a dark bronze cross pattée one and three-sixteenths inches wide, a medallion seven-eighths of an inch in diameter. The outer eighth-inch of the medallion, which is raised and forms a circle around the medallion, contains the raised inscription, U.S. NAVAL CAMPAIGN WEST INDIES. A small five-pointed star appears at the base between the words U.S. and INDIES, and an identical star appears between the words CAMPAIGN and WEST. The other words are separated by a bullet. In the center of the medallion there is a fouled anchor canted to the right and surrounded by a wreath of oak bearing nine acorns (to the right) and laurel (to the left). The wreath is tied at the bottom by a bow. The arms of the cross bear the following words: left arm, SPECIALLY; upper arm, MERITORIOUS; right arm, SERVICE; and lower arm, .1898. The edge of each arm is raised and contains a decorative border on the inside.

The anchor denotes naval service, and the wreath represents strength (oak) and victory (laurel). The inscription denotes the purpose of the medal. The small five pointed star represents military service.

=== Reverse ===
The reverse is blank and was used to inscribe the recipient's name along with a brief citation.

=== Ribbon ===
The ribbon to the Specially Meritorious Service Medal, 1898, is dark red and stands for sacrifice. The ribbon is nearly identical to that worn for the Navy Good Conduct Medal, and there were recorded instances of Navy enlisted personnel, who received both the Specially Meritorious Service Medal and the Navy Good Conduct Medal, wearing two identical ribbons for separate decorations.

== See also ==
- List of military decorations
- Awards and decorations of the United States military
