= Operation Infatuate =

Code name for a World War II Anglo-Canadian operation in November 1944

- Part of the Battle of the Scheldt
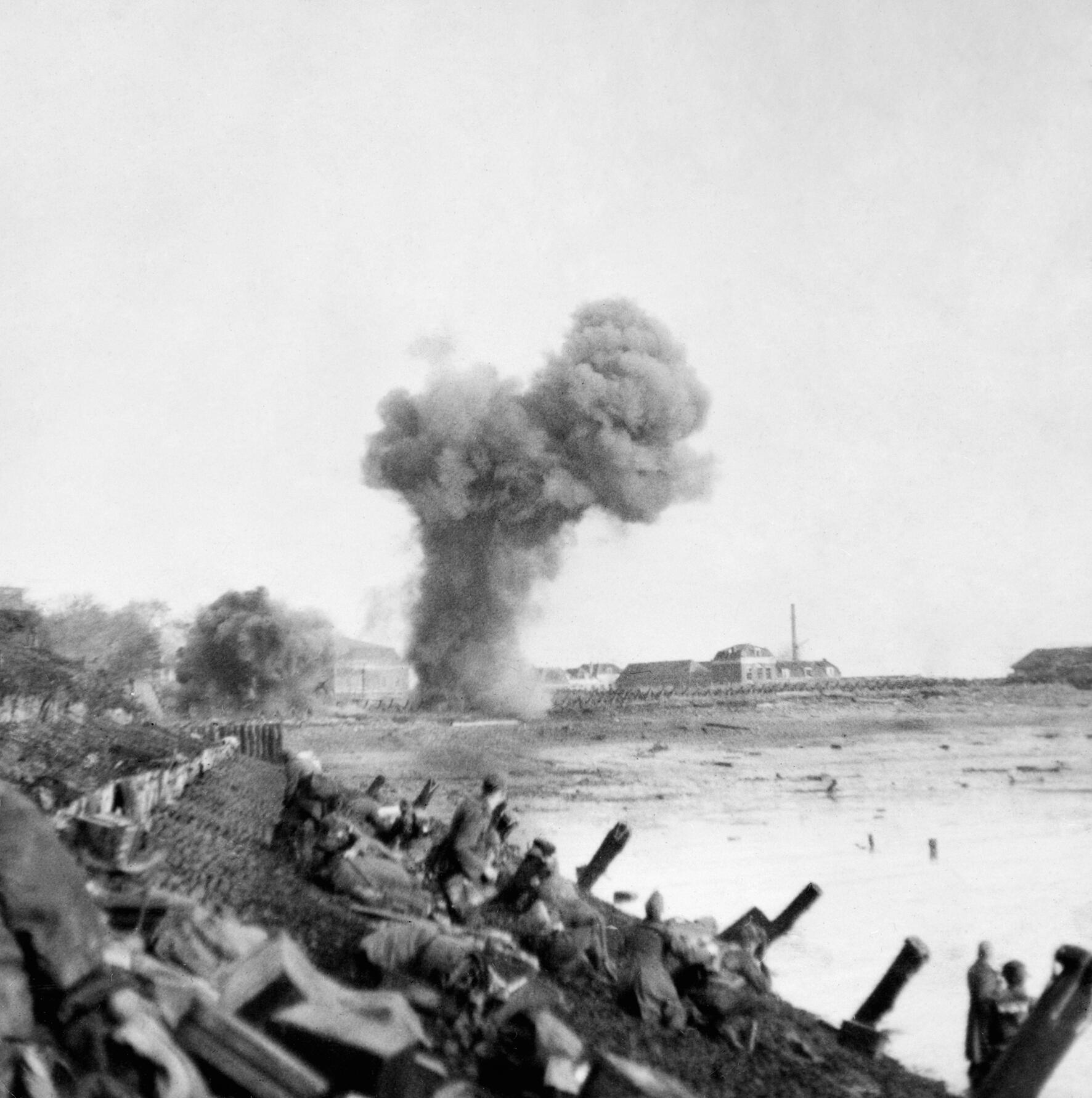
- British assault troops on Walcheren advancing along the waterfront near Flushing with shells bursting ahead - 1 November 1944.
Date	1–8 November 1944
Location	Walcheren Island and Scheldt estuary, Netherlands 51°30′11″N 3°42′18″E
Result	Allied victory

Belligerents
United Kingdom; Canada; Norway; France; Netherlands; Belgium	Germany

Commanders and leaders
(United Kingdom) Bertram Ramsay (Canada) Guy Simonds	(Nazi Germany) Gustav-Adolf von Zangen (Nazi Germany) Wilhelm Daser

Units involved
(United Kingdom) 4th Special Service Brigade (United Kingdom) 52nd (Lowland) Division (Canada) 2nd Canadian Infantry Division	(Nazi Germany) German 15th Army

Strength
3,082 Canadians, French (commando KIEFFER) and Royal Marines	5,000 troops

Casualties and losses
1,473 casualties including 489 killed, 925 wounded, 59 missing	1,200 killed and wounded 2,900 captured

Operation Infatuate was the code name given to an Anglo-Canadian operation in November 1944 during the Second World War to open the port of Antwerp to shipping and relieve logistical constraints. The operation was part of the wider Battle of the Scheldt and involved two assault landings from the sea by the 4th Special Service Brigade and the 52nd (Lowland) Division. Meanwhile, the 2nd Canadian Infantry Division would force a crossing of the Walcheren Causeway.

== Background ==
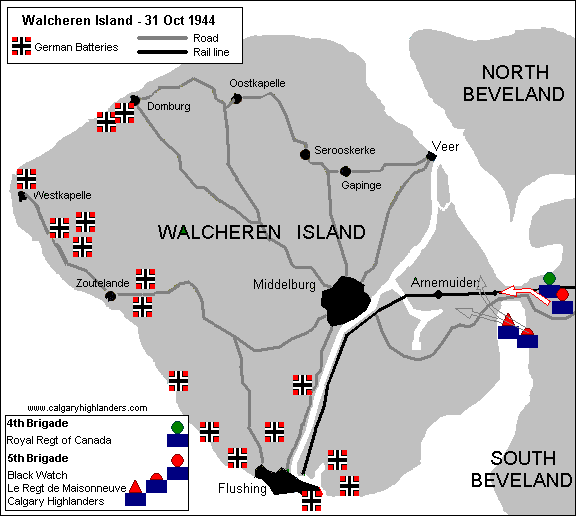
Walcheren Island

The city of Antwerp and its port was captured by British 2nd Army in early September 1944. While 21st Army Group's priority was then Operation Market Garden, no sense of urgency was placed in securing the approaches to the port facilities there. Walcheren Island, at the western end of the Beveland Peninsula, overlooked the Scheldt Estuary, and was strongly garrisoned by the German 15th Army who had emplaced strong concrete fortifications and large calibre guns which made it impossible to transit the waterway into Antwerp. Because of this delay, the remnants of the 15th Army "had been given the time to escape and reinforce the island of Walcheren and the South Beveland Peninsula".

The First Canadian Army was tasked by 21st Army Group to open the Antwerp area but in the meantime had also been detailed by Field Marshal Bernard Montgomery to capture the Channel ports of Boulogne, Dunkirk and Calais to ease the logistical concerns associated with drawing supplies from the Normandy beaches. The German tenacity in the Channel ports meant that the Allied supply lines would continue to extend the further away the front line advanced. The Channel ports were eventually "masked" when Montgomery changed his priorities to clearing the Scheldt after the failure of Operation Market Garden and the Canadians turned their attention to the Battle of the Scheldt. The First Canadian Army advanced north-west from the bridgehead in Antwerp and, after heavy fighting in early and mid-October, broke out onto the narrow isthmus which connected South Beveland to the mainland.

On 9 October 1944, Montgomery issued a directive directing the Canadian Army to give absolute priority to the clearing of the Scheldt over any other offensive operations. and ten days later the Canadians began their approach to Walcheren Island along the isthmus. To the south of the Scheldt, the Germans had been cornered in Zeebrugge, surrendering the Breskens Pocket on November 2. Both Zuid (South) and Noord-Beveland (North Beveland) had been virtually cleared and the time was right for the assault of Walcheren itself. The Allies' failure to take Middelburg after the Battle of Walcheren Causeway was a disappointing prelude to Operation Infatuate.

=== Prelude ===
A three-pronged assault was planned with British Commandos and part of the 52nd (Lowland) Division landing at Westkapelle in the west of the island and at Flushing in the south. The 2nd Canadian Infantry Division was to cross by a water channel close to the causeway in the east. However, in the Battle of Walcheren Causeway, it soon became clear that the tidal flats around the water channel were virtually impassable leaving the Canadians with the hazardous option of a direct assault along the well-defended causeway — an exposed stretch 40 yards (37 m) wide and 1,500 yards (1,400 m) long. The Canadians established a bridgehead on the island through which the British 52nd Lowland Division attempted to pass. Against much scepticism and opposition, the plan of Lieutenant General Guy Simonds (acting commander of First Canadian Army) to breach the island's dykes, and flood the interior, was adopted.

The plan to flood the island by bombing breaches in the dykes at Westkapelle, Flushing, and Veere, was controversial from the start. Simonds, the main protagonist, thought that it would enable the attackers to approach the German positions from both the sea and the inundated-inland sides with landing craft. But the Canadian engineer, Brigadier G. Walsh, who advised upon the matter pointed out that the breach would be too shallow for landing craft to pass through. The plan was apparently not discussed with the Dutch government-in-exile. When Prime Minister Gerbrandy got wind of the plan, he immediately demanded to see Winston Churchill, but Churchill denied any knowledge of the plan. When general Dwight D. Eisenhower approved of the bombing on 1 October, he appears not to have consulted the Dutch either. The military advantages of flooding the interior of the island were questionable, as it hampered both attackers and defenders. The German defenses were concentrated on the high-lying rim of the island; apart from the land-facing front in Flushing, there were no defensible positions inside the flooded area. The civilians living on the island were warned with leaflets dropped from planes to leave the area, but they had nowhere to go.

The bombing of Walcheren in October by RAF Bomber Command had deliberately breached the dykes around the island and had turned it into a massive lagoon, rimmed by broken dykes. The Germans had installed defences on the dykes to virtually turn them into a continuous fortification bristling with guns of every calibre. The British Marines placed great reliance on Weasel and Buffalo amphibious landing craft. The Royal Marine Commandos were to seize the shoulders of the gap in the dyke and then to fan out north and south to roll up the remainder of the German defences by linking up with the southern thrust. The RAF provided air support and the 79th Armoured Division provided specialist vehicles in support of the ground assault, naval gunfire support was from warships and landing craft equipped with artillery (e.g. Landing Craft (Gun)) and Land Mattress multiple-rocket launch systems.

=== Commando units ===
No.4 Special Service (Commando) Brigade and Royal Naval Beach Commandos. The Brigade comprised the following units: No.4 Special Service (Commando) Brigade HQ; No.4 (Army) Commando temporarily assigned to 155 Brigade; No.41 Royal Marine Commando, Royal Marines; No.47 Royal Marine Commando, Royal Marines; No.48 Royal Marine Commando, Royal Marines. Elements from 1 RM Engineer Commando; Elements from No.10 (Inter Allied) Commando.

No.4 (Army) Commando consisted of four Troops of British Commandos and two Troops from 1 and 8 (French) troops of No.10 (Inter-Allied) Commando. They were temporarily placed under the command of 155 Brigade to return to 4 Brigade as soon as they could be released. They crossed from Breskens and attacked Flushing.

The three RM Commandos along with the No. 4 (Belgian) and No. 5 (Norwegian) troops of No. 10 (Inter-Allied) Commando, commanded by Peter Laycock, landed at Westkapelle on the western side of the island. In support were 155 Infantry Bde. The Brigade had trained for this assault in the Ostend area during October.

No. 2 Dutch Troop of No. 10 (Inter-Allied) Commando moved to Bruges in Belgium on 20 October 1944 and was incorporated into No. 4 Commando Brigade. They split up and were attached to other fighting units where, in the case of some officers and men, their native language skills helped Allied liaison with the local population, while others fought alongside their comrades in arms.

== Landings ==
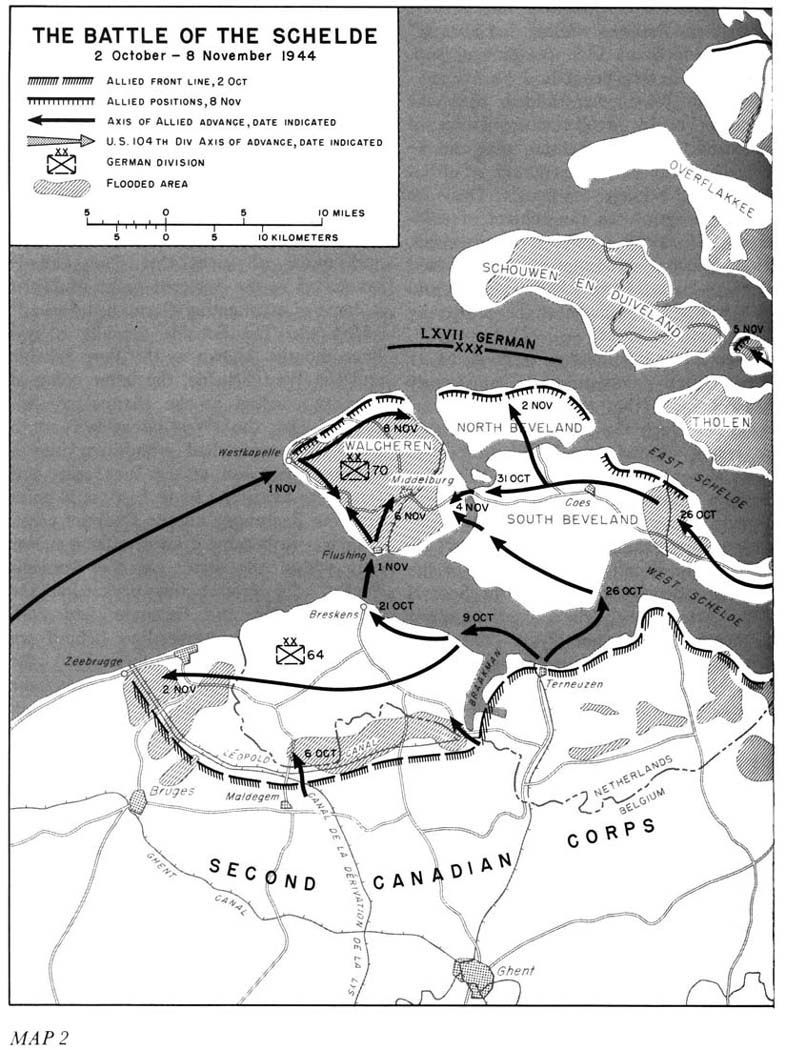
Map of fighting on and near Walcheren in October and November 1944

After some debate over the sea conditions the operation was planned for 1 November. On the day of the assault a heavy mist over Dutch and Belgian airfields limited RAF support for the actual landings, although the skies over Walcheren itself were clear.

=== Landing at Flushing (operation Infatuate I) ===
No. 4 Commando landed at 05:45 hours just east of the Oranjemolen, a windmill on the sea dyke at Flushing, with the main part of the troops arriving ashore at 06:30 hours. No. 4 Commando, under Lt-Colonel Robert W.P. Dawson DSO, had problems finding a suitable place to get ashore. Dawson sent a small reconnaissance party (known as Keepforce) ashore in two LCVPs. They were followed by Nos. 1 and 2 Troop, who secured the beachhead with minimal casualties and soon began to take prisoners. The main body came in at 06:30 hours, but by this time the Germans were alert and opened heavy fire with machine guns and 20 mm anti-aircraft cannon. Nevertheless, the Commandos got ashore with only a few casualties, although the Landing Craft Assaults (LCAs) containing the heavier equipment, including 3-inch mortars, hit a stake and sank some 20 yards (20 m) offshore. The mortars were salvaged.

The Commandos now fought their way through the German strongpoints. They were somewhat encumbered by the need to leave rearguards against infiltration. However, they were aided when the leading battalion of 155 Infantry Brigade began to land at 08:30 hours despite having lost two LCAs to heavy fire from one of the coastal batteries. German prisoners were pressed into service unloading stores and supplies. A good proportion of the defenders of Walcheren were poor-quality troops and many suffered from stomach complaints. The defence positions were well stocked with food and ammunition. By 16:00 hours the Commandos had reached most of their objectives and they decided to consolidate as the day drew to a close.

=== Landing at Westkapelle (operation Infatuate II) ===
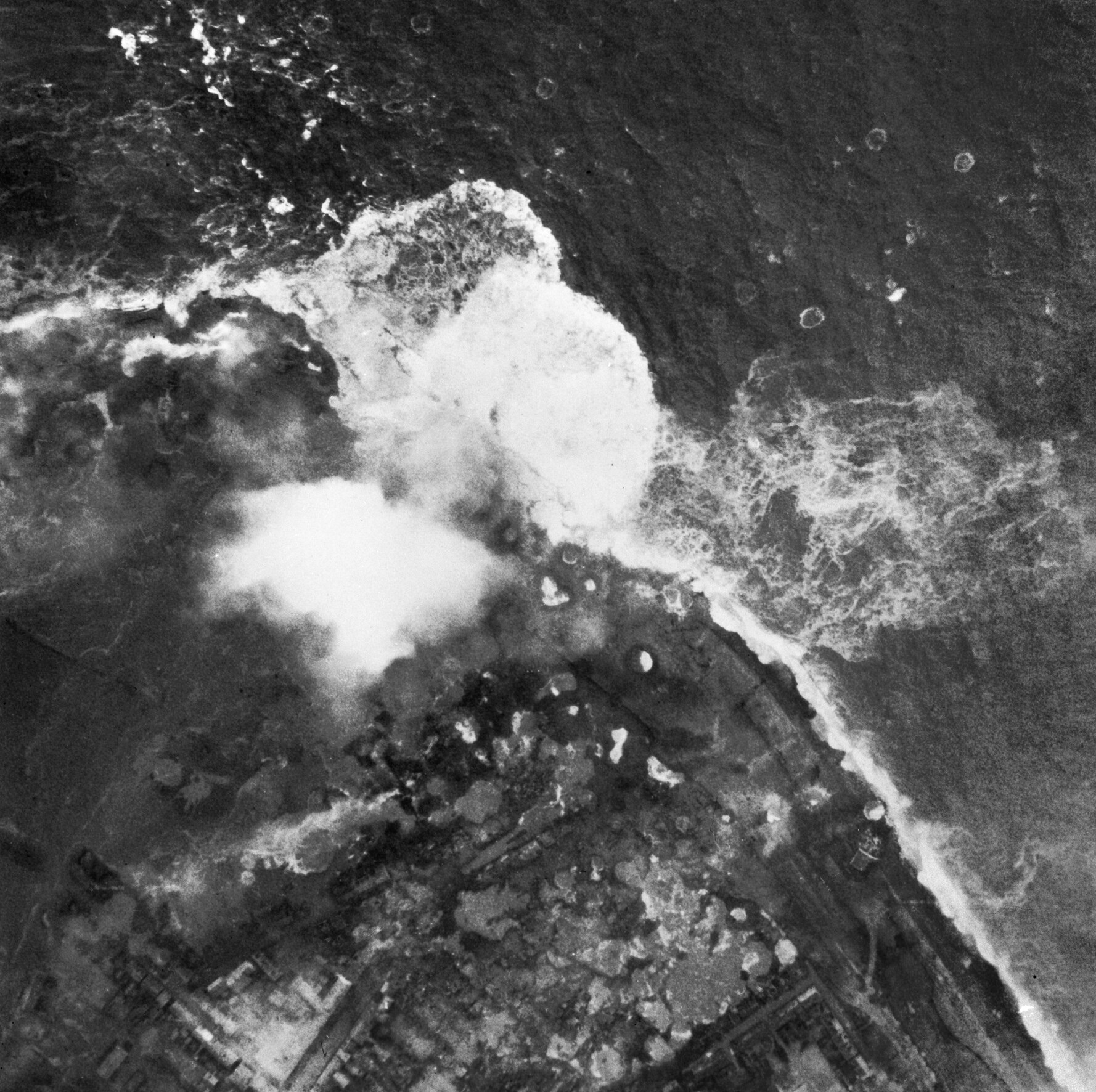
The battle for Walcheren Island: An aerial photograph of bombs exploding on the Walcheren dyke, the Netherlands during RAF Bomber Command's raid on the island.

Brigadier Leicester's plan for the attack on Westkapelle called for three troops of No. 41 (Royal Marine) Commando, under Lt-Colonel E C E Palmer RM, to land on the north shoulder of the gap blown in the dyke with the objective of clearing the area between there and the village of Westkapelle. The remainder of the Commando, along with the two No. 10 (IA) Commando troops, would then come ashore in M29 Weasels and Buffaloes launched from Landing Craft Tanks (LCTs). Their mission would be to clear Westkapelle and then move north. No. 48 (Royal Marine) Commando, under Lt-Colonel J. L. Moulton DSO, would use the same methods, but come ashore south of the gap. From there they would advance on Zoutelande some 3 miles (5 km) to the southeast. Finally No. 47 (Royal Marine) Commando, under Lt-Colonel C.F. Phillips, landed behind 48 Commando and drove on to meet up with 4 Commando near Flushing.

The force sailed from Ostend at 03:15 hours and by 09:30 hours they were off the objective. The ships bombarded the German defences with everything at their disposal including the 15-inch (380 mm) guns of HMS Warspite, Erebus and Roberts, the Landing Craft (Gun)s, the rockets of LCT(R)s. The first German fire at 8:09 was followed by the other batteries. Most of the German fire was concentrated on the support landing craft rather than those carrying the troops. Several landing craft were hit including a rocket LCT which received a direct hit, causing it to fire rockets at LCT(G)s located closer to the island, hitting five and wounding thirty, while some rockets from the other LCT(R)s fell short, hitting friendly craft. The RAF was able to provide a squadron (No. 183 Squadron) of explosive rocket-firing Typhoon fighter-bombers just at the point the LCTs were due to land.

Part of the naval Support Squadron of 27 small craft, under Commanders Sellar and Leefe, closed to engage the eleven still-operational German shore-based batteries, on the direction of Captain A.F. Pugsley, R.N., DSO, the naval commander of the amphibious landings. This they did with conspicuous gallantry, but with very heavy casualties. By 12.30pm, nine of the Support Squadron's craft had been sunk, eleven put out of action, and a high percentage of their crews killed or wounded. Ultimately the Support Squadron was recalled as so many of the craft had been damaged or destroyed, but their aim, of drawing the fire of the defending batteries from the landing craft making the primary assault, had succeeded.

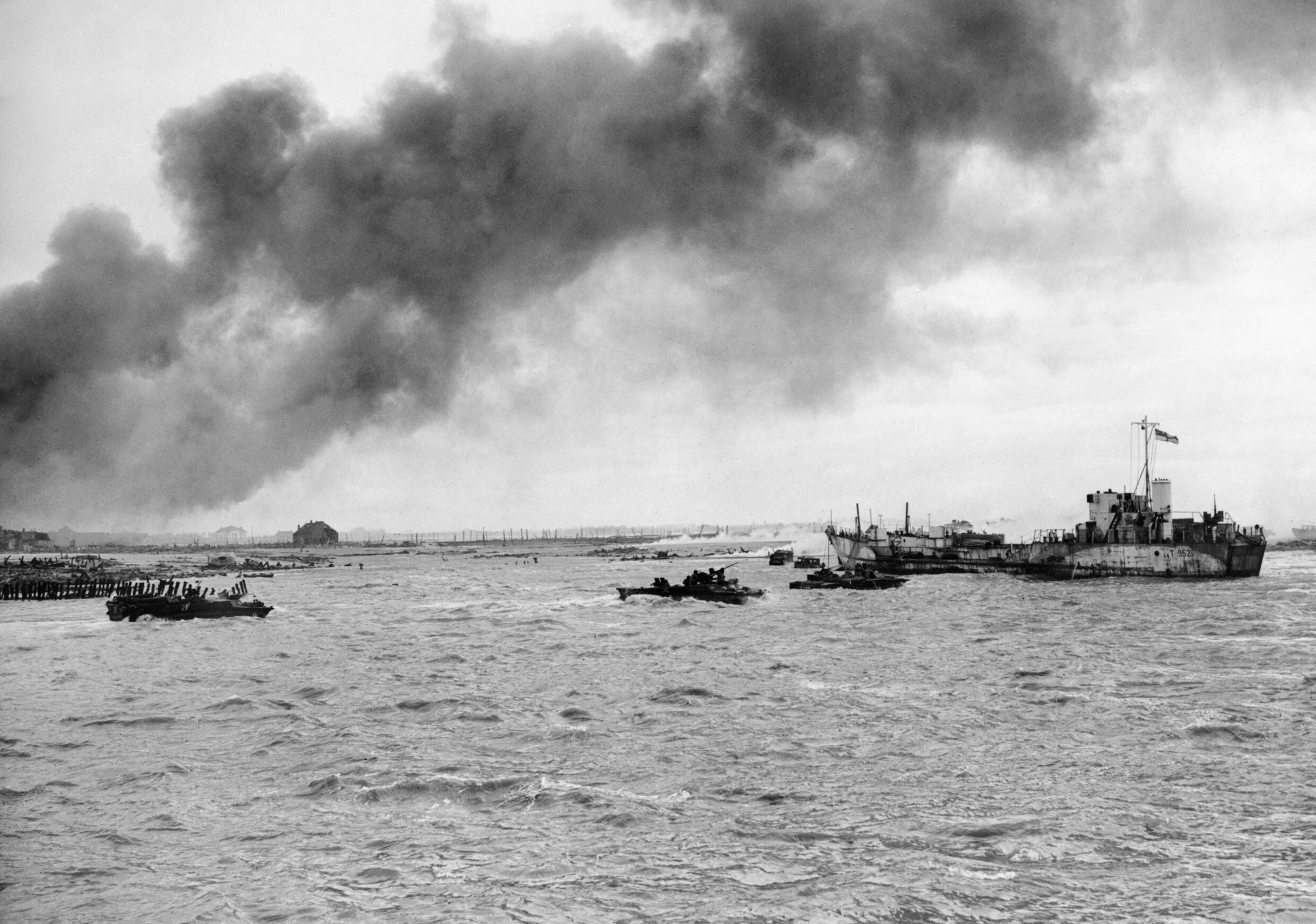
Royal Marine Commandos landing at Walcheren using DUKW's, LVT, LCT's and Buffalo amphibians on 1 November 1944

In a tribute to the bravery of the Support Squadron, General Robert Laycock, Chief of Combined Operations, wrote to Captain A.F. Pugsley with the following words:

"I understand that the success of the landings and the comparatively light casualties sustained by No. 4 Special Service Brigade at Walcheren was due largely to the efforts of the Naval Support Craft who, at great cost to themselves, effectively silenced the coastal defences. I should like to express the appreciation of all ranks, Special Service Group, and particularly that of General Sturges and Brigadier Leicester and all ranks of No. 4 Special Service Brigade for the self-sacrifice shown by all naval personnel during the landings, which had such splendid results."

The naval haul of gallantry awards was significant. Of particular note were the actions of Leading Seaman Owen Joseph McGrath who was Coxswain of a Landing Craft (LCP(L) 144) during the assault on Westkapelle. McGrath's citation for the Conspicuous Gallantry Medal (the highest award for gallantry available to non-commissioned naval personnel short of the Victoria Cross) reads as follows: "[LCP(L) 144's] duty was to make smoke on the Southern flank. Many craft were hit by the accurate enemy fire, and some blew up very close inshore under the enemy guns. LCP(L) 144 was ordered to close, make smoke and pick up survivors. This was done at point blank range with an off-shore wind making effective smoke difficult. By his courageous action Leading Seaman McGrath rescued over twenty survivors".

Back on the island of Walcheren, 41 Commando overran a pillbox in their path and pushed on into Westkapelle where they were met by a battery of four 94 mm (3.7 in) guns. These were reduced with the help of some tanks and the Commando then moved north along the dyke.

48 Commando came up against a battery of 150 mm (5.9 in) guns. The leading troop commander was killed and several men wounded in an attack on the position. Another attempt was met with intense mortar fire. Supporting fire was called in from the field batteries in the Breskens area together with Typhoon attacks. Following this action another troop went in under cover of smoke and reached the centre of the battery putting it out of action.

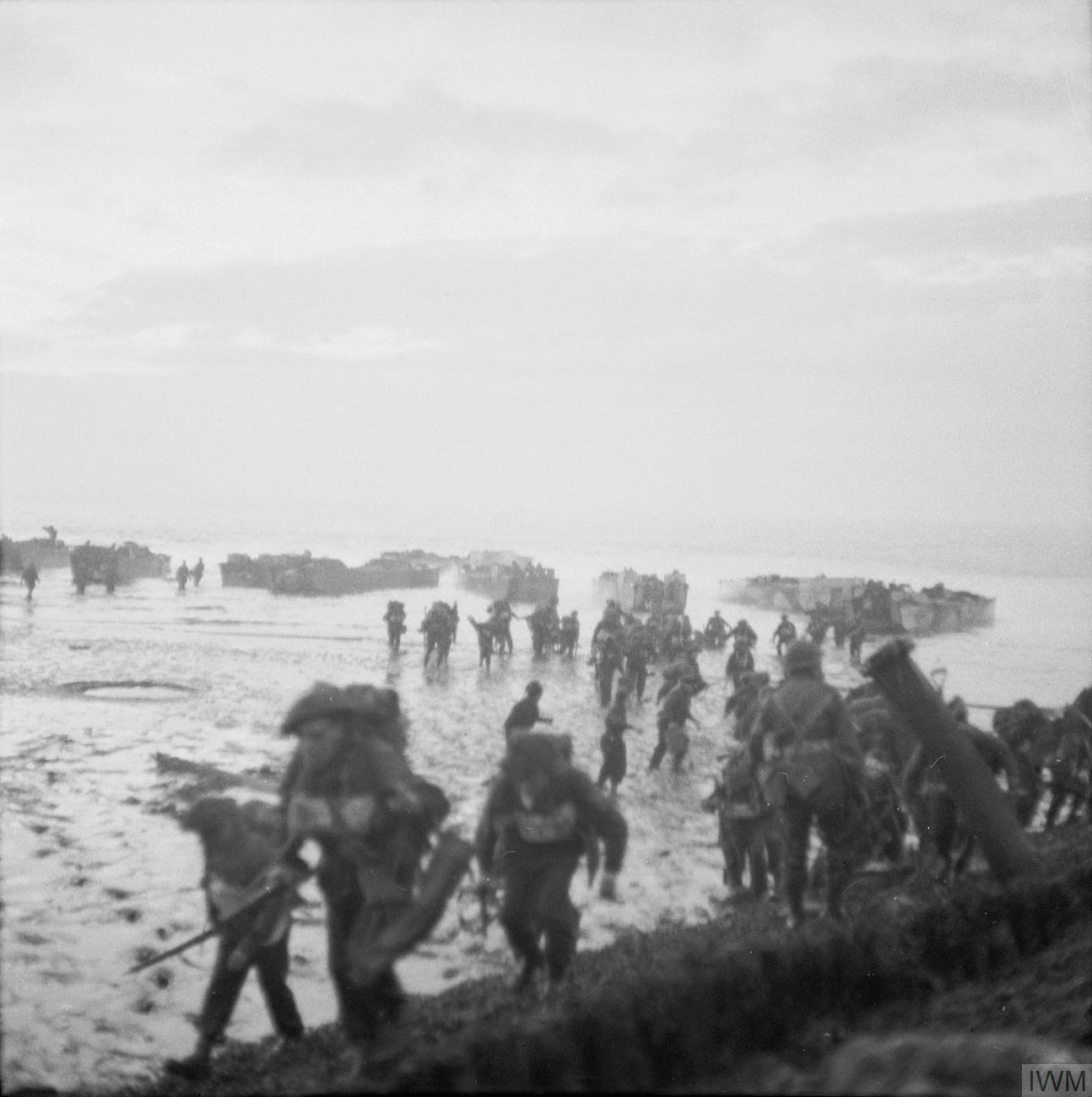
Men of the 4th Special Service Brigade wade ashore from landing craft near Flushing to complete the occupation of Walcheren

The next day 4 Commando, together with the 5th Battalion of the King's Own Scottish Borderers, continued with the battle for Flushing. No. 5 (Norwegian) Troop of 10 (IA) Commando were involved in an action against a strongpoint nicknamed 'Dover'. One section of the troop gained the roof of a cinema and opened fire on the strongpoint with their PIAT. The other sections moved along the street and through back gardens. As the Troop was preparing for the final assault, Typhoons attacked the enemy position. That afternoon the Troop resumed their advance and reached the corner overlooking their objective. One house remained occupied by the Germans and as they made for the strongpoint they suffered several casualties from the fire of No. 5 Troop. No. 1 Section was now by an anti-tank wall and firing PIAT bombs into the embrasures of the strongpoint at very short range. Corporal Lafont was on the point of breaching the strongpoint with a made-up charge at the ready when the German defenders surrendered.

No. 48 (RM) Commando pushed on at first light and took Zoutelande, meeting light opposition. 47 Commando took over the advance but soon came up against a strong fortified position with an anti-tank ditch and Dragon's Teeth. The weather had closed in and no air support was available so they attacked supported only by artillery. They came under heavy mortar fire and suffered several casualties. The other half of the Commando having moved along the dyke were confronted by another 150 mm (5.9 in) battery at Dishoek. Their approach was obstructed by pockets of resistance to the front of the battery which were not cleared until nightfall. The three Troops halted in front of the battery and repulsed a German counterattack just after they had been replenished with much-needed food and ammunition.

Defensive stakes and mines on the beaches made it difficult for supply craft to land stores. By the third and fourth days the Commando were forced to use captured German rations. To the relief of all concerned supplies were parachuted in on 5 November near Zoutelande.

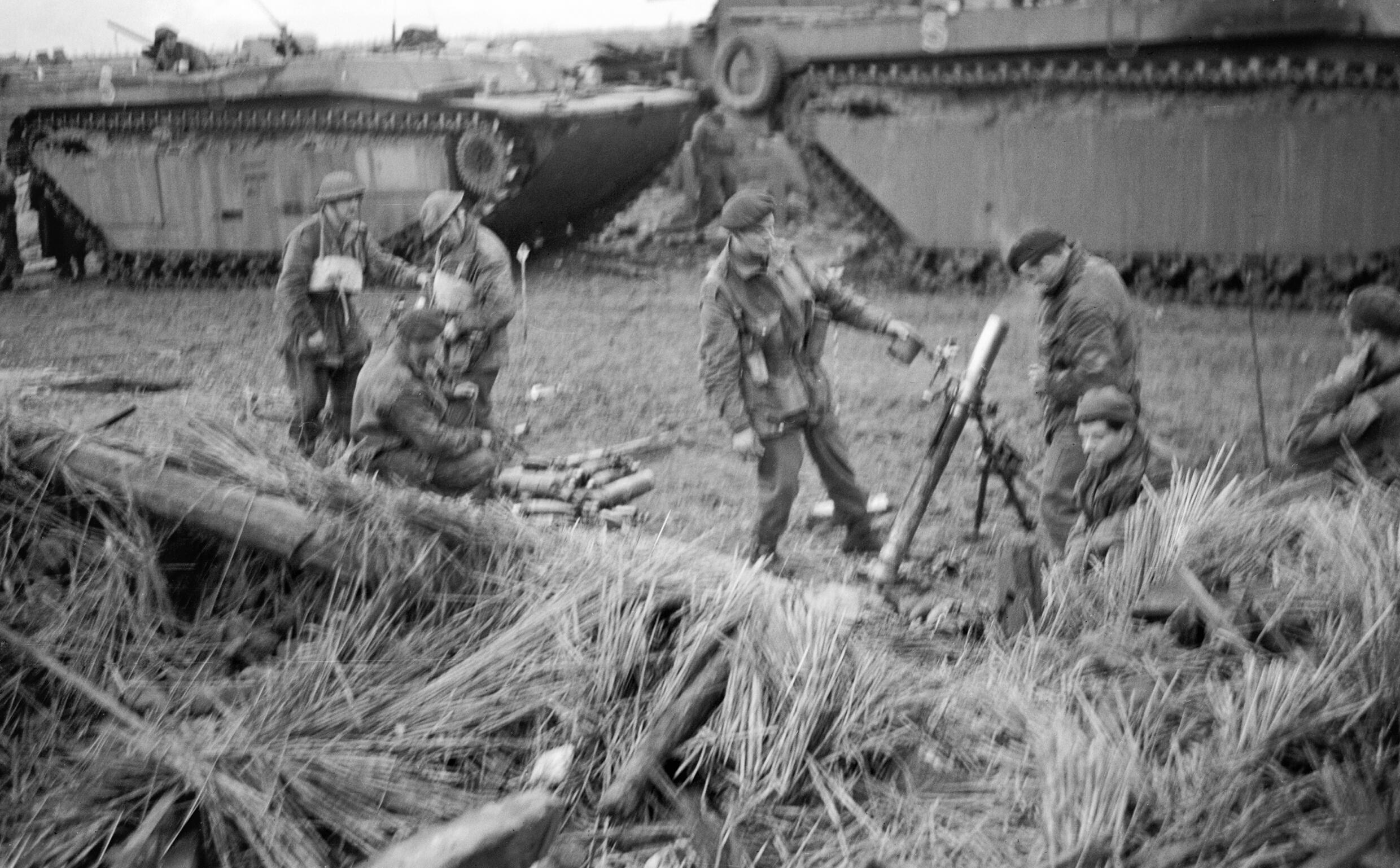
Marine Commandos operating 3" mortars behind the cover of amphibious vehicles - they are wearing Denison smocks

Nos. 41 and 10 Commando reached Domburg on the morning of 2 November where they encountered strong resistance. That evening Brigadier Leicester ordered No. 41, less one Troop, to assist No. 47 Commando in the south, leaving the Troops of No. 10 and one of No. 41 to finish mopping up Domburg. No. 4 Commando was relieved by 155 Brigade and embarked on Buffaloes to assault two batteries, W3 and W4, situated north-west of Flushing. They had been fighting for 40 hours and needed a well-earned rest. After landing in a gap in the dyke, about which little was known, Lt-Colonel Dawson asked Brigadier Leicester for a break of some 24 hours to rest his men. This was agreed, but it was well after dark before the Commando was relieved by 155 Brigade. In the event No. 47 (RM) Commando overcame the opposition at Dishoek later that day and linked up with 4 Commando. Meanwhile, No. 10 cleared Domburg, with the Commando's Norwegian Troop showing particular courage in the face of heavy opposition which cost them a number of casualties.

In the after-action report of the battle Captain J. Linzel of No. 10 Commando stated:

This operation had more impact on me. The objective was to clear the seaway to Antwerp. We went to Belgium, where the Nr4 Troops Brigade and the No10 Commando were billeted. We were an attached unit of 14 men. We entered our LCT's Buffalo's amphibious vehicles to go to Walcheren where we experienced heavy German Artillery. Our vehicle got hit direct by a grenade, setting our flame throwers and ammunition on fire. This was a chaos. Our burning Buffalo was pushed into the sea and I can remember that together with 10 other men I ended-up in another Buffalo and landed at Westkapelle. We experienced some serious fighting there and a lot of the Brigade were killed. It took us 3 days to capture the German dyke at Vlissingen, there were about 300 casements. Captain J. Linzel.

== Aftermath ==
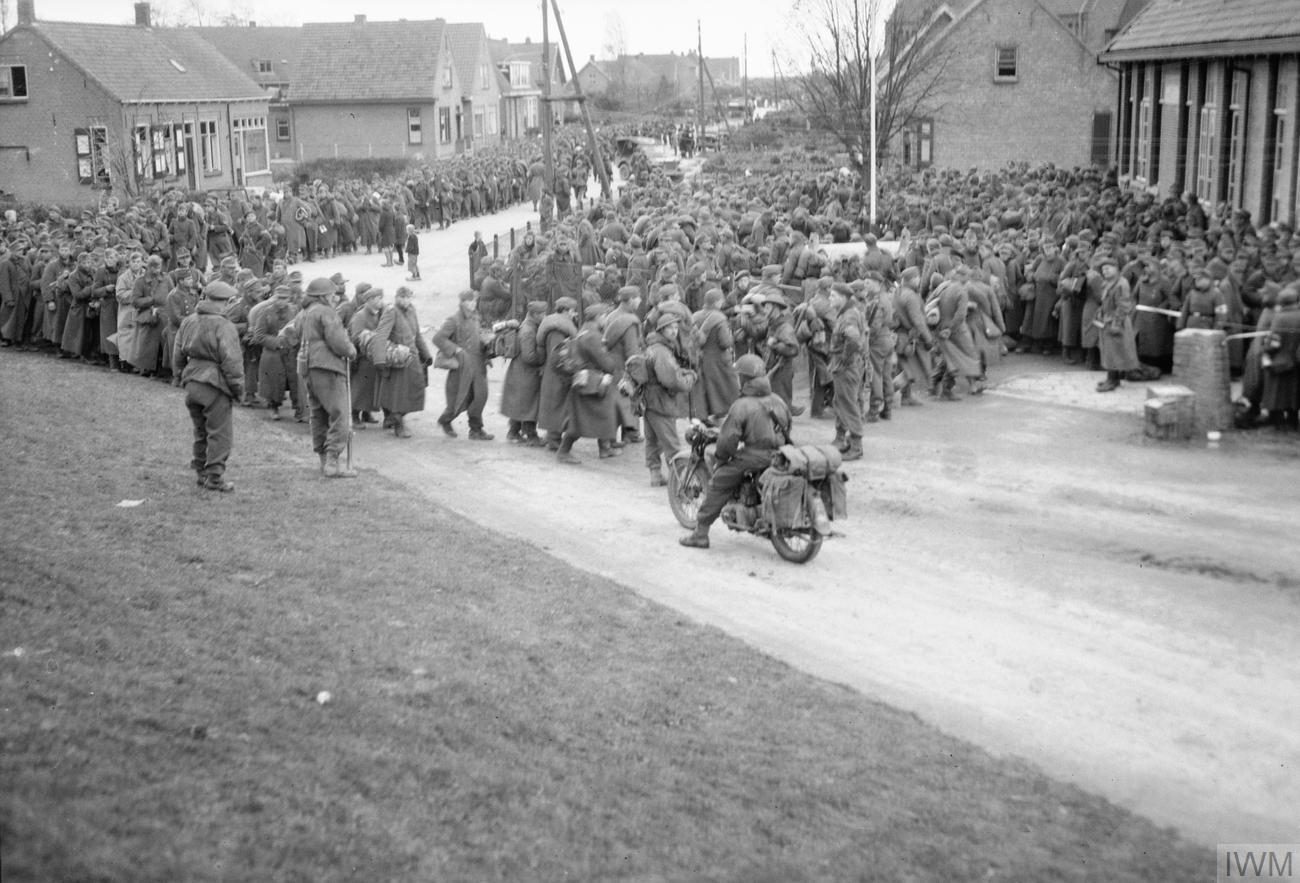
German prisoners on Walcheren - around 40,000 were taken after the operation had terminated

Nos. 4, 47, 48 Commandos then concentrated at Zoutelande and a two-day pause ensued while they re-supplied. The remaining enemy resistance was concentrated in the area north-west of Domburg. Nos.4 and 48 Commando set off on foot, although they used landing vehicles to cross the gap at Westkapelle, in order to reinforce No.10 and No.41. While No. 41 assaulted the last remaining battery, W19, No.4 cleared the Overduin woods and pushed on to Vrouwenpolder opposite North Beveland. No.48 remained in reserve - this phase of the operation began on November 8.

At 08:15, four Germans approached the Allied troops to ask for a surrender of all remaining German troops in the area. After some negotiation 40,000 Germans surrendered. No.4 SS Brigade had lost 103 killed, 325 wounded and 68 missing during eight days of fighting. By the end of November after a massive minesweeping operation of the Scheldt, the first cargoes were being unloaded at Antwerp.

=== Long-term after-effects for the civilians ===
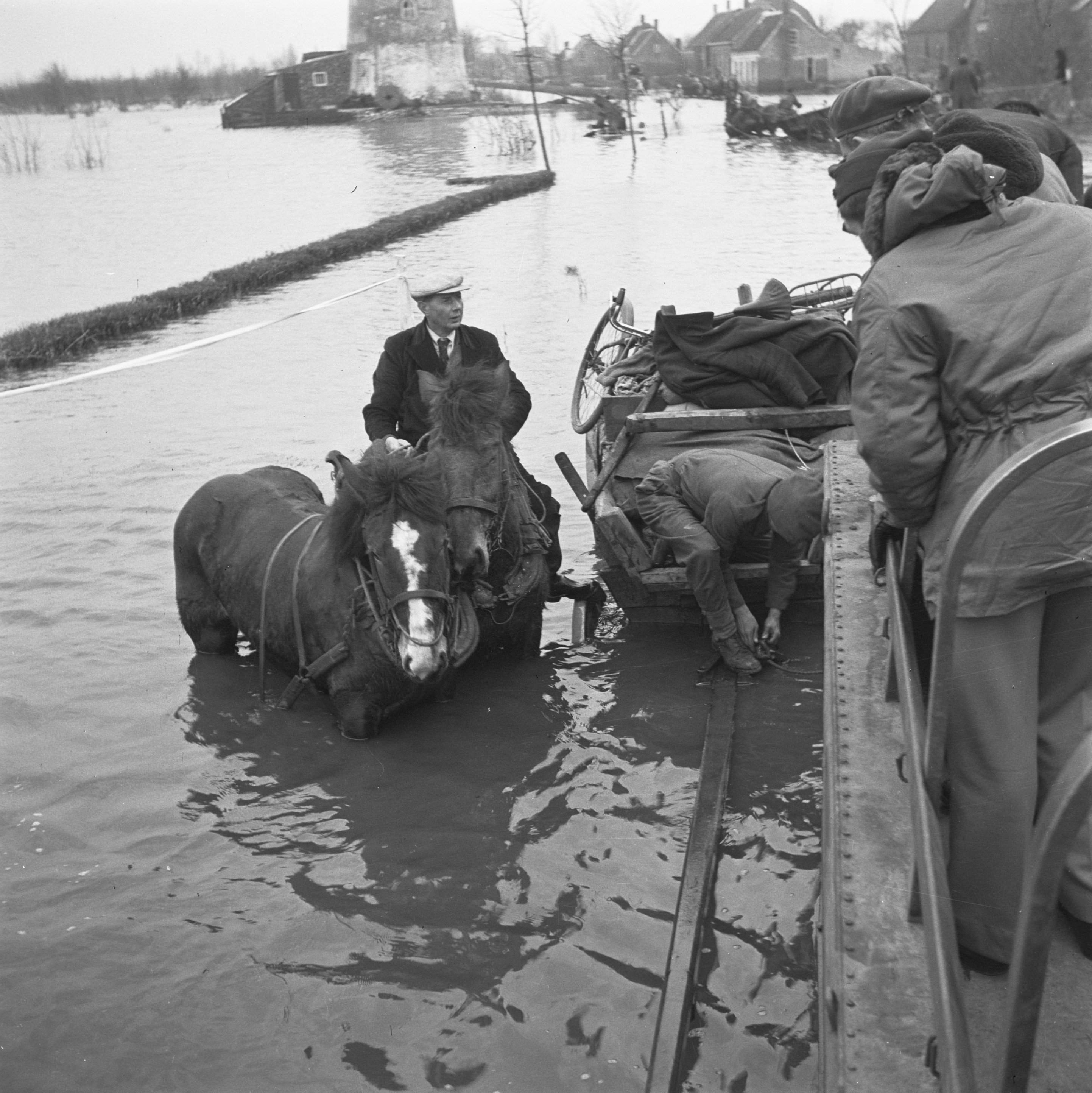
The British Deputy Prime Minister Clement Attlee (right, in the DUKW) visited inundated Walcheren in March 1945

The Inundation of Walcheren with which Operation Infatuate started, had long-term after-effects for the civilian population of Walcheren. Twice a day, at high tide and ebb tide, the sea water streamed with force through the breaches in the sea dykes, widening and deepening them. As a consequence, areas that fell dry at low tide were inundated again at high tide. Only the areas that were normally above sea level, like the town and village centres, remained permanently dry. Other low-lying areas, on the other hand, remained permanently flooded. This played havoc with Walcheren agriculture, as valuable land was permanently spoiled by salination. Because the pace of the flooding had been slow, loss of human life due to drowning had been minor, but most of the livestock drowned. Of 19,000 dwellings 3,700 were destroyed; 7,700 had severe damage and 3,600 minor damage.

Attempts to close the breaches already started in November 1944, but lack of building materials, and of heavy construction equipment, and the destroyed infrastructure, together with the extensive minefields, hampered these efforts. When in July 1945 the operations of closing the breaches started in earnest, the total width of the breaches had already increased to three kilometers. The great depth of the scoured-out breaches made simply moving earth into them infeasible. Therefore, surplus caissons that had not been needed to form the Phoenix breakwaters of the Mulberry harbours were used to block the deepest part of the breaches, after which normal dyke-building operations could proceed. The breach at Flushing was finally closed on 2 October 1945, followed by the breach at Westkapelle on 12 October. The third breach, at Veere, was closed on 23 October. Then the work of draining the flooded areas could start. To that end a breach was made in the western levee of the Canal through Walcheren. This made it possible to slowly drain the main mass of water through the locks at Veere and Flushing by opening them at ebb tide. But to completely drain the area additional pumping was necessary, which required opening the drainage ditches that had been silted up. The draining operation was finished in early 1946.
