= Wilhelm Daser =

German military officer

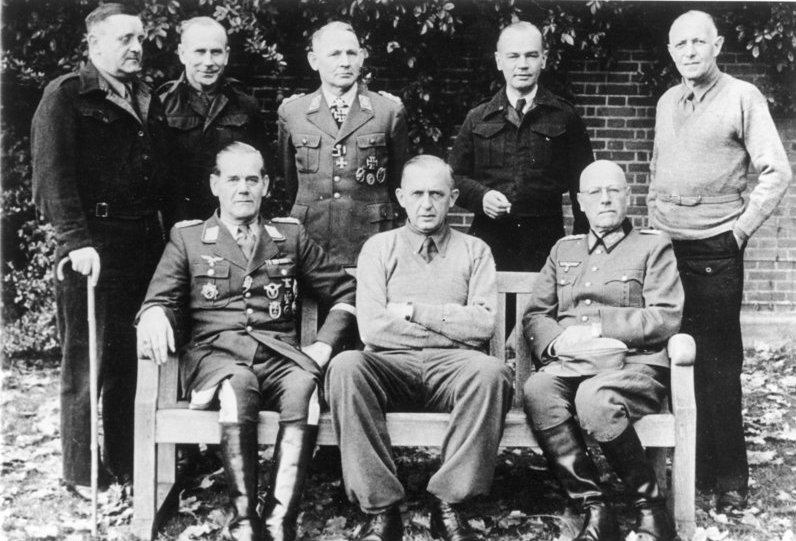
Generalleutnant Wilhelm Daser at Trent Park, sitting front extreme right

Wilhelm Josef Daser (31 August 1884 in Germersheim – 14 July 1968 in Ingolstadt) was a German military officer who commanded the 70th infantry division of the Wehrmacht during the Battle of the Scheldt and surrendered unconditionally on 6 November 1944 in Middelburg.

== Career ==
=== Promotions ===
Fähnrich (06 Jul 1903); Leutnant (08 Mar 1905); Oberleutnant (28 Oct 1912); Hauptmann (14 Jan 1916); Major (01 Dec 1926); Oberstleutnant (01 Feb 1931); Oberstleutnant a.D. (Note: "a.D." stands for ausser Dienst: retired.) (01 Oct 1933); Oberstleutnant (E) (Note: The "E" stands for Ersatzarmee (Replacement Army)) (05 Mar 1935); Oberst (E) (01 Aug 1937); Generalmajor (01 Jul 1942); Generalleutnant (Note: The equivalent rank in the Allied armies was Major General.) (01 Aug 1944)

=== Postings pre-World War I ===
Entered Army Service (06 Jul 1903);

Fähnrich in the 15th Bavarian Infantry-Regiment (06 Jul 1903-02 Aug 1914);

Detached to the War School in Munich (01 Mar 1904-28 Feb 1905);

Adjutant of District-Command Weilheim (01 Jun 1910-30 Sep 1912).

=== Postings World War I ===
Regiments-Adjutant of the 15th Bavarian Reserve-Infantry-Regiment 5 (02 Aug 1914-06 Oct 1914);

Taken ill (06 Oct 1914-06 Dec 1914);

Regiments-Adjutant of the 15th Bavarian Reserve-Infantry-Regiment 5 (06 Dec 1914-18 Feb 1918);

Adjutant of the 3rd Bavarian Reserve-Infantry-Brigade (18 Feb 1918-05 Jun 1918);

Commander of the III. Battalion of the 18th Bavarian Reserve-Infantry-Regiment (05 Jun 1918-15 Aug 1918);

Delegated with the Temporary Leadership of the 18th Bavarian Reserve-Infantry-Regiment (15 Aug 1918-02 Sep 1918);

Commander of the III. Battalion of the 18th Bavarian Reserve-Infantry-Regiment (02 Sep 1918-29 Sep 1918);

Delegated with the Temporary Leadership of the 18th Bavarian Reserve-Infantry-Regiment (29 Sep 1918-09 Oct 1918);

Commander of the II. Battalion of the 30th Bavarian Infantry-Regiment (09 Oct 1918-15 Oct 1918);

Delegated with the Temporary Leadership of the 18th Bavarian Reserve-Infantry-Regiment (15 Oct 1918-06 Nov 1918). (Note: This regimental history shows that Daser served most of the First World War in the Bavarian Ersatz Division, until that division was dissolved in October 1918, and the 18th Reserve regiment was merged into the 15th Bavarian division;Cf. Histories of the Two Hundred and Fifty-one Divisions of the German Army which Participated in the War (1914-1918) Compiled from Records of Intelligence Section of the General Staff, American Expeditionary Forces at General Headquarters, Chaumont, France, 1919. U.S. Government Printing Office. 1920. pp. 14–15, 261.)

=== Postings Weimar Republic/Reichswehr ===
Commander of the III. Battalion of the 18th Bavarian Reserve-Infantry-Regiment and Delegated with the Temporary Leadership of the 18th Bavarian Reserve-Infantry-Regiment (06 Nov 1918-21 Dec 1918);

Transferred back into the 15th Bavarian Infantry-Regiment (21 Dec 1918-18 Apr 1919);

Adjutant of the Volunteer-Detachment Schaaf (GroupHierl) (18 Apr 1919-17 May 1919); (Note: This was a Freikorps.)

Adjutant of Higher Disbandment Staff 104 (2nd Bavarian Division) (17 May 1919-25 Sep 1919);

Leader of the Mortar-Company of the 48th Reichswehr-Infantry-Regiment (25 Sep 1919-06 Nov 1919);

Leader of the 5th Company of the 48th Reichswehr-Infantry-Regiment (06 Nov 1919-01 Jan 1921);

Leader of the 5th Company of the 20th Infantry-Regiment (01 Jan 1921-01 Oct 1922);

Transferred into the 19th Infantry-Regiment and Adjutant of Infantry-Leader VII (01 Oct 1922-18 Apr 1925);

Transferred to the Mortar-Company of the 19th Infantry-Regiment (18 Apr 1925-01 Jan 1926);

Transferred to the Staff of the II. Battalion of the 20th Infantry-Regiment (01 Jan 1926-01 Feb 1928);

Commander of the Training-Battalion of the 21st Infantry-Regiment (01 Feb 1928-01 Feb 1930);

Commander of the II. Battalion of the 20th Infantry-Regiment (01 Feb 1930-31 Mar 1931).

Retired as an Oberstleutnant (31 Mar 1931).

=== German re-armament ===
Employed as a Civilian in the Army (01 Apr 1931); Territorial-Officer (01 Oct 1933); Supplemental-Officer (05 Mar 1935).

Ausbildungsleiter (Training-Specialist) in Regensburg (01 Apr 1931-01 Oct 1933); Border-Regiment-Commander Regensburg (01 Oct 1933-1 May 1935) Ausbildungsleiter Regensburg (1 May 1935-06 Oct 1936) Ausbildungsleiter Aschaffenburg (06 Oct 1936-26 Aug 1939)

=== Postings World War II ===
Commander of the 388th Infantry-Regiment (26 Aug 1939-25 Sep 1941). In this posting Daser took part in Operation Weserübung (the German invasion of Norway and Denmark in March 1940) as part of the 214th Infantry Division, which afterward was part of the German forces occupying Norway. But after the 1941 reorganisation in which the 388th regiment was detached to the Russian front, he received a temporary posting at the Replacement Army, where he would periodically reappear. Führer-Reserve OKH (25 Sep 1941-27 Dec 1941) Commander of the 251st Infantry-Replacement-Regiment (27 Dec 1941-15 Jun 1942) Führer-Reserve OKH (15 Jun 1942-20 Jun 1942)

In 1942 (after his promotion to Generalmajor (Note: This is commonly translated as "Major General". However the equivalent rank in the Allied armies was Brigadier general)) he received a number of appointments as (Ober)feldkommandeur in the German military administration in occupied France during World War II. Detached to the Staff of the Military Commander France for use as a Field Commandant (20 Jun 1942-01 Aug 1942) Field Commandant 580, Amiens (01 Aug 1942-02 Dec 1942) Field Commandant 894, Marseille (02 Dec 1942-15 Dec 1942) Senior Field Commandant 670, Lille (15 Dec 1942-10 Jun 1943) Field Commandant 454 (10 Jun 1943-22 Dec 1943)

In early 1944 he finally received appointments as a troop commander again. Führer-Reserve OKH (22 Dec 1943-01 Feb 1944) Commander of the 165th Reserve-Division (01 Feb 1944-15 May 1944) Commander of the 70th Infantry-Division (15 May 1944-07 Nov 1944)

As commander (now a Generalleutnant) of the 70th Infantry Division (Note: This was a unit of soldiers who in normal times might have been medically discharged for their chronic intestinal ailments. Now, however, they were concentrated in one organisational unit for reasons of efficiency. The special accommodations necessary for them had only to be made in this one unit; Cf. Rawson, pp. 24-25) he was charged with the defense of Zuid-Beveland and Walcheren after the collapse of the German front in Northern France at the end of August 1944 and the retreat through Belgium in early September 1944. In the course of Operation Infatuate the Inundation of Walcheren took place, and Daser became isolated in Middelburg in the center of Walcheren at the head of 2,000 soldiers. After the Allies established bridgeheads at Vlissingen and across the Sloedam causeway, and cleared the Westkapelle and Domburg Atlantic Wall gun emplacements, it became clear to him that the battle was lost, and he had his willingness to surrender on terms broadcast on the Canadian frequencies. Because a large number of Dutch civilians had fled to Middelburg due to the military inundation of the island, Daser agreed to an unconditional surrender of the city to avoid bloodshed on 6 November 1944. (Note: Mallett notes that Daser surrendered despite the threat that his relatives might be taken into Sippenhaft as there was an explicit prohibition against surrender issued by the German High Command before the battle. Cf.. Mallett, p. 47)

=== Prisoner of war ===
Daser was in captivity from 07 Nov 1944 to 19 Dec 1949. At first, he was taken to the special prisoner of war detention center for general officers at Trent Park. (Note: This camp has achieved notoriety after it was disclosed that the British captors secretly recorded the conversations of the inmates; Cf. Mallett, pp. 24, 50.) In May 1945, that center became overcrowded, and it is suggested he was transferred to the POW Camp Clinton in the U.S. He nevertheless never went to the US, but was transferred to France where he was in Lager 19 at Foucarville near Cherbourg from 4 May 1945 to 7 September 1945. Fifteen further internment camps in Germany and France followed. He stayed at the Zuffenhausen POW camp in Germany for the period 9 March to 26 April 1946 and was released only a few years later (19 Dec 1949). By that time, he was 65 years of age. He spent the final years of his life as a private citizen.

== Awards ==
- 1914 Eisernes Kreuz, 1. Klasse
- 1914 Eisernes Kreuz, 2. Klasse
- Kgl. Bayer. Prinz-Regent-Luitpold Jubiläums-Medaille
- Kgl. Bayer. Militär-Verdienstorden IV. Klasse mit Schwertern
- Ritter Kreuz I. Klasse des Kgl. Württembg. Friedrichs-Ordens mit Schwertern
- Kgl. Bayer. Militär-Verdienstorden IV. Klasse mit Schwertern und mit der Krone
- Ehrenkreuz für Frontkämpfer
- Wehrmacht-Dienstauszeichnung IV. bis I. Klasse
- Spange zum EK I
- Spange zum EK II

== Sources ==
- "Generalleutnant Wilhelm Daser". Axis Biographical Research an apolitical military history site.
- Mallett, D.R. (2013). Hitler's Generals in America: Nazi POWs and Allied Military Intelligence. University Press of Kentucky.
- Rawson, A. (2003). Walcheren: Operation Infatuate. Pen and Sword.
