= Battle of the Scheldt =

1944 operations to open Antwerp to Allied shipping during WW2

- Part of the Allied advance from Paris to the Rhine in the Western Front of World War II
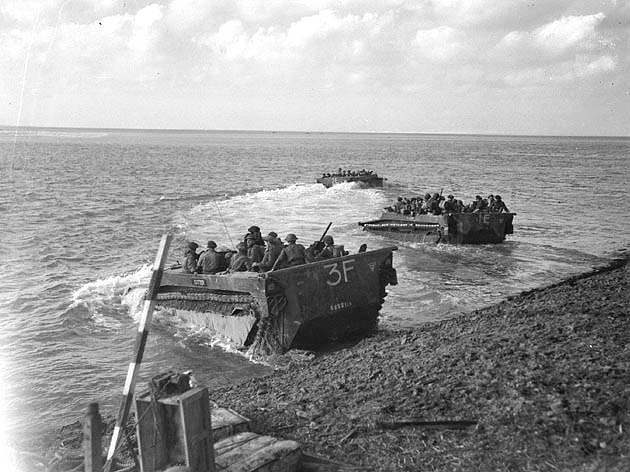
- Buffalo amphibious vehicles taking Canadian troops; across the Scheldt in Zeeland, 1944
| Date | 2 October – 8 November 1944 |
| Location | Dutch Zeeland and northern Belgium 51°25′N 4°10′E |
| Result | Allied victory |
| Territorial changes | Antwerp opened to Allied shipping |

Belligerents
| Canada; United Kingdom; Poland; United States; Belgium; Netherlands; France; Norway | Germany |

Commanders and leaders
| (United Kingdom) Bernard Montgomery; (Canada) Guy Simonds; (Canada) Harry Crerar; (United Kingdom) Bertram Ramsay | (Nazi Germany) Gustav-Adolf von Zangen |

Units involved
| (Canada) First Canadian Army (United Kingdom) British Army I Corps | (Nazi Germany) 15th Army |

Strength
| more than 450,000 | 230,000 |

Casualties and losses
| Canadian: 6,367; Total: 20,873 | Roughly 10–13,000; 41,043 captured |

The Battle of the Scheldt in World War II was a series of military operations to open up the Scheldt river between Antwerp and the North Sea for shipping, so that Antwerp's port could be used to supply the Allies in north-west Europe. The operations were carried out by the First Canadian Army, with assistance from Polish and British units which had been attached. The action was under the acting command of the First Canadian's Lieutenant-General Guy Simonds. The battle took place in the vicinity of the Scheldt river in northern Belgium and southwestern Netherlands from 2 October to 8 November 1944.

The Canadians had been delayed for more than a month, and the need to clear the Scheldt had not yet been addressed, due to Allied decisions to spend September focusing on Arnhem (Operation Market Garden), Boulogne (Operation Wellhit), Calais (Operation Undergo) and the opening weeks of the Siege of Dunkirk. By the time the Canadians were sent into the Battle of the Scheldt, the Wehrmacht defenders had been reinforced. The Germans staged an effective delaying action during which they flooded land areas in the Scheldt estuary and slowed the Allied advance. After five weeks of difficult fighting, the Canadian First Army, at a cost of 20,873 Allied casualties (6,367 of them Canadian), was successful in clearing the Scheldt after numerous amphibious assaults, obstacle crossings and costly assaults over open ground.

Once the German defenders were no longer a threat, it took another three weeks to de-mine the harbours; the first convoy carrying Allied supplies could not unload in Antwerp until 28 November 1944. Once Antwerp was opened, it allowed 2.5 million tons of supplies to arrive at that port between November 1944 and April 1945, which were critical to the successful Allied advance into Germany in 1945.

== Background ==
Following the Allied breakout after success in the battle of Normandy, they began a series of rapid advances into the Low Countries, far from their initial avenues of supply along the northern coast of France. By the autumn of 1944, captured ports like Cherbourg were far away from the front line, stretching Allied supply lines and causing great logistical problems.

Antwerp is a deep-water inland port close to Germany. It is connected to the North Sea via the river Scheldt, which allows the passage of ocean-going ships. Following the destruction of Rotterdam in 1940, Antwerp was the largest surviving port in Western Europe, and the obvious choice to support an invasion of Germany. This had been recognized as early as December 1941, when the Anglo-US armies made their first plans for a European offensive.

The White Brigade of the Belgian resistance seized the port of Antwerp before the Germans could destroy it as they were planning to do. On 4 September, Antwerp was taken by the 11th Armoured Division with its harbour 90% intact. However, the Germans had heavily fortified Walcheren peninsula at the mouth of the Western Scheldt, establishing well dug-in artillery impervious to air attack and controlling access to the river. This made it impossible for Allied minesweepers to clear the river and open the port at Antwerp. As part of the Atlantic Wall, Walcheren peninsula was described as the "strongest concentration of defences the Nazis had ever constructed.

=== Allied preparations ===
On 5 September, SHAEF's naval commander, Admiral Sir Bertram Ramsay, advised the Commander of 21st Army Group, General Bernard Montgomery, to make the Scheldt his main priority. He had previously said that as long as the mouth of the river was in German hands, the Port of Antwerp would be as useful as Timbuktoo. That same day, thanks to Ultra intelligence, Montgomery became aware of Hitler's intention to hold the Scheldt at all costs. However, Montgomery was focused on preparations for the ill-fated Operation Market Garden later that month. Among the Allied senior leaders, only Ramsay saw opening Antwerp as crucial to sustaining the advance into Germany.

Montgomery had an additional incentive not to prioritize Antwerp: his apparent desire for the 21st Army Group to spearhead the invasion of Germany and capture Berlin. On 9 September Montgomery wrote to Field Marshal Sir Alan Brooke (the Chief of the Imperial General Staff) that "one good Pas de Calais port" would be able to meet the logistical needs of the 21st Army Group, though not the US armies in France. Three days earlier, on 6 September, Montgomery ordered Canadian General Harry Crerar to prioritize the capture of just such a port, Boulogne-sur-Mer. Montgomery's views obliged Eisenhower to support a plan for the 21st to invade Germany, whereas the use of Antwerp would allow all of the armies to be supplied for such an invasion.

Due to these factors, little was done about Antwerp during September. On 12–13 September, Montgomery ordered the First Canadian Army to clear the Scheldt after taking Boulogne, Calais (Operation Undergo), and Dunkirk (Siege); General Crerar stated that this was impossible because he did not have sufficient manpower. Montgomery refused Crerar's request to have British XII Corps under General Neil Ritchie assigned to help clear the Scheldt, because he needed XII Corps for Operation Market Garden.

Had Montgomery secured the Scheldt Estuary, as Ramsay had advised, Antwerp would have been opened to Allied shipping far earlier than it was, and the escape of the German 15th Army from France could have been stopped. Instead, the delay allowed the German 15th Army to deploy defensively and prepare for the expected advance.

=== German positions ===
Walcheren peninsula was held by a mixture of Kriegsmarine (German navy) and Heer (army) personnel, commanded by General Wilhelm Daser. Its garrison consisted of the 202nd Naval Coastal Artillery Battalion, 810th Naval Anti-Aircraft Battalion, 89th Fortress Regiment, and 70th Infantry Division.

Additionally, as part of Operation Fortitude (the deception plan for the Normandy invasion), the Allies had tricked the Germans into believing they would land in the Pas-de-Calais region of France instead of Normandy. As such, the Wehrmacht had reinforced the 15th Army in the Pas-de-Calais, providing a critical mass of troops and materiel close to the mouth of the Scheldt.

Adolf Hitler ordered planning for what became the Ardennes Offensive in September 1944, the objective of which was retaking Antwerp. Hitler ordered the 15th Army to hold the mouth of the river Scheldt at all costs, calling the island "Fortress Walcheren."

The Germans at Walcheren were on the far right of the German line, and were deprived of supplies as the Wehrmacht focused its strength on the planned Ardennes offensive and replacing losses elsewhere. However, the flat polder ground of the Dutch countryside favoured the defensive, and was felt to compensate for the 15th Army's reduced numbers. Field Marshal Gerd von Rundstedt told General Gustav-Adolf von Zangen: "Enemy supplies, and therefore, his ability to fight, is limited by the stubborn defence of the Harbour, as intelligence reports prove. The attempt of the enemy to occupy the Western Scheldt in order to obtain the free use of the harbour of Antwerp must be resisted to the utmost. In his orders to his men, Von Zangen declared:

Therefore, I order all commanders as well as the National Socialist indoctrination officers to instruct the troops in the clearest and most factual manner in the following points: Next to HAMBURG, ANTWERP is the largest port in Europe. Even in the First World War, Churchill, in person, travelled to ANTWERP in order to organize the defence of the harbour because he appreciated it as of vital importance to the struggle on the continent. At that time, Churchill's plan was completely shattered; the same must happen again. After overrunning the SCHELDT fortifications, the English would finally be in a position to land great masses of material in a large and completely protected harbour. With this material they might deliver a death blow at the NORTH GERMAN plain and at BERLIN before the onset of winter...The enemy knows that he must assault the European fortress as speedily as possible before its inner lines of resistance are fully built up and occupied by new divisions. For this, he needs the ANTWERP harbour. And for this reason, we must hold the SCHELDT fortifications to the end. The German people are watching us. In this hour, the fortifications along the SCHELDT occupy a role which is decisive for the future of our people. Each additional day will be vital that you deny the port of ANTWERP to the enemy and the resources he has at his disposal. (signed) v. ZANGEN General der Infanterie.

=== Plan of attack ===
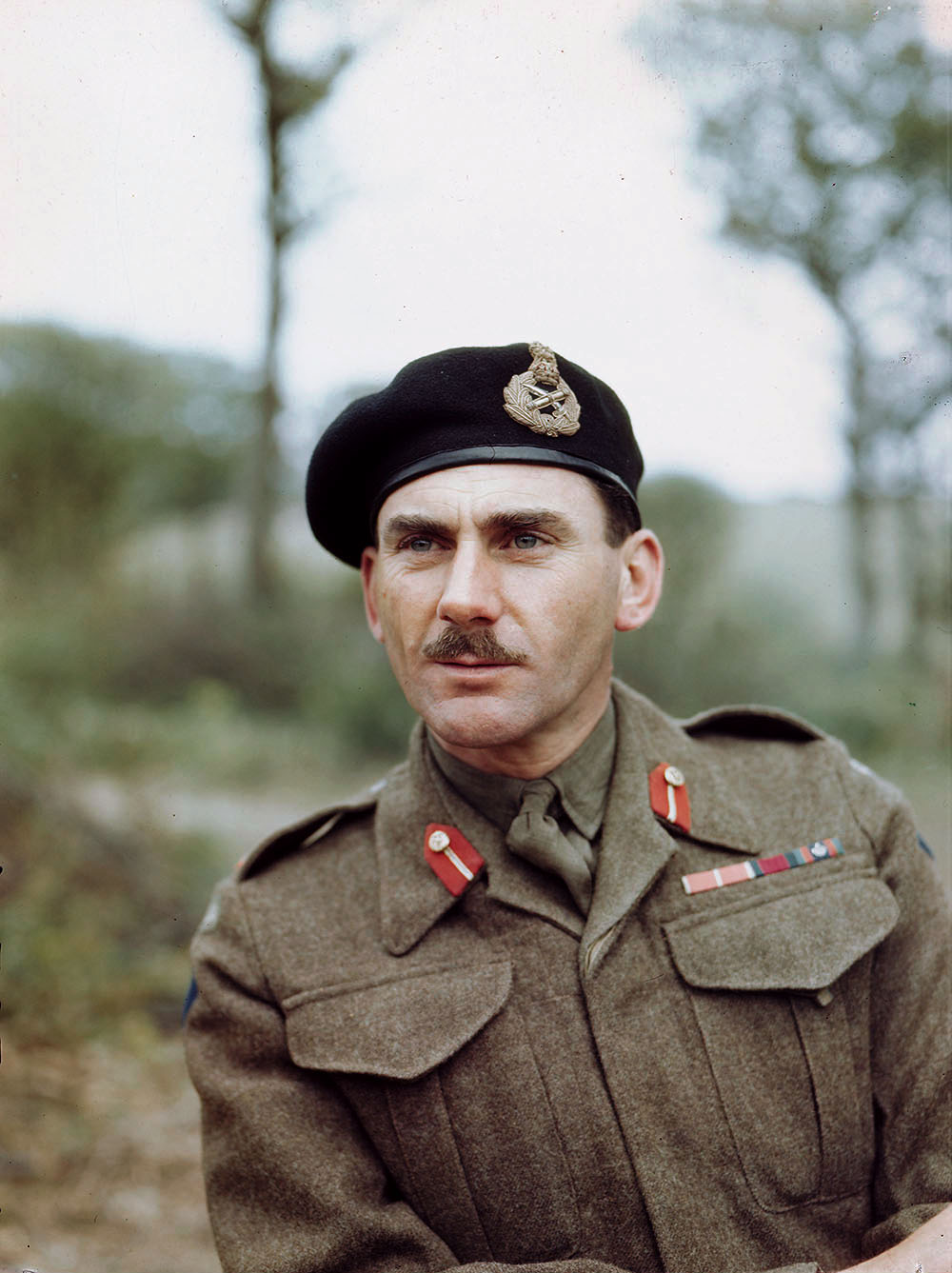
The Commander of First Canadian Army, Lieutenant-General Guy Simonds

From September, Ramsay was deeply involved in planning the assault on Walcheren peninsula. He appointed Captain Tony Pugsley of the Royal Navy, who landed the 7th Brigade of the 3rd Canadian Division on D-Day, to the First Canadian Army headquarters to start preparations.

After previously ordering the Channel ports to be cleared first, Montgomery decided the importance of Antwerp was such that the capture of Dunkirk could be delayed. The First Canadian Army, under temporary command of Lieutenant-General Guy Simonds, was supplemented by the British I Corps, 2nd Canadian Infantry Division, and II Canadian Corps, with the Polish 1st Armoured Division, British 49th and 52nd Divisions attached. Additionally the 51st (Highland) Infantry Division was to give up its transport to enable the movement of forces into battle positions. Montgomery promised the support of RAF Bomber Command in attacking the German fortifications and that of the USAAF 8th Air Force "on the day concerned".

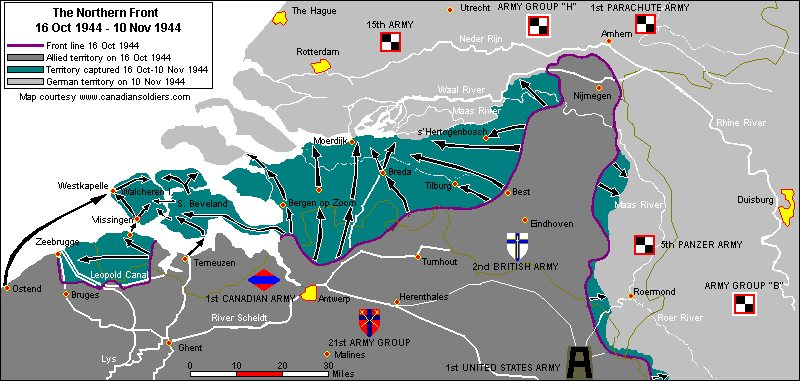
The Northern Front from 16 October to 10 November

The plan for opening the Scheldt Estuary involved four main operations, conducted over daunting geography:

- Clearing the area north of Antwerp and securing access to the South Beveland peninsula.
- Operation Switchback, clearing the Breskens Pocket north of the Leopold canal and south of the Western Scheldt.
- Operation Vitality, the capture of the South Beveland peninsula, north of the Scheldt and east of Walcheren peninsula.
- Operation Infatuate, the capture of Walcheren.

The first attacks occurred on 13 September. After an attempt by the 4th Canadian Armoured Division to storm the Leopold Canal on its own had ended in bloody repulse, Simonds, commanding the II Canadian Corps, ordered a halt to operations in the Scheldt until the French channel ports had been taken, reporting the Scheldt would need more than one division to clear. The halt allowed the German 15th Army ample time to dig in to its new home by the banks of the Scheldt.

Operation Switchback commenced on 21 September when the 4th Canadian (Armoured) Division moved north roughly along the line of the Ghent–Terneuzen Canal, given the task of clearing an area on the south shore of the Scheldt around the Dutch town of Breskens, called the "Breskens pocket". The Polish 1st Armoured Division simultaneously pushed for the Dutch-Belgian border further east and the crucial area north of Antwerp.

The Canadian 4th Armoured Division advanced from a hard-won bridgehead over the Ghent-Bruges Canal at Moerbrugge to find themselves the first Allied troops facing the formidable obstacle of the double line of the Leopold and Schipdonk Canals. An attack was mounted in the vicinity of Moerkerke, crossing the canals and establishing a bridgehead before counter-attacks forced a withdrawal with heavy casualties.

The 1st Polish Armoured Division enjoyed greater success to the east as it advanced northeast from Ghent. In country unsuitable for armour, and against stiffening resistance, the division advanced to the coast by 20 September, occupying Terneuzen and clearing the south bank of the Scheldt east toward Antwerp.

It became apparent to Simonds that any further gains in the Scheldt would come at heavy cost, as the Breskens pocket, extending from Zeebrugge to the Braakman Inlet and inland to the Leopold Canal, was strongly held by the enemy.

In October, Montgomery detached the British 51st Highland Division, 1st Polish Division, British 49th (West Riding) Division and 2nd Canadian Armoured Brigade from the First Canadian Army so they could help the 2nd British Army to take part in Operation Pheasant, an offensive to liberate North Brabant and expand the Arnhem salient. Simonds saw the Scheldt campaign as a test of his ability, a challenge to be overcome, and he felt he could clear the Scheldt with only three divisions of the 2nd Corps despite having to take on the entire 15th Army, which held strongly fortified positions in a landscape that favoured the defensive. Simonds never registered complaints about his lack of manpower, ammunition, and air support.

== Battle ==
=== Securing access to South Beveland ===
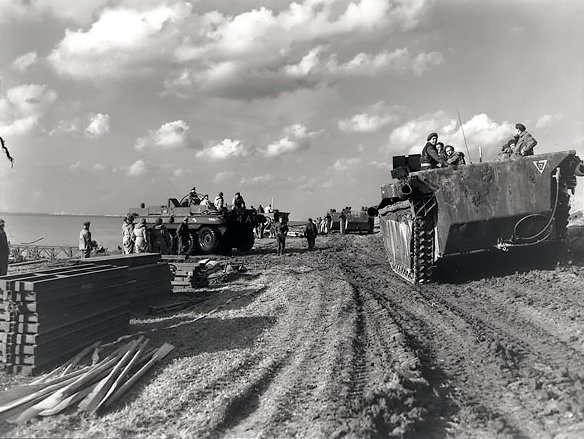
Column of Alligator amphibious vehicles passing Terrapin amphibious vehicles on the Scheldt river, October 1944

On 2 October, the Canadian 2nd Division began its advance north from Antwerp. Stiff fighting ensued on 6 October at Woensdrecht, the objective of the first phase. The Germans, reinforced by Battle Group Chill, saw the priority in holding there, controlling direct access to South Beveland and Walcheren island.

There were heavy casualties as the Canadians attacked over open, flooded land. Canadian historians Terry Copp and Robert Vogel wrote: "the very name Woensdrecht sends shivers down the spines of veterans of the 2nd Canadian Infantry Division". Driving rain, booby traps and land mines made advance very difficult. Attacking on 7 October in heavy mist, the Calgary Highlanders came under heavy fire from German positions. As described in its war diary, "the battle thickened...the Germans forces...hit back with a pugnacity which had not been encountered in the enemy for a long time". The Régiment de Maisonneuve was halted 910 m (1,000 yd) from their target while the next day, the Black Watch of Canada was stopped in its attempt. On 9 October, the Germans counter-attacked and pushed the Canadians back. The war diary of the 85th Infantry Division reported that they were "making very slow progress" in face of tenacious Canadian resistance.

Back at SHAEF headquarters, Ramsay, who was more concerned about the problems facing the Canadians than their own generals, complained to Supreme Allied Commander General Dwight Eisenhower that the Canadians were having to ration ammunition as Montgomery made holding the Arnhem salient his main priority. After Ramsay raised the issue with Eisenhower, the latter informed Montgomery on or about 9 October "the supreme importance of Antwerp. It is reported to me this morning by the Navy that the Canadian Army will not repeat not be able to attack until 1 November unless immediately supplied with ammunition." Montgomery replied by writing: "Request you will ask Ramsay from me by what authority he makes wild statements to you concerning my operations about which he can know nothing repeat nothing...there is no repeat no shortage of ammunition...The operations are receiving my personal attention".

Field Marshal Walter Model, who was commanding Army Group B, ordered: "The corridor to Walcheren will be kept open at any price; if necessary, it will be regained by forces ruthlessly detached from other sectors". Model sent the 256th Volksgrenadier division and assault gun companies to allow the release of Battle Group Chill, the "fire brigade" consisting of 6th Parachute Regiment and assault gun companies. On 10 October, the Royal Regiment of Canada launched a surprise attack against the German lines at Woensdrecht, but for the next days was engaged in heavy fighting against counterattacks from Battle Group Chill. Major-General Charles Foulkes of the 2nd Division sent the Black Watch to support the Royal Regiment. The German forces at Woensdrecht greatly outnumbered the Canadians and had Model known of this, he might have launched a counter-offensive. Instead he used attrition tactics by making piecemeal counterattacks. During this time, war diaries of the Royal Hamilton Light Infantry noted "many snipers in the houses and hedges" had been encountered while the weather was "cold and wet with high winds. Floods rising again".

Simonds had planned to commit the 4th Division to assist the 3rd Division with clearing the Breskens Pocket, but problems faced by the 2nd Division forced Simonds to start peeling off units from the 4th Division. On 9 October 1944, the 29th Armoured Reconnaissance Regiment (The South Alberta Regiment) was ordered to "protect the right flank of 2 Division and prevent infiltration between 2 Div and 1 Polish Armd. Div". The next day, Simonds ordered Major general Harry Foster of the 4th Division "to send 4 Cnd Armd Bde to the Antwerp area at the rate of one get a day, beginning 11 Oct".

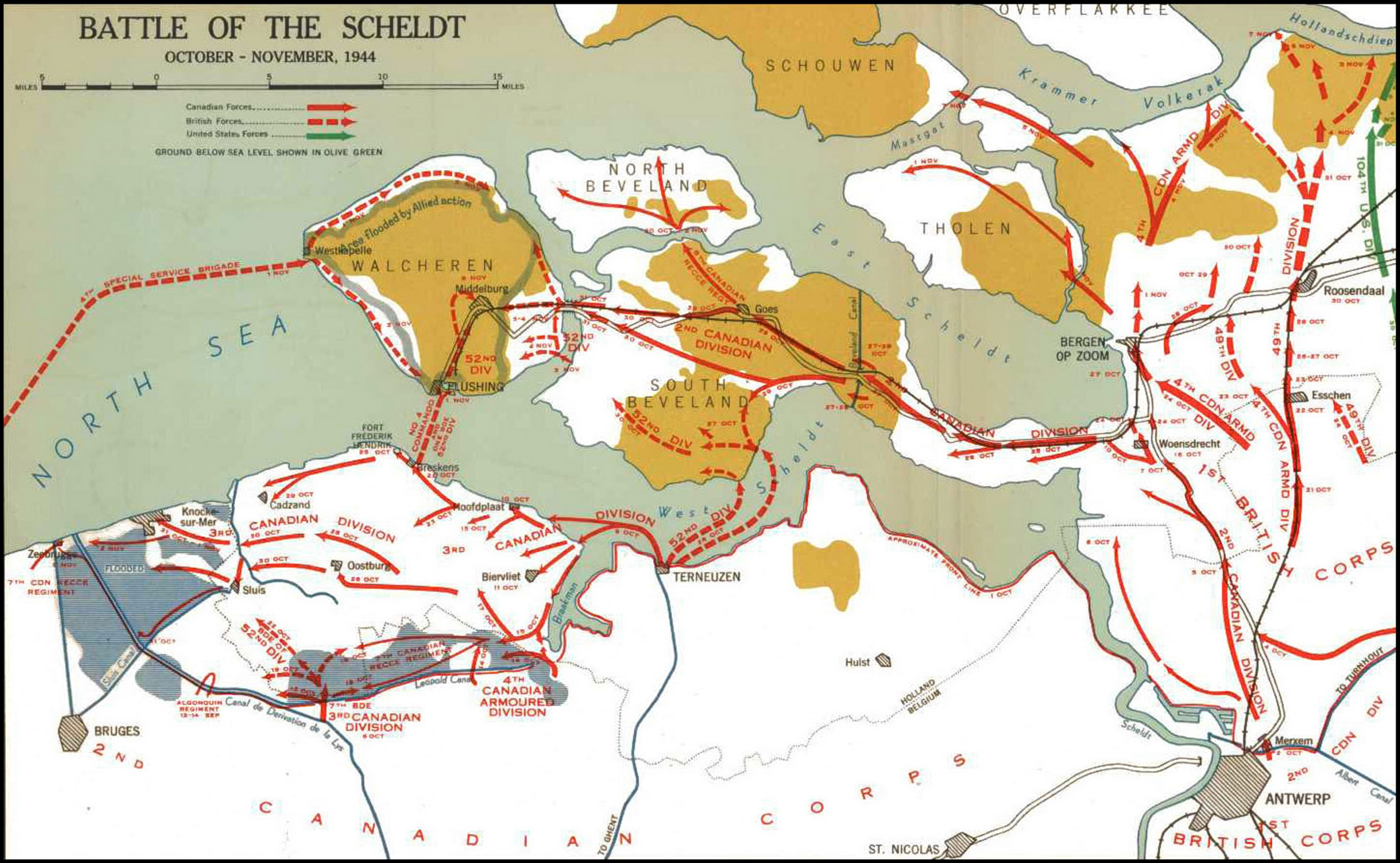
Map of the Battle of the Scheldt

On 13 October, that would come to be known as "Black Friday", the Canadian 5th Infantry Brigade's Black Watch was virtually wiped out in an unsuccessful attack. The Black Watch attacked German positions, already known to be well defended, while the rest of the 2nd Division was not engaged, suggesting that neither Foulkes nor Simonds had taken seriously the problem of fighting by the river Scheldt. The Black Watch, whose officers had come from Montreal's Scottish elite, had billed itself as the most exclusive regiment in the Canadian Army. Despite this reputation, the Black Watch was considered to be a "jinxed" regiment which had had more than its fair share of misfortune. One officer of the Black Watch reported that the soldiers sent to replace the Black Watch men killed and wounded in France "had little or no infantry training, and exhibited poor morale" and that the men of C Company had "all been killed or taken prisoner" during "Black Friday". The Black Watch had already taken very heavy losses at the Battle of Verrières Ridge in July 1944 and its heavy losses on "Black Friday" almost finished the regiment's overseas battalion. The Calgary Highlanders followed up with a more successful action, and their Carrier Platoon succeeded in taking the railway station at Korteven, north of Woensdrecht. (Note: Two kilometres northeast of Woensdrecht) Fighting at Hoogerheide (Note: Two kilometres southeast of Woensdrecht) also ensued. On 16 October, the Royal Hamilton Light Infantry, known as the "Rileys", under the command of Lieutenant Colonel Denis Whitaker, attacked Woensdrecht at night, taking much of the village. However, they were unable to pass beyond the ridge to the west of Woensdrecht. By 16 October, Woensdrecht was secured, cutting the land link to South Beveland and Walcheren. The "Rileys" suffered losses on 16 October equal to those of the Black Watch on "Black Friday". The Canadians achieved their first objective, but had suffered heavy casualties.

On 14 October, Montgomery issued "Notes on Command" that were highly critical of Eisenhower's leadership and asked he be made Land Forces commander again. The next day, Eisenhower replied that the issue was not the command arrangement, but rather the ability and willingness of Montgomery to obey orders, saying he had ordered him to clear the Scheldt and warned if he was unable to obey orders, he would be fired. Stung by Eisenhower's message, a chastised Montgomery promised: "You will hear no more from me on the subject of command...Antwerp top priority in all operations of 21 Army Group". On 16 October, Montgomery issued a directive along that line. To the east, the British Second Army attacked westward to clear the Netherlands south of the Meuse (Maas) during Operation Pheasant, securing the Scheldt region from counter-attacks.

As part of his newly focused efforts to assist Simonds, Montgomery assigned the British 52nd Lowland Division to the First Canadian Army. The 52nd division, recruited in the Lowlands of Scotland, was a mountain division, requiring men with unusual strength and stamina in order to fight in the mountains, making it into something of an elite division within the British Army. Simonds greatly appreciated having the Lowlanders under his command and told Major-General Edmund Hakewill-Smith that the 52nd was to play the decisive role in taking Walcheren island. As such, Simonds ordered Hakewill-Smith to start preparing an amphibious operation as Simonds planned to land the 52nd Division on Walcheren at the same time the Canadians attacked the island.

Meanwhile, Simonds concentrated forces at the neck of the South Beveland peninsula. On 17 October, Foster announced 4th Division would attack on 20 October to take the area known as the Wouwsche Plantage. The offensive began in the early morning of 20 October and was led by the Argyll and Lake Superior regiments. On 22 October, the Lincoln and Welland Regiment, known as the "Lincs" in the Canadian Army, and the Algonquin Regiment took Esschen in a surprise attack. On 23 October, the German 85th Division launched a counterattack led by some self-propelled (SP) guns. The Sherman tanks of the Governor General's Foot Guards and the Lake Superior Regiment were decimated by the German SP guns. For the next days, there occurred what the 85th Division's war diary called "extremely violent fighting". The war diary of the Canadian Argyll and Sutherland Highlanders spoke of "nightmarish fighting" at Wouwsche Plantage. The fighting at Wouwsche Plantage was considered so important that Montgomery arrived at the headquarters of the 4th Canadian Division to press Foster for speed, but Foster protested that the flat polder country made speed impossible. One company of the Lincoln and Welland Regiment lost 50% of its men in a single day's fighting, while an advance company of the Algonquin Regiment was cut off and surrounded by the Wehrmacht, requiring desperate fighting to break out. The Canadians now advanced towards Bergen op Zoom and would take part in Operation Pheasant in an effort to take the city. The advance would force Rundstedt to redeploy the elite 6th Parachute Regiment, which until then had been blocking the 2nd Canadian Division on the Beveland isthmus to the defence of Bergen op Zoom.

By 24 October, Allied lines were pushed out further from the neck of the peninsula, ensuring German counterattacks would not cut off the 2nd Canadian Division, by then moving west along it towards Walcheren island.

=== Operation Switchback ===
The second main operation, Operation Switchback, opened with fierce fighting to reduce the Breskens Pocket. Here, the Canadian 3rd Infantry Division encountered tenacious German resistance as it fought to cross the Leopold Canal. An earlier failed attempt by the Canadian 4th Armoured Division at Moerbrugge had demonstrated the challenge they faced. In addition to the formidable German defences on both the Leopold and Schipdonk Canals, much of the approach area was flooded.

The Breskens pocket was held by the 64th Division commanded by General Knut Eberding, an infantryman with extensive experience on the Eastern Front who was regarded as an expert in defensive warfare. When the 15th Army had retreated from the Pas-de-Calais region of France across the Low Countries in September 1944, an enormous number of guns and ammunition ended up in the Breskens Pocket, including one hundred 20 mm anti-aircraft guns. They were used by the Wehrmacht as a sort of "super-heavy machine gun" and were much dreaded by the Canadian infantry. 20-mm guns could shred a man to pieces within seconds. Besides the 20-mm guns, the 64th Division had 23 of the famous 88 mm flak guns, known for their power to destroy an Allied tank with a single direct hit, together with 455 light machine guns and 97 mortars.

While Montgomery focused on Operation Market Garden in September 1944, Eberding used three weeks of quiet to have his men dig in. He later expressed amazement about the Allied air forces hardly ever bombing the Breskens Pocket in September, allowing his men to build defensive works with barely an effort to stop them. The flat, swampy polder country made the Breskens Pocket into an "island", as much of the ground was impassable with only a few "land bridges" connecting the area to the mainland. The Wehrmacht had blown up dykes to flood much of the ground so that the Canadians could only advance along the raised country roads. Eberding reported that the polder country was "a maze of ditches, canalized rivers and commercial canals, often above the level of the surrounding countryside...which made military man[oeuvre] almost impossible except on the narrow roads built on top of the dykes. Each of these roadways were carefully registered for both artillery and mortar fire".

It was decided that the best place for an assault would be immediately east of where the two canals divided: a narrow strip of dry ground, only a few hundred metres wide at its base beyond the Leopold Canal (described as a long triangle with its base on the Maldegem-Aardenburg road and its apex near the village of Moershoofd some 5 km (3.1 mi) east). Despite the fact that the Ultra intelligence had revealed that the 64th Division was digging in for a hard fight and that Eberding had ordered a fight to the death, Canadian military intelligence seriously underestimated the size of the German forces. They expected Eberding to retreat to Walcheren island once the 3rd Canadian division started to advance. However, Simonds appreciated the problems imposed by the polder country and the Germans concentrating their forces at the few "land bridges". He planned to use amphibious vehicles known as "Buffaloes" to travel across the flooded countryside to outflank the German forces. Simonds planned to strike both at the Leopold canal and at the rear of the Breskens Pocket via an amphibious landing at the Braakman inlet.

A two-pronged assault commenced. The Canadian 3rd Division's 7th Brigade made the initial assault across the Leopold Canal, while the 9th Brigade mounted the amphibious attack from the northern (coastal) side of the pocket. The 7th Brigade was known as the "Western Brigade" in the Canadian Army as its three battalions were all from western Canada with the Canadian Scottish Regiment coming from Victoria area, the Regina Rifles from the Regina area, and the Royal Winnipeg Rifles from the Winnipeg area, while the 9th Brigade was known as the "Highland brigade" as its three battalions were all from Highland regiments with two coming from Ontario and another from Nova Scotia. The North Shore Regiment made a diversionary attack across the Leopold Canal, while the Regina Rifles and the Canadian Scottish made the main assault. The Royal Montreal Regiment, which had never seen action yet, were pressing to get into the fight, and as such, the B Company of the Regina Rifles, nicknamed the "Johns", agreed to step aside so one company of the Royal Montreal Regiment could take their place.

The 9th Highland Brigade, however, was unable to land at the same time as expected, owing to their unfamiliarity with amphibious vehicles. The assault began on 6 October, supported by extensive artillery and Canadian-built Wasp Universal Carriers, equipped with flamethrowers. The 7th Brigade was supposed to be on their own for 40 hours, but instead faced 68 hours of the Germans using everything they had to try the stop the Canadians from crossing the Leopold canal.

Simonds had planned to take the Wehrmacht by surprise by avoiding a preliminary bombardment and instead having the Wasps incinerate the German defenders with a "barrage of flame". The Wasps launched their barrage of flames across the Leopold Canal, allowing the 7th Brigade troops to scramble up over the steep banks and launch their assault boats. However, the Germans had dug in well and many escaped the flamethrowers. One company of the Royal Montreal Regiment was almost destroyed on the edge of the Leopold canal. The Germans brought down heavy machine gun and mortar fire and only a few of the Montrealers made it to the other side. The A Company of the Regina Rifles did not attempt to cross the canal because the volume of machine gun fire convinced the experienced "Johns" that it was too dangerous to try to cross the canal in daylight. The Royal Montreal Regiment company held their precious "bridgehead" for several hours before being joined by the "Johns" three hours later when D Company of the Regina Rifles crossed the canal. They were joined by C and A companies in the evening. By that time, most of the men of B Company of the Royal Montreal Regiment, who had been anxious to get into action, were dead. By contrast, the "barrage of flame" worked as expected for the Canadian Scottish Regiment, who were able to cross the Leopold canal without much opposition and put up a footbridge of kapok fibre within the first hour of crossing the canal.

Two precarious, separate footholds were established, but the enemy recovered from the shock of the flamethrowers and counter-attacked, though the Germans were unable to move the Canadians from their vulnerable bridgeheads. Brigadier J. C. Spraggree became worried that the Regina Rifles might be destroyed by the Germans' ferocious defence, leading him to order his reserve, the Royal Winnipeg Rifles, to cross over the Canadian Scottish Regiment's bridgehead and link up with the Regina Rifles. The polderland, which limited avenues of advance, proved to be a major difficulty as the Germans concentrated their fire along the few raised roads. At the same time, the Regina Rifles came under heavy counterattacks and were barely hanging on. Canadian losses were so heavy that a squadron of tankmen from the 17th Hussars Regiment were given rifles and sent to fight as infantrymen. The Canadian historians Terry Copp and Robert Vogel wrote the fighting "... was at close quarter and of such ferocity that veterans insist that it was worse than the blackest days of Normandy". The war diary of the Royal Winnipeg Rifles reported: "Heavy casualties were suffered by both sides and the ground was littered with both German and Royal Winnipeg Rifle dead". The war diary of the Canadian Scottish Regiment sardonically noted: "The grim fighting was such that PIATs and bazookas were used to blow down walls of houses where resistance was worst. These anti-tank weapons are quite handy little house-breakers!" By 9 October, the gap between the bridgeheads was closed, and by early morning on 12 October a position had been gained across the Aardenburg road.

The days of 10–12 October were ones of intense struggle while the men of the 7th Brigade with the Royal Winnipeg Rifles took, lost and then retook a group of houses known as Graaf Jan and the Regina Rifles found themselves pinned down by a group of well dug-in pillboxes that seemed to be resilient to artillery. The Germans had ample artillery, together with an immense number of artillery shells, and brought down heavy fire on any Canadian advance. Making the fighting even more difficult was the heavy rain that started the day after the crossing of the Leopold canal, with a post-operation report on Operation Switchback stating: "In places the bridgehead was little bigger than the northern canal bank. Even protection was slight: slit trenches rapidly filled with water and had to be dug out many times a day".

The Canadians could not advance beyond their bridgehead on the Leopold canal, but Eberding, not content with stopping the Canadians, decided to "annihilate" the 7th Brigade by launching a series of counter-attacks that cost the German 64th Division dearly, as Canadian artillerymen were killing German infantrymen as proficiently as German artillerymen were killing Canadians. Simonds' plan failed when the 9th Brigade did not land at the same time as the 7th Brigade crossed the Leopold Canal and the 64th Division decisively stopped the advance of the 7th Brigade. In the end, only Eberding's determination to wipe out the 7th Brigade allowed Simonds' plan to work. In terms of numbers lost as a percentage of those engaged, the battle of the Leopold Canal was one of the bloodiest battles for Canada in World War II, with 533 killed and another 70 men breaking down due to battle exhaustion. Copp and Vogel wrote: "One in every two men who crossed the Leopold became a casualty!" The men who broke down under battle curled up in a fetal position and refused to move, speak, eat or drink as their spirits had been broken by the stress of the fighting. On 14 October, Eberding, a man deeply committed to National Socialism, ordered that German soldiers who retreated without orders were to be regarded as deserters and summarily executed, and "... where the names of deserters are ascertained their names will be made known to the civilian population at home and their next of kin will be looked upon as enemies of the German people".

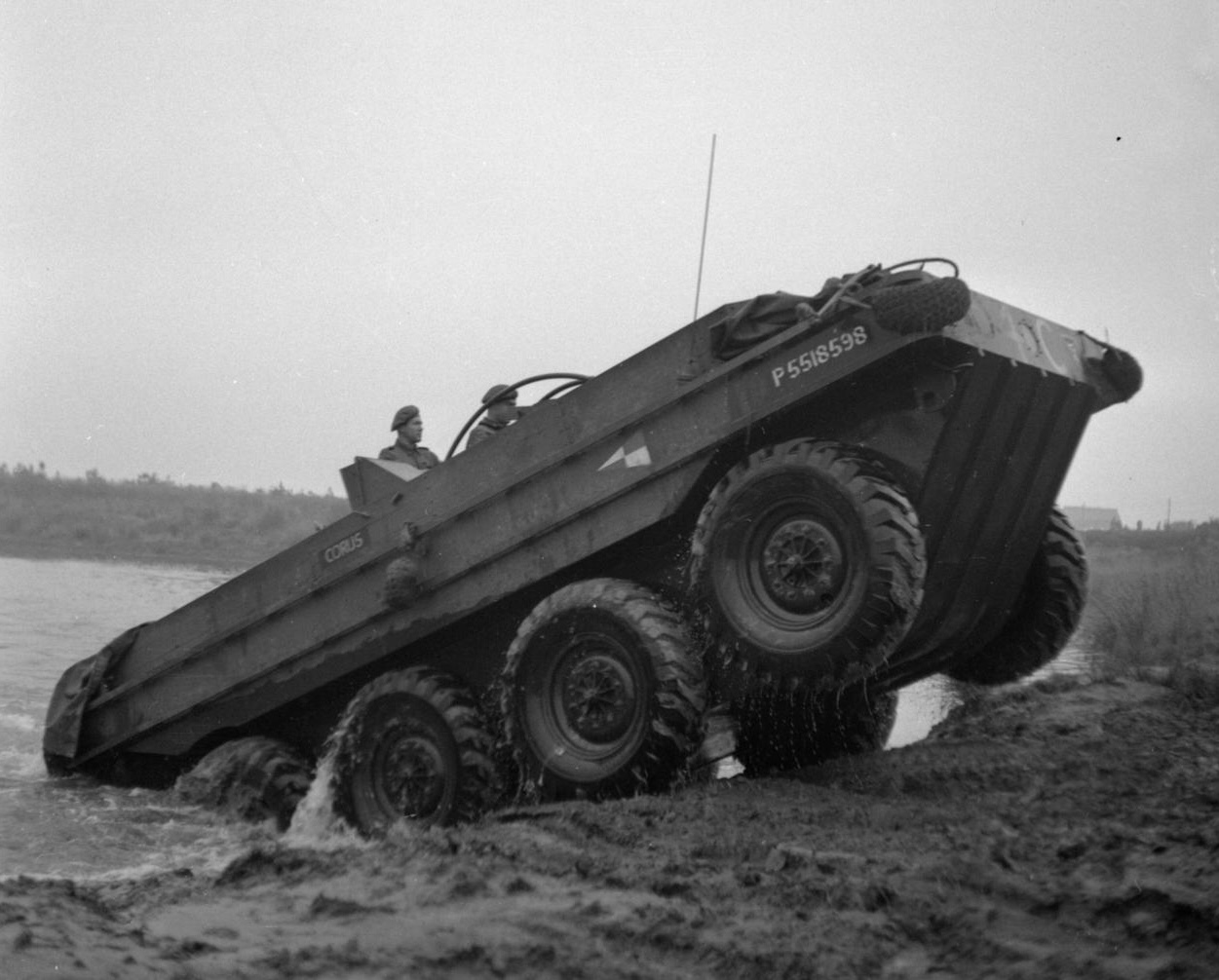
A Terrapin amphibious vehicle undergoing trials.

The Canadian 9th Brigade conducted an amphibious operation with the aid of Terrapin (the first use of the vehicle in Europe) and Buffalo amphibious vehicles, crewed by the British 5th Assault Regiment of the Royal Engineers. The brigade planned to cross the mouth of the Braakman Inlet in these vehicles and to land in the vicinity of Hoofdplaat, a tiny hamlet in the rear or coastal side of the pocket, thus exerting pressure from two directions at once. An "after action" report described the scene on the Terneuzen Canal: "As darkness fell only tail lights showed. The locks at Sas Van Gent proved difficult to negotiate, for the Buffaloes were not easily steered when moving slowly. Their aeroplane engines created a sound so like the roar of aircraft that over Flushing the anti-aircraft guns fired sporadically...Because of the damage to the locks near the ferry (at Neuzen) it was necessary to cut ramps in the bank and by-pass the obstacle. Not only was this a slow progress, but many craft were damaged. The decision was therefore taken to postpone the operation for 24 hours". The delay allowed for Ramsay to volunteer the services of Lieutenant-Commander R.D. Franks of the Royal Navy to serve as a pilot, guiding the Buffaloes expertly down the river Scheldt without the Germans noticing. Franks reported: "It was nearly ideal night, calm and quiet with a half moon behind a light cloud, but a bit of haze which restricted visibility to 1.6 km (1 mi) at most. We were quite invisible from the north shore of the Scheldt, where all was quiet [...] Our touchdown was planned to be on either side of a groyne...we were able to identify it and then lie off flicking our lamps to guide the LVT's in. They deployed and thundered past us...I could see through my binoculars the infantry disembark on dry land and move off".

In spite of difficulties in manoeuvring vehicles through the canals and the resulting 24-hour delay, the Germans were taken by surprise and a bridgehead was established. The North Nova Scotia Highlanders landed with no resistance and woke nine sleeping German soldiers at their dug-out, taking them prisoner. The Highland Light Infantry's major problem at the landing site was not the Wehrmacht, but mud. After the initial landing, the Cameron Highlanders and the Stormont, Dundas and Glengarry Highlanders were landed by Franks. Once again, the Germans recovered quickly and counter-attacked with ferocity; however, they were slowly forced back. Upon hearing of the landing at the Braakman Inlet, Model reacted promptly, telling Hitler: "Today, the enemy launched a decision-seeking attack on the Breskens bridgehead". Living up to his reputation as the "Führer's Fireman", Model ordered Eberding to immediately "annihilate" the Highland Brigade.

Starting at daybreak on 10 October, the Highland Brigade came under counter-attack, with the Stormont, Dundas and Glengarry Highlanders, known as the "Glens" in the Canadian Army, spending two days fighting for the village of Hoofdplaat with a loss of 17 dead and 44 wounded. The North Nova Scotia Highlanders took three days to take the village of Driewegen, with the regimental war diary reporting: "The artillery is kept busy and this dyke to dyke fighting is very different to what we have been doing. It appears the enemy are a much better type than we have been running into lately". The Canadian Army was known for the quality of its artillery, which took a heavy toll on the German counter-attacks by day, with the war diary of 15th Field Regiment for 12 October reading: "Today we were the busiest we have been since Cormelles and Falaise pocket days". The Germans' nightly attacks enjoyed more success, with the Highland Light Infantry losing and then retaking the village of Biervliet during a confusing night battle. Canadian Major-General Daniel Spry of the 3rd Division changed the original plan to commit the 8th Brigade in support of the 7th Brigade, and instead sent the 8th Brigade to link up with the 4th Division and then come to the support of the 9th Brigade.

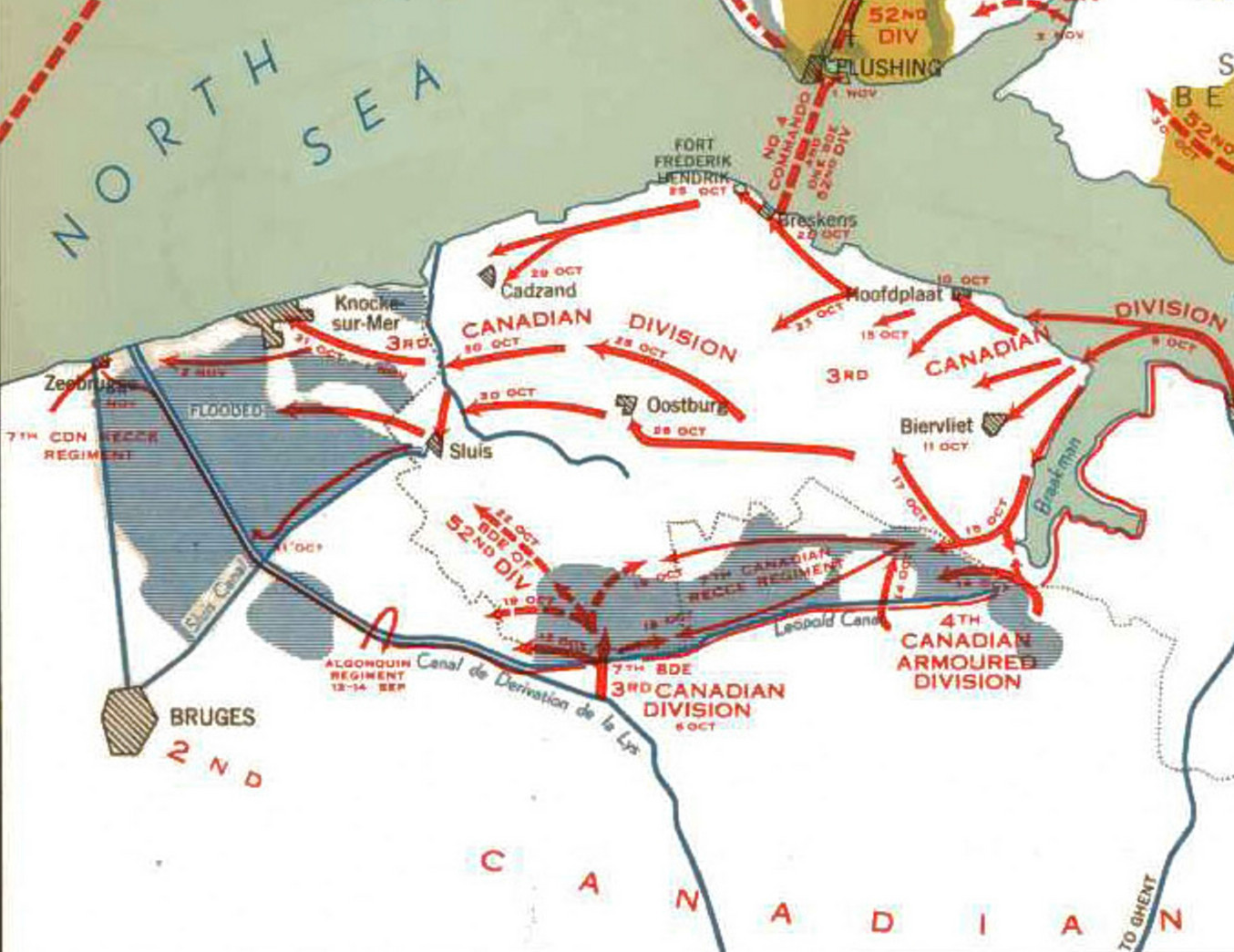
Map of the Breskens Pocket

The Canadian 10th Brigade of the 4th Armoured Division crossed the Leopold Canal and advanced at Isabella Polder. Then the 3rd Division's 8th Brigade was called to move south from the coastal side of the pocket. This opened up a land-based supply route into the pocket. Eberding used his reserves in his counter-attacks and reported to the Oberkommando der Wehrmacht that some units of the 64th Division had "been reduced to one third". Between 10 and 15 October, the 64th Division staged a "fighting retreat", as Eberding called it, to a new pocket designed to shorten his lines, since so many of his units were now under-strength. The Canadian Scottish Regiment found the village of Eede empty and abandoned, entered the village and promptly came under heavy artillery bombardment. The Queen's Own Rifles, leading the advance of the 8th Brigade, found the village of IJzendijke "well defended" on 15 October, but abandoned the next day. The Highland Light Infantry and the "Glens" broke through the main German line, but General Spry, unaware of this, ordered a withdrawal, in order to concentrate greater forces.

The German officers explained away their retreat by claiming they were being overwhelmed by tanks, but in fact there were only four, belonging to the British Columbia Regiment, operating north of the Leopold canal. The presumed tanks were actually the M10 self-propelled anti-tank guns of the 3rd Canadian Anti-Tank Regiment which provided fire support to the Canadian infantry. Joining the Canadians on 20 October were the 157th Highland Light Infantry Brigade of the 52nd Division, which allowed Spry to group the three brigades of the 3rd Division for the final push.

From the summer of 1944 the Canadian Army experienced a major shortage of infantrymen, owing to policies of Prime Minister William Lyon Mackenzie King. In order to defeat Maurice Duplessis, the Union Nationale premier of Quebec who called a snap election in 1939 to seek a mandate to oppose the war, Mackenzie King had promised that only volunteers would be sent to fight overseas and that there would be no overseas conscription. With only so many Canadians willing to volunteer, especially as infantry, the Canadian Army ran seriously short of infantrymen, as their losses were not compensated by replacements. In planning the final push, Major General Spry favoured a cautious, methodical approach, emphasizing firepower that was designed to save as many of the lives of his men as possible.

The 3rd Division fought additional actions to clear German troops from the towns of Breskens, Oostburg, Zuidzande and Cadzand, as well as the coastal fortress Fort Frederik Hendrik. When advancing, the Canadians proceeded very slowly and used massive firepower via air strikes and artillery bombardments when faced with opposition. The shortage of infantry replacements meant that Canadian officers were loath to engage in operations that might lead to heavy losses. On 24 October, Montgomery arrived at the headquarters of the 3rd Division. Despite the fact that Montgomery had chosen to fight the Battle of Arnhem instead of clearing the Scheldt in September 1944, thus having allowed the Germans to dig in, he criticized the 3rd Canadian Division for its slow advance, saying the Breskens Pocket should have been cleared weeks ago and calling the Canadian officers cowards for their unwillingness to take heavy losses. As a result, the 157th Brigade was withdrawn as a punishment and the 3rd Division was ordered to press on with "all speed".

Despite the fact that the Canadians could not afford heavy losses, the 3rd Division began a period of "intense combat" to clear out the Breskens Pocket. The Régiment de la Chaudière attacked the town of Oostburg on 24 October, losing an entire company, but since they had been ordered to take Oostburg at "any price", the "Chads" dug in to hold their ground while the Queen's Own Rifles came to their aid. On 25 October, the Queen's Own Rifles took Oostburg after what its war diary called "a wild bayonet charge" amid "fairly heavy" casualties. Lieutenant Boos of A Company of the Queen's Own Rifles was awarded the Military Cross for leading what should have been a suicidal bayonet charge on the Oostburg town gates but ended with him and his men taking the gates. Despite tenacious German opposition, inspired at least in part by Eberding's policy of executing soldiers who retreated without orders, the Canadians pushed the Germans back steadily. In the last days of the battle, German morale declined and the number of executions of "deserters" increased as many German soldiers wished to surrender rather than die in what was clearly a lost battle. The Régiment de la Chaudière, which could ill-afford the losses, seized a bridgehead on the Afleidingskanaal van de Lije (Derivation Canal of the Lys), over which the engineers built a bridge.

On 1 November, the North Nova Scotia Highlanders stormed a pillbox and captured Eberding, who, despite his own orders to fight to the death for the Führer, surrendered without firing a shot. After being taken prisoner, Eberding met Spry and accused him of not being aggressive enough in taking advantage of "opportunities", saying any German general would have moved far more swiftly. Spry responded that having lost about 700 men killed in two "aggressive" operations within five days, he preferred a methodical advance that preserved the lives of his men. Eberding replied that this showed "weakness" on the side of the Canadians, noting that Wehrmacht generals were only concerned with winning and never let concern with casualties interfere with the pursuit of victory.

Operation Switchback ended on 3 November, when the Canadian 1st Army liberated the Belgian towns of Knokke and Zeebrugge, officially closing the Breskens Pocket and eliminating all German forces south of the Scheldt. (Note: Montgomery also bestowed the nickname "Water Rats" on the 3rd Canadian Infantry Division, a play on the Desert Rats title the 7th Armoured Division had earned in the Western Desert. General Harry Crerar reportedly hated the term, though it was meant as a tribute to their success in amphibious operations in Normandy and the Scheldt. (Granatstein, Jack. The Generals: Canadian Senior Commanders in the Second World War.))

=== Operation Vitality ===
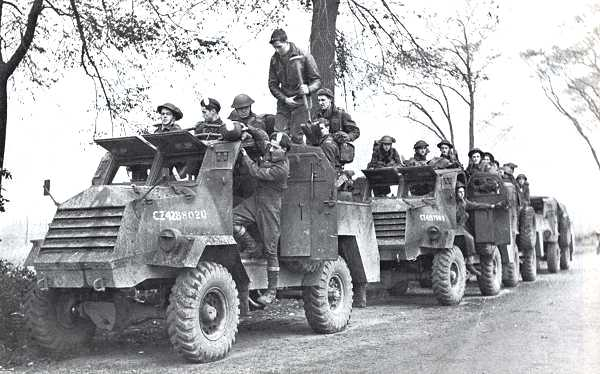
Troops of the Royal Hamilton Light Infantry, (2nd Canadian Infantry Division), in C15TA trucks move towards South Beveland during the Battle of the Scheldt

On the afternoon of 22 October, Major-General Foulkes, as acting commander of the II Canadian Corps told the 2nd Canadian Division that the start of Operation Vitality, the operation to take the South Beveland peninsula, had been pushed forward by two days by the "express orders from Field Marshal Montgomery who had placed this operation at first priority for the British and Canadian forces in this area". Major Ross Ellis of the Calgary Highlanders told Foulkes that the men were tired after the hard fighting earlier in October, only to be informed that the operation would go through. Morale in the 2nd Division was poor, with only the Royal Regiment of Canada, the Essex Scottish Regiment, the Cameron Highlanders and the Calgary Highlanders being able to assemble anything close to four rifle companies. The attack was to be led by the 6th Brigade consisting of the Cameron Highlanders, the battered South Saskatchewan Regiment and the even more battered Fusiliers Mont-Royal, who despite being very under-strength were assigned to lead the attack on the centre. This third major operation opened on 24 October, when the 2nd Canadian Infantry Division began its advance down the South Beveland peninsula. The Canadians hoped to advance rapidly, bypassing opposition and seizing bridgeheads over the Kanaal door Zuid-Beveland (Canal through South Beveland), but they too were slowed by mines, mud and strong enemy defences.

The war diary of the Fusiliers Mont-Royal reports simply that the regiment had taken "heavy casualties", the Cameron Highlanders reported "stiff opposition" from the 6th Parachute Regiment, while the South Saskatchewan Regiment reported: "The country over which we had come was not the kind you dream about to make an attack in as it was partly wooded, partly open, and it had many buildings, ditches, etc". Joining the 6th Brigade later that day were the 5th Brigade, with the Calgary Highlanders leading the assault and reporting the "remnants" of two platoons that had advanced beyond the dyke to be joined by the Black Watch when night fell. The Royal Regiment had seized its start-line during the night and in the early morning was joined by the Essex Scottish Regiment and the Fort Garry Horse Regiment to make a slow advance supported by heavy artillery fire. On 25 October, the Essex Scottish Regiment reported that 120 Germans had surrendered and that the "tough shell of defences at the narrowest point of the peninsula was broken". On 26 October, the 70th Infantry Division's commander General Wilhelm Daser reported to Rundstedt that the situation was untenable, and that retreat was unavoidable.

An amphibious attack was made across the Western Scheldt by the British 52nd (Lowland) Division to get in behind the German's Canal through South Beveland defensive positions. The 156th West Scottish Brigade described the Dutch countryside as "extremely difficult", but also noted that German morale was poor, stating that they had expected the Wehrmacht to fight harder and that most of their casualties were coming from mines and booby-traps. With the formidable German defence outflanked, the Canadian 6th Infantry Brigade began a frontal attack in assault boats. The engineers were able to bridge the canal on the main road.

With the canal line gone, the German defence crumbled and South Beveland was cleared. The third phase of the Battle of the Scheldt was now complete. Daser ordered his men to retreat and make a stand on "Fortress Walcheren".

=== Operation Infatuate ===
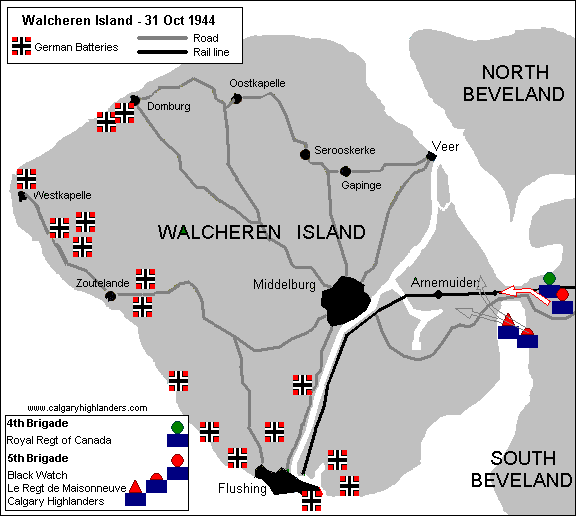
Map of troops at Walcheren Island

As the fourth phase of the battle opened, only the island of Walcheren at the mouth of the Scheldt remained in German hands. The island's defences were extremely strong: heavy coastal batteries on the western and southern coasts defended both the island and the western Scheldt Estuary, and the coastline had been strongly fortified against amphibious assaults. Furthermore, a landward-facing defensive perimeter had been built around the town of Flushing (Dutch: Vlissingen) to defend its port facilities, should an Allied landing on Walcheren succeed. The only land approach was the Sloedam, a long, narrow causeway from South Beveland, little more than a raised two-lane road. To complicate matters, the flats that surrounded this causeway were too saturated with sea water for movement on foot, but had too little water for an assault in storm boats.

==== Inundation of Walcheren ====
To hamper German defence, Walcheren island's dykes were breached by attacks from RAF Bomber Command. Due to the high risks for the local population, the bombings were sanctioned at the highest level and preceded by leafleting to warn the island's inhabitants. The first bombing was on 3 October at Westkapelle, on the western shore of the island. The Westkapelle dyke was attacked by 240 heavy bombers, resulting in a large gap that allowed the seawater to enter. This flooded the central part of the island, allowing the use of amphibious vehicles and forcing the German defenders onto the high ground surrounding the island and in the towns. The bombing at Westkapelle came with severe loss of life, with 180 civilian deaths resulting from the bombardment and the resulting flooding. Attacks on other dykes had to ensure that the flooding could not be contained. On 7 October, dykes in the south were bombed, west and east of Flushing. Finally, on 11 October, northern dykes at Veere became a target. Bombing against the island defences was hampered by bad weather and requirements for attacks on Germany.

The island was then attacked from three directions: across the Sloedam causeway from the east, across the Scheldt from the south, and by sea from the west.

==== Battle of Walcheren Causeway ====
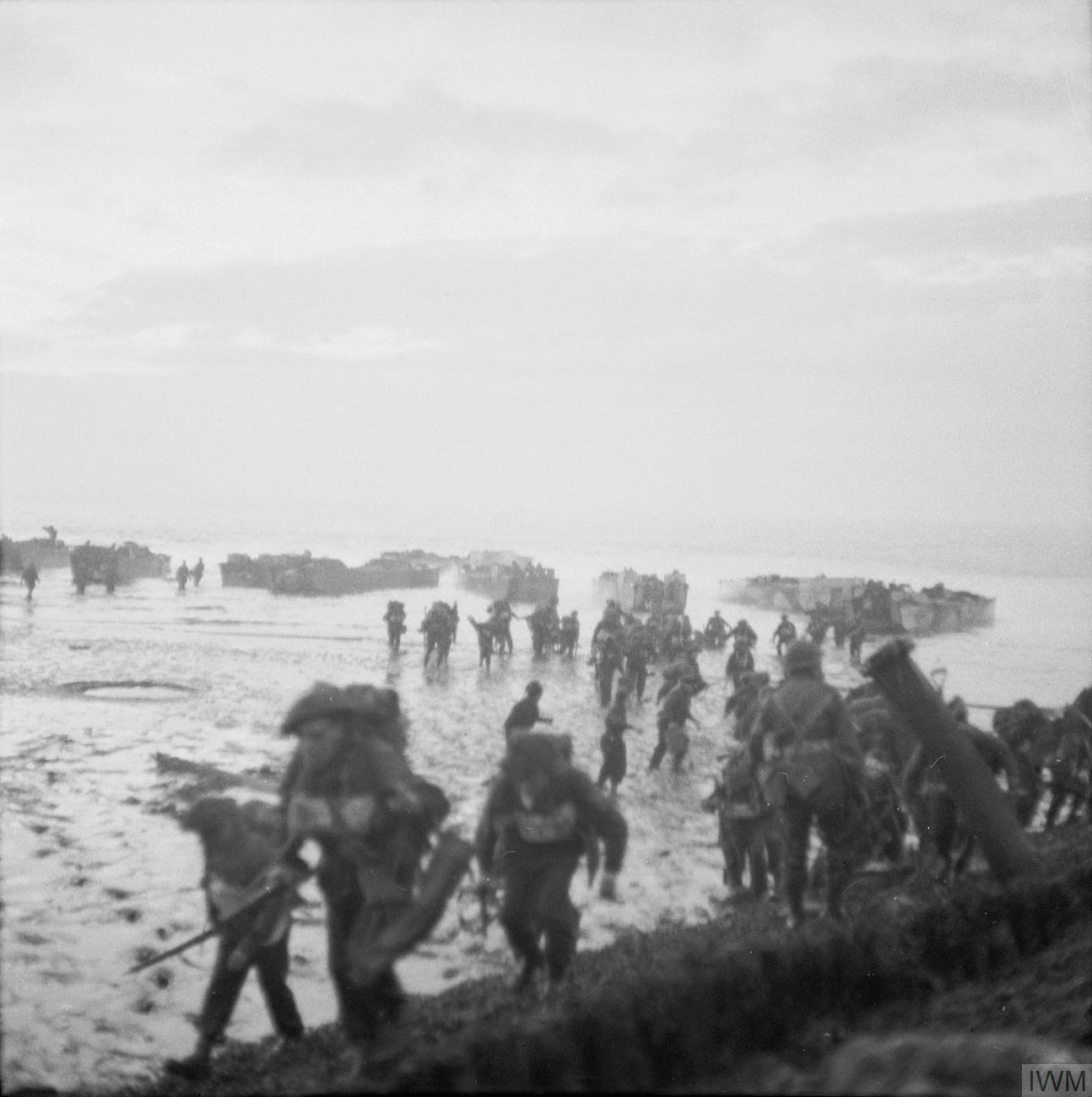
Royal Marines wade ashore near Flushing to complete the occupation of Walcheren on 1 November 1944

The 2nd Canadian Infantry Division attacked the Sloedam causeway on 31 October. Post-war controversy exists around the claim that there was a "race" within the 2nd Division for the first regiment to take the causeway to Walcheren island, implying that the failure to take the causeway on 31 October was due to reckless determination to win the "race". Colonel C.P. Stacey wrote about the "race" in the official history of the Canadian Army, a charge that was vehemently disputed by Copp and Vogel in the Maple Leaf Route.

The 4th Brigade of the 2nd Division had advanced rapidly up to the causeway, which led to Brigadier Keefler giving orders to take the causeway while the task of taking the Beveland end of the causeway had been given to the 52nd Division. The Royal Regiment took the eastern end of the causeway in a night attack. As there seemed an actual chance of taking the entire causeway, orders were sent to the 5th Brigade of the 2nd Division to launch an attack, to be led by the "jinxed" Black Watch who were to advance down the causeway while the Calgary Highlanders and Le Régiment de Maisonneuve were to advance by boat. An initial attack by the Black Watch was rebuffed while it discovered the waters in the channel were too shallow for the 2nd Division to cross it, leaving a company of the Black Watch stranded on the causeway under heavy German attack. The Calgary Highlanders then sent a company over which was also stopped halfway across the causeway. During a second attack on the morning of 1 November, the Highlanders managed to gain a precarious foothold. A day of fighting followed and then the Highlanders were relieved by the Régiment de Maisonneuve, who struggled to maintain the bridgehead. The Régiment de Maisonneuve finally did secure the bridgehead, only to find that it was useless for an advance, since the German defences in the polderland were too entrenched for an advance to be made.

Foulkes ordered Major-General Hakewill-Smith to launch the 52nd Division into a frontal attack on Walcheren, which Hakewill-Smith protested strongly. The "Maisies" withdrew onto the Causeway on 2 November, to be relieved by the 1st Battalion, Glasgow Highlanders of the 52nd Division. Instead of launching a frontal attack as ordered by Foulkes, Hakewill-Smith outflanked the Germans by landing the Cameronian regiment at the village of Nieuwdorp, 3.2 km (2 mi) south of the causeway, and linked up with the Glasgow Highlanders the next day. In conjunction with the waterborne attacks, the 52nd continued the advance. The battle for the causeway had caused the 2nd Division 135 dead in what has become one of the most controversial operations of the 2nd Division, with much criticism centering on the decisions of Foulkes. Despite the fact that Lieutenant-General Simonds and Foulkes were both British immigrants to Canada, the two detested one another and Simonds often spoke of his wish to sack Foulkes, believing him to be incompetent.

Because of port shortage, Captain Pugsley of the Royal Navy had to improvise heavily to provide the necessary shipping for the landings on Walcheren island. Despite the refusal of Bomber Command to strike various German fortifications on Walcheren, opening up the Scheldt was regarded as so important that during a meeting on 31 October between Simonds, Foulkes, and Admiral Ramsay, it was decided that the landings on Walcheren were to go ahead. Pugsley, aboard the command ship HMS Kingsmill, was given the final decision, with orders to cancel the operation if he thought it was too risky. At the same time, Simonds ordered two Canadian artillery regiments to concentrate 300 guns on the mainland, to provide fire support for the landings. The amphibious landings were conducted in two parts on 1 November.

==== Operation Infatuate I ====
Operation Infatuate I consisted mainly of infantry of the 155th Infantry Brigade (4th and 5th battalions King's Own Scottish Borderers, 7th/9th battalion, Royal Scots) and No. 4 Commando, who were ferried across from Breskens in small landing craft to an assault beach in the south-eastern area of Flushing, codenamed "Uncle" Beach. With the Canadian artillery opening fire, the 4th Commando were carried ashore in twenty Landing Craft Assaults, to be followed by the King's Own Scottish Borderers, who attacked Flushing. During the next few days, they engaged in heavy street fighting against the German defenders, destroying much of Flushing. The Hotel Britannia, which before the war had catered to British tourists, was the headquarters of the German 1019th Regiment holding Flushing and became the scene of "spectacular fighting" described as "worthy of an action film" when the Royal Scots engaged to take the hotel, which finally fell after three days.

==== Operation Infatuate II ====
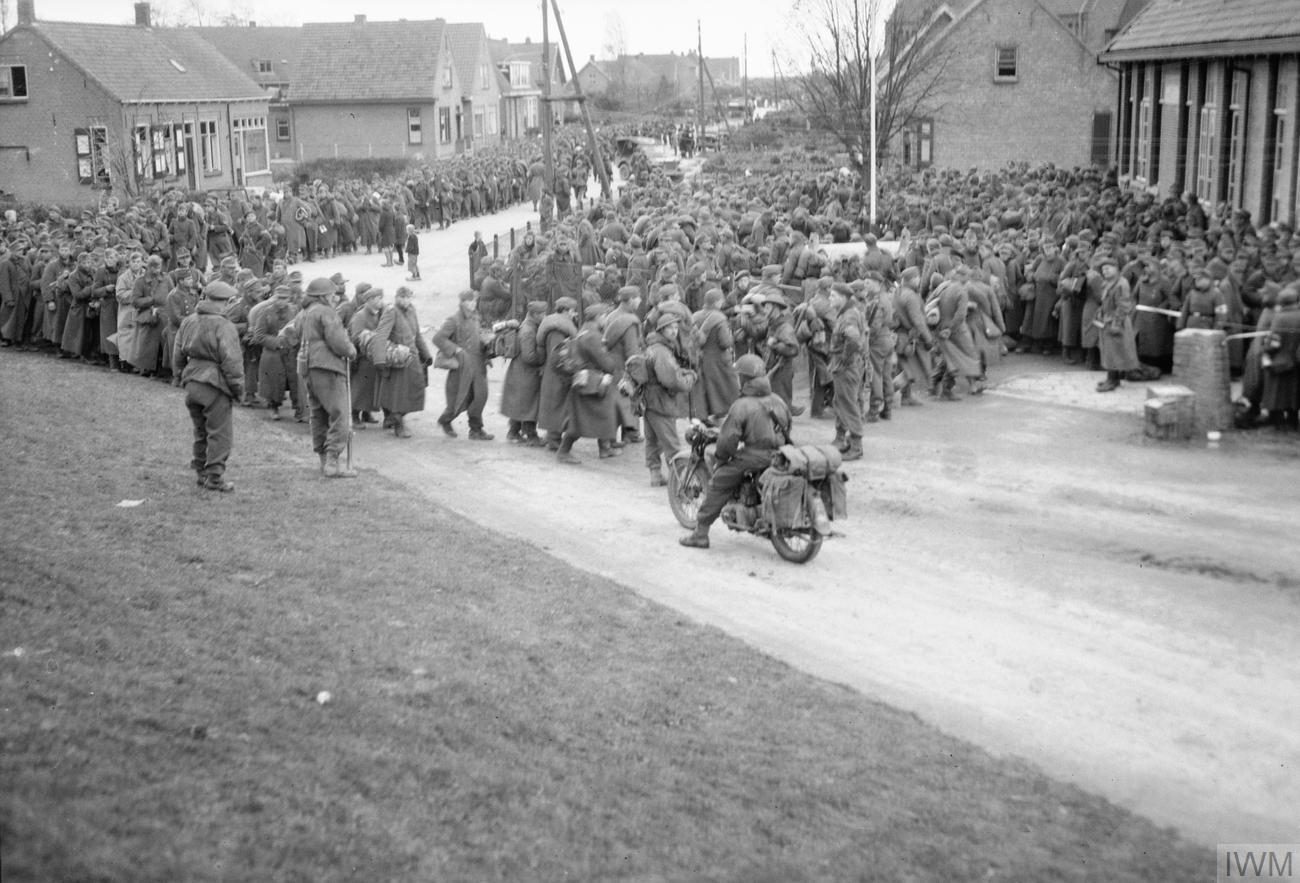
German prisoners being marched off on Walcheren

Operation Infatuate II was the amphibious landing at Westkapelle, also conducted on the morning of 1 November. To cross the shallow water required a daylight assault with fire support provided by the Support Squadron Eastern Flank (SSEF) commanded by Commander K.A Sellar, with additional support from the battleship HMS Warspite and two monitors, HMS Erebus and HMS Roberts. (Note: Between them providing ten 15-inch guns) Air support was limited due to weather conditions. With no air support, no spotter aircraft to guide the guns of his ships, and the Germans fully alerted with their coastal artillery already firing at the British ships, Pugsley was faced with the difficult decision to cancel or proceed, and after some deliberation, sent out the message reading "Nelson", which was the code name to land. The radar-guided guns of the German coastal artillery took a heavy toll on the SSEF, which lost 9 ships sunk and another 11 that were so badly damaged that they had to be broken up for scrap as they were beyond repair. After a heavy bombardment by the Royal Navy, plus a support squadron of landing craft carrying guns, troops of 4th Special Service Brigade (Nos. 41, 47, and 48 Royal Marines Commando and No. 10 Inter Allied Commando, consisting mainly of Belgian and Norwegian troops) supported by the specialized armoured vehicles (amphibious transports, mine-clearing tanks, bulldozers, etc.) of the 79th Armoured Division were landed on both sides of the gap in the sea dyke, using large landing craft as well as amphibious vehicles to bring men and tanks ashore. The Royal Marines took Westkapelle and Domburg the next day. Anticipating the fall of "Fortress Walcheren", on November 4, Admiral Ramsay ordered that mine-sweepers start the work of removing the German mines from the river Scheldt, a task that was not completed until 28 November.

Heavy fighting ensued in Domburg as well before the ruins of the town were captured. On 3 November, the Royal Marines had linked with the 52nd Division. Part of the troops moved south-east toward Flushing, while the main force went north-east to clear the northern half of Walcheren (in both cases along the high-lying dune areas, as the center of the island was flooded) and link up with the Canadian troops who had established a bridgehead on the eastern part of the island. Fierce resistance was again offered by some of the German troops defending this area, so that fighting continued until 7 November.

On 6 November, the island capital Middelburg fell after a calculated gamble on the Allies' part when the Royal Scots attacked Middelburg with a force of amphibious "Buffaloes" from the rear. Since Middelburg was impossible to reach with tanks, due to the inundations, a force of "Buffaloes" were driven into the town, forcing an end to all German resistance on 8 November. General Daser portrayed the "Buffaloes" as tanks, giving him an excuse to surrender as he was faced with an overwhelming force.

Meanwhile, the Canadian 4th Armoured Division had pushed eastward past Bergen-op-Zoom to Sint Philipsland where it sank several German vessels in Zijpe harbour.

With the approach to Antwerp clear, the fourth phase of the Battle of the Scheldt was complete. Between 20 and 28 November, Royal Navy minesweepers were brought in to clear the Scheldt Estuary of naval mines and other underwater obstacles left by the Germans. On 28 November, after much-needed repairs of the port facilities, the first convoy entered Antwerp, led by the Canadian-built freighter Fort Cataraqui. A ceremony was held to commemorate the occasion, with delegates from Britain and US in attendance, though no representative for the Canadian Army was invited.

== Aftermath ==
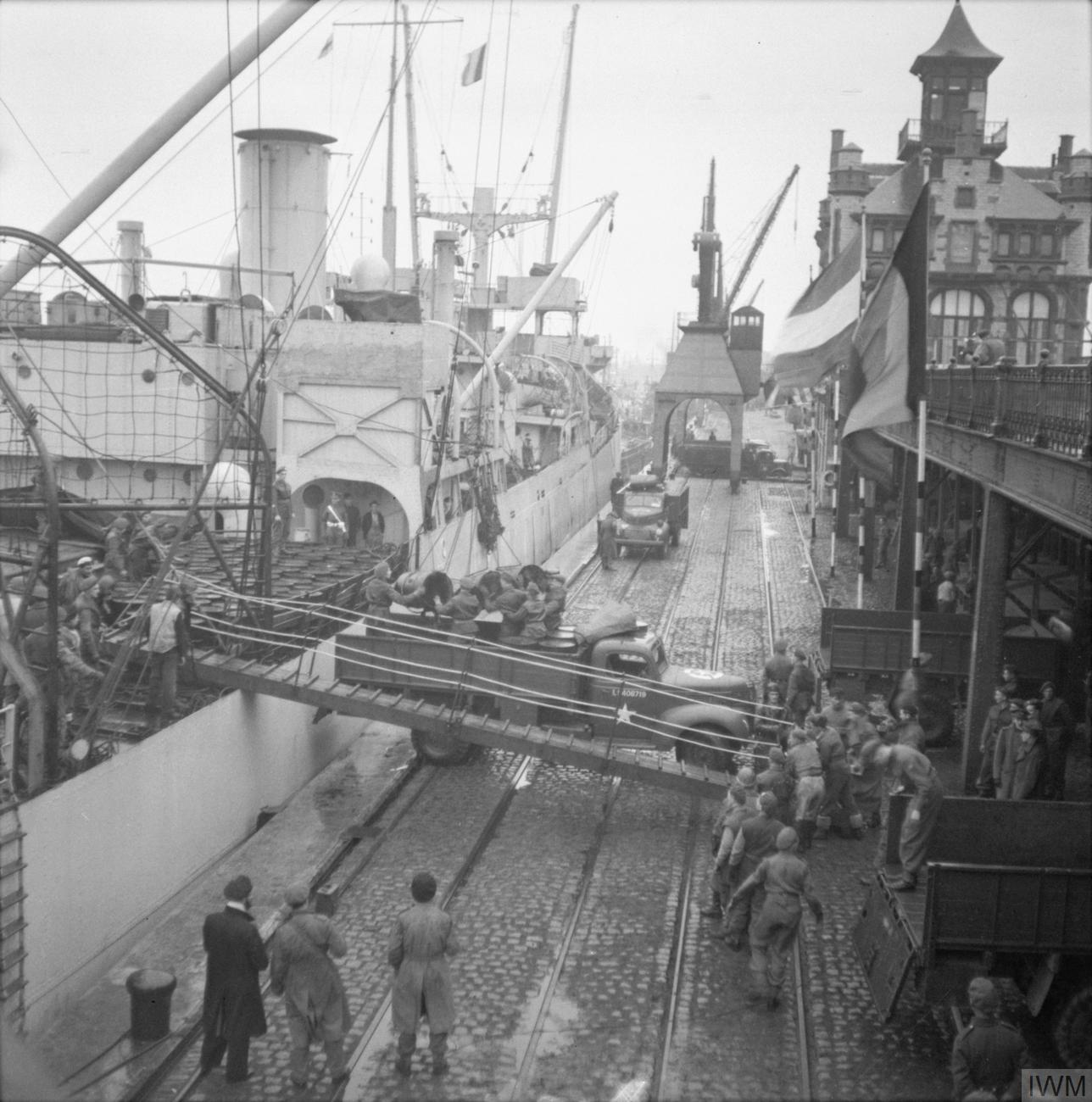
Canadian vessel SS Fort Cataraqui unloads oil at the harbour of Antwerp

At the end of the five-week offensive, the Canadian First Army had taken 41,043 German prisoners. Complicated by the waterlogged terrain, the Battle of the Scheldt proved to be a challenging campaign in which significant losses were suffered by the Canadians.

Throughout the Battle of the Scheldt, battle exhaustion was a major problem for the Canadians. The 3rd Canadian Division had landed on D-Day on 6 June 1944 and more or less fought continuously since then. A psychiatric report from October 1944 stated that 90% of battle exhaustion cases were men who had been in action for three months or longer. Men suffering from battle exhaustion would go catatonic and curl up in fetal position, but the report found that after a week of rest, most men would recover enough to speak and move about. According to the report, the principal cause of battle exhaustion "seemed to be futility. The men claimed there was nothing to which to look forward to – no rest, no leave, no enjoyment, no normal life and no escape....The second most prominent cause...seemed to be the insecurity in battle because the condition of the battlefield did not allow for average cover. The third was the fact that they were seeing too much continual death and destruction, loss of friends, etc". The Canadian government policy of sending only volunteers overseas had caused major shortages of men, especially in the infantry battalions. Canadian units were too under-strength to allow leave, where U.S. and British units could. This stretched the soldiers tremendously. A common complaint of soldiers suffering from battle exhaustion was that the Army was trying to "get blood from a stone", with the under-strength units being pushed relentlessly to keep fighting, without replacements for their losses and no chance to rest.

After the battle, the II Canadian Corps moved to the Nijmegen sector to take over from the XXX British Corps. Although Antwerp was opened to Allied shipping on 28 November, the German 15th Army had delayed the use of Antwerp to the Allies from 4 September to 28 November 1944, which was longer than Hitler had hoped for, justifying the German decision to hold the river Scheldt. Even before the Battle of the Scheldt, the Canadian Army was aware that it lacked reinforcements to replace its losses, and the losses endured during the fighting help provoke the Conscription Crisis. The Canadian Defence Minister, Colonel John Ralston, was forced to report to the prime minister, William Lyon Mackenzie King, that the current policy of only sending volunteers overseas was not sustainable as the losses in the Battle of the Scheldt vastly exceeded the number of volunteers, and conscripts would have to be sent overseas. Copp and Vogel strongly praised Simonds's leadership of the First Canadian Army, writing how his operations "were brilliantly planned and sometimes brilliantly executed". Copp and Vogel also defended the Canadians from charges of incompetence and cowardice made by US and British historians stating: "The Canadian Army had, through October, the most difficult and important task of all the Allied armies, it had carried through a series of complex operations to a successful conclusion and it had done this with verve and skill despite the growing manpower shortage now apparent on all the Allied fronts."

After the first ship reached Antwerp on 28 November, convoys started bringing a steady stream of supplies to the continent, but this actually changed very little. Operation Queen continued to flounder, while the US then suffered a major reverse in the Hurtgen forest offensive by December. The dismal fall weather hindered not only the Canadians in the Battle of Scheldt, but also the operations of First U.S. Army in the Hurtgen forest, the Third U.S. Army in Lorraine, and the Ninth U.S. Army, the Seventh U.S. Army and First French Army further south. On 5 November 1944, Eisenhower calculated that for the offensives into the western borderlands of Germany to be successful, over the following month, it would require 6 million artillery shells, two million mortar shells, 400 more tanks, 1,500 jeeps, and 150,000 spare tires to replace worn-out ones, none of which was readily available until the Scheldt was cleared. By 15 December, only the Seventh U.S. Army had reached the Rhine by taking Strasbourg while the U.S. Third Army had advanced into Germany to run up against one of the strongest sections of the West Wall. At least part of the reason for the failure of the Allied offensives was the shortage of infantry replacements, with the US coming close to running out of infantry replacements and the British being forced to break up divisions to provide reinforcements.

Germany recognized the danger of the Allies having a deep water port, and in an attempt to destroy it – or at least disrupt the flow of supplies – the German military fired more V-2 rockets at Antwerp than at any other city. Nearly half of the V-2s launched during the war were aimed at Antwerp. The port of Antwerp was so strategically vital that during the Battle of the Bulge, the last major German offensive campaign on the Western Front, launched on 16 December 1944, the primary German objective was to retake the city and its port. Without Antwerp being opened, which allowed 2.5 million tons of supplies to arrive at that port between November 1944 and April 1945, the Allied advance into Germany in 1945 with the US, British, and French armies heading into the Reich would have been impossible.

=== Controversy ===
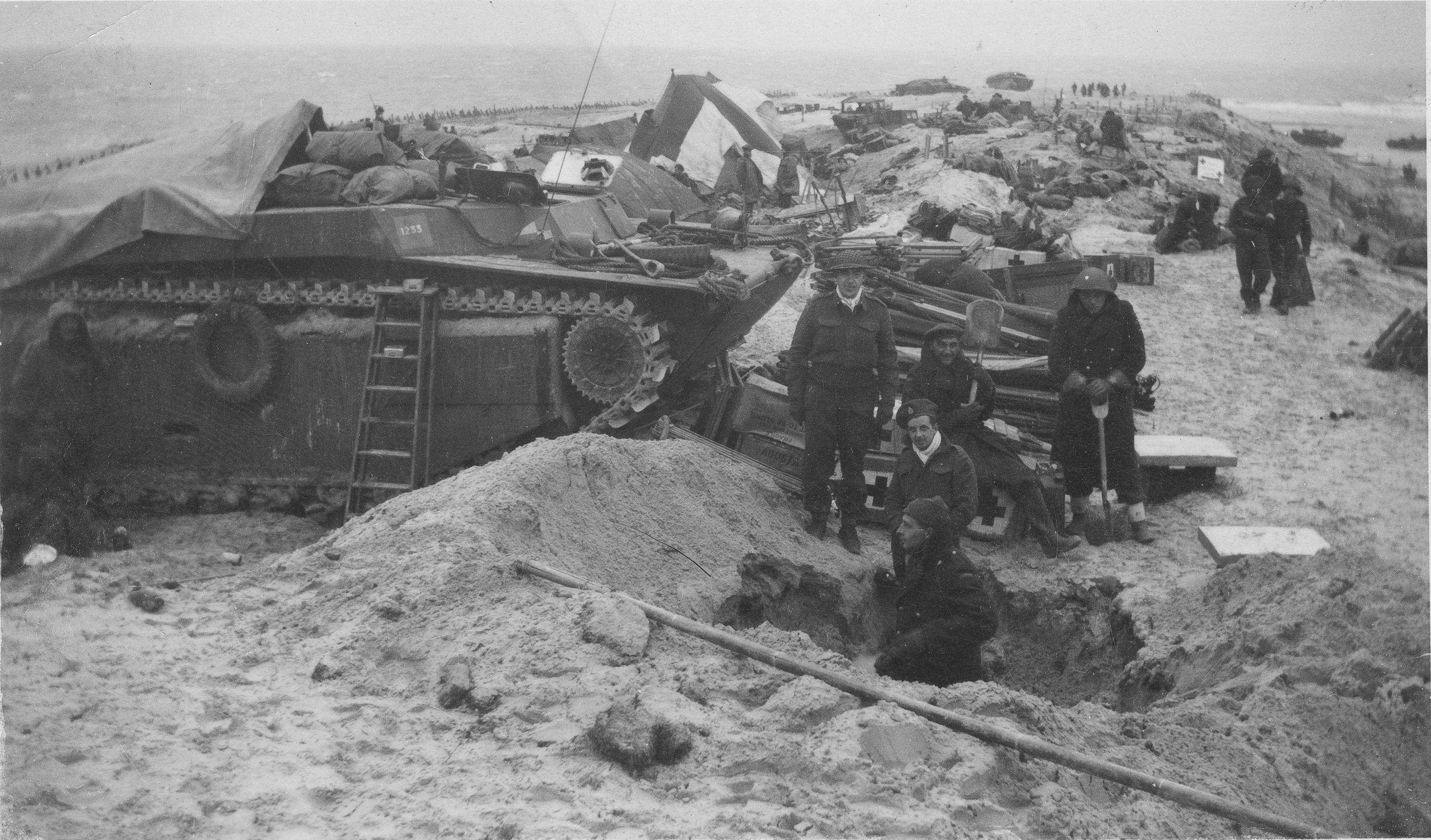
A Canadian field hospital in the dunes at Westkapelle, November 1944

The Battle of the Scheldt has been described by historians as unnecessarily difficult, as it could have been cleared earlier and more easily had the Allies given it a higher priority than Operation Market Garden. US historian Charles B. MacDonald called the failure to immediately take the Scheldt "[o]ne of the greatest tactical mistakes of the war." Because of the flawed strategic choices made by the Allies in early September 1944, the battle became one of the longest and bloodiest that the Canadian army faced over the course of the Second World War.

The French Channel ports were "resolutely defended" like "fortresses" and Antwerp was the only viable alternative. However, Montgomery ignored Admiral Cunningham, who said that Antwerp would be "as much use as Timbuctoo" unless the approaches were cleared, and Ramsay, who warned SHAEF and Montgomery that the Germans could block the Scheldt Estuary with ease.

The Antwerp city and port fell in early September and were secured by XXX Corps under the command of Lieutenant General Brian Horrocks. Montgomery halted XXX Corps for resupply short of the wide Albert Canal to the north of the city, which consequently remained in enemy hands. Horrocks regretted this after the war, believing that his corps might have advanced another 160 km (100 mi) with the fuel available. Unknown to the Allies, at that time XXX Corps was opposed by only a single German division.

The pause allowed the Germans to regroup around the Scheldt River, and by the time the Allies resumed their advance, General Kurt Student's First Parachute Army had arrived and set up strong defensive positions along the opposite side of the Albert Canal and Scheldt river. The task of breaking the strengthened German line, which stretched from Antwerp to the North Sea along the Scheldt River, would fall to the First Canadian Army in the month-long, costly Battle of the Scheldt. The Allies "sustained 12,873 casualties in an operation which could have been achieved at little cost if tackled immediately after the capture of Antwerp. .... This delay was a grave blow to the Allied build-up before winter approached."

The British historian Antony Beevor was of the opinion that Montgomery, not Horrocks was to blame for not clearing the approaches, as Montgomery "was not interested in the estuary and thought that the Canadians could clear it later". Allied commanders were looking ahead to "leaping the Rhine...in virtually one bound." Despite Eisenhower wanting the capture of one major port with its dock facilities intact, Montgomery insisted that the First Canadian Army should clear the German garrisons in Boulogne, Calais and Dunkirk first, although these ports had all suffered demolitions and would not be navigable for some time. Boulogne and Calais were captured on 22 and 29 September 1944; but Dunkirk was not captured until the end of the war on 9 May 1945. When the Canadians eventually stopped their assaults on the northern French ports and started on the Scheldt approaches on 2 October, they found that German resistance was far stronger than they had imagined, as the remnants of the Fifteenth Army had had time to escape and reinforce the island of Walcheren and the South Beveland peninsula.

Winston Churchill claimed in a telegram to Jan Smuts on 9 October that "As regards Arnhem, I think you have got the position a little out of focus. The battle was a decided victory, but the leading division, asking, quite rightly, for more, was given a chop. I have not been afflicted with any feeling of disappointment over this and am glad our commanders are capable of running this kind of risk." He said that the risks "... were justified by the great prize so nearly in our grasp" but acknowledged that "[c]learing the Scheldt Estuary and opening the port of Antwerp had been delayed for the sake of the Arnhem thrust. Thereafter it was given first priority."

== See also ==
- Rifleman Khan
- The Forgotten Battle (2020), a Dutch film about the Battle of the Scheldt
