= Battle of Douvres Radar Station =

Part of the Battle of Normandy

- Part of the Normandy Landings
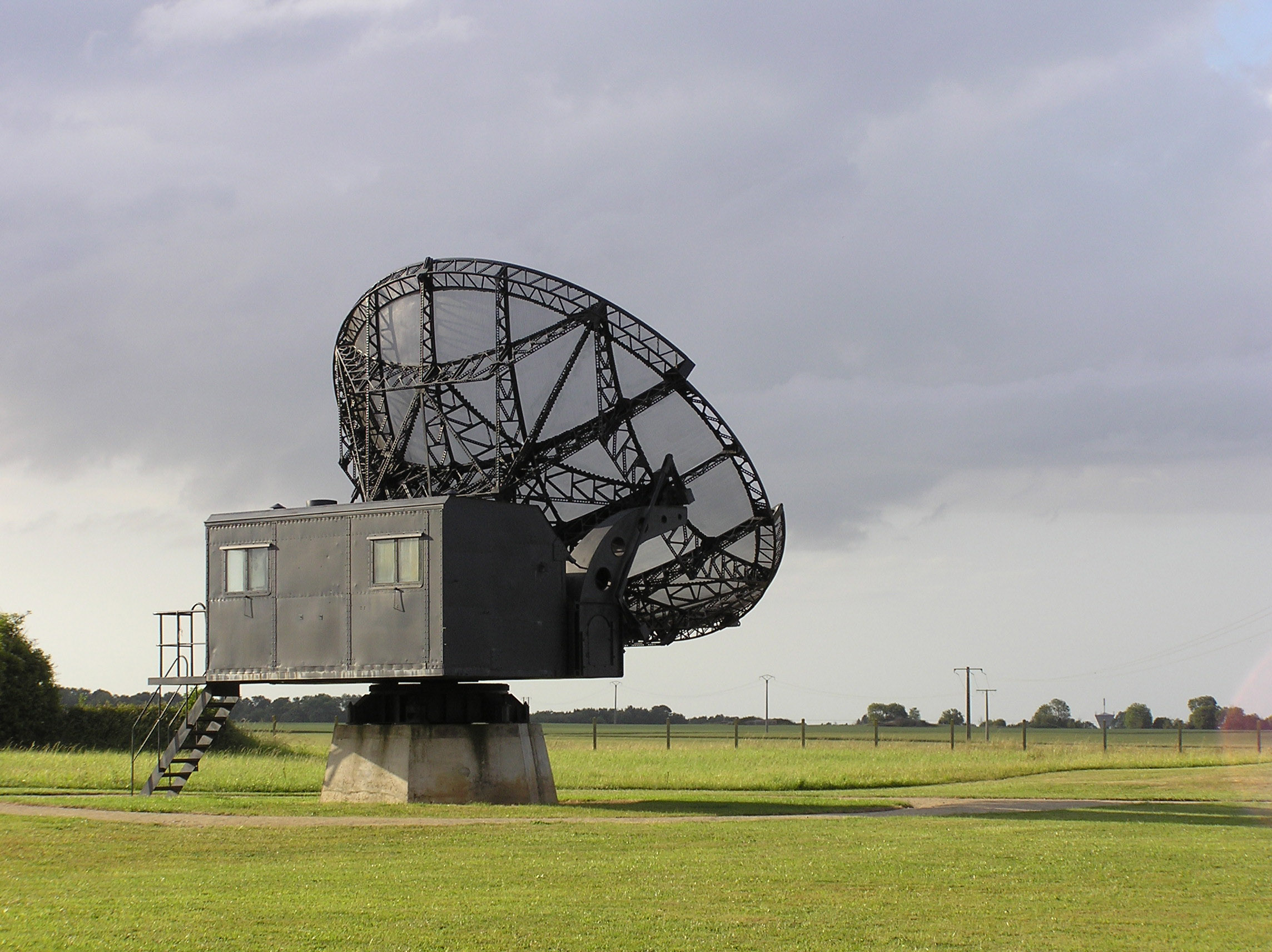
- Würzburg Riese radar at Douvres-la-Délivrande
Date	17 June 1944
Location	near Douvres-la-Délivrande, Normandy, France 49°17′10″N 0°24′11″W
Result	British victory

Belligerents
United Kingdom	Germany

Commanders and leaders
Eric C.E. Palmer	Kurt Egle

Strength
41 Commando; 79th Armoured Division (elements)	Kompanie 8./Ln-Regiment 53./ (LWF); Gren-Regt 736./Bn III. (Kp.11/Kp.12); Panzergrenadier-Regt 192./Bn II. (KGr Rauch) (21st Panzer Division)

Casualties and losses
4 killed, 12 wounded 4 tanks	Many killed, 227 captured,

The Battle of Douvres Radar Station was a military engagement of the invasion of Normandy, that took place on 17 June 1944. The radar had been destroyed on the first day and Allied troops had bypassed the site moving further inland.

British No. 41 (Royal Marine) Commando attacked a German radar station operated by and mostly defended by Luftwaffe ground forces. Supported by an artillery and detachments of specialist mine-clearing and assault tanks of 79th Armoured Division, the defences were breached and the site taken with few casualties on the Allied side.

== Background ==
The Normandy landings, the Allied invasion of German-occupied France had commenced on 6 June 1944. The radar at Douvres-la-Délivrande was the primary Luftwaffe radar station in the area—a fortified position of twenty acres—having been built by the Todt Organisation comprising five radars with thirty concrete works. It had been attacked on numerous occasions prior to the landings.

At 11:00 p.m. on the night of 5/6 June 1944, the Allies launched intensive jamming of radar frequencies which blinded the German radar network along the "Atlantikwall" from Cherbourg to Le Havre. On the morning of 6 June (D-Day) the antennae at Douvres-la-Délivrande were destroyed by Allied naval artillery bombardment.

The 3rd Canadian Infantry Division, which had landed nearby on Juno Beach, isolated the station but the Germans defended it for twelve days, awaiting a counter-attack by 21st Panzer Division; on one occasion it was supplied with food by a nocturnal paradrop mission from Mont-de-Marsan.

== The objective ==
The Douvres site was large, covering about 20 acres (8.1 ha) in two parts, a main site (Hauptstützpunkt I Stp. Douvres I ) and to the north, separated by a road, a secondary site (Stützpunkt II Stp. Douvres II). Both parts were well protected by 20 ft (6.1 m) high barbed wire and minefields with multiple machine guns and anti-tank and anti-aircraft defences with a 7.5 cm field gun and mortars, The majority of the site was underground in concrete bunkers up to four storeys deep.

Vollfestungsmässig Gross Suchstellung 'Diestelfink': ("Luftwaffe night-fighter control centre Douvres") (Note: 49.287406 N 0.40879 W) had five radars operated by 8. Kompanie / II. Abteilung / LuftNachrichten-Regiment 53. Located south of both the Juno (Canadian) and Sword (UK) landing beaches, its nightfighter command station (Nachtjagd JaFü), became operational in August 1943. Covering the Seine Bucht, operators identified aircraft (bomber stream) course, height and speed, and directed Luftwaffe nightfighters to intercept. From the Normandy villages of Douvres and la-Délivrande (Gold Beach), its north approach, was secured by Kompanie 12., Battalion III. of GR 736, and its western approach, from Canadian landings at Tailleville, was defended by Kompanie 11./ Battalion III./ GR 736.

At its primary site were four radars, two Freya FuMG and two Würzburg FuSE, and at its ancillary a single Wasserman sFuMG. About 238 Luftwaffe personnel operated the site, led by Oberleutenant Kurt Egle but it took in German Army soldiers retreating from Tailleville, Douvres, and La Deliverande expanding the garrison. A fully developed standard Stellung / Suchstellung configuration, it consisted of a fortified main site: and a single fortified satellite, operated under a single authority and command, having grown in personnel to battalion strength. The site consisted of standardized technical electronic equipment and operational buildings, combined and laid out following specified distance criteria. The power for the site radar and associated equipment came from diesel generators, housed in underground bunkers. As a Coastal Zone site it was fortified with heavy bunkers (Verstärkt Feltmessig Type 2) for the protection of vital radar functions and personnel, to include a very strong anti-aircraft defence capability, set-out respecting the terrain and potential defence of the site.

- Hauptstützpunkten Stp. Douvres I was located at North 49Deg 17Min 11Sec / West 00Deg 24Min 14Sec, . (Note: Ref. GSGS 4250 1:50K: Creully Sheet 7E/5)
- Hauptstützpunkten Stp. Douvres I integrated an Annex, South of 'la Route de Beny (Note: 49.28432 N 00.40438 W (Ref. GSGS 4250 1:50K: Creully Sheet 7E/5)) controlling the East/West Road access to the Station, and defending its south approach.
- Stützpunkten Stp. Douvres II was located at 49°17′38″N 0°24′17″W defending the north approach to the station.

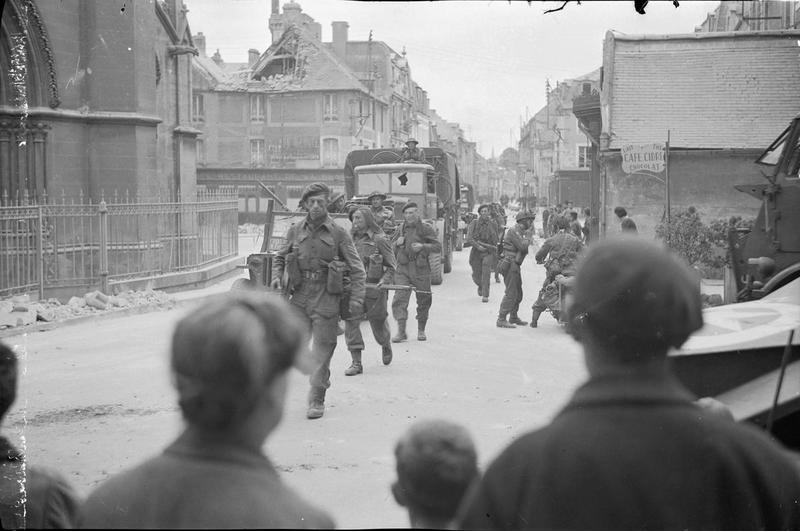
Men of No. 46 (Royal Marine) Commando, entering Douvres-la-Delivrande, 8 June 1944, watched by French civilians.

Hauptstützpunkten Stp. Douvres I was a solid, reinforced company-plus sized fortified position, incorporating multiple concrete Verstärkt Feltmessig LwF Type 2 anti-aircraft Flak gun casemates, with additional Vf observation and Vf crewed fighting positions, it was built to protect the primary radar complex. A well prepared position, sited to the SW of Douvres, with open and clear fields of fire, a 360Deg arc, it was defended by Kompanie 8. /Luftnachrichten-Regiment (Ln.Rgt.) 53. Set out in a fully circular design, the site was additionally 'protected' by a tactical minefield, 13 meters wide, recorded as KV-Gruppe Riva Bella Minefield: Mf.52.

- Stp. Douvres I AA defences
  - Type R622 Doppelunterstand Bunker: Twin Group Bunker 1x 2 cm Flak 38 (Open)
  - x3 Ringstand: 1 x 2 cm Flak 30
  - Luftwaffe Type L414 Schartenstand für 2 cm Flak. (Casemate for 2 cm AA)
- Stp. Douvres I ground defences
  - Schartenstand für 7.5 cm PAK 40 - Ringstand: 1 x 75mm PaK anti-tank gun
  - x3 PAK-Unterstellraum.Ringstand OBW 50mm KwK: 1 x 50mm Kwk L/42 Gun
  - x3 PAK-Unterstellraum.Ringstand: 1 x 50mm PaK L38 Gun
  - Panzerstellung Tobrouk: 37 mm Renault FT 331(f) Turret (H604)
  - x2 Ringstand Tobrouk: Vf.Rs58c heavy machine gun
  - Multiple Understand: Vf Light machine guns (x16)
- Stp. Douvres I had two H622 Understand personnel bunker accommodating 20 men, with another for medical use
  - R661 Unterstand für Verwundetensammelstelle (Sanitätsstände for casualty assembly)
  - Luftwaffe Type L415 FA Wasse Wasservorrats-Unterstand (water reserve storage)
- Air-Defence Weapons and Support Bunkers located at Stp. Douvres I (South)
  - Type (Lwf) L410A Geschutzstand mit Zugbefehlsstelle Command-Bunker: 2x 37mm Flak guns (open roof)
  - x2 Type (Lwf) L409A Geschutzstand Emplacement: 2x 3.7 cm Flak guns
  - Type (Lwf) L413 Understand Bunker: Ammunition Flak Battery 37mm
  - Type (Lwf) FA Unterstand für Munition: Gebaude (Munitionstand für leichte Flakzug)

Stützpunkten Stp. Douvres II was a well reinforced platoon-plus sized position, incorporating concrete Verstärkt Feltmessig Type 2 anti-aircraft gun casemates, with additional observation and fighting positions, it was built to protect the ancillary radar complex, enclosing one radar. A well prepared position on open ground, sited to the west of Douvres, with clear fields of fire over 360 degrees of arc, it was defended by Kompanie 8./Luftnachrichten-Regiment 53. North of its larger command position, it and was set-out in a fully circular design, the site was protected by a tactical minefield, 13 metres wide, recorded as KV-Gruppe Riva Bella Minefield: Mf.100.

- Crew Served Weapons and Support Bunkers at II/ Stp. Douvres
  - x2 Type L409A Geschutzstand Emplacement: 2x 3.7cm FlaK 43 Guns Open Roof
  - Type L410A Geschutzstand mit Zugbefehlsstelle Command-Bunker: 2x 3.7 cm FlaK 43 Guns
  - x4 Ringstand Tobrouk: Vf.Rs58c Heavy MG (schweren Maschinengewehre)
  - L486 Understand Bunker (Permanent Radar Station): FA Generator
  - L486 Permanent Radar Station - Type FA Generator

=== The radars ===
Due to its elevation Douvres was developed as a long-range early-warning radar site in late 1942. It had a Nachtjagd JaFü 'Anton' control centre with a Funkmeßstellung 1. Ordnung consisting initially of two Freyas LZs, one Wassermann, and two Würzburg-Riese. The Freya LZ gave aircraft range and bearings and the Würzburg-Riese confirmed height and range. The later Wassermann, integrating Freya technology, had greater range and increased accuracy in azimuth and elevation. Initially Distelfink operators used their radar data to construct a local Hauptlage ("primary situation picture"), and from February 1944 using additional Flugwachkommando data it produced a composite Luftlage: Aircraft Situation Picture, that it passed to its Jagddivision. Working in a Type L479 Unterstand für Fu.M.G. Auswertung Jafü: Anton, operators used the Anton's 'Seeburg' Plotting Room, centered on a large glass table, with a grid-superimposed map, to create its three dimensional airspace model; an average shift requiring thirty-six staff. The Jagddivision produced a comprehensive (Gross)raumlage: Large Spatial Position Picture and took decisions to launch interceptor forces, controlled through its subordinate Jagdfliegerführer (Jafü) for daylight missions or through its Nachtjagdraumführer (Nachtjagd JaFü) during darkness. Distelfink then reacting as a night aircraft control centre (Nachtjagdraumführer) for its assigned airspace, the decision to launch interceptors having been made. For night fighter aircraft control, Funkmeßgeräte-Auswertung: Nachtjagd JaFü DISTELFINK was integrated with Jagdfliegerführer 5 at Bernay in Eure, la Basse- Normandie, itself subordinate to 5. JägerDiv Fliegerdivisionen (headquartered at Paris: Jouy-en-Josas).

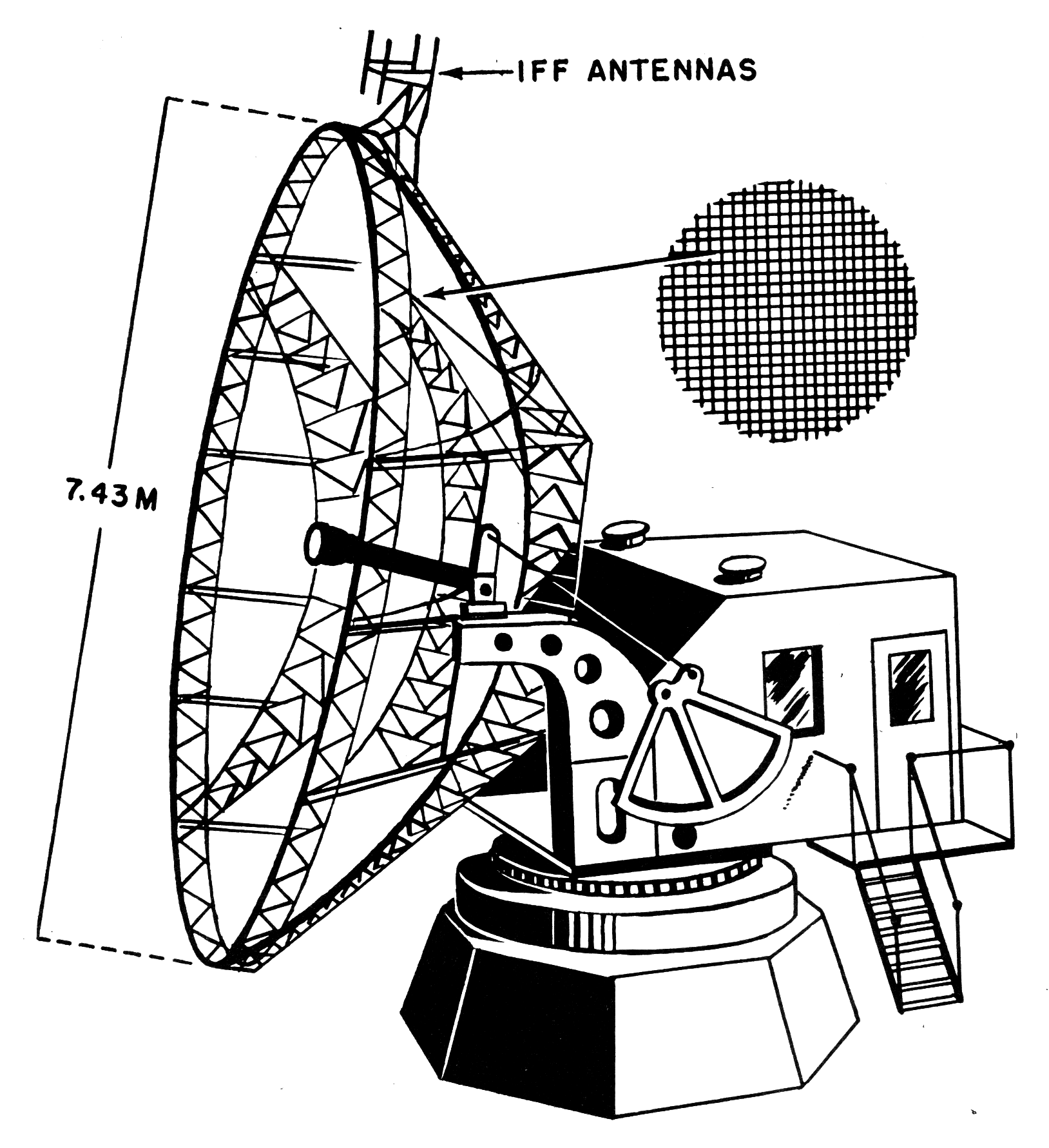
Giant Wurzburg illustration

The Freya LZ detected aircraft range and bearing, at long distances, but it could not determine height. Freya devices were vulnerable to chaff, along with other countermeasures, limiting them to early warning, not controlling intercepts. It was the first operational early-warning radar.

- StP. Douvres I - Freya (Pole) LZ: FuMG 401A (with an increased range up to 200 km). The mass-produced Freya FuSE was replaced by the Freya FuMG (1943) at more permanent stations, those not seeing frequent relocations. The Freya-LZ FuMG 401A differs from other LZ versions in being mounted on a concrete foundation was located and targeted at Lambert Conical (MR 1944) Grid 005802.
- StP. Douvres I - Freya (Pole) LZ FuMG 450 A/N (with increased Range to 120 km). The Freya-LZ FuMG 450 A/N Early Warning: Anti-Aircraft Targeting. Targeted at Lambert Conical (MR 1944) Grid 005802.
- StP. Douvres II - Multiple Freya antenna arrays integrated onto single or twined columns, as a Wassermann. This not only offered greater range, up to 300 km, but also more accurate azimuth (bearing), elevation (height) and range (distance). Towards the end of the war, the FuMG.42 Wassermann WS integrated eight Freya antenna arrays onto two columns, each with four antennae. At StP. Douvres II, a Wassermann Siemens M IV Range: 300 km, (380 km over water) was located and targeted at Lambert Conical (MR 1944) Grid 006809. FuMG 402 Schwer Wassermann Anti-Aircraft Targeting Radar (Chimney: Cylinder 3), with a LwF Type L480 Understand MIV Bunker - Wassermann S FuMG 402 Radar.

Unlike the detector warning Freya, the Würzburg were a tracking radar, the Würzburg FuSE confirming target azimuth and height. The Wurzburg first deployed as an FuMG 39, upgraded as the Wuerzburg-D (FuMG 39 T/D) was one of the most advanced radar used in guiding anti-aircraft artillery. As Luftwaffe designation FuMG 62 Würzburg, it was introduced in 1939/40.

- StP. Douvres I – from the outset housed two Würzburg-Riese FuSE 65. The Wuerzburg-Riese guided interceptors to an incoming/outgoing aircraft stream, the interceptor located the stream either visually or with its Lichtenstein radar. The Würzburg-Riese would operate jointly with a Freya: the Freya picking up targets needed the Würzburg-Riese for exact measurements of location, course and height. The two Würzburg-Riese FuSE65 were mounted on a Type Regelbau V229 Würzburg-Riese Stand / FuM Riese Radar, sited in close proximity; were targeted at Lambert Conical (MR 1944) Grid 008801.

== Defending forces ==
Commanded by an Oberleutnant (senior lieutenant) the station was defended by Luftwaffe personnel of 8. Flugmelde-Leit-Kompanie / Luftnachrichten-Regiment 53 ("air surveillance regiment 53"). They were reinforced during the day of 6 June and the morning of 7 June by soldiers of Battalion III. Grenadier-Regiment 736 (Note: The regiment included an Ost battalion) part of the Infanterie-Division 716 and, in the evening, soldiers from KGr Rauch Battalion I./ Panzer-Grenadier-Regiment. 192 (mot.)

Luft-Nachrichten-Regiment 53., formed in April.1942, consisted of multiple battalions, whose companies manned and operated medium-range detection Freya and short-range interceptor Wurtzburg-Riese.

- II. Abteilung / Ln.Rgt. 53., Gefechtsstand - Lisieux Calvados Department, Normandy.
  - 8. Flugmelde-Leit-Kompanie / II. Abteilung - Douvres: Stellung Diestelfinken was a Tier 1 Stellung The company was assigned to its Stellung (site), operational from mid-1943, employing the Seeburg-Lichtenstein-Verfahren 'method', to model a three-dimensional picture for night air interceptions, based on the integration of the ground component radar data and the tasked aircraft's radar.

Battalion III./ Grenadier-Regiment 736, Feldpost FpNr: 43019 was commanded by Major Pipor. His HQ at Cresserons, was also the Gefechtsstand: KVU-Gr. Luc (KV-Gruppe Riva Bella). A Bodenständigen: static (garrison) battalion it had virtually no transport. Its commander positioned two of his companies, in such a way that he would influence the first two days of the battle of Douvres radar station.

  - Kompanie 11 ( Kdr Hauptmann Hans Gutsche), with Stab-Zug: South of Tailleville, Second in command: Oberleutnant Heinrich Korzilius. Tasked as Battalion III./ Reserve Kp11., was sited Northwest of Douvres, South of Tailleville: Hinzu kommen Positionen in offener Feltmessige Anlage (Fa) in Type 1 Field Trenches, with 12 machine guns and one Kp. Mortar. It would hold up a Canadian attempt to flank the site and attack it from the northwest.

Kompanie 12. with Stab-Zug: la-Délivrande, was sited on the north outskirts of la Délivrande and the western edge of Douvres, it would hold up the British 4th Special .Service Brigade advance down to the radar site. The company manned two "Resistance Nests": WN 22 (la Délivrande. Hohe 18), at Spot Height 18 was in the village, where the road crosses above the old railway line. It was not a strong defensible position, made up of a few reinforced houses and Feltmessige Anlage Type 1 Field Trenches. WN 23a (Douvres.bourg) with no crew served weapon bunkers on the western outskirts, it retains a small (Verstärkt Feltmessig) Vf Type 2 Command Bunker set back into a hedgerow. A trench runs from it to an integrated trench system in the hedgerows, any defensive works would have been Feltmessige Anlage Type 1.

== Initial attacks ==
At 11:00 p.m. on the night of 5/6 June 1944, the Allies launched intensive jamming of radar frequencies which blinded the German radar network from Cherbourg to Le Havre. On the morning of the 6 June the antennae at Douvres-la-Délivrande were destroyed by Allied naval artillery bombardment.

On D-Day the Canadians had paused in their movement south from the Juno beaches, looking for 48 (RM) Commando to move up, secure their left flank, and help to capture the Douvres radar site. Standing central to a rapidly filling western Canadian bridgehead, the Douvres Radar Site was to be captured - on orders by a combined force of The North Shore Regiment and X Troop (Royal Marines) of 30 Assault Unit (which was to seize any useful intelligence or technical equipment from the site). The most strongly defended position, in the Canadian sector, it was not taken on D-Day, its approaches well defended by Kompanie 11./ Battalion III./ Grenadier-Regtiment 736., sited astride the D219 road and in La Bruyere Wood.

Early on 7 June, The North Shore (New Brunswick) Regiment moved south from the Chateau de Tailleville to capture the Douvres radar station, its support limited to direct-support fire from 19th Canadian Army Field Regiment (24 25-pounder guns) and a squadron of Sherman tanks of the Fort Garry Horse. Securing the start-line, 'A' Company having patrolled across its front the night before, quickly ran into an entrenched position, where they took 38 prisoners, opening a route overlooking les Bruyeres. Exiting Tailleville, 'C' Company' moving east of the D219 through broken woods and hedgerows, clearing a honeycomb of trenches, tunnels, and shelters, it moved up to a hilltop overlooking the (North) radar site and Les Terres Noires. Ordered up on the right flank, 'A' Company cleared the west side the D219, fighting hard to get clear of La Bruyere Wood, getting into position above les Parquets to observe the south radar site.

Taking all day without complete success and growing casualty count growing, the North Shores were ordered to clear La Bruyere Wood, move west, and bypass the radar station. With it clear and secure up to Voix les Moulineaux, containment of the Douvres site was entrusted to the Black Watch, 5th Battalion, Royal Regiment of Scotland, the 4th Special Service Brigade, and two AVREs from the 79th Armoured Division. German troops retreating from the Juno and Sword beaches found their way into the station, strengthening an already strong defence. After being rested and reinforced after the initial landings, the 4th Special Service Brigade less No. 41 Commando, moved south to the radar station.

== Assault ==
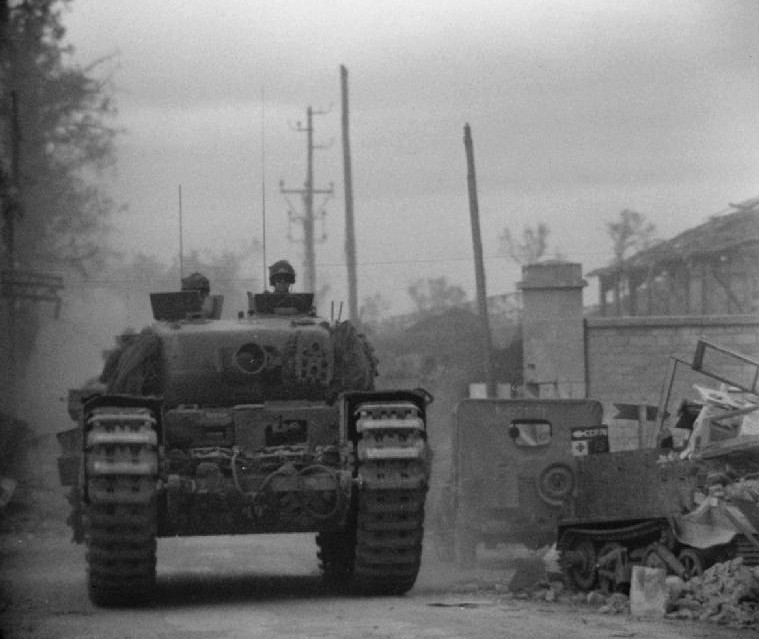
A Churchill AVRE (Caen July 1944)

After securing the perimeter, 46, 47 and 48 Commandos were sent to support the Canadians and 6th Airborne division while 41 Commando stayed behind. For the next week, the strongpoint was harassed with occasional mortar and support weapon fire, attacks by rocket firing Hawker Typhoon fighter bombers and shelling by the howitzers of two Royal Marine Armoured Support Group Centaur tanks. The attention kept the Germans inside their bunkers and from attempting to repair the radar. Although the site did not threaten Allied movements in the area, it provided radar-ranging information for Luftwaffe night fighters and constantly reported on British movements. Commando patrols infiltrated the site boundary

On 14 June the Germans attempted a resupply by air, the supplies parachuted in were taken by the commandos.

On 17 June at 4:30 p.m. the assault began with a bombardment from a Royal Artillery heavy regiment 7.2-inch (180 mm) howitzers and the field gun regiments and Royal Navy ships just offshore. Under their new commander, Lieutenant Colonel Eric Palmer, 41 Commando and forty-four armoured engineering vehicles attacked from the north, while other AVREs (77 Assault Squadron) created a diversion from the south-west. After half an hour of continuous bombardment, the armour advanced with 28 Sherman Crab mine-clearing tanks of the 22nd Dragoons, that cleared the way through the minefields using their machine guns and 75mm guns to suppress return fire. The 26th Assault Squadron's 17 Churchill tank AVREs with their spigot mortar demolition guns and demolition charges followed behind. At the same time the remainder of the squadron gave covering fire in particular against the supposed targets of the five anti-tank guns. While the Crabs were successful in clearing the minefields, AVRES with their high explosive bombs caused severe destruction; one hit a 50 mm gun and another an open emplacement at 60 yards (55 m) range. With demolition charges laid on the tops of the bunkers the effect was devastating to the German defenders.

At 5:40 p.m. the 160 men of 41 Commando rushed the bombarded positions and soon after swept over the outer defences. Not long after that they entered the casemates, tunnels and bunkers, where they found many shocked and dazed Germans. With nearly all the strongpoint taken, it was clear to the Germans that the station could no longer be defended. and they surrendered. The assault on the small station on the northern site was similarly successful. The 38 German defenders almost immediately gave up; like the others they had been dazed, shocked and exhausted by the bombardment.

== Aftermath ==
The two hundred and twenty seven remaining Luftwaffe personnel, including five officers, surrendered and the last of the 4th Special Service Brigade's D-Day objectives was finally achieved. 41 Commando had suffered six casualties including one killed, whilst the tank crews from the 79th Armoured Division suffered three killed and seven wounded. Four Crabs tanks disabled by mines, one AVRE was destroyed and another three were disabled during their close-range exchange with the German defenders. All but one of these tank was repairable.

By middle of June, with the last German stronghold near the beaches taken, the Allied beachhead was secure. The front-line was still 10 miles (16 km) beyond the beaches and that meant that Allied naval gunfire could break up any German attacks. Allied air forces, particularly the Typhoons dominating the sky could also break German troop concentrations.

The radar site at Douvres-la-Délivrande is now home to a museum, with two of the bunkers housing displays about the evolution and role of radar. The museum also maintains a rare preserved example of the Würzburg radar antenna.
