= No. 47 (Royal Marine) Commando =

WWII British military unit

- Cap Badge of the Royal Marines
- Active: 1 August 1943–1946
- Country: United Kingdom
- Branch: Royal Marines
- Type: Commando
- Role: Coastal raiding force Assault Infantry
- Size: Battalion
- Part of: 4th Special Service Brigade
- Nickname: Four Seven
- Motto: Per Mare Per Terram (By Sea By Land) (Latin)
- March: Quick - A Life on the Ocean Wave; Slow - Preobrajensky

Commanders
- Notable commanders: Lieutenant Colonel CF Phillips

Insignia
- Combined Operations Shoulder Patch

No. 47 (Royal Marine) Commando was a battalion size formation in the British Commandos, formed in August 1943 during the Second World War. The Commando was assigned to the 4th Special Service Brigade and served North West Europe and took part in the Normandy Landings, operations around Ostend, Antwerp and the Netherlands before being disbanded in January 1946.

In 2019, 1 Assault Group Royal Marines was renamed 47 Commando (Raiding Group), reviving the name of the original No. 47 Commando that served from 1943–1946.

== Background ==
The British Commandos were formed in 1940, by the order of Winston Churchill the British Prime Minister. He called for specially trained troops that would "develop a reign of terror down the enemy coast". At first they were a small force of volunteers who carried out small raids against enemy occupied territory, but by 1943 their role had changed into lightly equipped assault Infantry which specialised in spearheading amphibious landings.

The man selected as the overall commander of the force was Admiral Sir Roger Keyes himself a veteran of the landings at Galipoli and the Zeebrugge raid in the First World War. Initially the Commandos were a British Army formation the first Royal Marine Commando was formed in 1942. The Royal Marine Commandos like all British Commandos went through the six-week intensive commando course at Achnacarry. The course in the Scottish Highlands concentrated on fitness, speed marches, weapons training, map reading, climbing, small boat operations and demolitions both by day and by night.

No. 47 (Royal Marine) Commando under command of Lieutenant Colonel CF Phillips was formed from the 10th Royal Marine Battalion 1 August 1943, and based in Dorchester. Like all Commandos the men of No. 47 (Royal Marine) Commando had to attend the commando course at Achnacarry. They were then assigned to the all Royal Marine 4th Special Service Brigade alongside No. 41, No. 46 No. 48 (Royal Marine) Commandos. In 1943 the commando formation had been standardised, into a small headquarters, five fighting Troops, a Heavy Weapons troop and a signals platoon. The fighting Troops consisted of 65 all ranks divided into two 30 man sections which in turn were divided into three ten man sub sections. The Heavy Weapons Troop was made up of 3 inch Mortar and Vickers machine gun teams.

== Operations ==
=== June 1944 ===
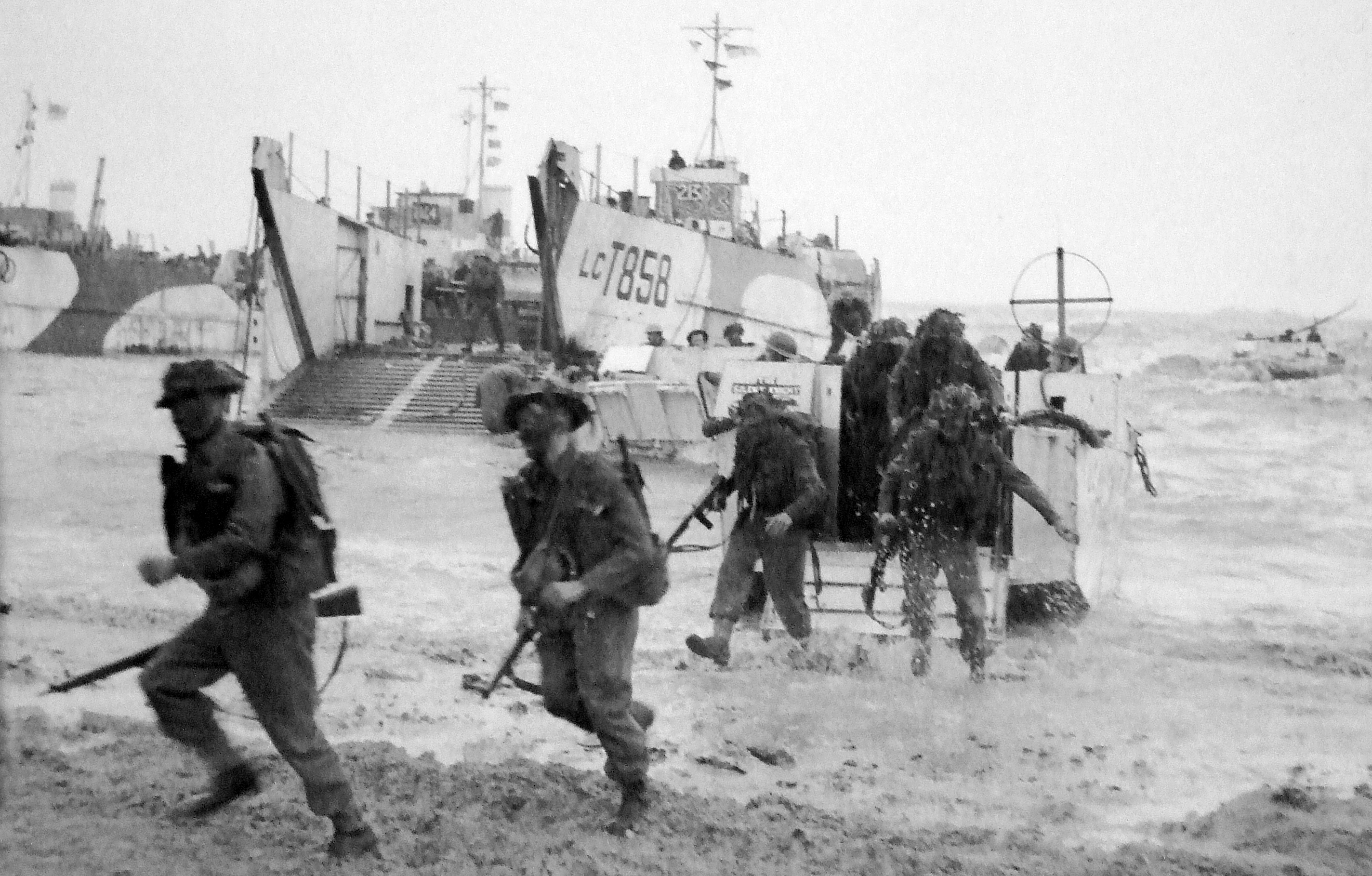
Commandos landing on Gold Beach

The first operation No. 47 (Royal Marine) Commando was involved in was Operation Neptune the Normandy landings better known as D-Day 6 June 1944. No. 47 landed at Gold Beach at 09:50 hours 6 June near the town of Asnelles. Five of the Landing Craft Assault carrying the Commando ashore were sunk by mines and beach obstacles with the loss of 76 of the 420 men in the Commando. These losses delayed No. 47's advance to their primary objective the port of Port-en-Bessin. Leaving the beaches after noon they fought through La Rosière and dug in around Escures for the night prior to their planned assault on Port-en-Bessin on the 7 June.

The capture of Port-en-Bessin given the codename Operation Aubery was essential for the Allies which was to become the main port for fuel deliveries to Normandy until Cherbourg had been liberated. The assault on Port-en-Bessin began at 16:00 hours 7 June supported by naval gunfire support was captured the next afternoon after fierce fighting. By the 8 June No. 47 now had a strength of 19 officers and 259 other ranks. The brigade was ordered to move into the area of Douvres-la-Délivrande and were then ordered to move east of the Orne River to reinforce the 6th Airborne Division.

On 11 June 4th Special Service Brigade was to take over the area occupied by the 12th Parachute Battalion No. 48 Commando occupied Hauger and No. 47 was held in reserve at Ecarde. Reinforcements from the holding commando in the United Kingdom brought No. 47's strength up to 23 officers and 357 other ranks. The Commando carried out patrolling, digging minefields and erecting barbed wire. On 18 June, NO. 47 handed over to No. 46 Commando and relocated to the Sallenelles to Orne bridge road and held in reserve. They were held in reserve for a week before taking over from No. 46 again.

=== August 1944 ===
On 1 August No. 47 moved to the Le Plein area to take over the positions occupied by No. 3 Commando. On 6 August No. 47 was ordered to relieve the 49th (West Riding) Division brigade west of Troarn. Patrolling led to the liberation of Saint-Pair and 4th Special Service Brigade moved up to the Dives River and Troarn was liberated. On 19 August No. 47 crossed the Dives River and occupied a position beyond the lead 6th Airborne Division units and on 20 August crossed the tributary of the Dives, at Putot-en-Auge to occupy a position to the right of No. 46 Commando. Over the night 20/21 August they moved up with No. 41 Commando to carry out a dawn attack on Dozulé which was occupied without any resistance. On 22 August No. 47 moved up to Fonts de la Cressonnière south west of Pont-l'Évêque and again went into reserve. Attacks planned for the 23 and 24 August were called off as the Germans had withdrawn and the brigade advance continued. On 24 August Y Troop was disbanded because of casualties and its remaining men divided between the other Troops and the Commando was transported to the Beuzeville area and received orders to advance towards the Seine River and cut off the retreating Germans. On 26 August Toutainville was liberated and the brigade was then rested until 31 August when they came under command I Corps) and 6th Airborne Division and 1st Special Service Brigade returned to the United Kingdom. The 4th Special Service Brigade was moved by road to the ferry crossing across the Seine River at Duclair crossing the river in assault boats they occupied a line along the Barentin to Le Havre road.

=== September 1944 ===
On 1 September again moving by road the brigade was moved up to Cany-Barville and on 2 September occupied Fécamp which cut off the German garrison in Le Havre. The advance continued on 15 September and by the night of 17/18 September No. 47 were in the area North of Dunkirk taking over positions in Ghyvelde from the Canadians. Here they remained until 26 September when they were relieved by 7th Black Watch. After being relieved they moved to Wenduine by the 27 September and prepared for amphibious operations. Training with L.V.T.'s was carried out in the sand dunes between Wenduine and Ostend and the Commando was brought up to full strength. Also a detachment from No. 2 (Dutch) Troop, No. 10 (Inter-Allied) Commando arrived. The training had been for Operation Infatuate the invasion of the island of Walcheren and at the end of October No. 47 moved to Ostend and embarked in Landing Craft Tanks.

== Battle of the Scheldt ==
The Battle of the Scheldt started 1 November 1944, with 4th Special Service Brigade assigned to carry out a seaborne assault on the island of Walcheren. The brigade now comprised No. 41, No. 47, No. 48, No. 10 (Inter-Allied), and No. 4 Commando. The Royal Marine Commandos would assault Westkapelle with No. 47 landing on a small strip of sand to the right of Westkapple, at a breach in the dyke caused by Royal Air Force bombing raids, prior to the attack.

No. 41 Commando landed first and moved North to Domburg, No. 48 Commando went South towards Zoutelande and were followed by No. 47 Commando. No. 47 Commando was split when two of the LCT's carrying them ashore beached on the Northern side of the gap instead of the Southern side. Due to the division of the force No. 47 did not assemble until 19:00 hours south of the Radar station having suffered the loss of 30 men and much of their radio equipment. On 2 November No. 47 passed through No. 48 and took over the advance to the Flushing gap. Meeting slight opposition until they reached the artillery battery W11, and made an unsuccessful attack that evening losing all five of their Troop commanders. Digging in for the night they repulsed a German assault and finally captured the artillery battery and the rest of the island on 3 November. On 10 November they were moved back to Breskens and then to Wenduine.

On 22 December at short notice No. 47 Commando moved to Breda to come under command Brigadier E.T. Boylan and became the I Corps mobile reserve known as Paddy Force. On the 24 December they moved again to Oosterhout and carried out patrols along the Meuse (Maas) under command 1st Polish Armoured Division. On 28 December three Troops from No. 48 Commando came under command for a fortnight. On 30 December the commanding officer Lieutenant Colonel C.F. Phillips was given command of the 116th Royal Marine Brigade a non commando Royal Marine formation. He was replaced as commanding officer by Lieutenant Colonel Donnell.

== 1945 ==
At the beginning of January No. 47 Commando carried out patrols on both banks of the Meuse (Maas) and were themselves twice ambushed by German patrols doing the same. On 9 January they were moved out of the line for training at Bergen op Zoom for Operation Horse an assault on the island of Kapelsche Veer planned for the night 13/14 January. The assault started at 01:00 hours with Q Troop and No. 5 (Norwegian) Troop, No. 10 (Inter Allied) Commando attacking the right flank supported by armour and artillery from the mainland, while the rest of No. 47 attacked on the left flank. Attacking from both flanks simultaneously under heavy mortar fire caused heavy casualties. By 05:00 hours it became obvious that the objective was too heavily defended for a lightly armed commando unit to capture alone so No. 47 was withdrawn. The island was eventually captured by a Canadian infantry brigade with artillery and armour support.

After their failed assault No. 47 was moved back to Bergen op Zoom on 16 January and then back to Walcheren island on 17 January. Where they took over garrison duties from No. 41 Commando on 18 January. While at Walcheren they received about 100 reinforcements which brought No. 47 almost up to full strength. On 12 March No. 47 moved to North Beveland to relieve No. 4 Commando which was completed by 16 March. No. 47 Commando now were given the task of training the 3rd Battalion of Infantry, Royal Netherlands Army formed from men in the liberated area of the Netherlands. No. 47 Commando were still here when the war in Europe ended 8 May.

On the 20 August No. 47 Commando became the first Royal Marine Commando to have an Army troop. No other Commando had such a mixture of Army and Royal Marine personnel. On the 31 August they moved to Oer-Erkenschwick where they were tasked with the administration of displaced persons. On 2 November No. 47 Commando moved to Warburg and were informed they would be soon returning to the United Kingdom. Leaving Germany on the 27 November they arrived in Haywards Heath on the 28 November where they remained until they were disbanded on 31 January 1946.

== Legacy ==
No. 47 (Royal Marine) Commando together with all the army commandos were disbanded after the Second World War and the commando role was taken over by the Royal Marines. However the present day Parachute Regiment, Special Air Service and Special Boat Service can all trace their origins to the Commandos.

On 5 November 2019 1 Assault Group Royal Marines (1 AGRM) was renamed 47 Commando (Raiding Group) Royal Marines, reviving the name of the original Commando.

== Battle honours ==
The following Battle honours were awarded to the British Commandos during the Second World War.

- Adriatic
- Alethangyaw
- Aller
- Anzio
- Argenta Gap
- Burma 1943–45
- Crete
- Dieppe
- Dives Crossing
- Djebel Choucha
- Flushing
- Greece 1944–45
- Italy 1943–45
- Kangaw
- Landing at Porto San Venere
- Landing in Sicily
- Leese
- Madagascar
- Middle East 1941, 1942, 1944
- Monte Ornito
- Myebon
- Normandy Landing
- North Africa 1941–43
- North-West Europe 1942, 1944–1945
- Norway 1941
- Pursuit to Messina
- Rhine
- St. Nazaire
- Salerno
- Sedjenane 1
- Sicily 1943
- Steamroller Farm
- Syria 1941
- Termoli
- Vaagso
- Valli di Comacchio
- Westkapelle
