= No. 48 (Royal Marine) Commando =

WWII British military unit

- Cap Badge of the Royal Marines
- Active: 1944–1946
- Country: United Kingdom
- Branch: Royal Marines
- Type: Commando
- Role: Coastal raiding force Assault Infantry
- Size: Battalion
- Part of: 4th Special Service Brigade
- Nickname: Four Eight
- Motto: Per Mare Per Terram (By Sea By Land) (Latin)
- March: Quick – A Life on the Ocean Wave; Slow – Preobrajensky

Commanders
- Notable commanders: Lieutenant Colonel James Moulton

Insignia
- Combined Operations Shoulder Patch

No. 48 (Royal Marine) Commando was a battalion-sized formation of the British Commandos, formed in 1944 during the Second World War. No. 48 Commando was assigned to the 4th Special Service Brigade and served in North West Europe, taking part in the Normandy landings and operations around Ostend and Antwerp before being disbanded after the war in January 1946.

== Background ==
The British Commandos were formed in 1940 by the order of Winston Churchill, the British Prime Minister. He called for specially trained troops that would "develop a reign of terror down the enemy coast". At first they were a small force of volunteers who carried out small raids against enemy occupied territory, but, by 1943, their role had evolved into lightly equipped assault Infantry that specialised in spearheading amphibious landings.

The man selected as the overall commander of the force was Admiral Sir Roger Keyes, a veteran of the landings at Galipoli and the Zeebrugge raid in the First World War. Initially, the Commandos were a British Army formation; the first Royal Marine Commando was formed in 1942. The Royal Marine Commandos, like all British Commandos, went through the six-week intensive commando course at Achnacarry. The course in the Scottish Highlands concentrated on fitness, speed marches, weapons training, map reading, climbing, small boat operations and demolitions both by day and by night. In 1943, the commando formation had been standardised into a small headquarters, five fighting Troops, a Heavy Weapons troop and a signals platoon. The fighting Troops consisted of 65 all ranks divided into two 30 man sections, which in turn were divided into three ten man sub sections. The Heavy Weapons Troop was made up of 3 inch Mortar and Vickers machine gun teams.

== Operations ==
Juno Beach, 6 June. No. 48 Commando landed at the extreme right

No. 48 (Royal Marine) Commando was formed in March 1944 and was the last commando unit formed during the Second World War. It was formed by the conversion of the 7th Royal Marine Battalion and the Mobile Naval Base Defence Organisations (MNBDOs) defence battalions to commando duties. Under the command of Lieutenant Colonel James Moulton, it carried out a shortened commando course at Achnacarry and then joined the all Royal Marine 4th Special Service Brigade alongside No. 41, No. 46 and No. 47 (Royal Marine) Commandos.

Assigned to the Normandy landings, 4th Special Service Brigade was given the task of seizing a number of coastal villages, including Luc-sur-Mer, St. Aubin-sur-Mer and Langrune-sur-Mer. The Brigade then had to push inland and capture the heavily fortified strong point near the radar station at Douvres, which they were required to hold on to for 48 hours before being relieved.

Landing on the Canadian Juno Beach, No. 48 (Royal Marine) Commando was the first Commando unit to land near Saint-Aubin-sur-Mer and started the assault on Langrune-sur-Mer, which was liberated after heavy fighting and severe losses. They then held a position awaiting reinforcement and equipment to land.

The rest of 4th Special Service Brigade carried out two attacks to take a German hill position near the village of Dozule. After the failure of both attacks, No. 48 was reinforced by No. 46 and No. 47 Commandos. Reinforced, No.48 Commando bypassed the village of Dozule to occupy the high ground at point 120, in the process cutting off a number of retreating Germans and destroying their vehicles.

Instead of being withdrawn after 48 hours, No. 4 Special Service Brigade continued in the Allied advance to the Seine. On route liberating Pont l'Eveque, Saint-Maclou, Pavilly, Yerville, Motteville, Yvetot, Bermonville and Valmont before coming out of the line on 18 August 1944.

=== Battle of the Scheldt ===
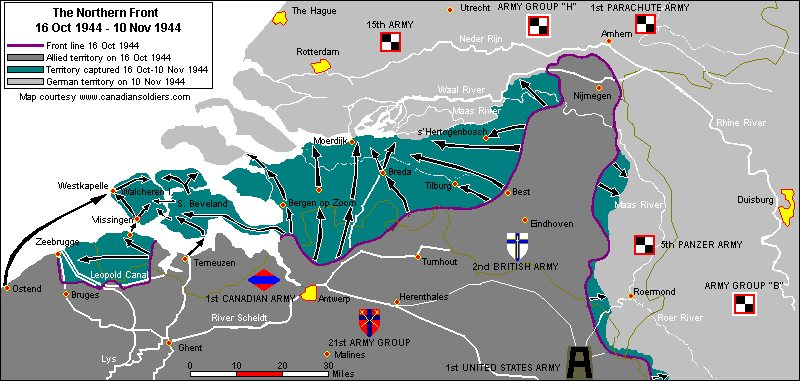
Northern front October to November 1944

4th Special Service Brigade returned to the front line to take part in the Battle of the Scheldt and Operation Infatuate in November 1944, tasked with the liberation of the island of Walcheren.

On 1 November, No. 48 Commando disembarked from tank landing craft and, under German shell fire, captured their first objective – a row of concrete gun emplacements on the southern shoulder of the gap – and then moved on to their next objective, a radar station that had been abandoned by the German defenders. Their next objective, an artillery battery, was assaulted by Y Troop, who were all either killed or wounded before they could reach it. Calling for naval gunfire support from H.M.S. Roberts and artillery support from 2nd Canadian Division, the position was next assaulted by Z Troop. Z Troop's assault also failed, with half of them being killed or wounded by German mortar fire. The position was again targeted by the 2nd Canadian artillery and RAF rocket firing Hawker Typhoons. Assaulted again by No. 48 Commando, the battery was eventually captured and 100 Germans made prisoner of war. No. 48 Commando's next objective was the capture of Zouteland, which was planned for 2 November. The attack started at dawn, following a bombardment from H.M.S. Erebus; the garrison surrendered after two hours of fighting.

Following the Battle of the Scheldt, No. 48 Commando raided across the Meuse (Maas) in the Netherlands and then took part in the army of occupation in Germany.

== Legacy ==
No. 48 (Royal Marine) Commando, together with all the army commandos and some Royal Marine commandos, was disbanded in 1946 and the commando role was taken over by the Royal Marines. However, the present day Parachute Regiment, Special Air Service and Special Boat Service can all trace their origins to the Commandos.

== Battle honours ==
The following Battle honours were awarded to the British Commandos during the Second World War.

- Adriatic
- Alethangyaw
- Aller
- Anzio
- Argenta Gap
- Burma 1943–45
- Crete
- Dieppe
- Dives Crossing
- Djebel Choucha
- Flushing
- Greece 1944–45
- Italy 1943–45
- Kangaw
- Landing at Porto San Venere
- Landing in Sicily
- Leese
- Madagascar
- Middle East 1941, 1942, 1944
- Monte Ornito
- Myebon
- Normandy Landing
- North Africa 1941–43
- North-West Europe 1942, 1944–1945
- Norway 1941
- Pursuit to Messina
- Rhine
- St. Nazaire
- Salerno
- Sedjenane 1
- Sicily 1943
- Steamroller Farm
- Syria 1941
- Termoli
- Vaagso
- Valli di Comacchio
- Westkapelle
