= Battle of Port-en-Bessin =

1944 battle

- Part of the Normandy landings
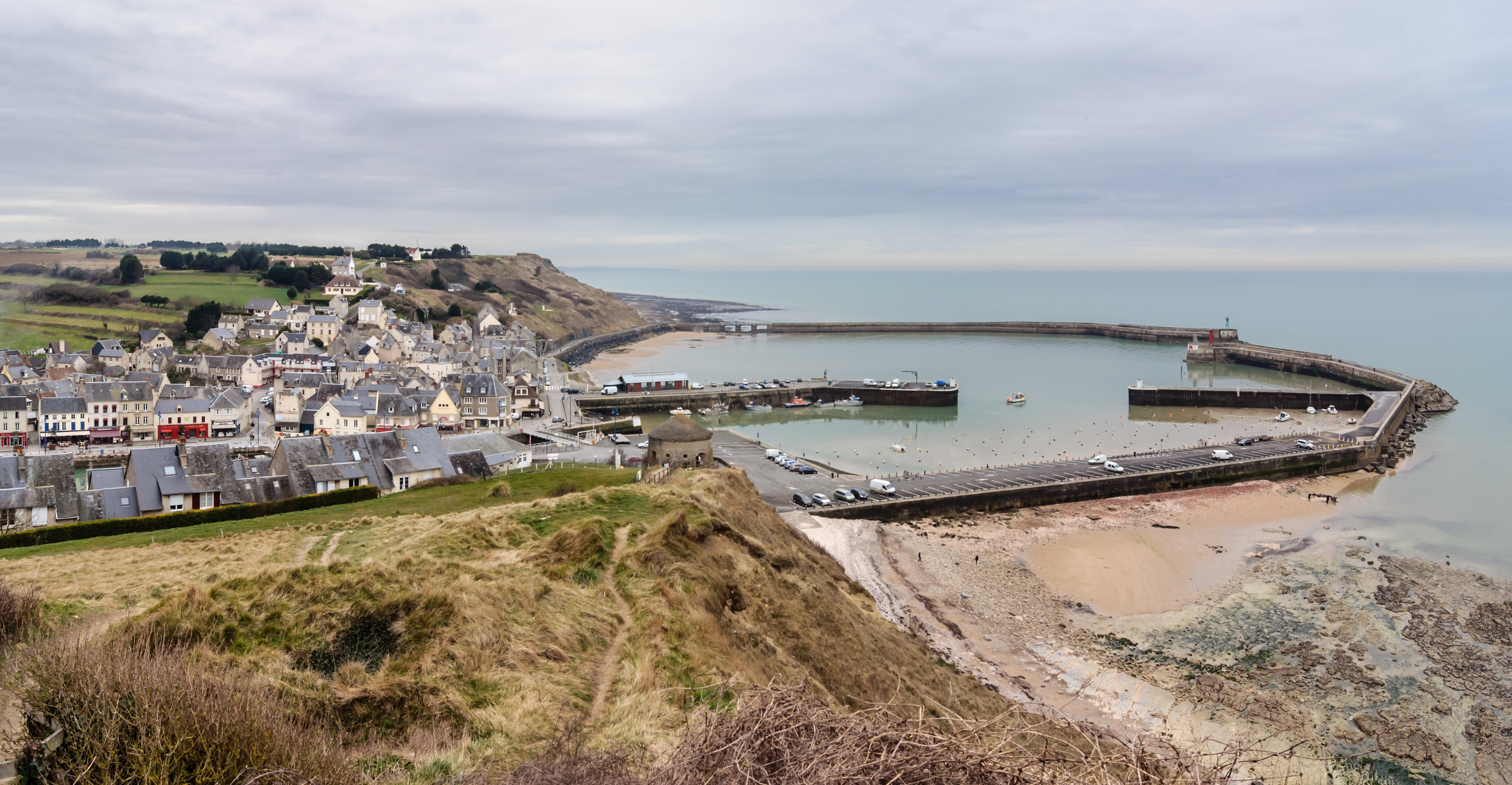
- Recent view of Port-en-Bessin.
Date	7–8 June 1944
Location	Port-en-Bessin, Normandy, France 49°20′42″N 00°45′14″W
Result	Allied victory

Belligerents
United Kingdom	Germany

Commanders and leaders
(United Kingdom) C. F. Phillips	(Nazi Germany) Dietrich Kraiß

Strength
Elements of 47 Commando: c. 420 men 328 during assault	Elements of 352nd Division; 2 Flakships

Casualties and losses
136 casualties: 46 killed 70 wounded	300 prisoners (incomplete)

The Battle of Port-en-Bessin also known as Operation Aubery took place from 7–8 June 1944, at a small fishing harbour west of Arromanches during the Normandy landings of World War II. The village was between Omaha Beach to the west in the U.S. V Corps sector, and Gold Beach to the east in the British XXX Corps sector. An objective during Operation Overlord, the fortified port was captured by No. 47 (Royal Marine) Commando of the 4th Special Service Brigade.

== Background ==
=== Omaha and Gold beaches ===
The port lay between Omaha and Gold beaches and was close to Blay, the site of a prospective command post for General B. L. Montgomery, the Allied Ground Forces Commander. British petrol and oil storage depots were also to be established near the port and for American forces at St. Honorine 2 miles (3.2 km) west, under the code-name Tombola, to be filled from tankers offshore, using buoyed pipelines. The first pipeline into Port-en-Bessin opened on 25 June.

== Prelude ==
=== Invasion of Normandy ===
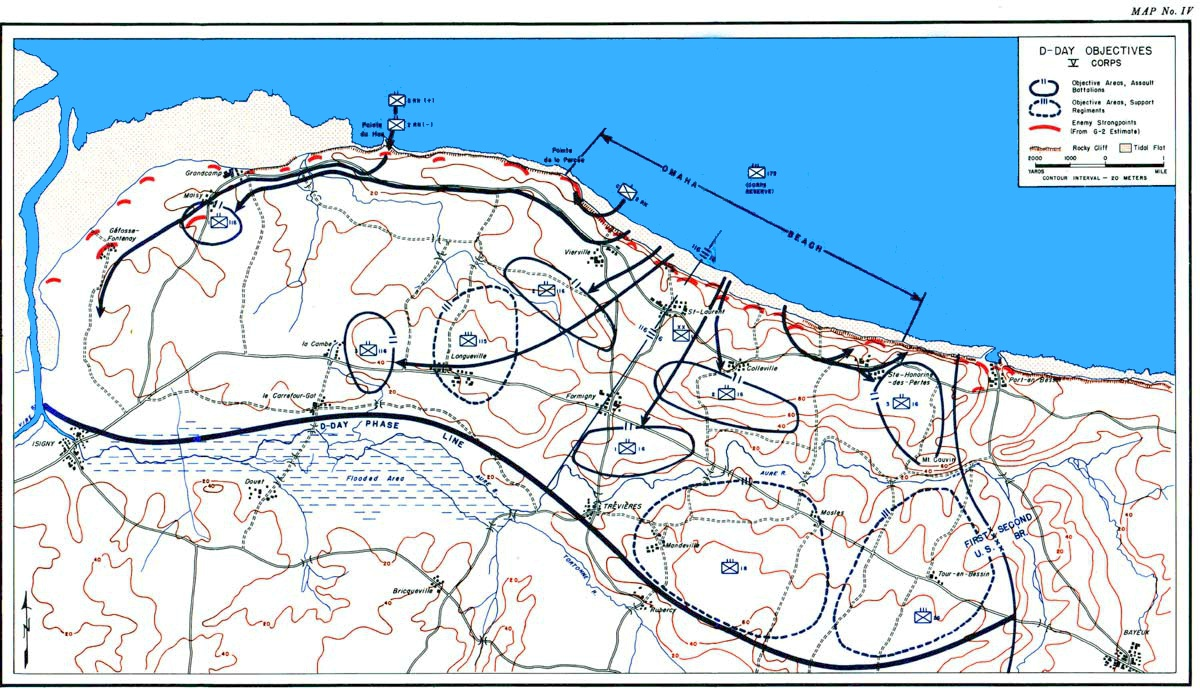
Official map showing the V US Corps objectives for D-Day, Port-en-Bessin is on the eastern flank of Omaha Beach

47 RM commando embarked on transport ships for the invasion on 3 June 1944 and left the Solent in two ships on 5 June. At 5:00 a.m. on 6 June, 8 miles (13 km) off the Normandy coast, they were loaded into 14 Landing Craft Assault (LCA), each carrying 30 marines and headed for Gold Beach. Soon the big guns at Le Hamel and at Longues were able to target the approaching LCAs. As a result of this one LCA was hit and sank, twelve marines were killed or drowned, eleven were seriously injured but they were still able to reach the shore. As the other LCAs moved in, they had to cross a wide band of Belgian Gates constructed from steel girders, many of which were tipped with mines. The tide covered many of the obstacles as 47 (RM) Commando LCAs passed over them, preventing the obstacles from being removed by the marines and four of the LCAs were impaled and sunk by attached explosives. Some Marines swam ashore but 43 men and much of the unit wireless equipment were lost.

=== Landing ===
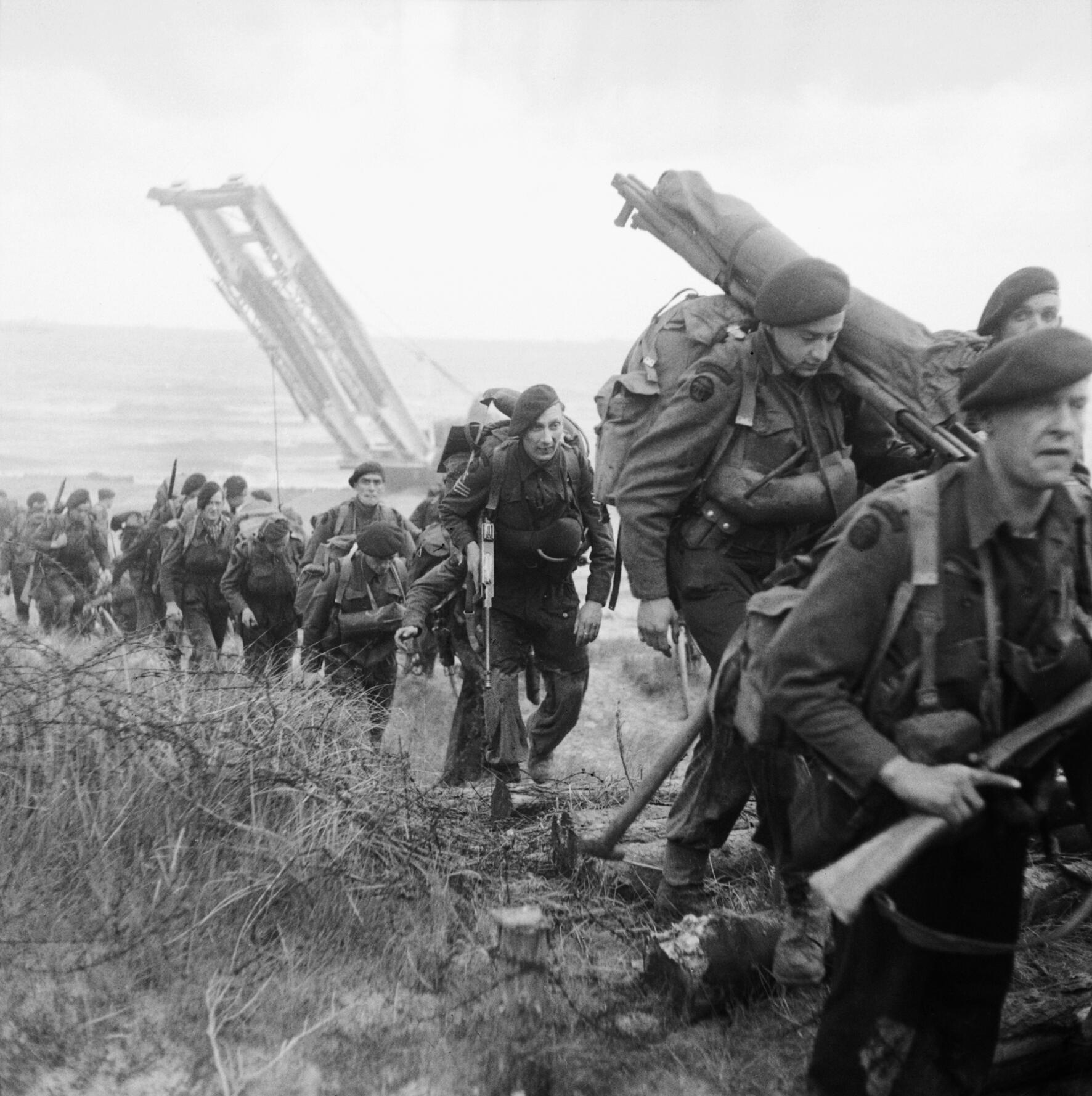
British Commandos move inland during Operation Overlord

Mustering on the beach, 47 (RM) Commando had about 300 men left, having lost 28 killed or drowned, 21 wounded and 27 missing. The Commandos borrowed a radio from the headquarters of the 231st Infantry Brigade and set off across the countryside in the direction of Port-en-Bessin. The Marines had been ordered to avoid troops of the 726th Regiment of the 716th Static Infantry Division at Longues-sur-Mer on the road from Arromanches to Port-en-Bessin, by moving inland, before heading for the port 12 miles (19 km) west and linking with the First US Army as it advanced from Omaha beach. In the early evening the 47 Commando met German troops at La Rosière, where one commando was killed and eleven others were wounded. German weapons and equipment were taken by the men of 47 Commando to replace the equipment that they had lost during the landing. By the time the sun had set 47 Commando had reached Point 72 at Escures, about 1.5 miles (2.4 km) from the port, where they dug in, in order for the Commandos to prepare to attack the German positions in and around Port-en-Bessin early next morning.

== Battle ==
=== 7–8 June ===
The main defences of Port-en-Bessin were on 200-foot (61 m) high cliffs known as the Western and Eastern features, either side of the hollow in which the port lay. An entrenched and concreted position had been built just south of the port on the Bayeux road, with more defences in the harbour. Before the wireless was repaired to arrange covering fire, the Marines began a house-to-house battle through the port. The defensive position on the Bayeux road was charged and quickly overcome and its occupants captured. In the afternoon, after a bombardment by HMS Emerald and three squadrons of Typhoons firing RP-3 rockets, the cliff-top strong points were attacked and the base of the western feature captured. A troop advanced on the eastern feature against rifle and machine-gun fire and grenades being thrown down the open slope, which was also mined and had hidden flame-throwers. When the Marines were well up the slope, two FLAK ships in the harbour opened fire, killing twelve and wounding 17 men, more than half the troop in a few minutes, forcing it to withdraw.

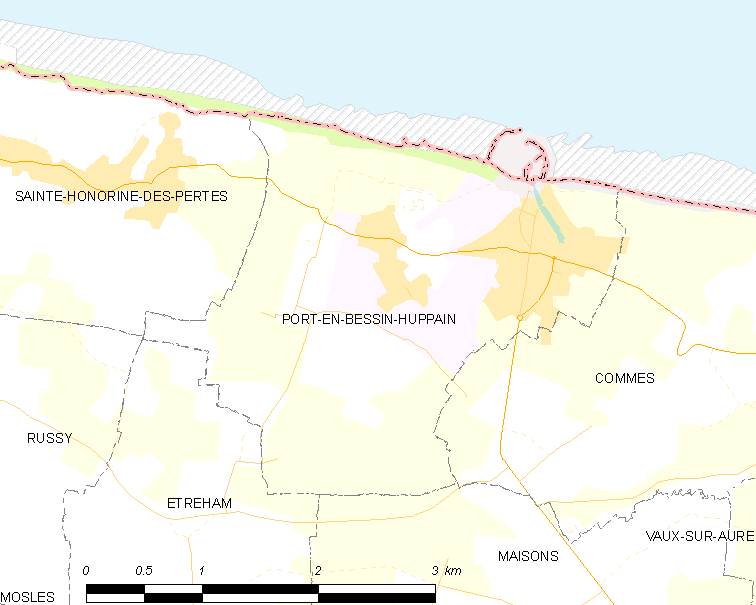
Map of Port-en-Bessin area (commune FR insee code 14515)

German counter-attacks overran the Commando rear headquarters and an attack across the Escures–Port-en-Bessin road cut off the troop defending Escures. The strength of the commando in the port was reduced to 280 men, many of whom were wounded but an ammunition shortage was alleviated by several members of 522 Company Royal Army Service Corps, who drove supplies through German machine-gun and tank fire. The German defences in the harbour area consisted of dispersed strong points, which the Marines attacked individually and gradually cleared the harbour in a series of costly attacks. The FLAK ships continued to fire and ammunition ran low. Marine Captain Cousins led reconnaissance patrol towards the eastern feature and found an undefended zig-zag path up to the fortifications at the top. With darkness falling Cousins led a party of four officers and 25 men up the hill unobserved and surprised the defenders, who were thrown into confusion. The Marines then encountered a concrete bunker, which Cousins and four men rushed. Cousins was killed by a grenade and the men accompanying him were wounded but the German bunker was captured. Outnumbered four to one by the Germans, they fought their way up the feature through the concrete, entrenchments, mines and barbed wire defences. The German positions were captured one-by-one and before dawn the eastern feature had been occupied. The fall of the Eastern Feature persuaded the remaining Germans on the Western Feature to surrender. Capt Terry Cousins was nominated for the Victoria Cross for his leadership, courage and initiative but was declined much to the Commandos' disgust. The Commandos re-occupied Escures and at 4:00 a.m. on 8 June, the garrison commander and 300 men surrendered.

== Aftermath ==
=== Analysis ===
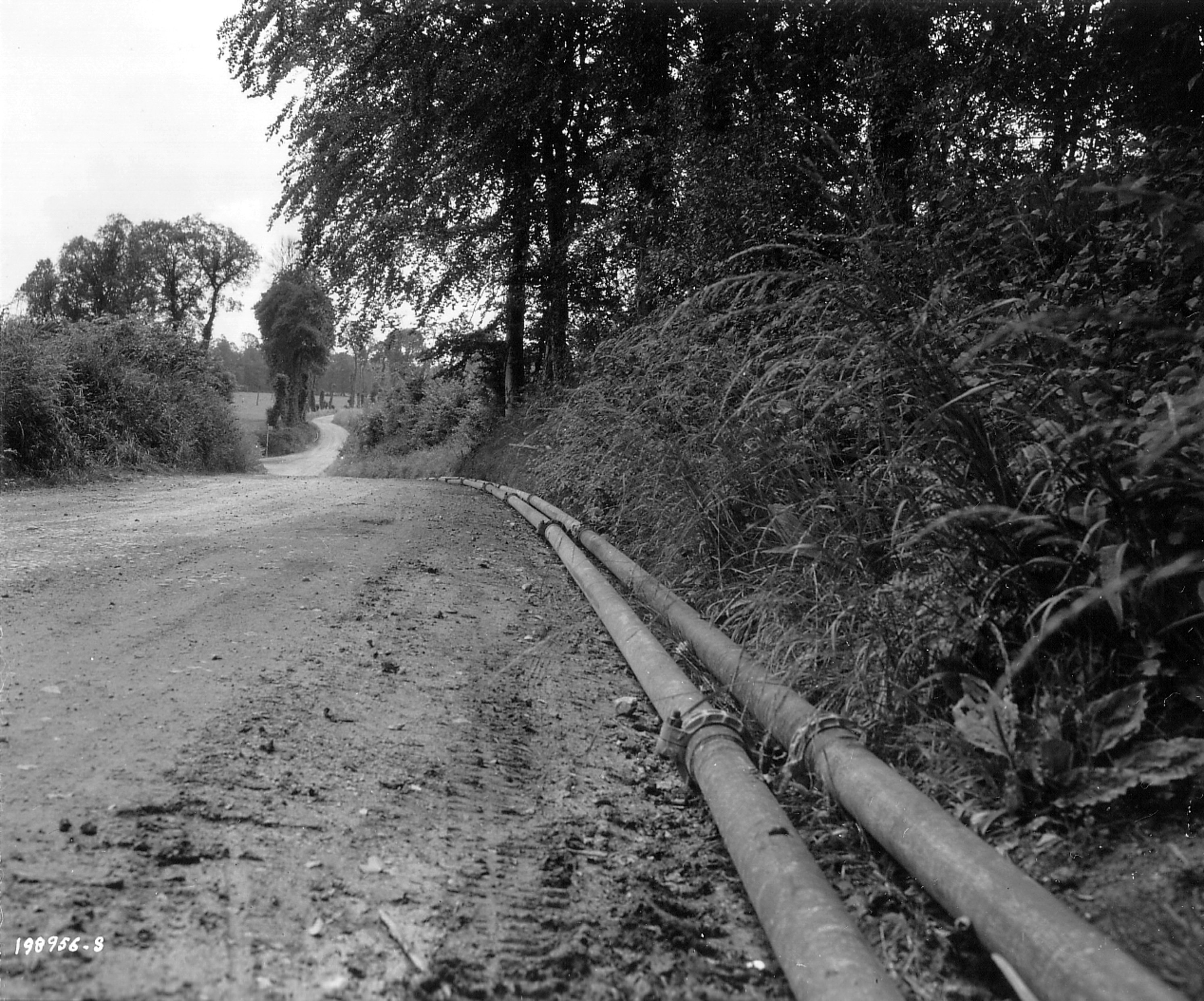
PLUTO Pipeline through Port-en-Bessin

By 8 June, 47 Commando had been reduced to a strength of c. 200 officers and other ranks. The battalion was ordered to move into the area of Douvres-la-Délivrande and were then ordered to move east of the Orne River to reinforce the British 6th Airborne Division. Lieutenant-General Sir Brian G. Horrocks, commander of XXX Corps towards the end of the Normandy Campaign, wrote of 47 Royal Marine Commando's capture of Port-en-Bessin: "It is doubtful whether, in their long, distinguished history, the marines have ever achieved anything finer."

Sir Robert Bruce Lockhart, historian and Director General of the British Political Warfare Executive during World War II, described 47 RM Commando's performance as: "The most spectacular of all commando exploits during the actual invasion."

Julian Thompson wrote: "In my opinion the operation by 47 RM Commando at Port-en-Bessin was one of the great feats of arms of any unit, Royal Marines, Army, Navy or Air Force of any nation in the Second World War." The next day soldiers from the 16th (US) Infantry Regiment who had landed at Omaha Beach on D-Day moved toward Port-en-Bessin and eventually linked up with 47 Commando, joining together the British and American beaches. The major American PLUTO terminal would be located at Cherbourg, however the town would not be finally captured until 30 June, so Port-en-Bessin would play an important role in supplying the allied army fighting in Normandy.

=== Casualties ===
47 (Royal Marine) Commando had 136 casualties, 46 killed and 70 wounded.

== See also ==
- British Commando operations during the Second World War
