= Port-en-Bessin-Huppain =

- Commune
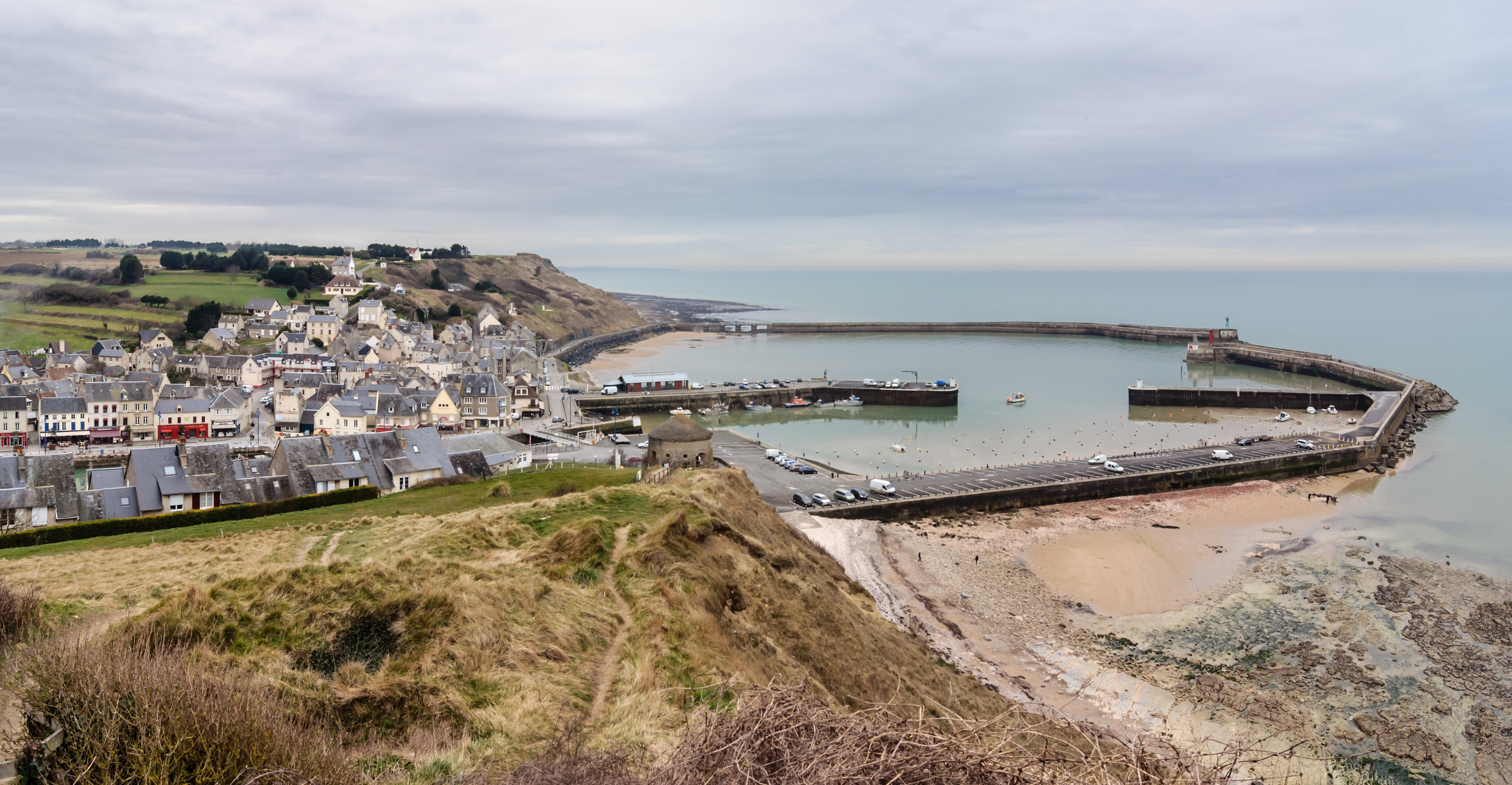
- Port-en-Bessin-Huppain, seen from above the Vauban Tower

- Coat of arms
- Location of Port-en-Bessin-Huppain
- Location within France Location within Normandy
- Coordinates: 49°20′42″N 0°45′14″W
- Country: France
- Region: Normandy
- Department: Calvados
- Arrondissement: Bayeux
- Canton: Bayeux
- Intercommunality: CC Bayeux Intercom

Government
  - Mayor (2020–2026): Christophe Van Roye
- Area^{1}: 7.56 km^{2} (2.92 sq mi)
- Elevation: 50 m (160 ft)
- Highest elevation: 74 m (243 ft)
- Lowest elevation: 0 m (0 ft)
- Population (2023): 1,876
  - Density: 248/km^{2} (643/sq mi)
- Time zone: UTC+01:00 (CET)
  - Summer (DST): UTC+02:00 (CEST)
- INSEE/Postal code: 14515 /14520
- ^{1} French Land Register data, which excludes lakes, ponds, glaciers > 1 km^{2} (0.386 sq mi or 247 acres) and river estuaries.

Port-en-Bessin-Huppain (French pronunciation: [pɔʁ ɑ̃ bɛsɛ̃ ypɛ̃]) is a commune in the Calvados department in the Normandy region in northwestern France.

The commune contains the two suburban areas of Port-en-Bessin and Huppain.

== Population ==
Historical population
Year	Pop.	±% p.a.
1968	2,132	—
1975	2,388	+1.63%
1982	2,332	−0.34%
1990	2,308	−0.13%
1999	2,139	−0.84%
2007	2,019	−0.72%
2012	2,039	+0.20%
2017	1,942	−0.97%
2023	1,876	−0.57%
Source: INSEE

== History ==
The name Huppain stems from Norse/Norwegian Oppheim, reflecting the general Viking history of Normandy.

The town was captured by Royal Marines of No. 47 (Royal Marine) Commando in Operation Aubery during the Normandy landings and used as the terminal for PLUTO (Pipe-Lines Under The Ocean).

== Media ==
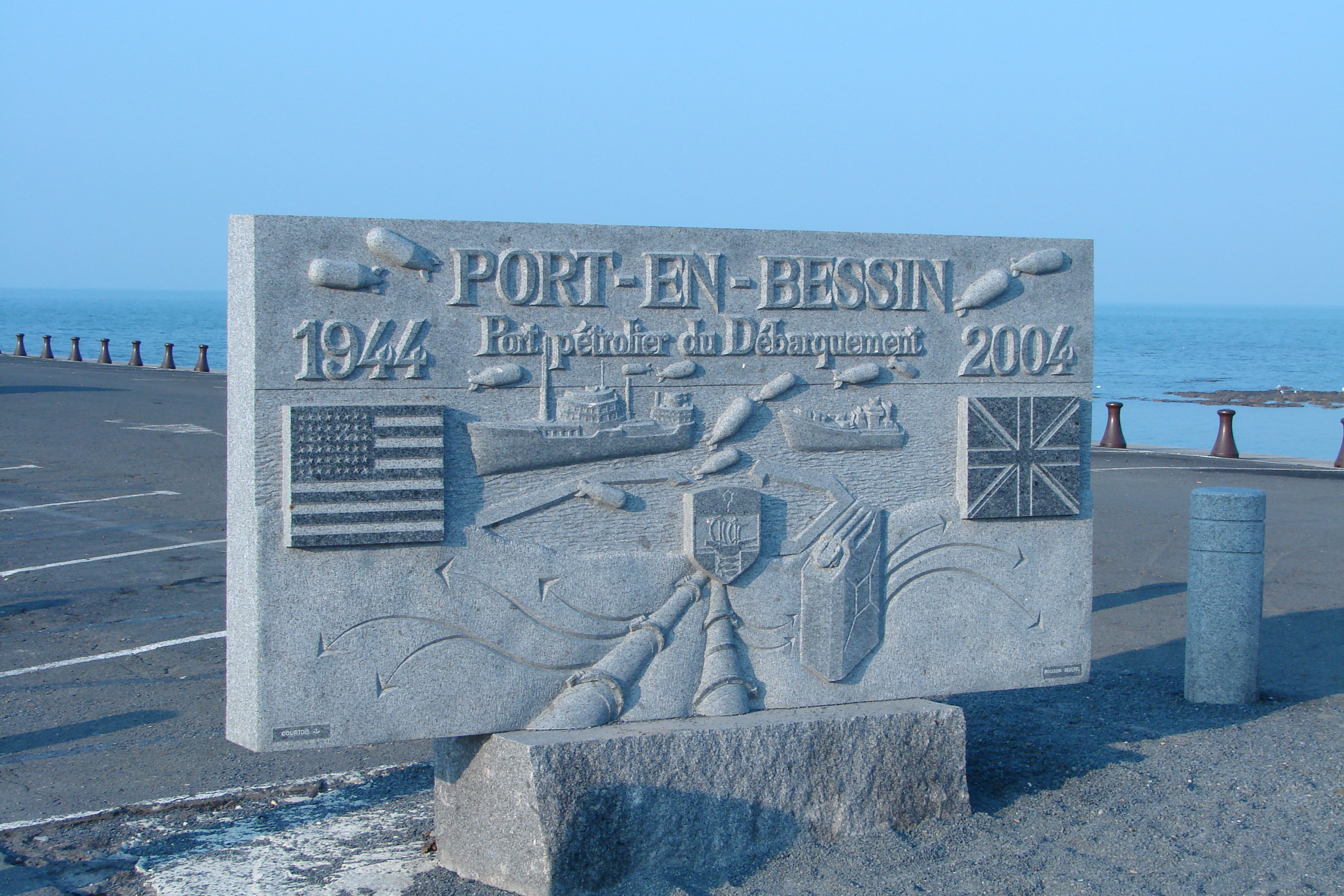
Tablet of D-Day

Port-en-Bessin was used to represent nearby Ouistreham in the 1962 film The Longest Day.

== Sister cities ==
- Saint-Pierre, Saint Pierre and Miquelon (France), since 1976.

== See also ==
- Communes of the Calvados department

== Gallery ==
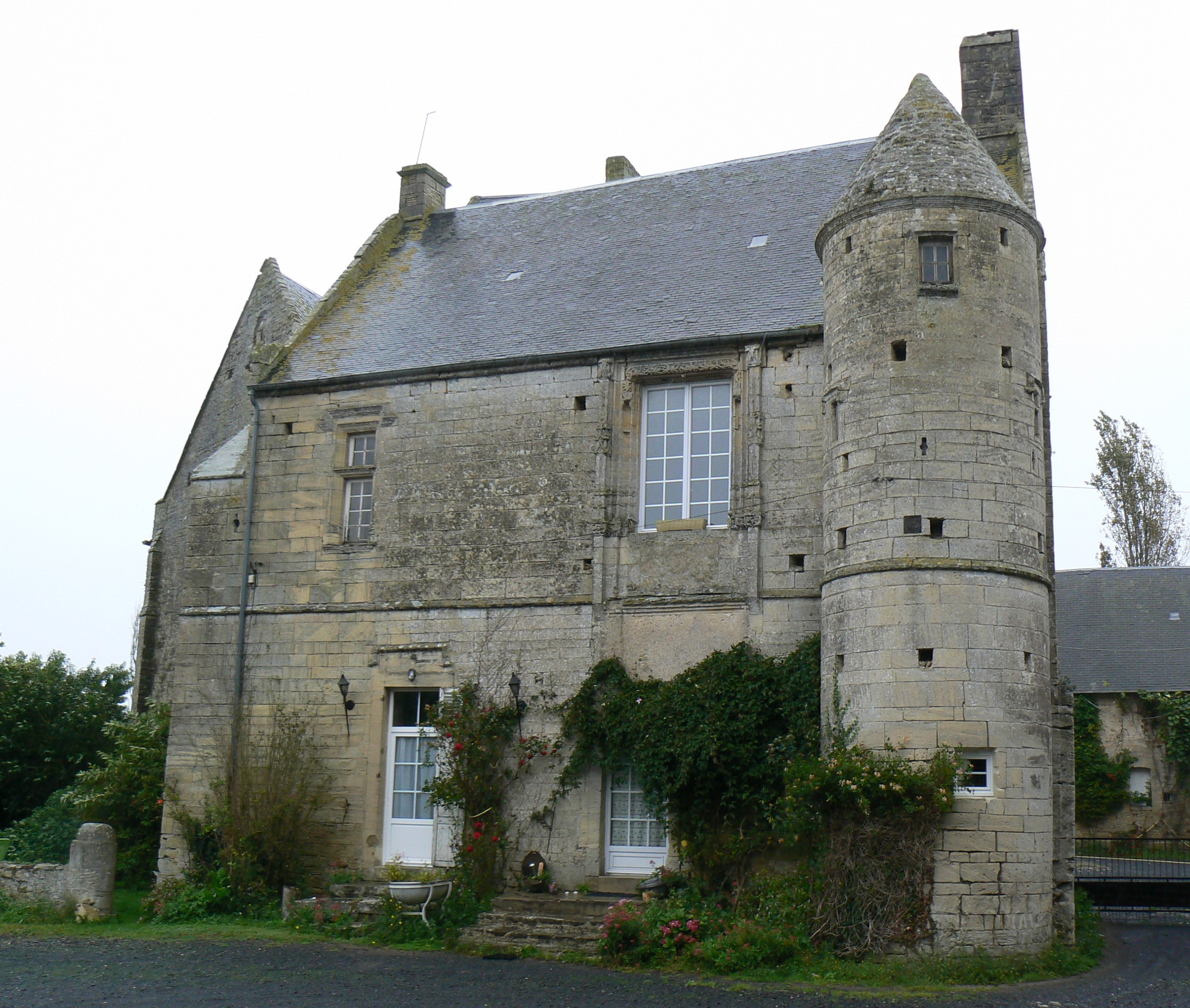
Château de Villiers-sur-Port

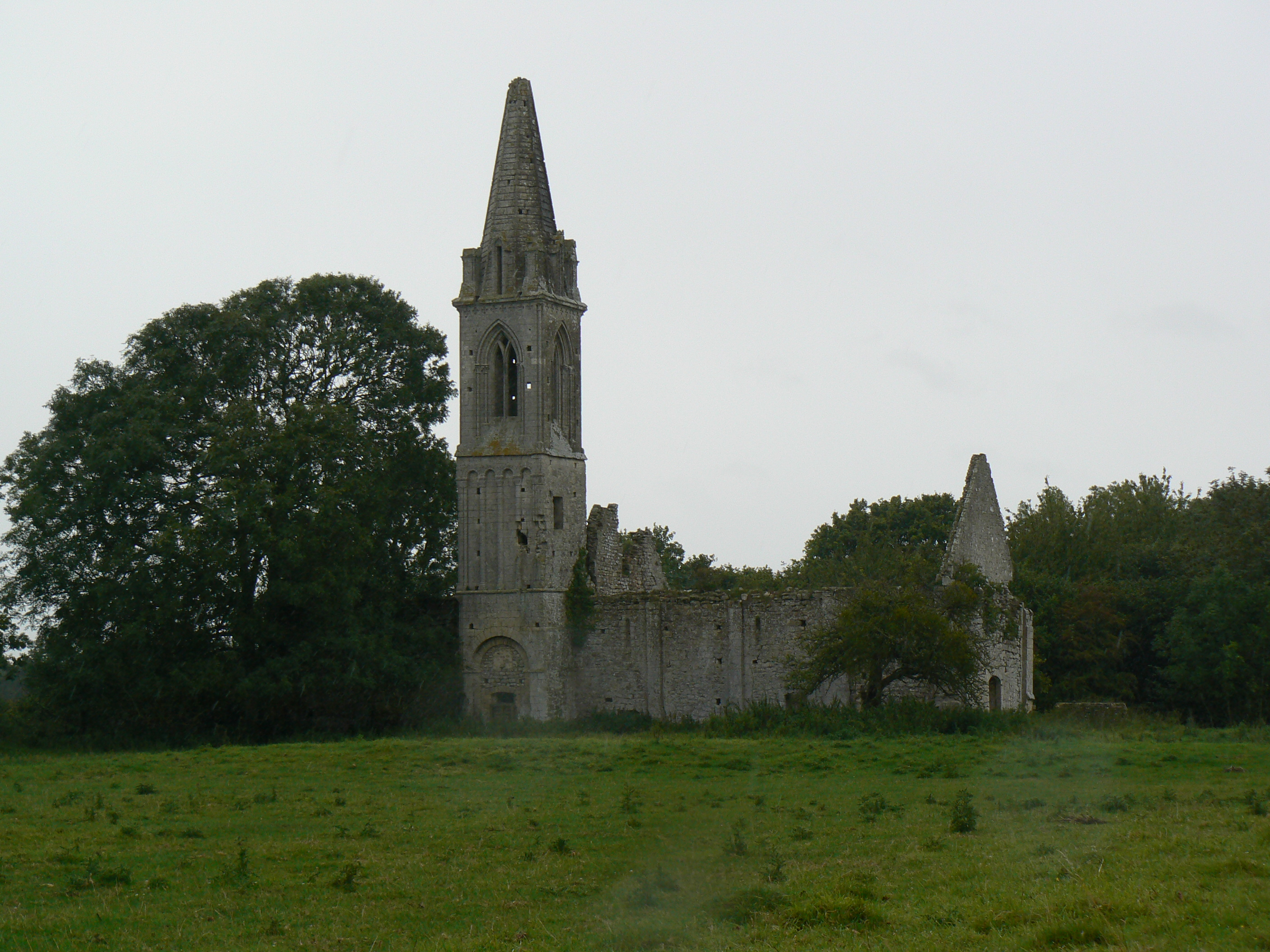
Église Saint-Nicolas de Villiers-sur-Port

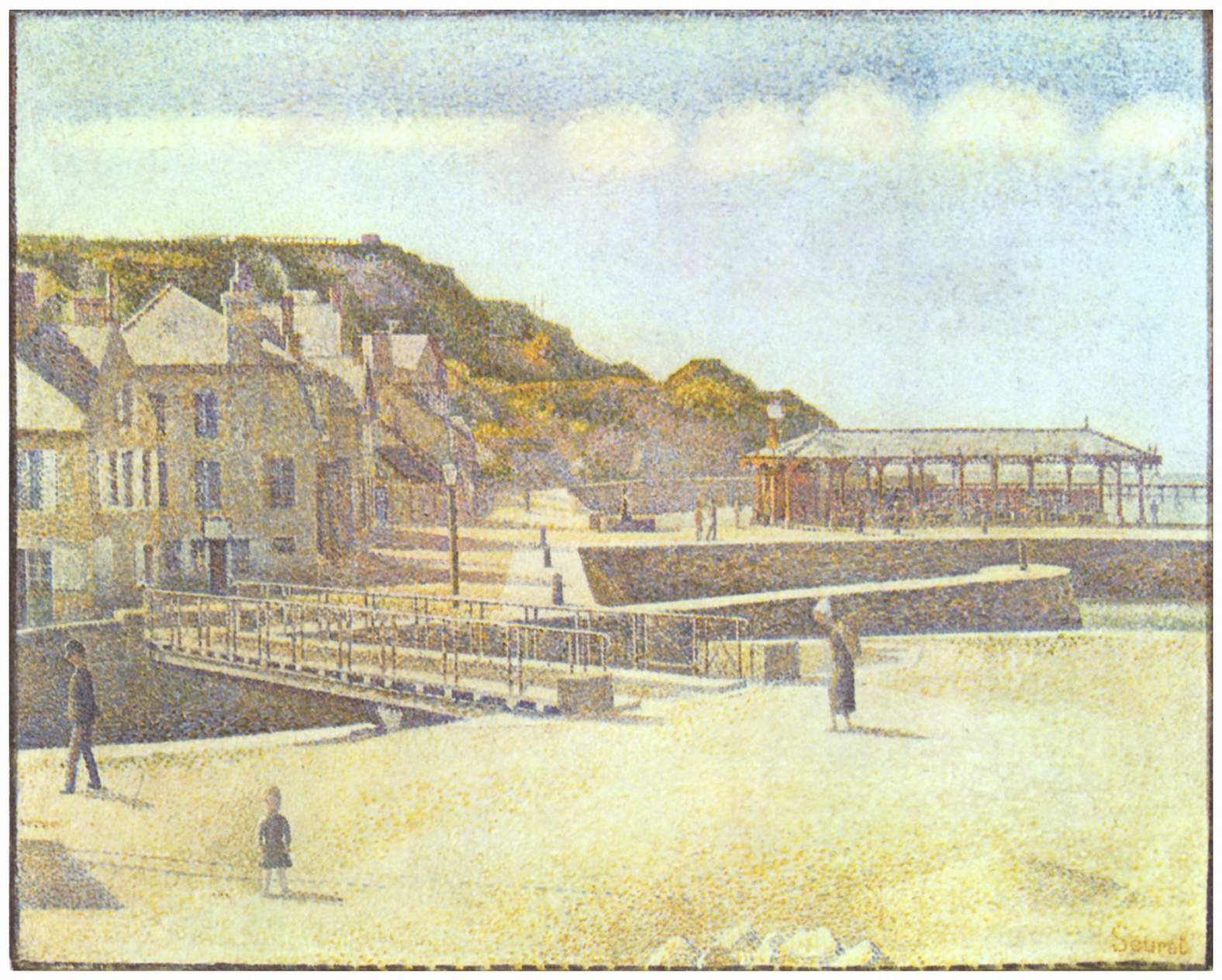
Bridge and port of Port-en-Bessin-Huppain, by Georges Seurat, 1888

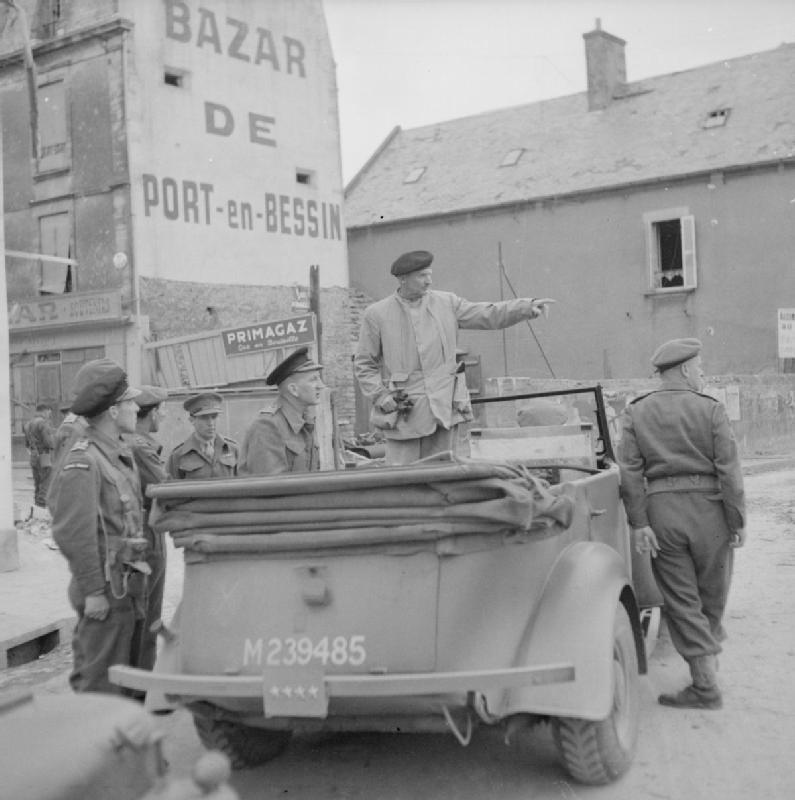
General Montgomery with Army and Royal Navy officers in Port-en-Bessin, 10 June 1944 in the Normandy Campaign

== Climate ==
Climate data for Port-en-Bessin-Huppain (1984–2007 normals, extremes 1984–2007)
Month	Jan	Feb	Mar	Apr	May	Jun	Jul	Aug	Sep	Oct	Nov	Dec	Year
Record high °C (°F)	15.6 (60.1)	19.2 (66.6)	22.1 (71.8)	24.4 (75.9)	31.3 (88.3)	32.1 (89.8)	31.0 (87.8)	33.7 (92.7)	31.4 (88.5)	27.6 (81.7)	19.1 (66.4)	16.4 (61.5)	33.7 (92.7)
Mean daily maximum °C (°F)	8.2 (46.8)	8.5 (47.3)	10.6 (51.1)	12.2 (54.0)	15.0 (59.0)	17.9 (64.2)	20.0 (68.0)	20.6 (69.1)	18.7 (65.7)	15.7 (60.3)	11.5 (52.7)	8.9 (48.0)	14.0 (57.2)
Daily mean °C (°F)	5.8 (42.4)	6.0 (42.8)	7.7 (45.9)	9.2 (48.6)	12.0 (53.6)	14.6 (58.3)	16.7 (62.1)	17.2 (63.0)	15.5 (59.9)	12.8 (55.0)	8.8 (47.8)	6.6 (43.9)	11.1 (52.0)
Mean daily minimum °C (°F)	3.4 (38.1)	3.4 (38.1)	4.9 (40.8)	6.2 (43.2)	9.1 (48.4)	11.4 (52.5)	13.4 (56.1)	13.8 (56.8)	12.4 (54.3)	9.9 (49.8)	6.2 (43.2)	4.2 (39.6)	8.2 (46.8)
Record low °C (°F)	−15.4 (4.3)	−10.8 (12.6)	−3.9 (25.0)	−1.0 (30.2)	2.0 (35.6)	4.8 (40.6)	7.8 (46.0)	6.8 (44.2)	3.0 (37.4)	−0.3 (31.5)	−4.2 (24.4)	−6.7 (19.9)	−15.4 (4.3)
Average precipitation mm (inches)	75.3 (2.96)	59.2 (2.33)	56.8 (2.24)	53.5 (2.11)	52.7 (2.07)	53.7 (2.11)	50.1 (1.97)	53.7 (2.11)	59.9 (2.36)	81.1 (3.19)	82.8 (3.26)	84.7 (3.33)	763.5 (30.06)
Average precipitation days (≥ 1.0 mm)	13.0	10.9	10.7	9.8	9.8	8.5	8.4	8.7	9.4	12.4	14.1	13.2	128.8
Source: Meteociel
