= 41 Commando =

'B' Commando No. 41 (Royal Marine) Commando
- Cap Badge of the Royal Marines
- Active: 1943–1945; 1950–1951; 1960–1981
- Country: United Kingdom
- Branch: Royal Marines
- Type: Commando
- Role: Coastal raiding force Assault Infantry
- Size: Battalion
- Part of: 4th Special Service Brigade 1943–1945; 3 Commando Brigade 1960–1981
- Nickname: Four One
- Motto: Per Mare Per Terram (By Sea By Land) (Latin)
- March: Quick – A Life on the Ocean Wave; Slow – Preobrajensky

Commanders
- Notable commanders: Lieutenant Colonel Douglas Burns Drysdale DSO, MBE

Insignia
- Commando Flash

41 Commando or No. 41 (Royal Marine) Commando was a unit of the Royal Marines trained as Commandos during the Second World War. As part of the Special Service Brigade the unit took part in the Allied invasion of Sicily and later in 1943 the Salerno landings. The unit's other operations included the Normandy landings in June 1944 et seq, the Korean War, in Northern Ireland, and in Cyprus (UNFICYP).

41 Commando is particularly notable for having fought beside the American 1st Marine Division at the Battle of Chosin Reservoir during the Korean War, for which 41 Commando received the Presidential Unit Citation, the highest U.S. award presented to a military unit, in 1957. 41 Commando was reformed and disbanded several times during its history, most recently in 1981.

== History ==
=== Second World War ===
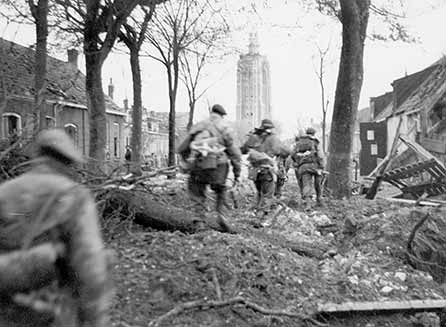
Troops from 41 Commando advance towards the lighthouse at Westkapelle, Netherlands, Nov 1, 1944

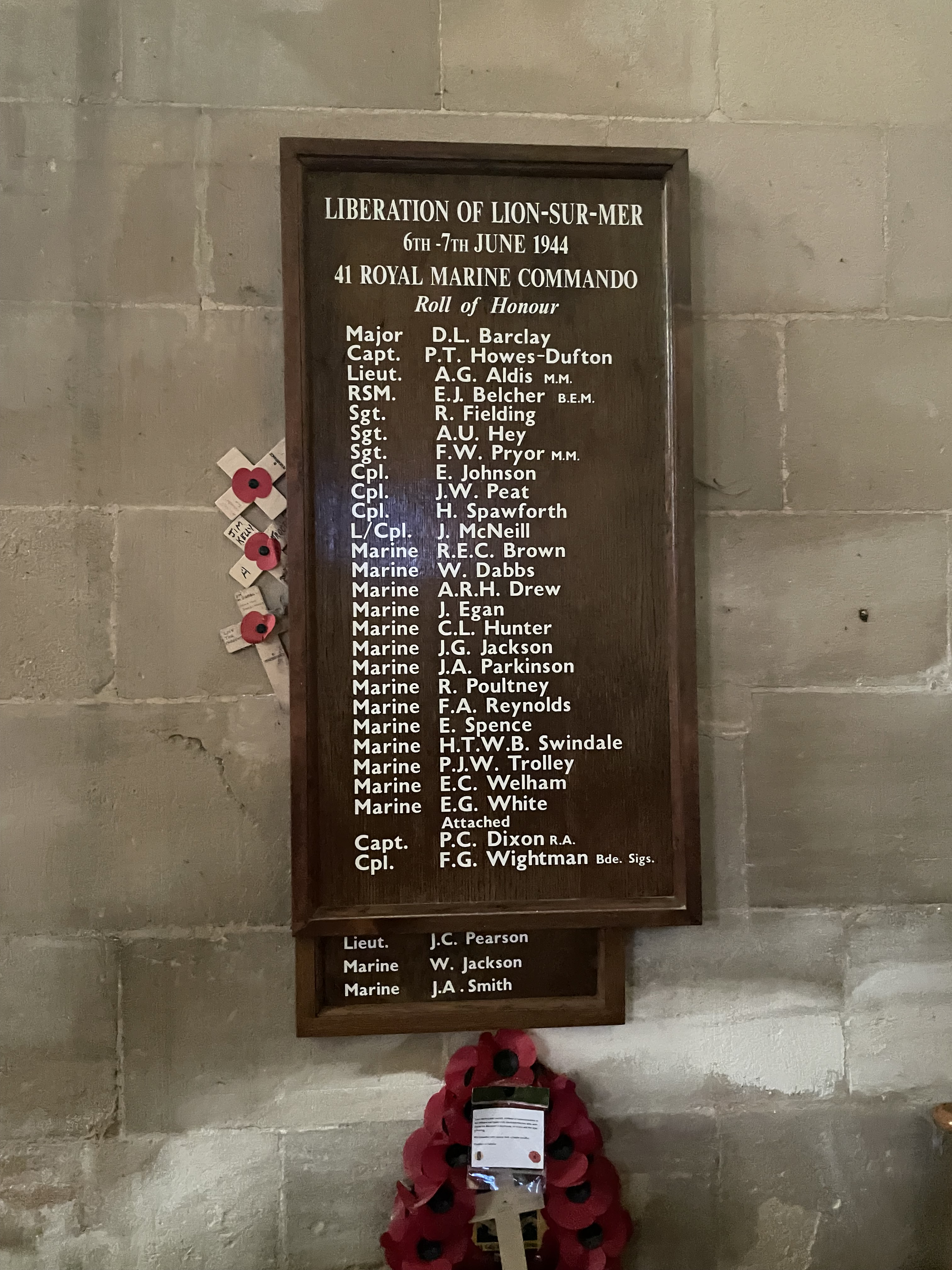
D-Day memorial plaque in Église Saint-Pierre in Lion-sur-Mer, France

The early British Commando units in the Second World War were all from the British Army but in February 1942, the Royal Marines were asked to organise Commando units of their own, and 6,000 men volunteered.

'B' (RM) Commando was raised at Pembroke Dock on 7 October 1942, under the command of Lieutenant Colonel P W O'H Phibbs, from the men of the 8th Royal Marine Battalion. It was the second Royal Marine commando battalion formed after its sister 'A' (RM) Commando. Both commandos were based on the Isle of Wight and soon after the commando was renamed No. 41 (Royal Marine) Commando. It fought with the Special Service Brigade in the Allied invasion of Sicily and later during the Salerno landings, where they suffered heavy casualties including two second-in-commands and most of the Troop Commanders. The Unit's Chaplain, the Revd John Wallis RN, was awarded the DSC for "outstanding courage and devotion to duty shown ... in tending the wounded and bringing in casualties under heavy fire from the Enemy". The Medical Officer, Surg Lt Ernest Davies was also awarded the DSC for bravery and devotion to the wounded. The Unit returned to the United Kingdom in January 1944, in preparation for the Normandy landings. It was part of the 4th Special Service Brigade and landed at Normandy on the west of Sword Beach on 6 June 1944, D-Day, and then took part in the capture of Douvres Radar Station on 17 June. It later took part in the battle of the Scheldt in November 1944. It then served on the Meuse (Maas) for the remainder of the war and then occupation duties in Germany. On 20 January 1946, 41 Commando was disbanded.

=== 41 (Independent) Commando ===
During the Korean War 41 Commando was reconstituted as 41 (Independent) Commando following a request from the United Nations Command for more amphibious raiding forces. The "Independent" designation meant that their commander had sole responsibility for their unit and did not have to consult with higher headquarters on operational and logistical matters. On 16 August 1950 219 Royal Marine volunteers were assembled in RM Bickleigh, then the Commando School. They were commanded by Lieutenant Colonel Douglas B. Drysdale DSO, MBE an experienced World War II Commando veteran who was the Chief Instructor at the Royal Marines Officer school.

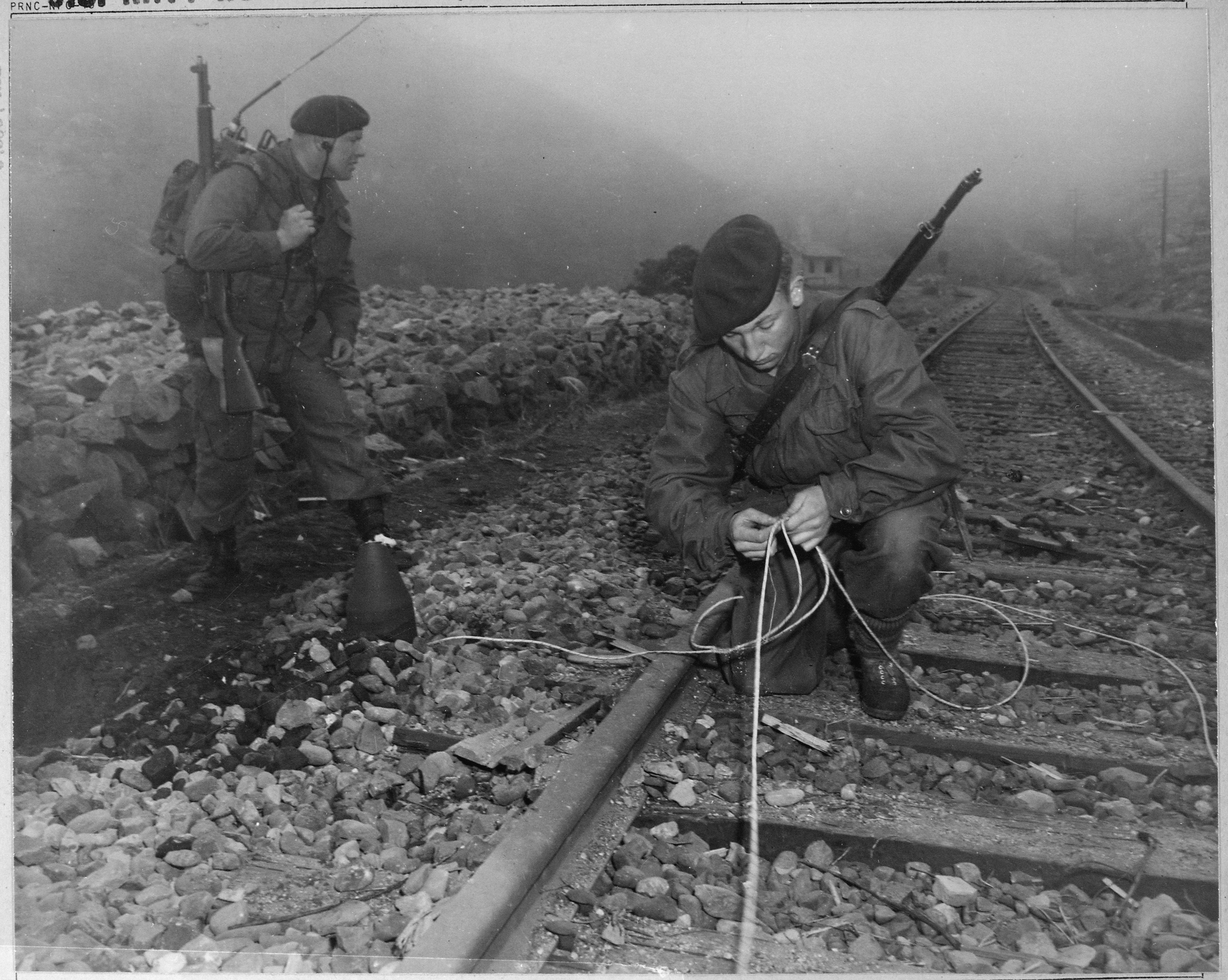
Marines of 41 Independent Commandos plant demolition charges on a railway line in Korea.

The Commandos travelled to Japan in civilian clothes, with most of the civilian clothing issued by the Admiralty. The unit received more volunteers en route from 3 Commando Brigade involved in the Malayan Emergency. Arriving in Japan on 15 September 1950, the Commandos were issued American winter uniforms and weapons but retained their green berets, battle dress and boots. The first mission of the unit was in October where the Commandos embarked on two American high speed transports the USS Horace A. Bass (APD-124) and USS Wantuck (APD-125) supported by the destroyer USS De Haven (DD-727), where they executed a series of raids on the North Korean coast near Wonsan to disrupt North Korean transportation facilities.

On 10 November 1950, 41 (Independent) Commando joined the United Nations advance in North Korea where they served with the United States Marine Corps; the second time the two organisations had served together, the first being the Boxer Rebellion. During the Battle of Chosin Reservoir Lt. Col. Drysdale was given command of a 900-man unit of his own Commando, American, and South Korean forces called Task Force Drysdale. Their hard fighting together with the American Marines and Army led to 41 Independent Commando being awarded the American Presidential Unit Citation that the 1st Marine Division earned. However it was not awarded until 1957.

The Commando reformed in Japan and in April 1951 were assigned to what eventually became the 1st Commonwealth Division. They raided the North Korean coast with the Republic of Korea Marine Corps until 41 Commando returned to England in December 1951; those who had served less than a year in the commando were drafted into 42 Commando operating in Malaya. They were disbanded on 2 February 1952, the Commando having 31 Marines killed and 17 captured with one Royal Marine defecting to North Korea, who returned to the UK in 1960.

=== Post Korean War ===
In 1960 41 Commando was reformed as part of the United Kingdom's Strategic Reserve. The Commando served in various places throughout the world. These included East Africa in 1964, while in 1969 they were the first RM Commando to participate in operations in Northern Ireland. In 1971 they were stationed in Malta and in 1974 together with 40 Commando they took part in United Nations operations in Cyprus following the Turkish invasion. In 1977 they left Malta and reformed in Royal Marines Barracks Deal, Kent. Besides two tours in NI (1978 - Springfield/Falls Rd; and 1980 - South Armargh), the unit carried out public duties in London in 1979 and served as part of the United Nations Peacekeeping Force in Cyprus. In 1981 41 Commando Royal Marines disbanded again.

== Battle honours ==
The following Battle honours were awarded to the British Commandos during the Second World War.

- Adriatic
- Alethangyaw
- Aller
- Anzio
- Argenta Gap
- Burma 1943–45
- Crete
- Dieppe
- Dives Crossing
- Djebel Choucha
- Flushing
- Greece 1944–45
- Italy 1943–45
- Kangaw
- Landing at Porto San Venere
- Landing in Sicily
- Leese
- Litani
- Madagascar
- Middle East 1941, 1942, 1944
- Monte Ornito
- Myebon
- Normandy Landing
- North Africa 1941–43
- North-West Europe 1942, 1944–1945
- Norway 1941
- Pursuit to Messina
- Rhine
- St. Nazaire
- Salerno
- Sedjenane 1
- Sicily 1943
- Steamroller Farm
- Syria 1941
- Termoli
- Vaagso
- Valli di Comacchio
- Westkapelle

== Award in Korean War ==
- Presidential Unit Citation
