= No. 46 (Royal Marine) Commando =

- Cap badge of the Royal Marines.
- Active: 1 August 1943 – 31 January 1946
- Country: United Kingdom
- Branch: Royal Marines
- Type: Commando
- Role: Coastal raiding force Assault Infantry
- Size: Battalion
- Part of: 4th Special Service Brigade
- Nickname: Four Six
- Motto: Per Mare Per Terram (By Sea By Land) (Latin)
- March: Quick – A Life on the Ocean Wave; Slow – Preobrajensky

Commanders
- Notable commanders: Campbell Hardy

Insignia
- Combined Operations Shoulder Patch

No. 46 (Royal Marine) Commando was a battalion size formation of the Royal Marines, part of the British Commandos, formed in August 1943 during the Second World War. The Commando was assigned to the 4th Special Service Brigade and served in North-west Europe and took part in the D-Day landings, as well as operations around Ostend and Antwerp, before being disbanded after the war in January 1946.

== Background ==
The British Commandos were formed in 1940 by the order of Winston Churchill, the British Prime Minister. He called for specially trained troops that would "develop a reign of terror down the enemy coast". At first, they were a small force of volunteers who carried out small raids against enemy-occupied territory, but by 1943, their role had changed into lightly equipped assault infantry, which specialise in spearheading amphibious landings.

The man selected as the overall commander of the force was Admiral Sir Roger Keyes, himself a veteran of the landings at Galipoli and the Zeebrugge raid in the First World War. Initially the Commandos were a British Army formation, the first Royal Marines Commando was formed in 1942. The Royal Marine Commandos, like all British Army Commandos, went through the six-week intensive commando course at Achnacarry. The course in the Scottish Highlands concentrated on fitness, speed marches, weapons training, map reading, climbing, small-boat operations and demolitions, both by day and by night.

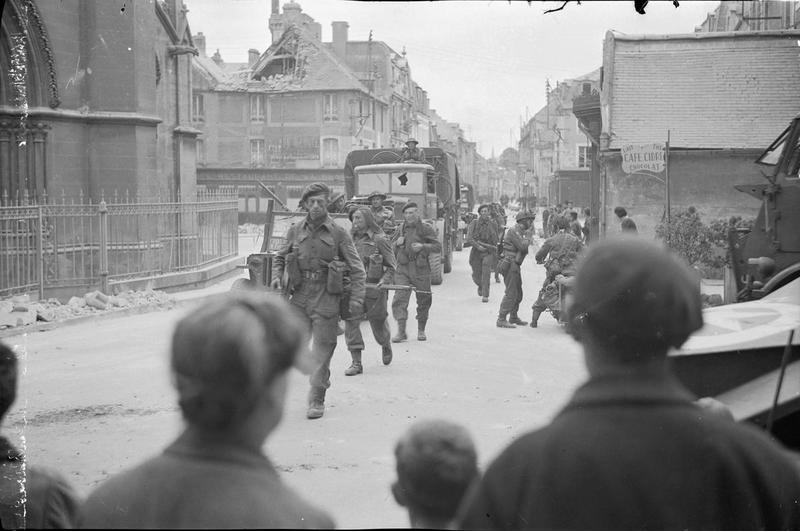
Men of No. 46 (Royal Marine) Commando entering the village of Douvres-la-Delivrande, France, 8 June 1944, watched by French civilians.

No. 46 (Royal Marine) Commando was formed in August 1943, under the command of Lieutenant Colonel Campbell Hardy as part of the conversion of the Royal Marines Division into commandos. Following training, it was allocated to the 1st Special Service Brigade. It took part in the Normandy landings of 6 June 1944, serving on the Orne River bridgehead alongside the British 6th Airborne Division. It suffered heavy casualties in Normandy and at the end of September 1944, was returned to the United Kingdom to refit. Returning to mainland Europe in January 1945, it was the Antwerp guard force. The commandos then participated in a number of assault river crossings during the advance into Germany. At the end of the war, the commandos took part in the occupation of Germany before being disbanded in February 1946.

No. 46 (Royal Marine) Commando was disbanded after the Second World War. The Royal Marine Commando tradition is today continued by 3 Commando Brigade and its units.

== Battle honours ==
The following Battle honours were awarded to the British Commandos during the Second World War.

- Adriatic
- Alethangyaw
- Aller
- Anzio
- Argenta Gap
- Burma 1943–45
- Crete
- Dieppe
- Dives Crossing
- Djebel Choucha
- Flushing
- Greece 1944–45
- Italy 1943–45
- Kangaw
- Landing at Porto San Venere
- Landing in Sicily
- Leese
- Litani
- Madagascar
- Middle East 1941, 1942, 1944
- Monte Ornito
- Myebon
- Normandy Landing
- North Africa 1941–43
- North-West Europe 1942, 1944–1945
- Norway 1941
- Pursuit to Messina
- Rhine
- St. Nazaire
- Salerno
- Sedjenane 1
- Sicily 1943
- Steamroller Farm
- Syria 1941
- Termoli
- Vaagso
- Valli di Comacchio
- Westkapelle
