= Operation Devon =

1943 Allied amphibious landing in Italy

- Part of the Italian campaign of World War II
Date	3–6 October 1943
Location	Termoli, Italy 42.00°N 14.98°E
Result	Allied victory

Belligerents
United Kingdom	Germany

Commanders and leaders
(United Kingdom) Harold Alexander (United Kingdom) John Durnford-Slater (United Kingdom) Vyvyan Evelegh	(Nazi Germany) Albert Kesselring (Nazi Germany) Rudolf Sieckenius

Strength
650: assault force (commandos); 5000–8,000: relief force	383–600: initial defenders (Kampfgruppe Rau); 1,750–2,500: counterattack (two and a half battalions, 16. Panzer Division and elements of paratroop Kampfgruppe Schulz)

Casualties and losses
Assault force: 32 killed, 85 wounded and 23 missing; Relief force: unknown	Unknown
- Location within Italy

Operation Devon was the code name of an amphibious landing by British Commandos in 1943 at Termoli, on the Adriatic coast of Italy, during the Italian Campaign of World War II.

== Landing ==
Devon was launched on 3 October 1943, as part of the attack on the Volturno Line, and was undertaken by No. 3 Commando, No. 40 (Royal Marine) Commando and the Special Raiding Squadron under 2nd Special Service Brigade. It was later reinforced by two brigades and a battalion of a third, all from the British 78th Infantry Division.

In the early hours of 3 October 1943, 3 and 40 Commandos and the SRS landed behind the German lines under cover of darkness at Termoli, a seaport town on the Adriatic coast, north of the Biferno River. 40 Commando penetrated well into the town before the Germans were alerted.

There was brisk close-quarter fighting with German paratroopers from Kampfgruppe Rau – a defensive detachment made up of one Fallschirmjäger Pioneer (paratroop engineer) platoon, with flak, transport and other support units from 1. Fallschirmjäger Division.

By around 08:00 hours, the commandos had captured the town and controlled the approaches. So complete was the surprise that the kampfgruppe commander, Major Rau, was wearing pyjamas when captured, and German vehicles and motorcyclists drove into a commando ambush position until around noon.

Elements of the 78th Division, and tanks rushed from the 3 County of London Yeomanry and Canadian Three Rivers Regiment, had arrived to reinforce the commandos by the time German forces counter-attacked in strength: two and a half understrength battalions from 16. Panzer Division and some paratroopers of Kampfgruppe Schulz. The British held off repeated counter-attacks until 6 October. By noon on the 6th the reinforcements had stabilised the situation, and by evening on the 6th the enemy was in full retreat.

== Aftermath ==
The operation was a success. It had won a valuable harbour and the assault force had repelled all counterattacks. Devon subsequently caused German forces to withdraw from the natural defence line on the Biferno and denied them use of an important lateral road from Naples, thereby forcing them to retreat further northwards.

The operation had been a costly one for the commandos, however. Between them they lost three officers and 29 other ranks (ORs) killed, seven officers and 78 ORs wounded, and one officer and 22 ORs missing.
