= Cardigan Bay (disambiguation) =

Cardigan Bay is a bay in Wales.

Cardigan Bay may also refer to:

- Cardigan Bay (horse), a New Zealand pacer
- HMS Cardigan Bay (K630), a Bay-class anti-aircraft frigate of the Royal Navy 1945–1961
- RFA Cardigan Bay (L3009), a logistics ship of the United Kingdom's Royal Fleet Auxiliary
- Cardigan Bay, Prince Edward Island, a bay in Prince Edward Island, Canada
