= Guy de Montlaur =

French painter

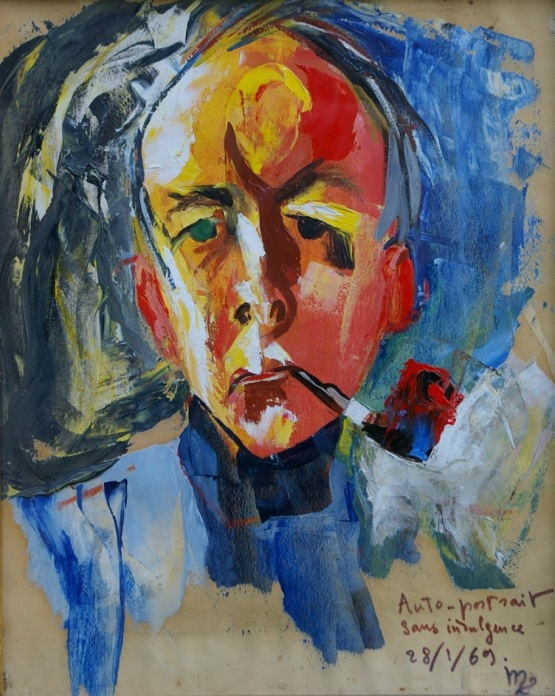
- Autoportrait sans indulgence (1969)
- Born: 9 September 1918; Biarritz
- Died: 10 August 1977 (aged 58); Garches, Paris
- Education: Académie Julian
- Known for: Painter
- Movement: Cubism/Expressionism
- Military career
- Allegiance: France
- Branch: French Army; Free French Naval Commandos
- Service years: 1938-1945
- Rank: Capitaine de Corvette
- Units: 3e Régiment de Hussards; 15è Groupe de Reconnaissance de Corps d’Armée; 1er Bataillon de Fusiliers Marins Commandos
- Conflicts: Battle of France; Normandy landings; Operation Infatuate
- Awards: Legion d'Honneur
- Website: montlaur.net

Guy Joseph Marie de Villardi comte de Montlaur (9 September 1918, Biarritz — 10 August 1977, Garches) was a French painter from the Languedoc family of Montlaur.

He was a resistance fighter in WW2, he landed in Normandy on 6 June 1944 with the 1er BFMC troops (aka "Kieffer Commandos"), he participated in the Battle of Normandy and landed again in Holland on 1 November 1944.

Montlaur's paintings were influenced by the great classical works such as those by Paolo Uccello, Ingres, Delacroix and later Kandinsky. One can define four styles characterising the evolution of Montlaur's work: cubism immediately post-war, geometric abstraction from 1949, abstract expressionism from 1955 and finally lyrical abstraction around 1960, once he had achieved the summit of his art and technique. His work was often mystical, sometimes religious, and was marked by the terrible memories of his wartime experiences.

== His origins and training ==
Guy de Montlaur was born on 9 September 1918 in Biarritz, from one of the oldest families in the Languedoc, mentioned as early as the 11th century. The Chateau de Montlaur (11th Century) is situated 20 km north east of Montpellier. Guy de Montlaur also had Italian heritage from his Villardi ancestors who were allies of the Visconti and Baroncelli. They settled in Provence at the end of the 13th Century. He had Brazilian ancestors on his mother's side who came from São Paulo and Salvador da Bahia.

His father died when he was a young boy from lingering effects of being gassed in World War I, at which point Montlaur moved to Paris.

He started to paint at a young age. Between 1936 and 1938 while studying literature and philosophy at the Sorbonne he was a regular at Emmanuel Fougerat's studio and then at the Academie Julian. He worked with Jean Souverbie and accompanied him to the World's Fair of 1937 at the Palais de Chaillot.

In 1937, he met a young American woman also studying art, Adelaide Oates, he married her six years later. In 1938, just after the Munich Agreement he left for his military service.

== The soldier ==
Guy de Montlaur was at the front at the onset of the war on 3 September 1939. He was with the 3rd Regiment of the Hussards based at Sarreguemines, regrouped in the 15th Groupe de Reconnaissance de Corps d'Armée and took part from the start of the war in numerous raids in Saarland, Germany (Kleinblittersdorff, Walsheim, Herbitzheim and German Bliesbruck). His unit became part of the Corps Francs from 17 October, he was under the command of Capitaine de Castries, future commander at Dien Bien Phu in 1954. In June 1940, Montlaur was fighting the invasion in a losing battle and ended in Limoges two days after the armistice was conceded by Pétain to Hitler. In 1942, after crossing Franco's Spain, he arrived in Lisbon, where for three months he worked for MI6.

He joined the Free French in London in October 1942. He was assimilated at his request into the 1er Bataillon de Fusiliers Marins Commandos of the Forces Navales Françaises Libres. On 6 June 1944 he landed in Normandy at Ouistreham with the 177 French of Commando Kieffer integrated into the 4th Commando of the 1st Special Service Brigade of Brigadier General Lord Lovat.

Guy Vourc'h was the troop commander at the D-Day landings and made the following comment in his eulogy for Guy de Montlaur on 13 August 1977 at the cemetery of Ranville (Calvados):

"I saw him when he arrived early 1943. I offered him the chance to join the Commandos which were the modern equivalent of the cavalry, an arm used for reconnaissance and lightly armed bold raids. From that time onward, we were always together. First as group leaders, then as section leaders, training together with Commandant Kieffer, Lofi, Hattu, Chausse, Bégot, and Wallerand, we built up together an instrument of attack, which had the honour of being chosen as first to land, here, on our native soil of France. When all the officers of my company were wounded, it was Guy de Montlaur who took over in command. Later, at Flushing and Walcheren, wounded as he was near me, he refused to be evacuated. His courage was close to insolence; he was not just fighting but humiliating the enemy: by the age of 25 he had received seven citations for valour in battle ("Croix de Guerre") and the French Légion d’Honneur."

On 1 November 1944, he took part in the allied landings of Flushing on the Isle of Walcheren in Holland (Operation Infatuate) where he was wounded when his barge was hit by a German shell. The operation was led against an enemy ten times greater in numbers than the Allies, and was a total success. It opened the Scheldt river to the allied troops and allowed them access to the port of Antwerp and northern Germany, opening the road to Berlin and leading to the end of the war.

Montlaur is mentioned by Cornelius Ryan in his book The Longest Day and his role was played by Georges Rivière in the 1962 film adaptation.

== The Artist ==
After the war, Montlaur and his wife Adelaide left for the United States, he studied at the Art Students League of New York and painted feverishly. After two years in the US, he returned to France where he would live until his death.

=== The Cubist Period ===
Montlaur's paintings faithfully followed the cubists rules of the group "Golden Section" (Gleizes, Metzinger, Gris, Léger, and Duchamp). He was inspired by the principles laid out by Gino Severini (a friend of his) in his book Du Cubisme au Classicisme, where colours are determined in an almost mathematical formula.

Montlaur was prolific during this period, he demonstrated rigour, as well as accuracy and precision of his eye and hand. Montlaur returned to France in 1948 and moved to Nice until 1953. He spent his time between Nice and Paris where he found his friends, members of the dynamic group Réalités Nouvelles (Atlan, Poliakoff, Schneider, Chapoval, and Soulages). Montlaur's first solo exhibition was in March 1949 at the Galerie Lucienne-Léonce Rosenberg. The Museum of Modern Art of the City of Paris bought one of his works at this exhibition.

=== Geometric Abstraction ===
In 1949, the Galerie René Drouin edited the translation of the Vassily Kandinsky's Du Spirituel dans l'art et dans la peinture en particulier (Über das Geistige in der Kunst). Kandinsky's paintings and ideas become models for Montlaur. In October 1949, at the 16th Salon des Surindépendants, Montlaur exhibits his first abstract painting La Baie des Anges (1949).

In a letter to Montlaur dated 6 January 1950, Gino Severini wrote:

"I am sure that this period of abstraction is useful to you. But always leave the door open."

Montlaur exhibited for a second time at the Salon des Surindépendants, but finding that their style did not correspond to his, he moved to the Réalités Nouvelles where he exhibited until 1958 alongside Atlan, Chapoval, Soulages, Schneider, Kupka, Vasarely, Herbin, Nell Blaine, Ellsworth Kelly, Jacques Duthoo, Poliakoff (peintre)|Nicolas Poliakoff...

Montlaur exhibited at the Galerie Colette Allendy in 1951 and 1954. This gallery was founded by the widow of Dr. René Allendy who had prefaced Severini's book "From Cubisme to Classicisme".

According to the art critic Michel Ragon, "all viable new work is exhibited by Madame Colette Allendy." Colette Allendy also exhibited work by Hartung, Soulages, Mathieu, Stahly, Wols, Corneille, Bryen, Doucet, Schneider, del Marle. The art critic Roger van Gindertael wrote:

"We see a young man like Guy de Montlaur wanting to escape from the lack of strength of formalism, whose syntax had achieved a dangerous level of perfection and let loose on this order the power of disruptive but beneficial expressions, because they open doors for other rhythms and arrangements (Galerie Colette Allendy)."

=== Expressionist Abstraction ===
In 1953, Montlaur and his family settled in Fontainebleau.

His painting became more geometric and more linear. It moved away from Kandinsky and Severini, and lost its allegiance to the neo-constructivism of the Réalités Nouvelles. Montlaur exchanged the paintbrush for the knife and palette. He broke away from form and contours. His paintings took on a fantastical, dreamlike, disconcerting aspect. One sees the intimate relationship with his favourite poets: Baudelaire, Verlaine, Nerval (the title of the painting Divertissement pour une nuit de janvier, 1955, makes reference to Nerval's death on 26 January 1855). Valery and especially Guillaume Apollinaire accompanied him during his war years: he had Alcools in his bag when he landed on 6 June 1944. The book had traces of sea water on it. His lucidity and intransigence meant he wanted to expose the truth at any price, alone against everyone.

His friend Albert Béguin tells him in a letter dated 1957:

"Now you show your true violent nature."

In May 1956, Guy de Montlaur finally moved to Paris with Adelaide and their children.

=== Lyrical Abstraction ===
Montlaur was wounded to the face by shell fragments at the landings of Walcheren and these are painful and prevent him from sleeping. The doctors were not able to operate to remove the multiple fragments of tungsten that were lodged in his eye. Montlaur attempted to transcend his physical and emotional pain by increasing his creative activity. His painting became mystical (La chute de l'ange, 1960) and expressed an intimate inner spiritual battle.

In 1961, Montlaur returned to serving in the navy, first with the Bataillon de Joinville, then in 1963, at the Service Historique de la Marine, in Paris. He devoted all his energy to his work, to the detriment of his art. For nine years, he painted at night, at weekends, and during the family holidays in Brittany. Paradoxically, these short moments of tranquility saw an explosion in his productivity.

His painting became more and more obscure to the outsider, but he always left clues. It is by painting that he attempted to overcome despair, but the paintings themselves are desperate. He wrote about his painting Voici venir l'automne, 1961:

"Only a touch of dark rose madder could warm up such a landscape of metal. The sharp blue of a pale clear sky; the steely hue of streams and roads; the trees chiseled by the hard frost: aIl this requires a bloody corpse. Let a hand with sharp claws tear from my chest this heart, red and hot, and throw it in the winter woods: now my picture is composed. It is right as it should be. It is to winter that my heart belongs."

(Guy de Montlaur, Petits écrits de nuit.)

A tragic episode affected Montlaur greatly in the summer of 1966. The vehicle in which he was a passenger, was involved in a road traffic accident with a young boy. Montlaur comforted the boy in his agony. The accident brought back to the fore all the unbearable experiences of the war. His paintings during August 1966 express his misery (Du sang sur la route, Cauchemar d'une nuit d'été, A la mémoire de ma tante, tuée à Ravensbruck).

Montlaur had declared Paolo Ucello and Vassili Kandinsky to be his masters, this is how he described himself in 1971 during his exhibition at the Galerie des Editions Rolf Lutz, quai Voltaire, Paris:

"He looks at the world with a somewhat skeptical eye because he knows that the utility of things doesn’t matter much. What really matters is the mysterious manner in which forms and colours organize themselves inescapably. Nothing is motionless in what he sees. He never stops marveling at what is being born under his hand. The only thing he knows is that he is the medium between the mystery which wraps him and this new painting he would not have dreamed of previously."

(Guy de Montlaur, Petits écrits de nuit).

Pierre Vintéjoux wrote in Le Figaro at the time of the exhibition at the Galerie Rolf Lutz:

"Over the course of recent paintings, the lyrical verve, often unbridled by the past, has attained a rigour without lessening the liberty of expression that is dear to Montlaur. A new vigour constrains the fluid graphic work and it is helped by the contrasts of the colours that are carefully ordered, with a sort of humour, dark, but always enlivening."

Robert Vrinat, in Nouveaux Jours:

"The galerie Editions Rolf Lutz, 15bis quai Voltaire is presenting the recent works of Montlaur, who is rarely seen. Thus each exhibition shows a distinct step in his artistic journey. He remains faithful to his original nature, but moves forwards in the search for expression that is both lyrical and technical and which requires above all faith in the subject matter, the song of colours, the movement of the forms created by the gesture and touch. What remains is a quality of structure and of life without which nothing could be said of the essence of his deep meditation. Silvagni, who wrote his preface, advises us that his painting is born from a meditation on death, and also of the revolt of man. In the execution of the work, in parallel to the development of each painting, appears in the spirit of the painter, a psychic equivalent, a state of mind which dictates to him the title of the work (The battle of Jacob and the angel, Death of a poet, O my love, Reminescere etc.). Large movements contrasted with red, white etched with black (for example) are a searing explosion on a rhythm of composition without weakness. With this in mind, and with this talent, the abstraction is no longer a part or aspect of the painting, to contain it entirely with its qualities, its efficiencies, its captivation."

=== His last years ===
In 1974, Montlaur purchased a property near Lisieux, in Normandy, according to him, to get closer to the region that had so affected him since 1944. He spent his last years between Paris and Normandy dedicated entirely to his painting.

"I want to shout: ‘Just look! Look at this mystery! It pierces the eyes!’ And nobody sees it. Nobody but me. People see colours, shadows, lights, forms. They see (but what do I know what they really see?) the canvas, the stretcher nails. And I don't understand why they can't guess at all the distress here, right in front of them, as it was during the war: the noise, death, love, betrayal; the lies, and the fear. And still more that I cannot say, but I know how to do it. Yes I say: ‘I know how to do it’."

(Guy de Montlaur, Petits écrits de nuit)

Guy de Montlaur died on 10 August 1977 at Garches.

He is buried with his wife Adelaide, at Ranville cemetery in Normandy. He lies near his commando comrades, including the chaplain of Commando Kieffer, René de Naurois, Righteous Among the Nations, who married him and Adelaide on 21 August 1943 in London.

== Exhibitions ==
- 1937 : Salon des Artistes Français, Paris.
- 1949 : Galerie Lucienne-Léonce Rosenberg, Paris.
- 1949-1950 : Salon des Surindépendants, Paris.
- 1951 and 1954 : Galerie Colette Allendy, Paris.
- 1951 : 3rd Exhibition Art Club, Hotel Negresco, Nice.
- 1950-1958 : Salon des Réalités Nouvelles, Paris.
- 1959 : Comité France-Amérique, Paris.
- 1971 : Galerie Rolf Lutz, Paris.
- 1993 : Montgomery Gallery, San Francisco.
- 1994 : La Maison française de l'ambassade de France, Washington DC
- 2012 : Memorial Pegasus and Ranville City Hall Library, Normandy, France.
- 2012 : Chateau de La Thibaudière Orangery, Anjou, France, on National Heritage Day.
- 2013-2014 : Chateau de Montlaur, Hérault, France.
- 2014 : Memorial Pegasus, Ranville, Normandy.
- 2015 : Memorial Pegasus, Ranville, Normandy, France. Permanent exhibition of "Pegasus before landing" donated to the museum.
- 2015 : Perm State Art Gallery, Perm, Federation of Russia.
- 2016 : Exhibition Hall of the Union of Artists of Russia, Chelyabinsk, Federation of Russia.
- 2016 : Poklewski-Koziell House, Sverdlovsk Regional Museum Yekaterinburg, Federation of Russia.
- 2016 : Union of Exhibition Halls of Moscow, Gallery "Na Kashirke", Moscow, Federation of Russia.
- 2016 : The Institut Français in Russia "", Moscow, Federation of Russia.
- 2016 : "Soldier and Painter", Gallery "Exposed", Shabolovka, Moscow, Federation of Russia. Exhibition organised by "Boogie Gallery".
- 2017 : World Art Dubai 2017, Dubai World Trade Centre, Dubai. Exhibition organised by "Boogie Gallery".
- 2017 : Restaurant Med' ("Медь"), Tverskaya, Moscow, Federation of Russia. Exhibition organised by "Boogie Gallery".
- 2017 : St Regis Hotel, Nikolskaya, Moscow, Federation of Russia. Exhibition organised by "Boogie Gallery".
- 2018 : State Institute for Art Studies (SIAS), Moscow, Federation of Russia / Государственный институт искусствознания Министерства культуры РФ (ГИИ).
- 2019 : "In Memory of What I Cannot Say", The National WWII Museum, New Orleans, USA .
- 2019 : "Guy de Montlaur (1918-1977) It was a Strange War", IESA art & culture and University Paris 8, Paris.
- 2023 : "Guy de Montlaur From Kieffer Commandos to expressionist painting"Guy de Montlaur, des Commandos Kieffer à la peinture expressionniste Guy de Montlaur, grand soldat et peintre, honoré à Limoges, Musée de la Résistance et de la Déportation de Limoges, Limoges, France.
