= 352nd Infantry Division =

352nd Infantry Division 352nd Volksgrenadier Division
- German: 352. Infanterie-Division; 352. Volksgrenadier-Division
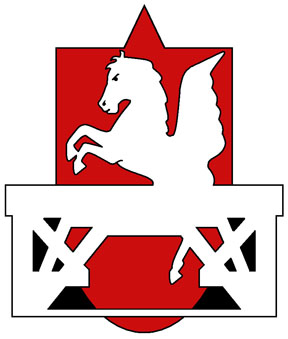
- Unit insignia
- Active: November 1943 – 8 May 1945
- Country: Nazi Germany
- Branch: Army
- Type: Infantry
- Size: Division
- Engagements: D-Day; Battle of the Bulge

Commanders
- Notable commanders: Dietrich Kraiss

The 352nd Infantry Division (German: 352. Infanterie-Division) was an infantry division of the German Army during World War II. Deployed on the Western Front, the division defended Omaha Beach on D-Day, 6 June 1944. In late 1944, the division was reassembled as the 352nd Volksgrenadier Division (German: 352. Volksgrenadier-Division).

== History ==
=== Formation and strengths ===
The 352nd Infantry Division was formed in occupied France in early November 1943; this followed the German High Command order issued in September that year to raise ten new infantry divisions to replace losses on the Eastern Front. These new divisions were to be combat ready by May 1944. The 352nd was placed under the command of Generalleutnant Dietrich Kraiss. Once up to strength and trained, the 352nd was expected to transfer to the Eastern Front, however there was no clear timetable or confirmation of that deployment and by March 1944, with the threat of an Allied invasion in the West, the 352nd received orders to prepare for the defence of the Atlantic Wall, in the Normandy area. The 352nd, when formed, was a mix of experienced soldiers drawn from worn-out or disbanded divisions that had served on the Eastern front, young German conscripts and a significant number of Ost volunteers, the latter mainly employed in divisional support roles.

With the Normandy coastal area extending 100 km, Field Marshal Rommel made the decision to split the area in half, by providing the static 716th Division with a shortened 47 km long 'Caen zone', (supported by the 21st Panzer Division) and deploying the 352nd Infantry Division to defend the 53 km long 'Bayeux zone' (bringing the 352nd in between the 709th Division and the 716th Division). Even with the benefit of all the fortifications under construction, this frontage was still far beyond what was considered prudent in German tactical doctrine. This led to a number of disagreements between Rommel, Dietrich Kraiss and the Corps Commander on how best to deploy the Grenadier Regiments of the 352nd. In the end it was decided that two infantry regiments would be stationed forward, and one infantry regiment would be left in reserve. However, the Regimental Commands were disrupted as some battalions were operating independently.

On the divisional right flank just south of Bayeux, Grenadier Regiment 915, (with 2 battalions) were positioned as a counterattack reserve, along with the Fusilier battalion. On the divisional left flank the 2nd Battalion of Grenadier Regiment 914 was positioned behind the gun emplacement at Pointe du Hoc. In the centre of the Divisional area was the 2nd Battalion of Grenadier Regiment 916, defending Omaha beach. The self-propelled anti tank battalion were positioned between the left and centre Divisional areas, in reserve. The 1st Battalion of GR 916 were deployed to the 716th Division’s defence sector and would oppose the British in the western area of Gold Beach.

=== D-Day ===
The 352nd began its coastal duty by improving the beach obstacles, emplacing mined stakes and timber structures. This involved not only cutting and hauling timber from miles inland, but also driving stakes and piles deep into the sand. The first band of obstacles – about 250 yards (750 ft) out from the waterline at high tide – consisted of 'Belgian Gates' – reinforced iron frames with supports that were built atop rollers. Next came a band of mined stakes and log ramps, meant to tear the bottoms out of landing craft or tip them over. Finally, there was a row of metal obstacles, including 'hedgehogs', made of steel rails. Although the Germans had attached mines to many of the obstacles, few of them were waterproofed, and corrosion had long since taken its toll of many of the explosive devices.

By June 1944, many of the coastal strongpoints in their sector were still being manned by personnel from the 726th Infantry Regiment, of the neighboring 716th Division. As a tradeoff, one infantry battalion from the 352nd Division was placed under the command of the 716th Division to help shore up their defenses. In the 'Bayeux zone', 914th regiment was stationed in the west, 916th regiment was stationed in the east, while 915th regiment was in reserve to the south. The soldiers of the 916th and 726th Regiments occupied slit trenches, eight concrete bunkers, 35 pillboxes, six mortar pits, sites for 35 Nebelwerfer, (multi-barrel rocket launchers) and 85 machine-gun nests. The defenses were clustered in strongpoints. In the early hours of 6 June the first reports of Allied activity in the 352nd zone came from the Cotentin Peninsula and elements of the 915th Grenadier Regiment were dispatched to investigate, those units manning the defences on the coast also reported large numbers of vessels out to sea, and just before sunrise at 06:00 the allied naval bombardment began, ending 35 minutes later as US tanks and the first wave of infantry landed on the beach to a hail of fire from the heavily fortified strongpoints. Throughout the morning the Americans received heavy casualties on the beach but by 13:00 groups of US soldiers were in possession of key fortifications, had reached some heights overlooking the beach, and opened several beach exits. Just after 15:00 the 916th Grenadier Regiment counterattacked from the Colleville-sur-Mer area but was forced to fall back once again, at around 17:00 the village of St. Laurent-sur-Mer fell to the Americans.

The 916th Grenadier Regiment and a mix of other units either already in place or brought forward throughout the day defended Omaha beach against the landings of the US 1st and 29th Divisions at Omaha Beach, holding the bluffs above the beach for several hours, inflicting heavy casualties, before being overwhelmed. The survivors of the 916 Grenadier battalion along with other units retreated in the morning hours of 7 June after the commander, Colonel Ernst Goth, could no longer hold the positions retaken in the night of 6/7 June.

=== After the invasion ===
The 352nd was shattered in the fighting during June and July 1944, and having taken heavy casualties it was considered by the end of July as no longer capable of operating as a division, the survivors having been amalgamated into various ad-hoc battle groups and other divisions.

It was reformed as the 352nd Volksgrenadier Division on 21 September 1944 near Flensburg as a reconstitution of the 352nd Infantry Division, from the remnants of the original division and the newly created 581st Volksgrenadier Division and fought in the Battle of the Bulge. Thereafter, it fought defensively around Trier and the Moselle until, in mid-March 1945, it was once again considered too weak to operate as an effective division, with remnants escaping across the Rhine at Worms. It was partially reconstituted one last time as a battlegroup in mid-April, and surrendered near Darmstadt.

== Werner Pluskat ==
Major Werner Pluskat, who was featured in Cornelius Ryan's book The Longest Day, and the later movie of the same name, was in the 352nd Artillery (Artillerie Regiment) and fired his guns on Omaha Beach until he ran out of ammunition. He was forward observer on 'WN59 – Resistance Point 59' above the beach on the Eastern flank.

== Order of battle ==
The 352nd's order of battle on the eve of the Allied Invasion was as follows (NB: the artillery component is also shown):

- 914. Grenadier Regiment
  - 2 x 15 cm sIG 33
  - 6 x 7.5 cm leIG
  - 3 x 7.5 cm PaK 40
- 915. Grenadier Regiment
  - 2 x 15 cm sIG 33
  - 6 x 7.5 cm leIG
  - 3 x 7.5 cm PaK 40
- 916. Grenadier Regiment
  - 2 x 15 cm sIG 33
  - 2 x 7.5 cm leIG
  - 3 x 7.5 cm PaK 40
- 352. Panzerjäger Abteilung
  - 14 x Marder II and Marder III variant Panzerjäger
  - 10 x StuG III Ausf. G assault guns
  - 9 x FlaKPanzer 38 Self-Propelled Flak
- 352. Artillerie Regiment
  - 1–9.Batterie – 36 x 10.5 cm leFH 16
  - 10–12.Batterie – 12 x 15 cm sFH 18
- 352. Pioniere Battalion
  - 20 x Flammenwerfer
  - 6 x Granatwerfer
- 352. Fusilier Battalion (1. Kompanie was bicycle mounted)
- Feld-Ersatz Battalion
  - 6 x 8 cm Granatwerfer 34
  - 1 x 5 cm PaK 38
  - 1 x 7.5 cm PaK-40
  - 1 x 10.5 cm Feldhaubitze
  - 1 x Infanterie Geschütz
  - 2 x Flammenwerfer
- Supply Train / Signals Troops
- If organised on Infantry Division, Old Type, lines in 1944, division should number at full strength around 17,200 (excluding attached Fusilier Battalion). The division still retained the old regimental establishment of three battalions (whereas most German Infantry divisions in 1944 had two battalions per regiment). But, these battalions may have been reduced in size, so the strength can vary between 10,971 and the 17,200.

== Sources ==
- Wendel, Marcus (2004). "352. Infanterie-Division".
- "352. Infanterie-Division". German language article at www.lexikon-der-wehrmacht.de. Retrieved 3 April 2005.
- Barbier, Mary (2007). D-day deception: Operation Fortitude and the Normandy invasion. Greenwood Publishing Group. ISBN 978-0-275-99479-2.
- Ramsey, Winston G (1995). D-Day then and now, Volume 1. Battle of Britain Prints International. ISBN 0-900913-84-3.
