= Colin Maud =

Royal Navy officer

Colin Douglas Maud
- In Courseulles with Free French Captain Massignie on Bastille Day, 14 July 1944
- Born: 21 January 1903; Beckenham, Kent, England
- Died: 22 April 1980 (aged 77)
- Military career
- Allegiance: United Kingdom
- Branch: Royal Navy
- Service years: 1921–1956
- Rank: Commodore
- Nickname: "Mad" Maud
- Commands: Amphibious Warfare Centre (1954–56); 4th Minesweeping Flotilla (1951–53); HMS Mull of Galloway (1948–49); HMS Berryhead (1946–47); HMS Cardigan Bay (1945–46); HMS Somali (1942); HMS Icarus (1937–42); HMS Sardonyx (1935–37); HMS H49 (1931–32)
- Conflicts: Second World War: Norwegian campaign; Second Battle of Narvik; Operation Dynamo; Hunt for the Bismark; Operation Gauntlet; Operation Pedestal; Arctic convoys; Normandy landings; Battle of Walcheren Causeway
- Awards: Distinguished Service Order & Bar; Distinguished Service Cross & Bar; Mentioned in Despatches; Commander of the Order of Orange-Nassau (Netherlands)

Commodore Colin Douglas Maud, DSO & Bar, DSC & Bar (21 January 1903 – 22 April 1980) was a Royal Navy officer who during the Second World War commanded the destroyers Somali and Icarus and acted as beach master of Juno Beach at the D-day landings. With a heavy black beard, he "possessed the outward appearance of a latter-day buccaneer and was endowed with exceptional boldness and tenacity to go with it". His blackthorn shillelagh and bulldog Winston provided an image when portrayed by Kenneth More in the film The Longest Day. He was described as "one of the most popular officers in the British Navy".

== Early life and education ==
Maud was born on 21 January 1903, christened Colin Douglas Monkman Maud (according to inscription on his silver christening mug which he gave to his young son, Ruan Maud before the Second World War), and educated at Edgeborough school, Guildford and Britannia Royal Naval College.

== Royal Navy service ==
=== Early career ===
Maud became a midshipman on 15 January 1921 and was appointed to Iron Duke for 2 years. He was promoted to sub-lieutenant in 1924 and completed his Greenwich Lieutenants' course and submarine courses before joining the submarine H26 in 1925. He was promoted to lieutenant in 1925 and joined L25 in April 1927. From 1927 to 1931 he served in the destroyer Wallace and the submarine L21. He became the commanding officer of the submarine H49 in April 1932. He joined the W-class destroyer Woolston in 1932 and by October of the same year was second-in-command of the destroyer Achates. He was promoted to lieutenant commander in 1933.

=== Destroyer command ===
Between July 1935 and early 1937 he commanded the 1919-vintage destroyer Sardonyx before moving in May 1937 to the brand new destroyer Icarus, which operated in the North Sea at the beginning of World War II. On 29 November 1939, in company with the destroyers Kingston and Kashmir, Icarus depth charged and sank the German submarine U-35.

On 3 March 1940, in company with Express, Impulsive and Esk, Maud's Icarus laid a minefield, which claimed U-44 ten days later. On 11 April 1940 Icarus captured the 8,514-ton German supply ship Alster and on 13 April took part in the Second Battle of Narvik. He received a clutch of awards during the summer of 1940: on 28 June 1940 the Distinguished Service Cross, on 11 July 1940 a bar to the same award, "for good services in the Royal Navy since the outbreak of War," and on 16 August 1940 a mention in despatches.

In early May 1941, Maud commanded Icarus during the hunt for Bismarck, escorting the battle cruiser Hood and the battleship Prince of Wales. Poor weather meant that the destroyers were unable to keep up with the capital ships, and when Hood had been sunk, Icarus joined in the search for survivors, of which there were only three.

As commanding officer of Icarus, Maud participated in the evacuation of Dunkirk, in a raid on Spitzbergen, in the Malta convoys and on numerous Atlantic and Russian convoys.

Maud took over as captain of the destroyer Somali in September 1942 when her captain, Jack Eaton, was ill. While covering the return of the Russian convoy PQ-18, Somali was torpedoed by U-703 on 20 September. She was hit in her engine room and although taken under tow by Ashanti, on 25 September heavy weather broke the destroyer's back and she sank. Maud was rescued by Leading Seaman William Goad, who dived into the freezing water with a rope, for which Goad was awarded the Albert Medal. Of the 102 men on board, only 35 were rescued. Maud had spent an hour in the Arctic water and credited his survival to the fact that he had drunk a bottle of whisky after going overboard. As a result, he ordered men under his command to carry a bottle of whisky, which proved to be a popular order. On 1 December 1942 he was awarded the Distinguished Service Order.

=== Normandy beach master ===
Appointed as principal beach master of Juno Beach during the Normandy landings in the rank of acting captain, Maud was responsible for marshalling troops, supplies and equipment through the beach zone, for evacuating casualties and prisoners of war, and for salvaging wrecks and clearing beach obstacles. For conducting these difficult duties under fire and for several weeks afterwards, he was awarded a bar to his Distinguished Service Order.

Eight days after the first landings, Charles de Gaulle and his entourage were met by Maud (who was incongruously wearing shorts) when they landed in France. While de Gaulle met Montgomery, Maud drove Admiral d'Argenlieu, General Kœnig, Gaston Palewski and Colonel Boislambert to Bayeux in his jeep to prepare for de Gaulle's entrance to the city. The preparations included Maud driving round the streets of Bayeux carrying a French Resistance leader shouting "General de Gaulle will speak at four o'clock on the Place du Chateau".

=== Walcheren ===
Maud was appointed as the deputy commander of the Flushing assault force, during the Allied attack on Walcheren Island. On 11 December 1945 he was mentioned in despatches "for distinguished service during the War in Europe".

=== Later career ===
Cardigan Bay, a new Bay-class anti-aircraft frigate, had been intended for the British Pacific Fleet. Maud commanded her from June 1945, taking her through her workup in Scotland but when Japan surrendered, she was sent instead to the Mediterranean Fleet. Maud left her there in October 1946 to take command of Berryhead, a reserve depot ship in Plymouth. Maud was promoted to captain on 30 June 1947. On 25 November 1947 he was granted permission to wear the insignias of a Commander of the Order of Orange-Nassau, which had been conferred upon him by the Queen of the Netherlands in recognition of "services rendered to the Royal Netherlands Navy during the war". From 1948 to 1949 he commanded Mull of Galloway as Senior Officer, Reserve Forces, Clyde area. From April 1949 – May 1951 he was deputy to Rear Admiral James Jefford, serving as the second-in-command of the Royal Pakistan Navy. From 1951 to 1953 he commanded the 4th Minesweeping Flotilla at Harwich, before moving to the Amphibious Warfare HQ as Director Amphibious Warfare (Material). His last appointment in the Royal Navy was as Commandant of the Amphibious Warfare Centre at Fremington, Devon, in the rank of commodore, second class. He retired from the Royal Navy in 1956.

== The Longest Day ==
External videos
- Clip of The Longest Day featuring Kenneth More as Colin Maud on YouTube

In the 1962 movie The Longest Day he was played by Kenneth More (who also served as a British naval officer in the Second World War). Winnie, his dog, was a German Shepherd, and Werner Pluskat already had a dog of the same breed in the film, but Darryl F. Zanuck "improved upon history" by making Winnie an English Bulldog. Maud acted as a technical adviser on the film and provided More with the same shillelagh he had carried on D-Day.

== Family ==
Maud married, first, in 1926 Elizabeth (Betty) Gibson, with whom he had a son Ruan Maud and, secondly, Valerie Compston (née Bocquet), the ex-wife of Vice Admiral Sir Peter Compston, in 1967.

== Death ==
Maud died in 1980 aged 77.
