= The Longest Yarn =

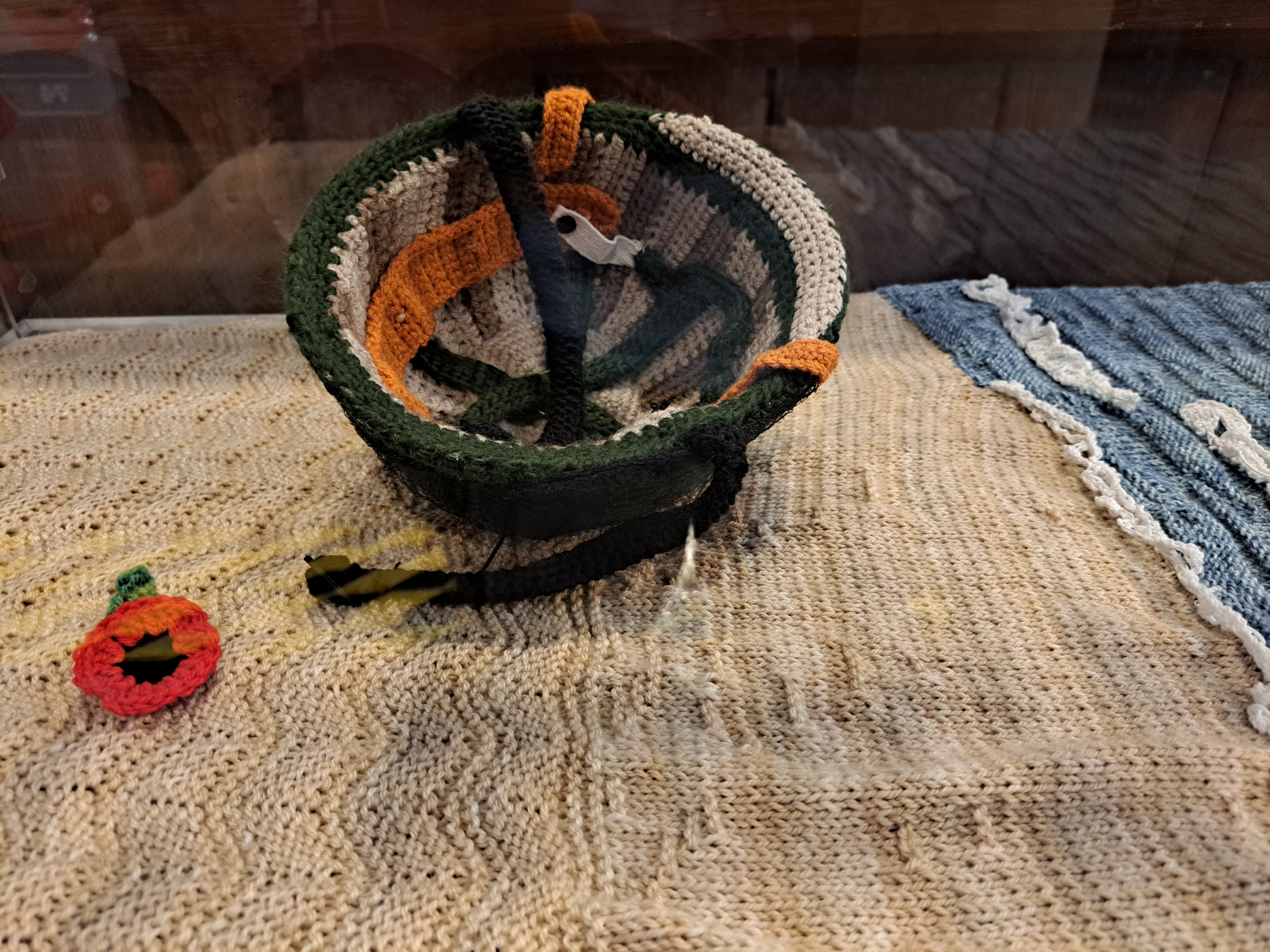
- Helmet on the beach
- Year: 2024
- Dimensions: 80 m (260 ft)
- Website: https://www.thelongestyarn.com/home

The Longest Yarn is an artwork commemorating the 80th anniversary of the Normandy Landings, which took place in 1944. It consists of a number of dioramas created in knitted and crocheted wool. Each diorama represents a scene from the 1962 movie The Longest Day.

There are 80 dioramas - echoing the 80 years that have passed since the landings. Each scene represents what happened during the few days before and on June 6, 1944. Scenes illustrate the doubts and difficulties faced by the allies such as predicting the weather. When the decision to proceed is made men and equipment board ships and aeroplanes, the invasion force crosses the English Channel and fierce fighting takes place to establish allied forces in France.

== Exhibitions ==
The work has been displayed in France and at a number of locations in the United Kingdom, and will visit the United States. The display is included with regular museum admission while at Naval Air Station Wildwood Aviation Museum (USNASW.ORG). Donations to the Longest Yarn will also be accepted and appreciated.

2024

- September: Southwell
- 2–27 October: Holy Trinity Church, Llandudno
- 1 November – 18 November: Royal Garrison Church, Aldershot
- 21 November – 5 December: Stoke Minster
- 7 December – 10 January: Tewkesbury Abbey
- 13 January – 8 February: St Macartin's Cathedral, Enniskillen
- 10 February – 1 March: Norwich University of East Anglia and 2nd Air Division Memorial Library
- 3 March – 1 April: Peterborough Cathedral
- 25 April - 1 September: Naval Air Station Wildwood Aviation Museum l, Cape May, NJ, USA

== Gallery ==
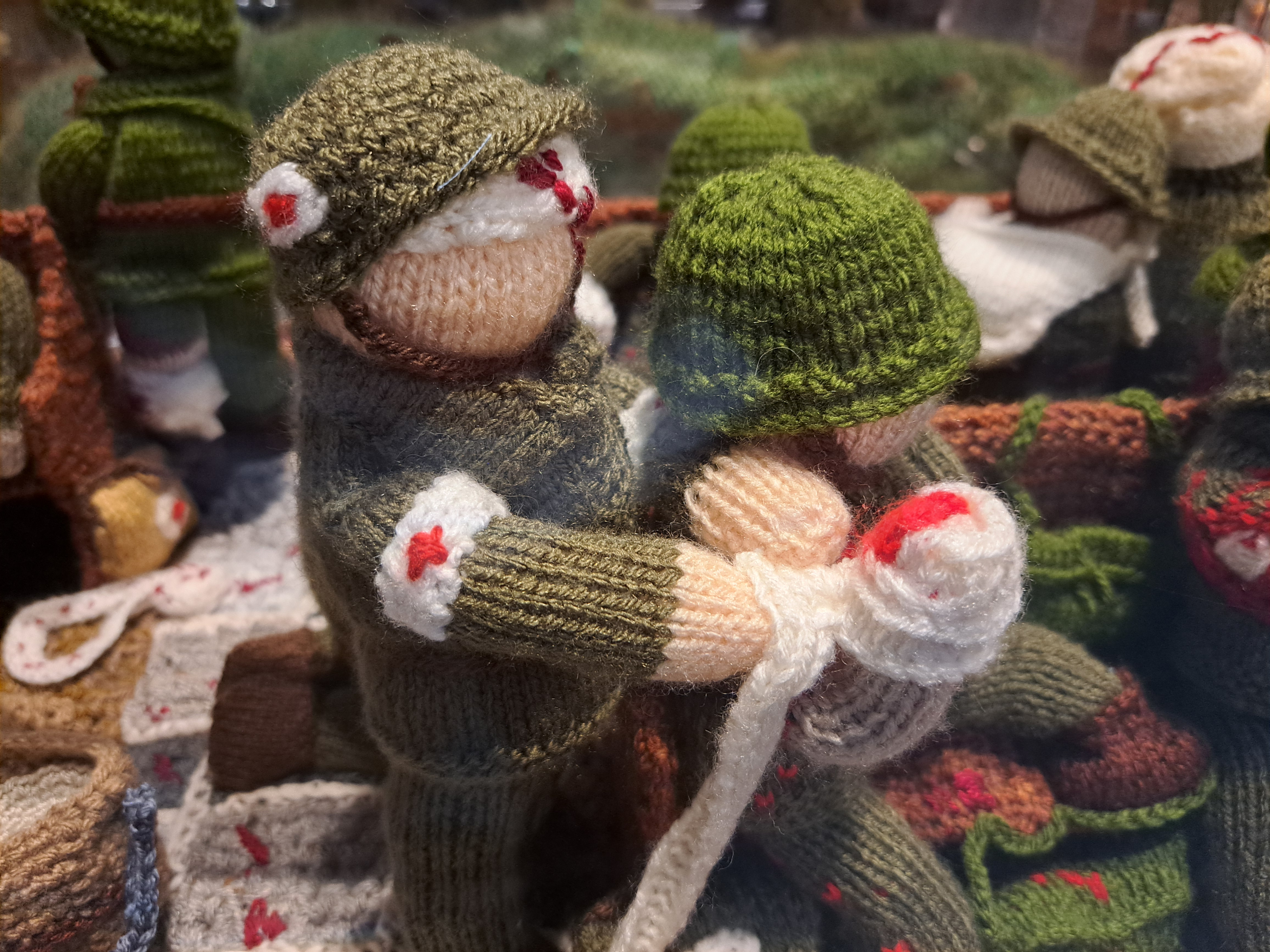
Anfoville au Plain Artist: Anne Constable

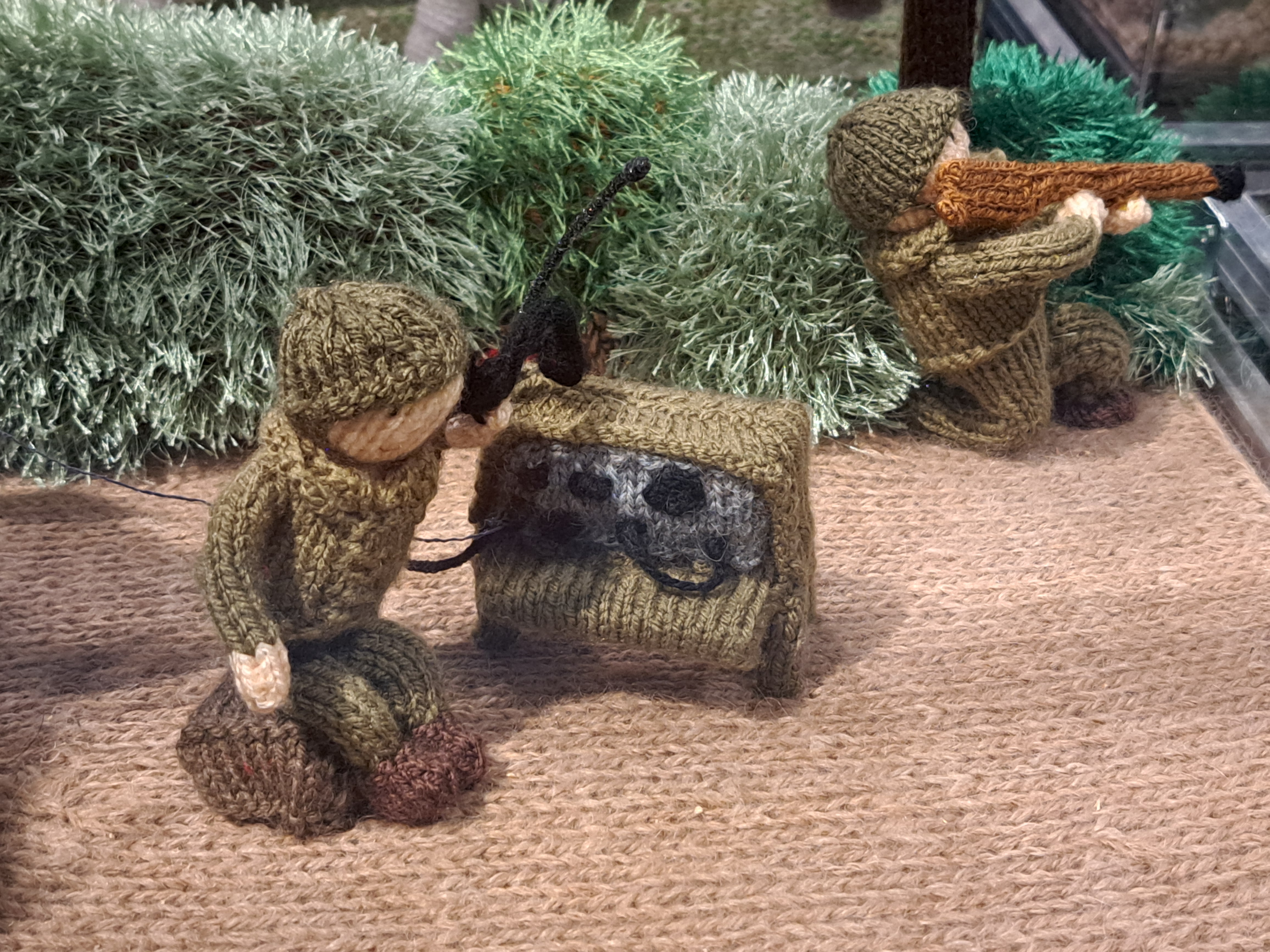
Harry Kulkowitz signals Artist: Jenny Shepherd & Diane Peacock

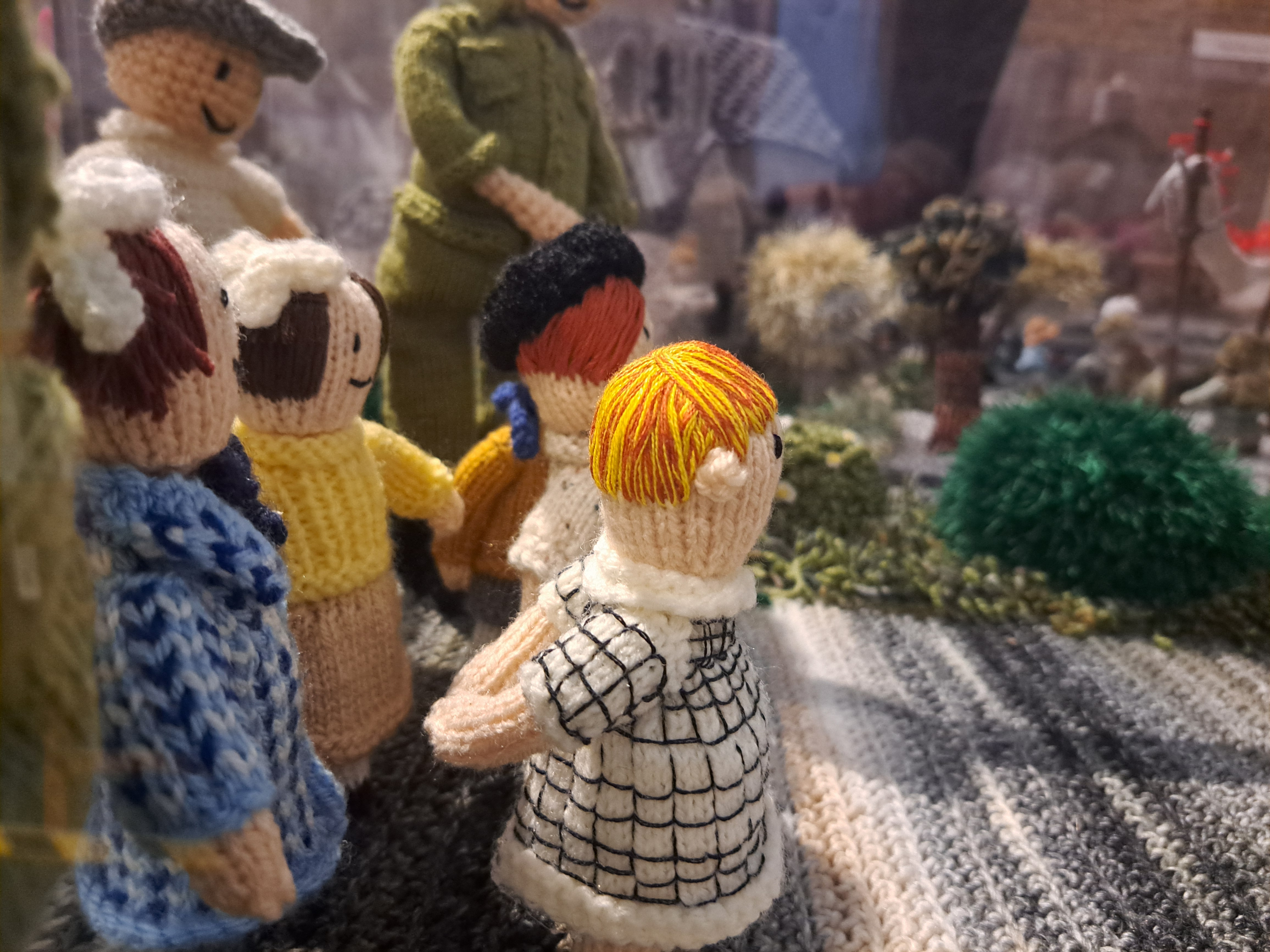
Houesville Paulette Artist: Lorraine Perry & Jennifer Taylor

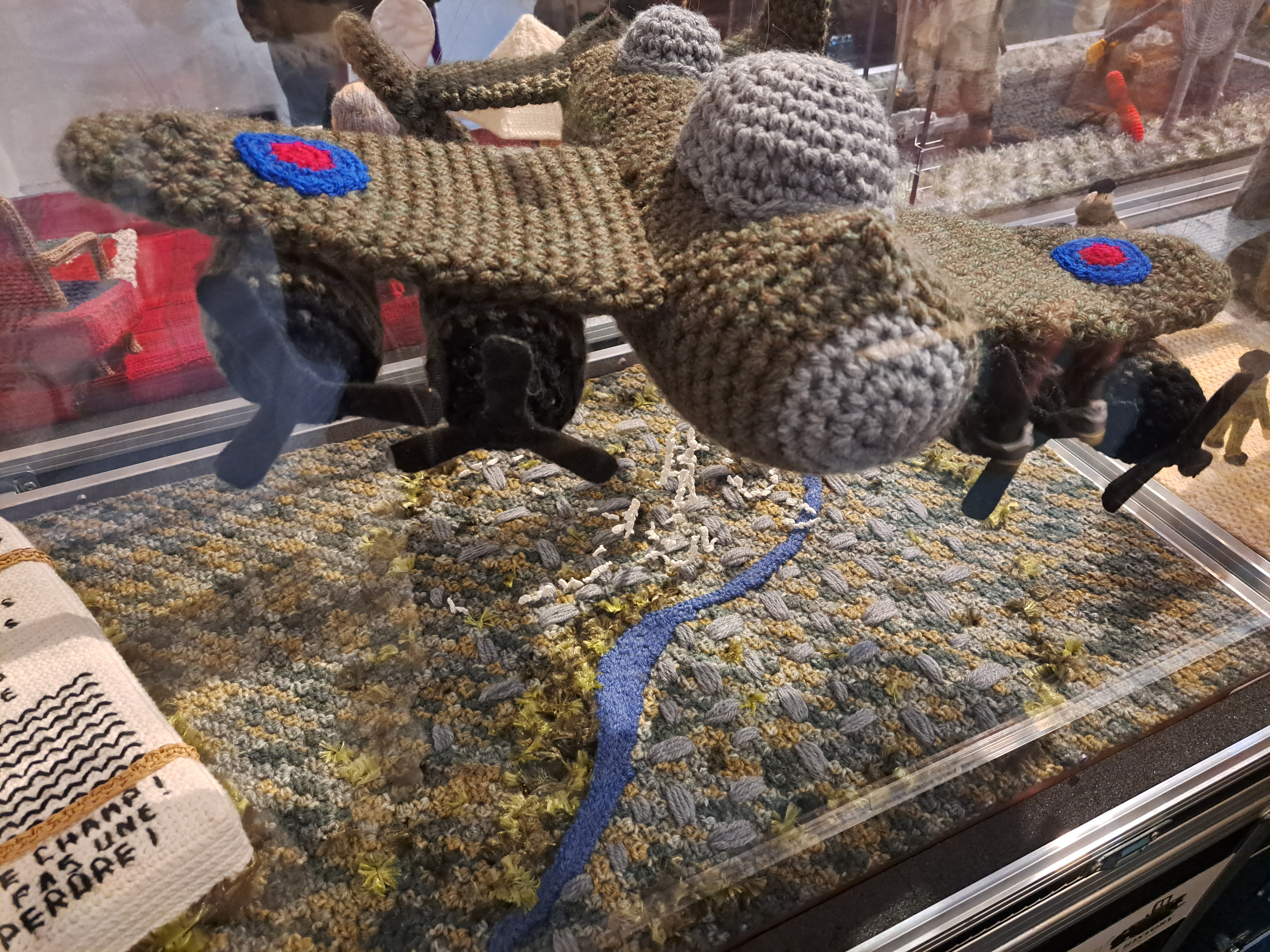
Leaflets being dropped Artist: Aimee Nutthall

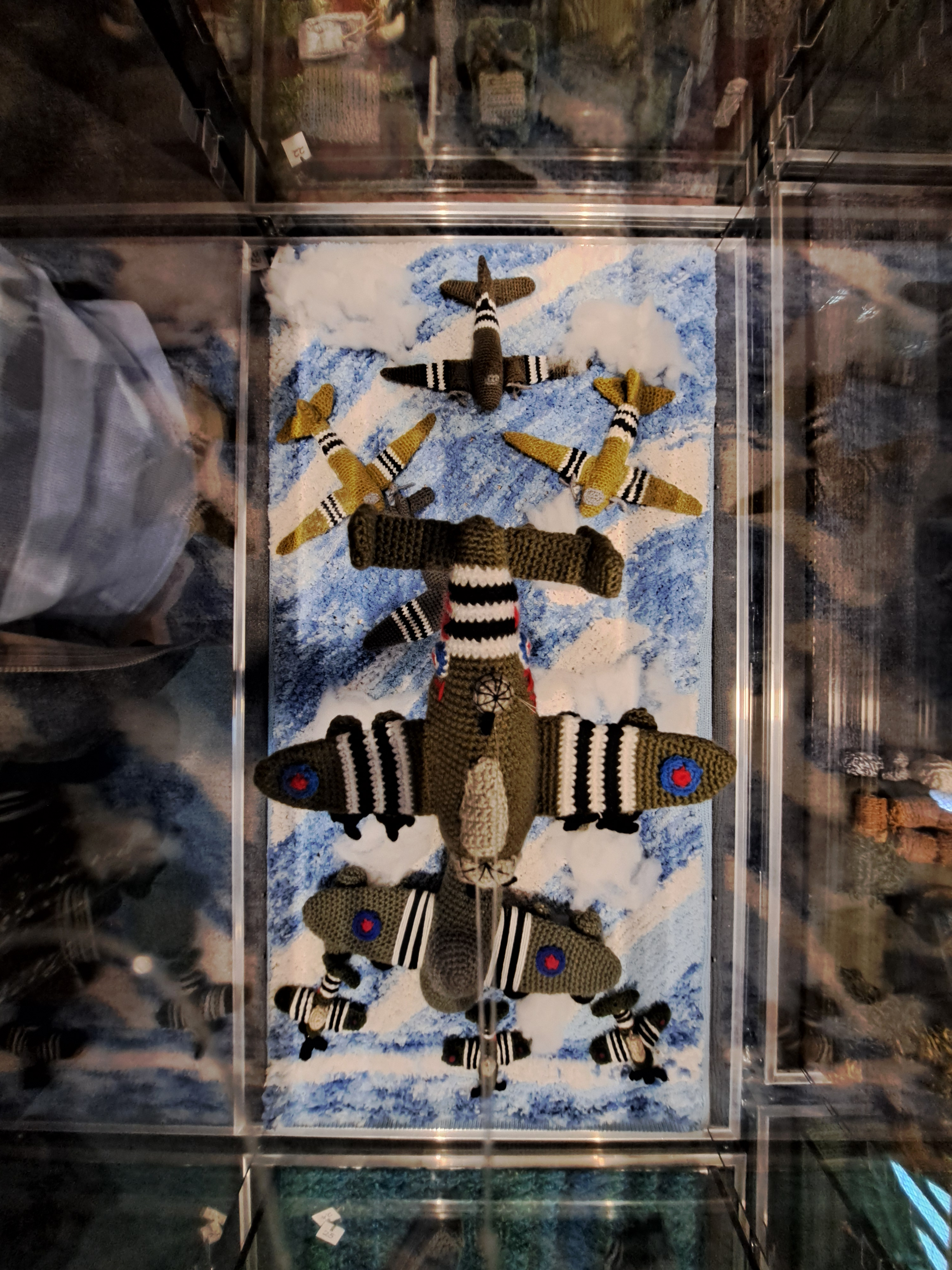
Aircraft as far as the eye can see Artist: June Harper, Lyn Standfield, Shirley Kinsey; Pam Mellor, Angela Harman

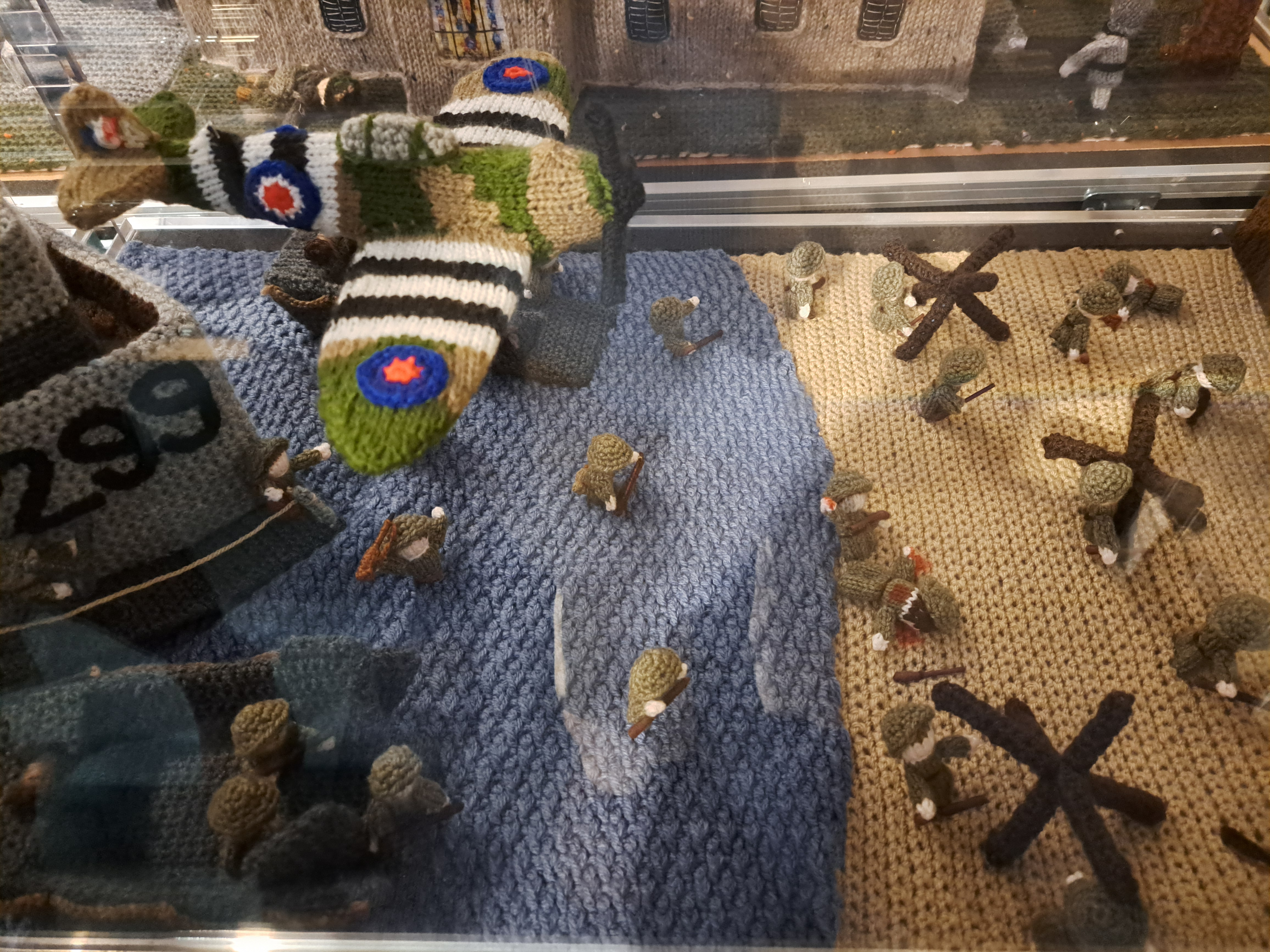
Juno beach Artist: Barbara Jennings

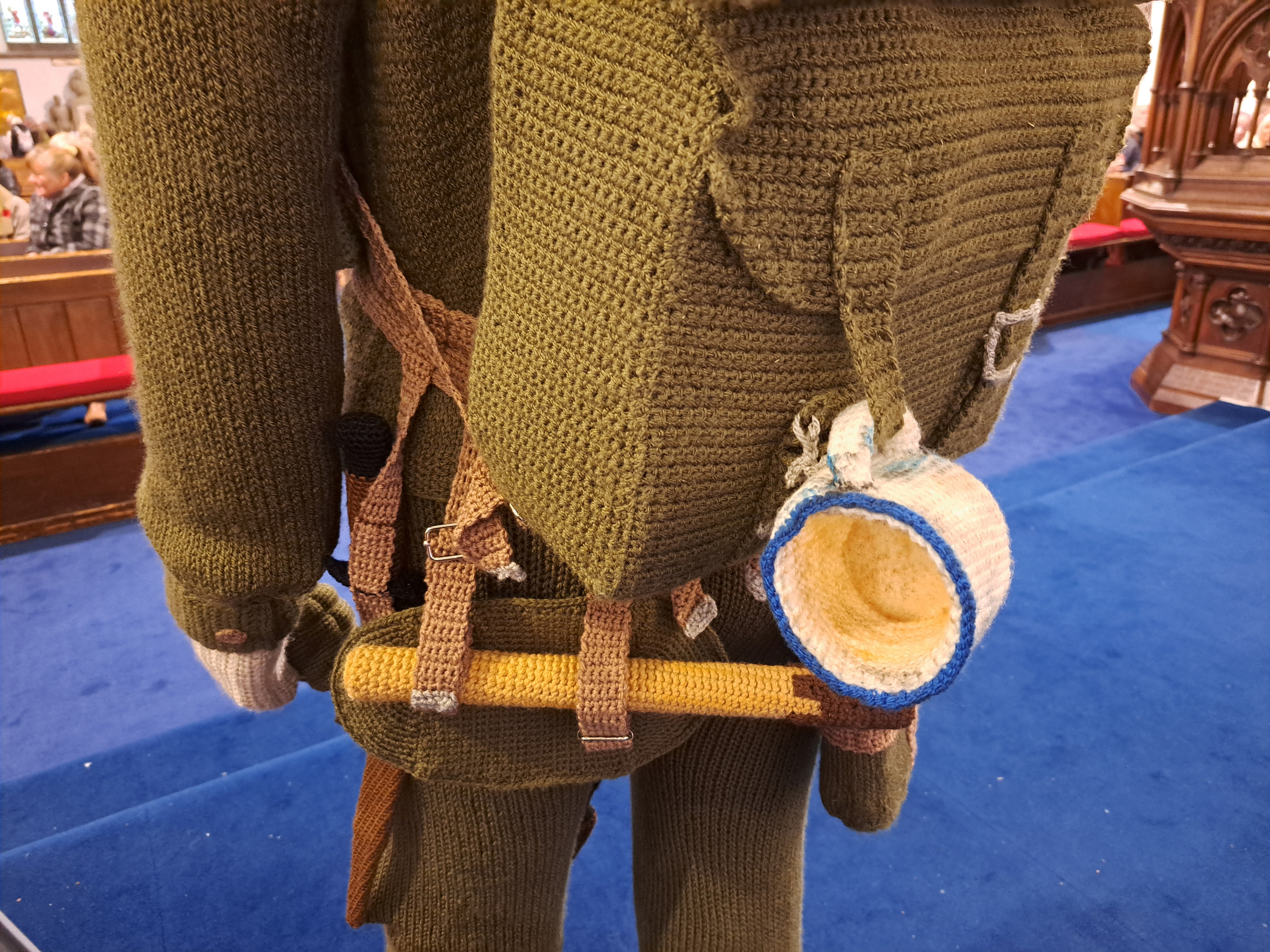
Life-size soldier showing backpack and tea stained mug

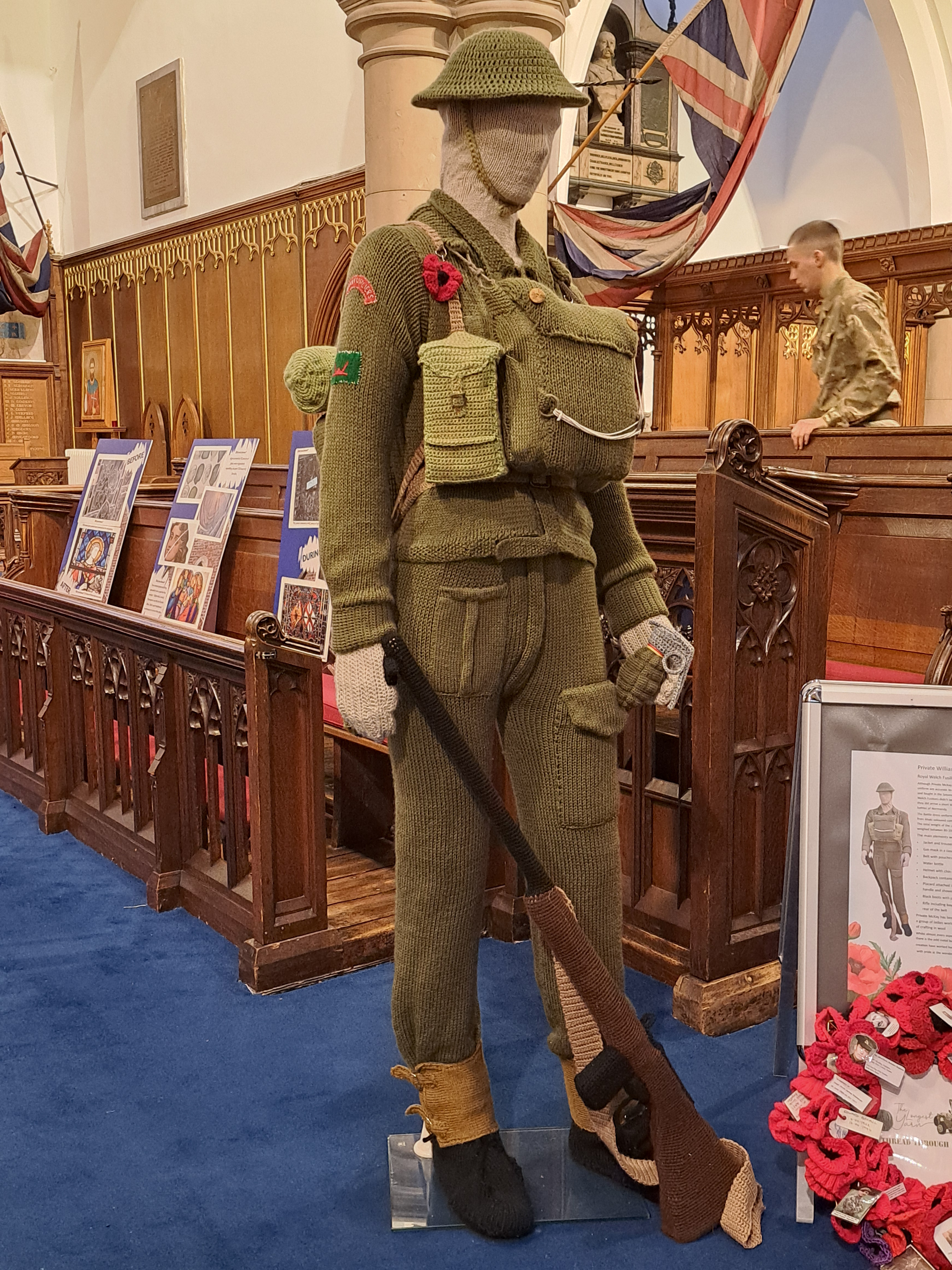
life-size soldier

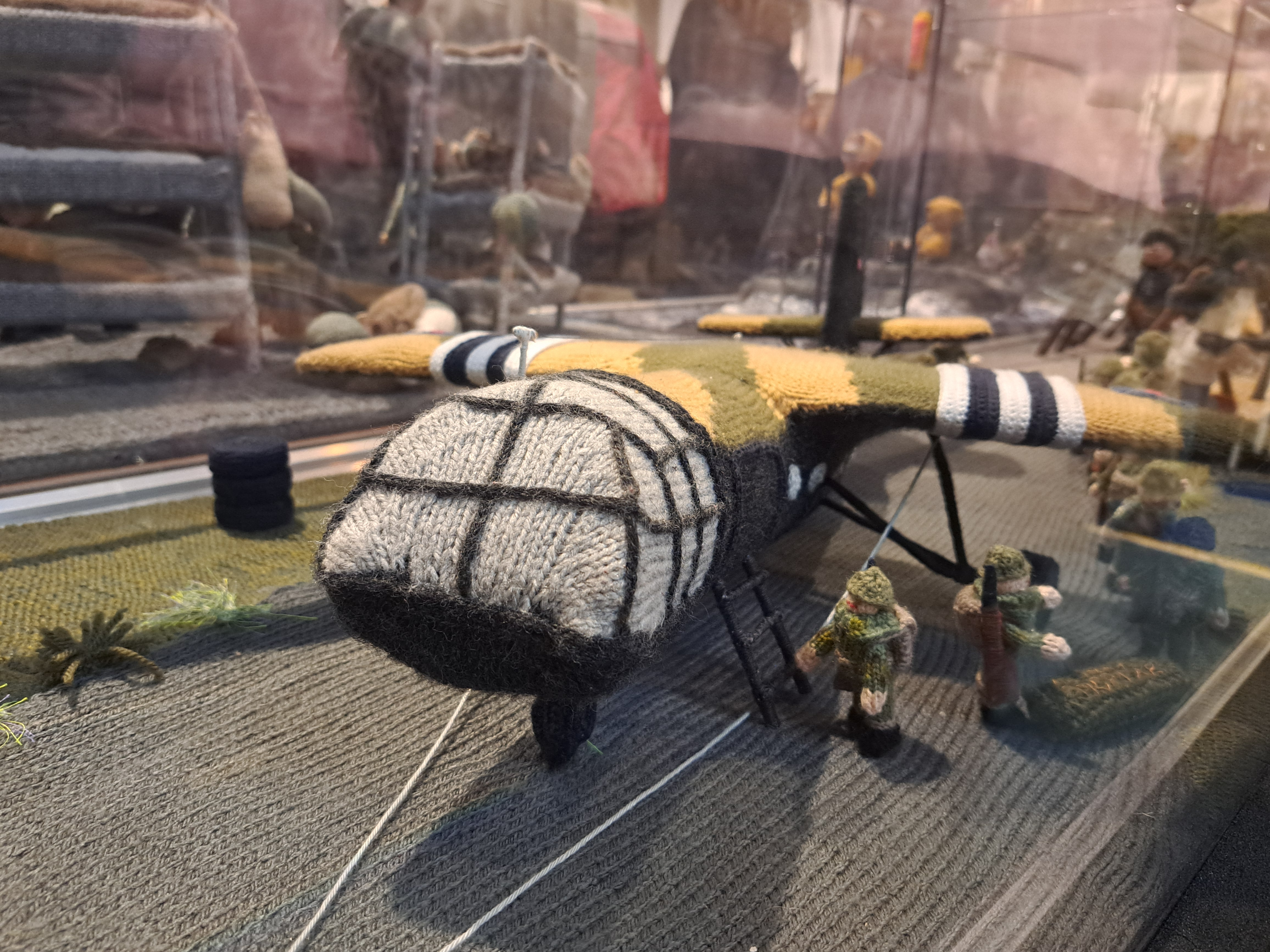
Loading airborne troops Artist: Gillian Wright & Diane McCombs

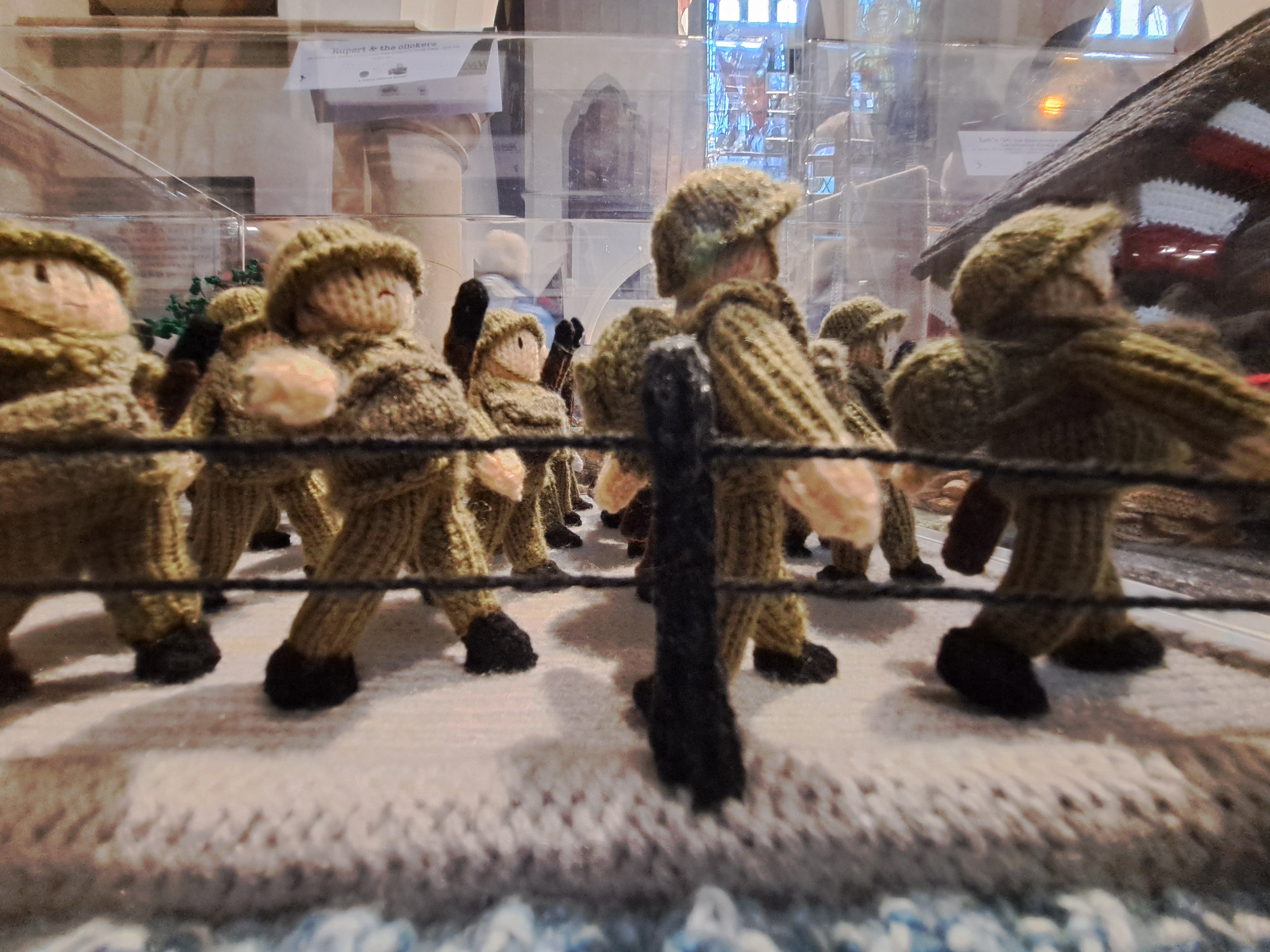
Marching soldiers, Weymouth Artist: Jenny Shepherd & Diane Peacock

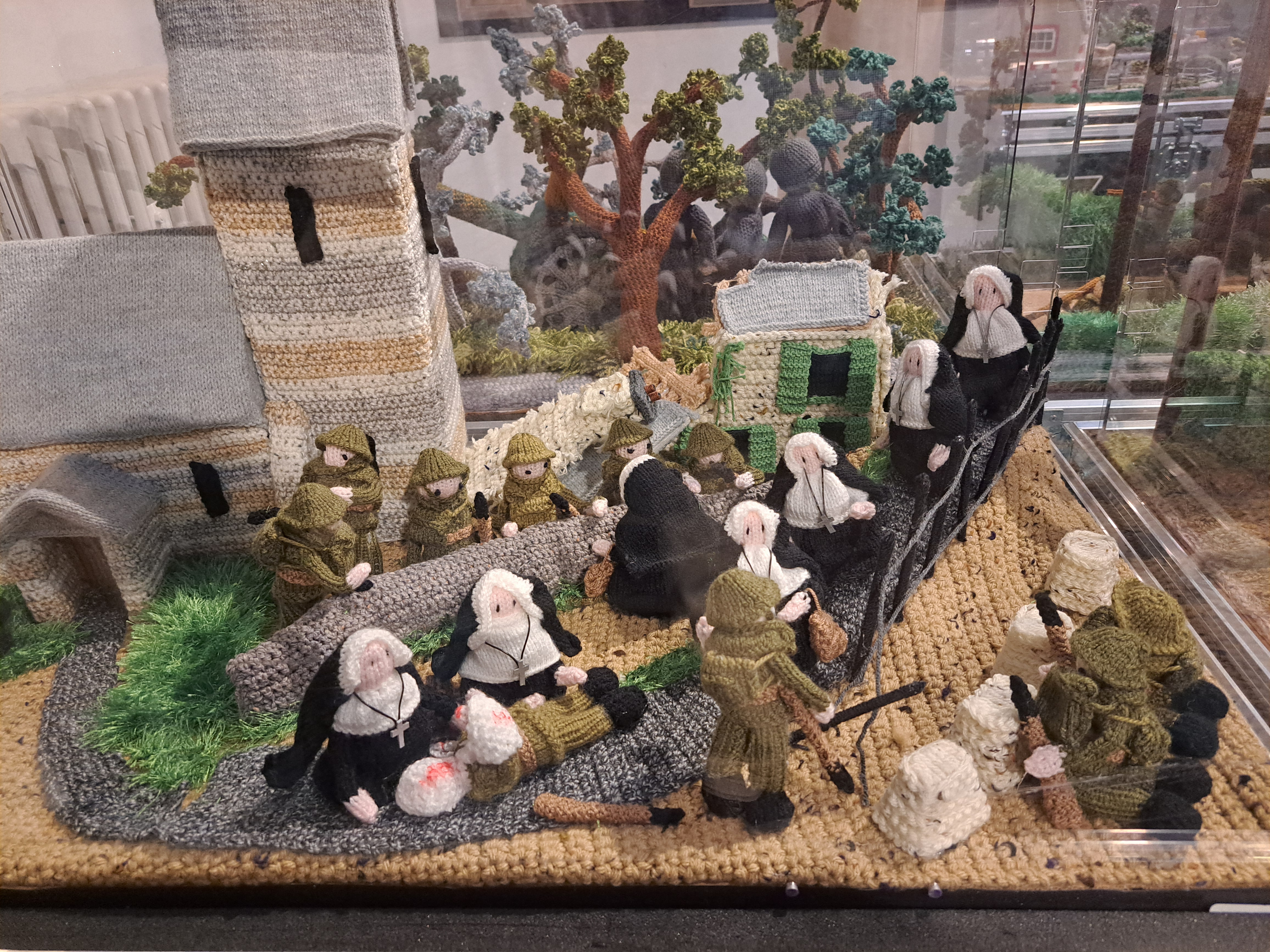
Nuns appearing in Ouistreham Artist: Heather Measey

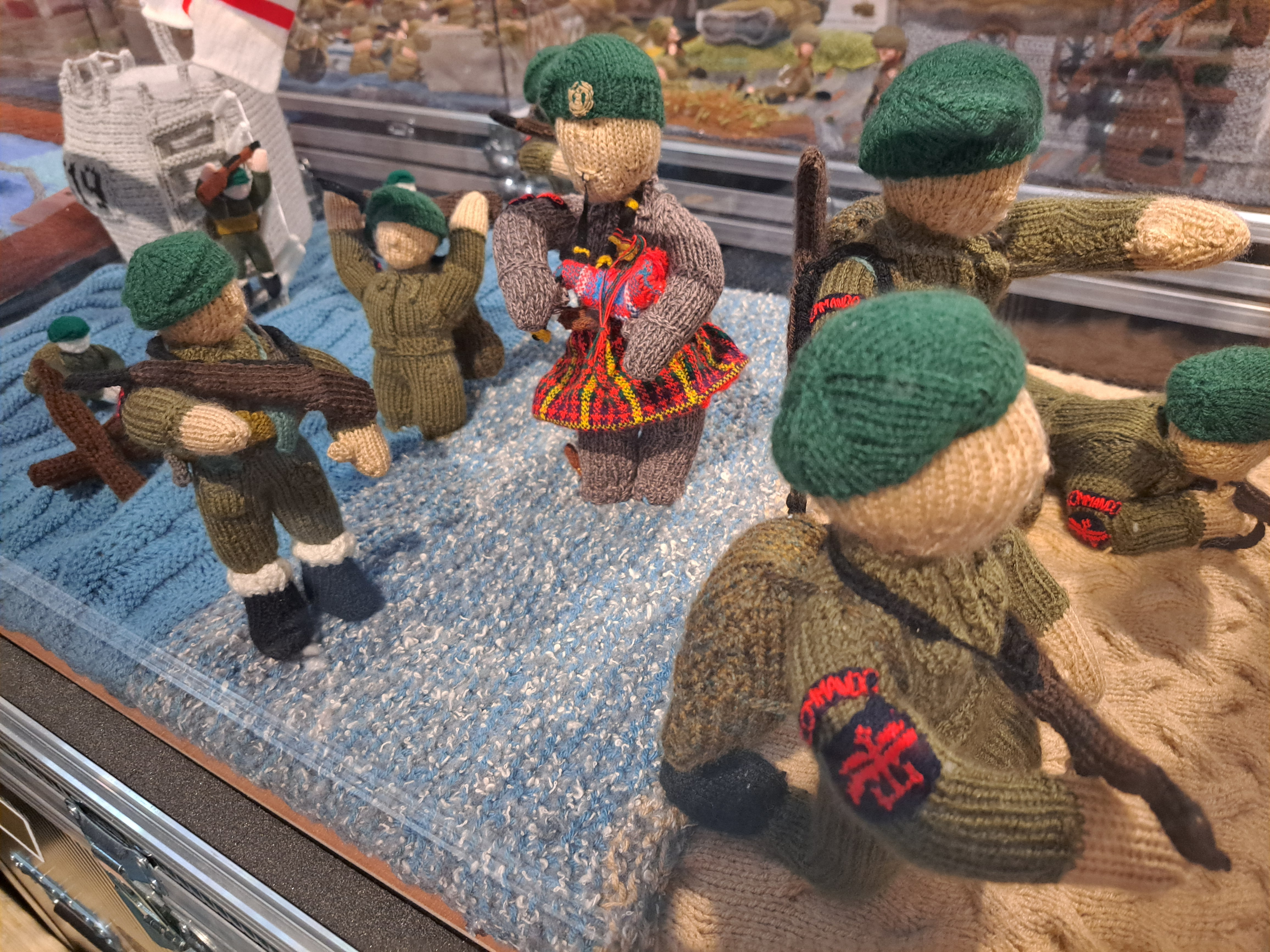
Sword beach Artist: Paula Campbell
