= Hans Christian Blech =

German movie actor (1915–1993)

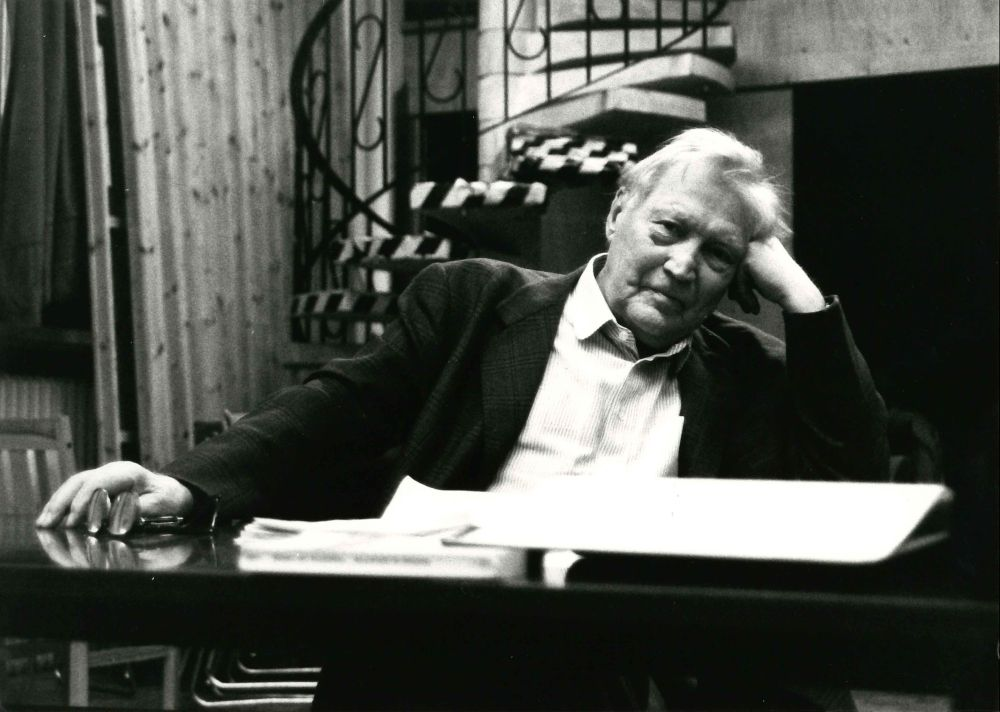
- Hans Christian Blech (1986)
- Born: 20 February 1915; Darmstadt, German Empire
- Died: 5 March 1993 (aged 78); Munich, Bavaria, Germany
- Resting place: Old Cemetery, Darmstadt
- Occupation: Actor
- Years active: 1948–1992
- Spouse: Erni Wilhelmi (m. 1952)

Hans Christian Blech (20 February 1915 – 5 March 1993) was a German film, stage and television character actor who found success in both Germany and Hollywood.

== Career ==
Blech was born in Darmstadt, Germany in 1915 during World War I. After Adolf Hitler and the Nazis took over Germany in 1933 Blech was conscripted into the Feldgendarmerie in 1941. He served in the army and fought on the Eastern Front until the end of World War II, where he may have acquired his facial scars. Another possible origin of his scars was a car accident on the Darmstadt Luisenplatz when Blech was 14 years old. After four years on the Russian Front, he remained in Soviet captivity until 1947.

He made his English-language film debut in the 1951 film Decision Before Dawn. In this as in many of his other Hollywood films, he played a German soldier. He had prominent roles in the 1962 World War II blockbuster films The Longest Day, Morituri (1965), Battle of the Bulge (1965) and The Bridge at Remagen (1969).

== Partial filmography ==
- Blum Affair (1948), as Karlheinz Gabler
- The Orplid Mystery (1950), as Martin Jarzombeck, Bräutigam
- Decision Before Dawn (1951), as Sgt. Rudolf Barth aka Tiger
- Sauerbruch – Das war mein Leben (1954), as Brauer
- Confession Under Four Eyes (1954), as Tscheche
- 08/15 (1954), as Wachtmeister Platzek
- The Phantom of the Big Tent (1954), as Naso, Clown mit Puppe
- Children, Mother, and the General (1955), as Feldwebel mit den Orden
- 08/15 – Part 2 (1955), as Wachtmeister Platzek
- Bandits of the Autobahn (1955), as Willi Kollanski
- 08/15 at Home (1955), as Wachtmeister Platzek
- Weil du arm bist, mußt du früher sterben (1956), as Heinze
- Un homme se penche sur son passé (1958), as Archer
- As Long as the Heart Still Beats (1958), as Dr. Laue
- Ich schwöre und gelobe (1960), as Oberarzt Dr. Neugebauer
- The Inheritance of Bjorndal (1960), as Aslak, Gunvor's Husband
- Enclosure (1961), as Karl
- The Longest Day (1962), as Major Werner Pluskat
- The Visit (1964), as Captain Dobrik
- Morituri (1965), as Donkeyman
- Battle of the Bulge (1965), as Conrad
- La Voleuse (1966), as Radek Kostrowicz
- Marat/Sade (1967, TV film), as Jean-Paul Marat
- The Bridge at Remagen (1969), as Capt. Carl Schmidt
- Cardillac (1969), as Cardillac
- The Customer of the Off Season (1970), as Hotel Manager
- The Scarlet Letter (1973), as Roger Chillingworth
- Giordano Bruno (1973), as Sartori
- Le Hasard et la Violence (1974) (uncredited)
- La Chair de l'orchidée (1975), as Gyula Berekian
- The Wrong Move (1975), as Laertes
- Innocents with Dirty Hands (1975), as Judge
- Il faut vivre dangereusement (1975), as Ritter
- The Clown (1976), as Derkum
- Bait (1976), as Frank
- Grete Minde (1977), as Gigas
- Maiden's War (1977), as Sellman
- Knife in the Head (1978), as Anleitner
- Winterspelt (1979), as Wenzel Hainstock
- Theodor Chindler (1979, TV miniseries), as Theodor Chindler
- Victoria (1979), as Tutor
- See You in the Next War (1980), as Bitter
- Looping (1981), as Johnny
- Collin (1981, TV film), as Wilhelm Urack
- The Magic Mountain (1982), as Hofrat Behrens
- Solo Run (1983, TV film), as C.
- Lenin in Zürich (1984, TV film), as Hermann Greulich
- Colonel Redl (1985), as von Roden
- Via Mala (1985, TV miniseries), as Maler Lauters
- Please, Let the Flowers Live (1986, TV film), as Langenau
- The Cry of the Owl (1987, TV film), as Dr. Knapp
- The Play with Billions (1989, TV film), as Falk Schönwald
- Mit den Clowns kamen die Tränen (1990, TV miniseries), as Alwin Westen
- Magyar rekviem (1990), as Tanár úr
- The Eighth Day (1990), as Svoboda
- Wer zu spät kommt – Das Politbüro erlebt die deutsche Revolution (1990, TV film), as Erich Honecker
- Begräbnis einer Gräfin (1991), as Pfarrer Nothsack
- Das große Fest (1992, TV film), as Richard
