= 916th Grenadier Regiment (Wehrmacht) =

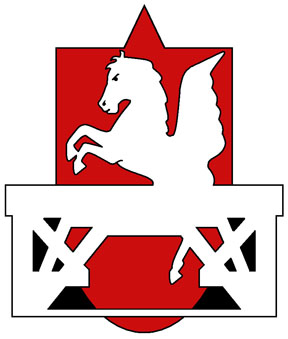
- Unit insignia
- Active: November 1943 – 8 May 1945
- Country: Nazi Germany
- Branch: Army
- Type: Infantry
- Engagements: World War II: D-Day; Battle of the Bulge

Grenadier Regiment 916 was an infantry regiment of the Wehrmacht from 1943 until 1945.

It was set up in the area around Saint-Lô and then sent to Omaha Beach in December 1943.

Oberst i.G. Ernst Goth was the commander of Grenadier Regiment 916 (Gren Reg 916) from the beginning to the end around 29 July 1944 in the Saint-Lô area where the whole 352nd Infantry Division was deactivated.

Gren Reg 916 was split up in the Omaha Beach area and fought against the United States 29th Infantry Division, 2nd Ranger Battalion and 1st infantry divisions on D-Day. The headquarters of the regiment was located in Trévières. The companies were close to several coastal villages: Vierville, St. Laurent, Colleville-sur-Mer, posted there as second line to counterattack the Allied forces once they landed.

Oberst (Colonel) Goth held the highest rank on the German side on D-Day and personally led counter-attacks to regain ground.

The 916th withdrew on 8 June from the Omaha Beach area and made the retreat to Saint-Lô. Fighting the US divisions with only rifles, machine guns and hand grenades. Very little supply reached the combatants. Soldiers of the Regiment can be found at the German war cemetery at La Cambe German war cemetery in Normandy.

The oldest reenactment group portraying Grenadier Regiment 916 today is known as GR916 in New England. This group has related units located throughout both the UK and the USA.
