= The Longest Day (film) =

1962 war film produced by Darryl F. Zanuck

- Theatrical release poster
- Directed by: British and French: Ken Annakin; American: Andrew Marton; German: Bernhard Wicki
- Screenplay by: Cornelius Ryan; Romain Gary; James Jones; David Pursall; Jack Seddon
- Based on: The Longest Day (1959 book) by Cornelius Ryan
- Produced by: Darryl F. Zanuck
- Starring: See Cast list
- Cinematography: Jean Bourgoin; Walter Wottitz
- Edited by: Samuel E. Beetley
- Music by: Maurice Jarre
- Production company: Darryl F. Zanuck Productions
- Distributed by: 20th Century-Fox
- Release dates: September 25, 1962 (France); October 4, 1962 (U.S.)
- Running time: 178 minutes
- Country: United States
- Languages: English; German; French
- Budget: $7.75 million
- Box office: $50.1 million

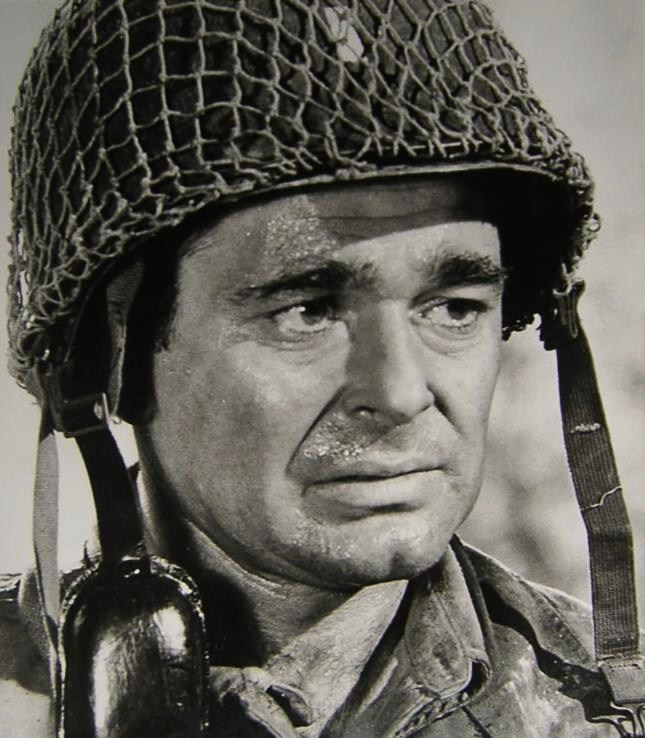
Stuart Whitman

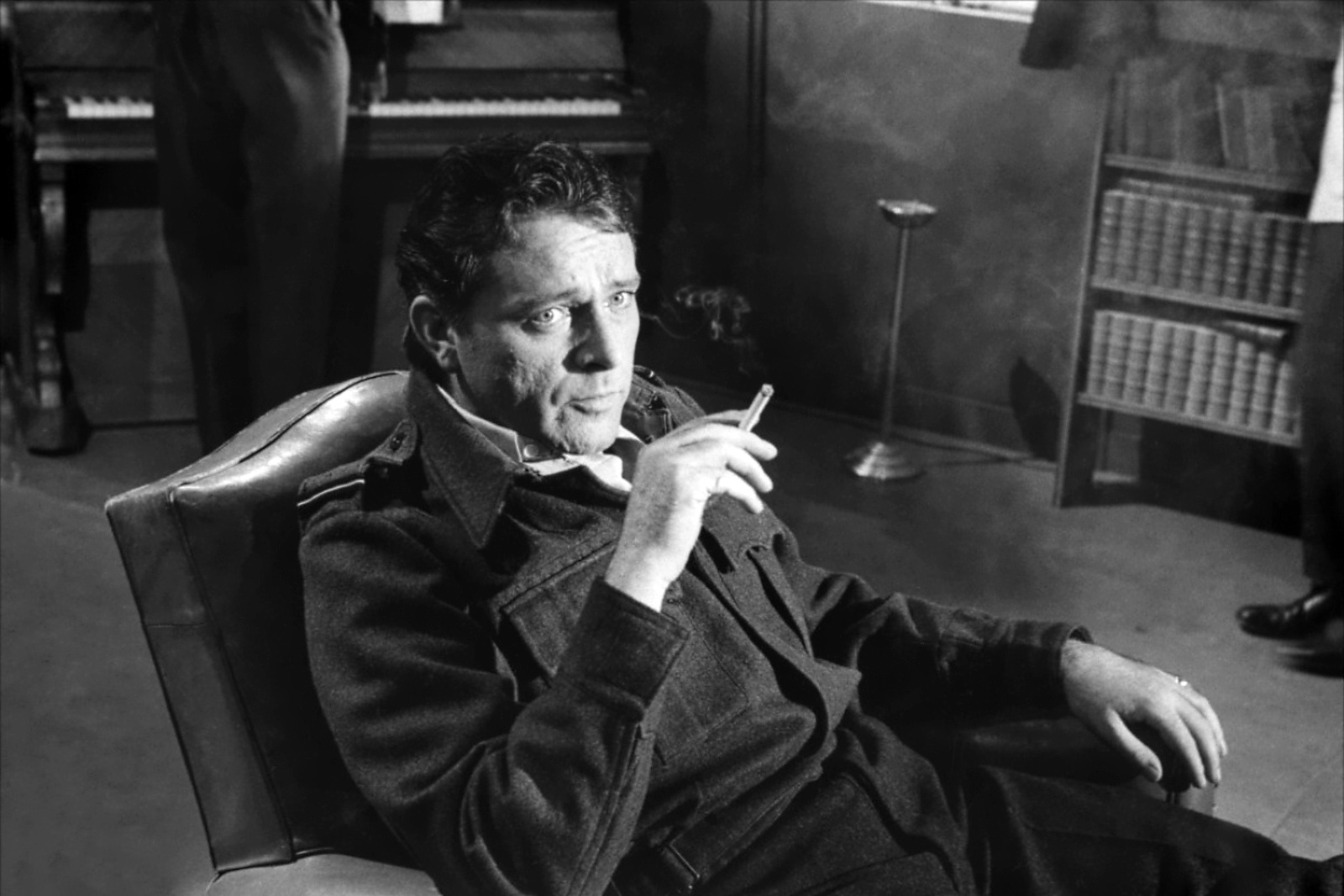
Richard Burton

The Longest Day is a 1962 American epic war film based on Cornelius Ryan's 1959 nonfiction book about the D-Day landings in Normandy on June 6, 1944. The film was produced by Darryl F. Zanuck for 20th Century-Fox and was directed by Ken Annakin (British and French exteriors), Andrew Marton (American exteriors), and Bernhard Wicki (German scenes). The screenplay was written by Ryan, with additional material written by Romain Gary, James Jones, David Pursall, and Jack Seddon.

The film features a large international ensemble cast, many of whom play roles that were essentially cameo appearances. Several cast members had seen action as servicemen during the war. They include Richard Todd (Parachute Regt), who participated in the assault on Pegasus Bridge in the early hours of D-Day. Among others who saw active service were Eddie Albert (US Navy), Hans Christian Blech (Wehrmacht, Eastern Front), Henry Fonda (US Navy), Leo Genn (Royal Artillery), John Gregson (Royal Navy), Donald Houston (RAF rear gunner), Kenneth More (Royal Navy), Edmond O'Brien (USAAF), Heinz Reincke (Wehrmacht officer), Robert Ryan (US Marines), and Rod Steiger (US Navy).

The filmmakers employed several actual Allied and Axis D-Day participants as consultants, many of whom had their roles re-enacted in the film. These included Günther Blumentritt (a former German general), James M. Gavin (an American general), Frederick Morgan (deputy chief of staff at Supreme Headquarters Allied Expeditionary Force, SHAEF), John Howard (who led the airborne assault on the Pegasus Bridge), Lord Lovat (who commanded the 1st Special Service Brigade), Philippe Kieffer (who led his men in the assault on Ouistreham), Marie-Pierre Kœnig (who commanded the Free French Forces in the invasion), Max Pemsel (a German general), Werner Pluskat (the major who was the first German officer to see the invasion fleet), Josef "Pips" Priller (the hot-headed pilot who was one of the few Luftwaffe pilots to strafe the beaches), and Lucie Rommel (widow of Field Marshal Erwin Rommel).

The Longest Day premiered in France on September 25, 1962, and in the United States on October 4. It received acclaim from critics and was a significant commercial success, becoming the highest-grossing black-and-white movie at the time. At the 35th Academy Awards, the film was nominated for five Oscars, including Best Picture, and won awards for Best Cinematography (Black-and-White) and Best Special Effects.

== Plot ==
Shot in a docudrama style (with captions identifying the different participants), the film opens in the days leading up to D-Day, depicting events on both sides of the English Channel. Disagreement existed within the German High Command as to where the Allies would land and how the Wehrmacht should respond, but the threat is not perceived to be imminent, given the stormy weather. On June 5, 1944, not wanting to keep his forces waiting any longer, Gen. Dwight D. Eisenhower, Supreme Commander of SHAEF, makes the decision to go ahead with plans to invade France through Normandy the following day, after receiving a somewhat hopeful weather report.

In the early hours of June 6, Allied airborne troops are sent in to take key locations, and the French Resistance reacts to the news that the invasion has started. British troops arrive in gliders to secure Pegasus Bridge, American paratroopers land scattered around Sainte-Mère-Église to defend a road that will be a vital artery for the invasion, and French Resistance and SOE agents conduct infiltration and sabotage work. Uncertainty among German commanders exists about whether these events are a feint to distract from Allied crossings at the Strait of Dover (see Operation Fortitude), where the senior German staff had always assumed the invasion would begin.

As day breaks, Allied forces land on several beaches in Normandy and attempt to push inland, having particular trouble at Omaha Beach. Two lone Luftwaffe pilots strafe the beaches before flying away. The U.S. Provisional Ranger Group conducts an assault on the artillery at Pointe du Hoc, only to discover the guns have been moved. Free French Forces destroy a German stronghold in Ouistreham. After blowing through a concrete barrier, the American troops on Omaha Beach are able to begin their advance and join the rest of the Allied troops on the march to retake France and, eventually, conquer Germany.

== Cast ==
=== American ===
Actor	Role	Notes
Henry Grace (Note: Voice dubbed by Allen Swift.)	Gen. Dwight D. Eisenhower	Supreme Commander, Supreme Headquarters Allied Expeditionary Force (SHAEF)
Alexander Knox	Lt. Gen. Walter Bedell Smith	Chief of Staff, SHAEF
Arthur Hill	Lt. Gen. Omar N. Bradley	Commander, 1st Army
John Meillon	Rear Admiral Alan G. Kirk	Commander, Western Naval Task Force, U.S. 8th Fleet
Mel Ferrer	Major Gen. Robert Haines	Assistant Commander, SHAEF
Edmond O'Brien	Major Gen. Raymond O. Barton	Commander, 4th Infantry Division
Henry Fonda	Brigadier Gen. Theodore Roosevelt Jr.	Assistant Commander, 4th Infantry Division
Robert Mitchum	Brigadier Gen. Norman Cota	Assistant Commander, 29th Infantry Division (Note: In the film, Cota says: "Only two kinds of people are gonna stay on this beach: those that are already dead and those that are gonna die." In reality, this was said by Colonel George A. Taylor of the US 16th Infantry Regiment.)
Robert Ryan	Brigadier Gen. James M. Gavin	Assistant Commander, 82nd Airborne Division
John Crawford	Col. Eugene M. Caffey	Commander, 1st Engineer Special Brigade
Eddie Albert	Col. Lloyd Thompson	Aide-de-camp to Cota, 29th Infantry Division (Note: Colonel Thompson of the 6th Engineer Special Brigade is included in the book The Longest Day [p.308], but, unlike in the film, he survived the battle. A line spoken by Thompson in the film about getting the troops off the beaches was actually said by Norman Cota.)
John Wayne	Lieutenant Col. Benjamin H. Vandervoort	CO, 2nd Battalion, 505th Parachute Infantry Regiment
Bill Nagy	Maj. Lance	XO, 2nd Battalion, 505th Parachute Infantry Regiment
Fred Dur	Maj. Stoltz	XO, 2nd Ranger Battalion
Rod Steiger	Lieutenant Cmdr. Joseph Witherow Jr.	Commander, USS Satterlee
Steve Forrest	Capt. Harding	XO, 2nd Battalion, 505th Parachute Infantry Regiment
Ray Danton	Capt. Frank	XO, 29th Infantry Division
Stuart Whitman	Lt. Sheen	Paratrooper, 2nd Battalion, 505th Parachute Infantry Regiment
Tom Tryon	Lt. Wilson	Paratrooper, 2nd Battalion, 505th Parachute Infantry Regiment
Gary Collins	Ensign Sheeran	Bridge officer, USS Satterlee
Jeffrey Hunter	Sgt. John H. Fuller (later field promoted to Lieutenant)	Combat engineer, 299th Engineer Combat Battalion
Tony Mordente	Wyman	Cook, 82nd Airborne Division
Bob Steele	Corporal Alexander	Paratrooper, 82nd Airborne Division
Richard Beymer	Pvt. Arthur 'Dutch' Schultz	Paratrooper, 82nd Airborne Division
Red Buttons	Pvt. John Steele	Paratrooper, 2nd Battalion, 505th Parachute Infantry Regiment
Sal Mineo	Pvt. Martini	Paratrooper, 82nd Airborne Division
Roddy McDowall	Pvt. Morris	Infantryman, 4th Infantry Division
George Segal	Pvt. Wohl	Infantryman, 2nd Ranger Battalion
Robert Wagner	Pvt. Keller	Infantryman, 2nd Ranger Battalion
Paul Anka	Pvt. Lowell	Infantryman, 2nd Ranger Battalion
Mark Damon	Pvt. Harris	Infantryman, 29th Infantry Division
Peter Helm	Young Pvt. who loses his rifle	Infantryman, 29th Infantry Division
Fabian	Pvt. Forte	Infantryman, 2nd Ranger Battalion
Tommy Sands	Pvt. Hunt	Infantryman, 2nd Ranger Battalion
Joseph Lowe	Ranger Pvt.	Sgt. Joseph T. Lowe of the 505th Infantry Battle Group was a 22-year-old PFC with the Fifth Ranger Battalion on the day
Mickey Knox	Airman Louis	Downed airman with damaged eye
Ron Randell	Joe Williams	War correspondent

=== British ===
Actor	Role	Notes
Trevor Reid	Gen. Sir Bernard Montgomery	Commander-in-Chief, Allied Ground Forces
John Robinson	Adm. Sir Bertram Ramsay	Commander-in-Chief, Allied Naval Forces
Simon Lack	Air Chief Marshal Sir Trafford Leigh-Mallory	Commander-in-Chief, Allied Expeditionary Air Force (AEAF)
Louis Mounier	Air Chief Marshal Sir Arthur Tedder	Deputy Supreme Commander, Allied Expeditionary Forces
Walter Horsbrugh	Rear-Adm. George Creasy	Chief of Staff to Admiral Ramsay
Leo Genn	Major-Gen. Hollander	XO, SHAEF
Peter Lawford	Brig. Simon Fraser, Lord Lovat	Commander, 1st Special Service Brigade
Patrick Barr	Group Capt. J. M. Stagg	Meteorologist
Kenneth More	Acting Capt. Colin Maud	Beachmaster, Juno Beach, Royal Navy
Richard Todd	Maj. John Howard	OC, "D" Company, 2nd Battalion, Oxfordshire and Buckinghamshire Light Infantry
Howard Marion-Crawford	Maj. John Jacob-Vaughan	Medical Officer, 2nd Battalion, Oxfordshire and Buckinghamshire Light Infantry
Richard Wattis	Maj. Whaley	6th Airborne Division
Jack Hedley	Captain, Parachute Regiment	6th Airborne Division briefing officer
Leslie Phillips	Flight Lt. Owens	RAF officer with French Resistance
Lyndon Brook	Lt. Ian Walsh	"D" Company, 2nd Battalion, Oxfordshire and Buckinghamshire Light Infantry
Patrick Jordan	Lt. Richard Todd	7th (Light Infantry) Parachute Battalion
Richard Burton	Flying Officer David Campbell	Fighter pilot, Royal Air Force (Note: There is no RAF officer by the name of Campbell in Ryan's book, but the story of a wounded man's leg being treated with safety pins is true. Likewise, the report of a German putting his boots on the wrong feet is true, though he was not shot and killed. However, Pvt. Schultz did not meet with an RAF officer while he was lost.)
Donald Houston	Flying Officer Neil	Fighter pilot, Royal Air Force
John Gregson	Chaplain Wattis	Padre, 6th Airborne Division
Siân Phillips	Chief Wren Jennings	Wren assistant to Stagg
Richard Dawson	Cpl. Purdom	
Harry Fowler	Cpl. Lehman	Paratrooper, 6th Airborne Division
Bernard Fox	Lance-Cpl. Hutchinson (Note: There is no character with this name in Ryan's book.)	Royal Armoured Corps
Norman Rossington	Lance-Cpl. Clough	3rd Infantry Division
Sean Connery	Pte. Flanagan	Infantryman, 3rd Infantry Division (Note: There is only one soldier named Flanagan in Ryan's book, but he is an American Soldier.)
Frank Finlay	Pte. Coke	"D" Company, 2nd Battalion, Oxfordshire and Buckinghamshire Light Infantry
Harold Goodwin (Note: Goodwin is the nervous soldier singing Lambeth Walk on the Horsa. He is also the first to hear the bagpipe as the relief column approaches Pegasus Bridge.)	Pte. Coke's friend	"D" Company, 2nd Battalion, Oxfordshire and Buckinghamshire Light Infantry
Michael Medwin	Pte. Watney	Universal Carrier driver, 3rd Infantry Division
Leslie de Laspee	Pte. Bill Millin	Piper, 1st Special Service Brigade
Victor Maddern	Cook	
Bryan Coleman	Ronald Callen	War correspondent

=== French ===
Actor	Role	Notes
Jean Servais	Contre-amiral Robert Jaujard	Commander, 4th Cruiser Division, Free French Naval Forces
Christian Marquand	Capitaine de Corvette Philippe Kieffer	Group leader, 1er Bataillon de Fusiliers Marins Commandos
Georges Rivière	Second-Maître Guy de Montlaur	Section leader, 1er Bataillon de Fusiliers Marins Commandos
Bernard Fresson	Dubocq	Commando, 1er Bataillon de Fusiliers Marins Commandos
Irina Demick	Jeanine Boitard	Partisan, Caen (Note: Jeanine Boitard was a real person, but, while she did help with the escape of two RAF officers on D-Day, the scene of her being involved in a gunfight with two German soldiers and the wrecking of a train is fictional.)
Yves Barsacq	Marcel	Partisan, Caen
Maurice Poli	Jean	Partisan, Caen
Jean Champion	Édouard	Partisan, Caen
André Bourvil	Alphonse Lenaux	Mayor of Colleville-sur-Orne
Georges Wilson	Alexandre Renaud	Mayor of Sainte-Mère-Église
Jean-Louis Barrault	Father Louis Roulland	Parish priest of Sainte-Mère-Église
Madeleine Renaud	Justine	Mother Superior, Ouistreham
Arletty	Madame Barrault	Resident of Sainte-Mère-Église
Fernand Ledoux	Louis	Elderly farmer
Pauline Carton	Joanna	Louis's housekeeper
Alice Tissot	Gemma	Lenaux's housekeeper
Clément Harari	Arrested Man	Civilian

=== German ===
Actor	Role	Notes
Paul Hartmann	Generalfeldmarschall Gerd von Rundstedt	CO, OB West
Werner Hinz	Generalfeldmarschall Erwin Rommel	CO, Army Group B
Wolfgang Lukschy	Generaloberst Alfred Jodl	Chief of Operations, Oberkommando der Wehrmacht
Ernst Schröder	Generaloberst Hans von Salmuth	CO, 15th Army
Curd Jürgens	General der Infanterie Günther Blumentritt	Chief of Staff, OB West
Richard Münch	General der Artillerie Erich Marcks	CO, LXXXIV Army Corps
Wolfgang Büttner	Generalleutnant Dr. Hans Speidel	Chief of Staff, Army Group B
Wolfgang Preiss	Generalleutnant Max Pemsel	Chief of Staff, 7th Army
Karl John	Generalleutnant Wolfgang Häger	CO, Luftwaffen Kommando West
Paul Edwin Roth	Oberst Ludwig Schiller	
Heinz Reincke	Oberstleutnant Josef Priller	Kommodore, Jagdgeschwader 26
Heinz Spitzner	Oberstleutnant Helmuth Meyer	Chief of Intelligence, 15th Army
Peter van Eyck	Oberstleutnant Karl-Williams Ocker	CO, 352nd Artillery Regiment, 352nd Infantry Division
Walter Gotell	SS-Obersturmbannführer Wilhelm Mohnke	CO, 12th SS Panzer Division Hitlerjugend
Hans Christian Blech	Major Werner Pluskat	CO, 352nd Artillery Regiment, 352nd Infantry Division
Eugene Deckers	Major Becker	Officer in church
Kurt Meisel	Hauptmann Ernst Düring	CO, 352nd Infantry Division
Til Kiwe	Hauptmann Helmuth Lang	Aide-de-camp to Rommel
Hans Söhnker	Hauptmann Witt	Pemsel's staff officer
Robert Freitag	Leutnant Weber	Meyer's aide
Rainer Penkert	Leutnant Fritz Theen	352nd Artillery Regiment, 352nd Infantry Division
Dietmar Schönherr	Leutnant Vogel	Häger's aide
Hartmut Reck	Oberfeldwebel Bernhard Bergsdorf	Pilot, Jagdgeschwader 26
Vicco von Bülow	Oberfeldwebel Leuchter	Pemsel's adjutant
Gert Fröbe	Unteroffizier "Kaffeekanne" ("coffee pot")	Soldier, Wehrmacht
Ruth Hausmeister	Lucie Rommel	Rommel's wife
Michael Hinz	Manfred Rommel	Rommel's son

== Production ==
=== Development ===
French producer Raoul Lévy signed a deal with Simon & Schuster to purchase the filming rights to Cornelius Ryan's book The Longest Day: June 6, 1944 D-Day on March 23, 1960. After finishing The Truth, Lévy set up a deal with the Associated British Picture Corporation and got director Michael Anderson attached. Ryan would receive $100,000, plus $35,000 to write the adaptation's screenplay. Lévy intended to start production in March 1961, filming at Elstree Studios and the English and French coasts, but the project stalled when ABPC could not get the $6 million budget Lévy expected. Eventually, former 20th Century Fox mogul Darryl F. Zanuck learned about the book while producing The Big Gamble, and in December purchased Lévy's option for $175,000. Zanuck's editor friend Elmo Williams wrote a film treatment, which piqued the producer's interest and made him attach Williams to The Longest Day as associate producer and coordinator of battle episodes. Ryan was brought in to write the script, but had conflicts with Zanuck as soon as the two met. Williams was forced to act as a mediator; he would deliver Ryan's script pages to Zanuck, then return them with the latter's annotations. While Ryan developed the script, Zanuck also brought in other writers for cleanups for the various nationalities, including James Jones for the Americans, Romain Gary for the French, Noël Coward for the British and Erich Maria Remarque for the Germans. As their contributions to the finished screenplay were relatively minor, Ryan managed to get the screenplay credit after an appeal to the Writers Guild arbitration, but four other writers are credited for writing "additional episodes" in the film's closing credits.

During pre-production, producer Frank McCarthy, who had worked for the United States Department of War during World War II, arranged for military collaboration with the governments of France, Germany, the United Kingdom, and the United States. Zanuck, who was friends with Supreme Allied Commander Lauris Norstad, secured 700 United States Army Europe and Africa soldiers for use as extras. However, hundreds of these soldiers had to be recalled after the Berlin Crisis of 1961, and many Members of Congress, such as Bob Wilson, criticized the military for transferring soldiers to a film production in France during a major Cold War standoff. The Senate Subcommittee on Constitutional Rights under Sam Ervin investigated the film for allegedly forcing soldiers to appear as extras against their will. In the end, the film included 250 U.S. Army soldiers and 500 British Army soldiers as extras.

Zanuck realized that, with eight battle scenes, shooting would be accomplished more expediently if multiple directors and units worked simultaneously, so he hired German directors Gerd Oswald and Bernhard Wicki, British director Ken Annakin, and Hungarian-American director Andrew Marton. Zanuck's son Richard D. Zanuck was reluctant about the project, particularly the high budget; with a budget of $10 million ($106 million in 2025 dollars), this was the most expensive black-and-white film made until 1993, when Schindler's List was released.

=== Casting ===
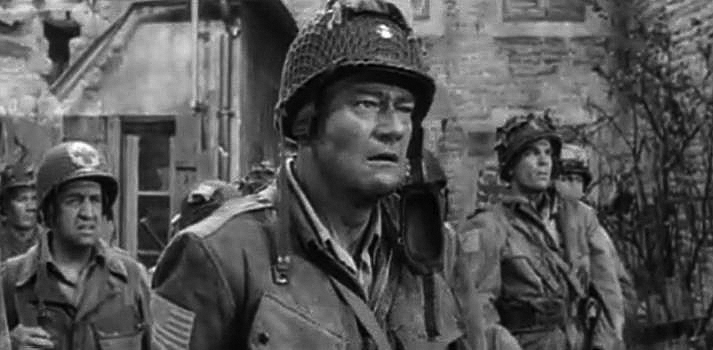
John Wayne in The Longest Day

- Jack Lord was originally cast in a starring role in the film when Levy was producing it.
- Charlton Heston, who served in the USAAF during World War II, actively sought the role of Lt. Col. Benjamin H. Vandervoort, but the last-minute decision of John Wayne, who did not serve in the war, to take the role prevented Heston's participation. At 55, Wayne was 28 years older than Vandervoort had been on D-Day (and 10 years older than Vandervoort was in 1962). All the other major actors accepted $25,000 as payment for their appearance in the film, but Wayne insisted on $250,000 to punish Zanuck for once referring to him as "poor John Wayne" when describing Wayne's problems with his lavish film The Alamo (1960).
- Pop stars Paul Anka, Tommy Sands, and Fabian appear together as Rangers in the film.
- Mel Ferrer was originally signed to play the role of Gen. James M. Gavin, but he was recast due to a scheduling conflict.
- Richard Todd played Maj. John Howard, leader of the British airborne assault on the Pegasus Bridge, and Todd himself had taken part in the real bridge assault on D-Day. He was offered the chance to play himself, but took the part of Maj. Howard instead.
- Bill Millin was the piper who accompanied Lord Lovat to Normandy with his bagpipes, and it is a common misconception that he played himself in the film. He was actually portrayed by Pipe Major Leslie de Laspee, who was the official piper to the Queen Mother at the time of filming.
- There were discussions about having former President Dwight D. Eisenhower play himself in the film, and he indicated his willingness to participate. However, it was decided that makeup artists couldn't make him appear young enough to play his World War II-era self, so the role instead went to Henry Grace, a set decorator who had been in the film industry since the mid-1930s. Grace had no acting experience, but he was a dead ringer for the younger Eisenhower (though his voice differed, so someone else dubbed his lines).
- In Sainte-Mère-Église, Pvt. John Steele from the 82nd Airborne (played by Red Buttons) has been memorialized by the local population with a dummy hanging from a parachute from the church tower on which he accidentally landed.
- According to the 2001 documentary Cleopatra: The Film That Changed Hollywood, Richard Burton and Roddy McDowall, having not been used for several weeks while filming in Rome, were so bored that they phoned Zanuck begging to do "anything" on The Longest Day. They flew themselves to the location and each filmed their cameos in a day for free.
- The film marked the last film appearance of Sean Connery before he was cast in the role of James Bond. Gert Fröbe (Sgt. Kaffeekanne) and Curd Jürgens (Gen. Günther Blumentritt) later played Bond villains Auric Goldfinger (Goldfinger) and Karl Stromberg (The Spy Who Loved Me), respectively. Prolific Q character Desmond Llewelyn had a minor role as a war correspondent. Connery played Maj. Gen. Roy Urquhart in the 1977 film A Bridge Too Far, which was also based on a book by Cornelius Ryan. Likewise, Wolfgang Preiss played Maj. Gen. Max Pemsel in The Longest Day and Field Marshal Gerd von Rundstedt in A Bridge Too Far.
- Sgt. Kaffeekanne's (Gert Fröbe) name is German for "coffee pot", which he always carries.
- Zanuck hired more than 2,000 active soldiers for the film as extras.
- Henry Fonda and John Wayne would team up again three years later to make In Harm's Way, a movie about the U.S. Navy set after the attack on Pearl Harbor.
- Robert Ryan and Edmund O'Brien would team up again seven years later to make The Wild Bunch, a movie set during the 1910 Mexican Revolution.
- One of the stuntmen on the film was Robert Weinstein (1936–2019), a French Jew who narrowly avoided the death camps. In his seventies, he wrote his memoirs with the help of Stéphanie Krug. Vent printanier was published by L'Harmattan, and was subsequently renamed L'orphelin du Vel' D'Hiv for its second edition. In it, Weinstein recounts the details of his life, including his work on this film.

=== Filming ===
- The film was shot at several French locations, including the Île de Ré, Saleccia beach in Saint-Florent, Port-en-Bessin-Huppain (filling in for Ouistreham), Les Studios de Boulogne in Boulogne-Billancourt, and the actual locations of Pegasus Bridge near Bénouville, Sainte-Mère-Église, and Pointe du Hoc.
- During the filming of the landings at Omaha Beach, the extras appearing as American soldiers did not want to jump off the landing craft into the water because they thought it would be too cold. Robert Mitchum, as Gen. Norman Cota, became disgusted with their trepidation and jumped in first, at which point they followed his example.
- The Rupert paradummies used in the film were far more elaborate and lifelike than those actually used in the decoy parachute drop (Operation Titanic), which were simply canvas or burlap sacks filled with sand. The dummies dressed in American jumpsuits were used in filming the Sainte-Mère-Église sequence. In the real operation, six Special Air Service soldiers jumped with the dummies and played recordings of loud battle noises to distract the Germans.
- In the scenes where the paratroopers land, the background noise of frogs croaking was incorrect for northern French frog species and showed that the film probably used an American recording of background night noises.
- Colin Maud lent Kenneth More, who had served as an officer in the Royal Navy during World War II, the actual shillelagh that he carried ashore during the invasion. Similarly, Richard Todd wears the beret that he actually wore on D-Day, although he changed the cap-badge to that of Maj. John Howard's regiment, the Oxfordshire and Buckinghamshire Light Infantry.
- In the film, three Free French Special Air Service paratroopers jump into France before British and American airborne landings. This is accurate. Thirty-six Free French SAS (4 sticks) jumped into Brittany (Plumelec and Duault) on June 5 at 23:30 (Operation Dingson). The first Allied soldiers killed in action were Lt. Den Brotheridge of the 2nd Ox & Bucks Light Infantry as he crossed Pegasus Bridge at 00:22 on June 6, and Corporal Émile Bouétard of the 4th Free French SAS battalion at the same time in Plumelec, Brittany.
- The United States Sixth Fleet extensively supported the filming and made available many amphibious landing ships and craft for scenes filmed in Corsica, though many of the ships were of newer vintage. The Springfield and Little Rock were World War II light cruisers extensively reconfigured into guided missile cruisers, and both were used in the shore bombardment scenes. While the USS Springfield was scrapped in 1980, the USS Little Rock is now a museum ship in Buffalo, New York.
- The film shows the attack by the 2nd Ranger Battalion on the Pointe du Hoc. The actual landings were slightly further east than shown in the film, owing to strong tides and high seas. When entering the bunker, one soldier says the guns were never installed. This is inaccurate, as the 155mm guns had been in position until a few days before D-Day, but were moved due to heavy bombing. In reality, the guns were discovered hidden a few hours later and were destroyed.
- French arms dealer and former flying ace Pierre Laureys restored and provided three Supermarine Spitfire aircraft for the scene of an attack on a German column. Laureys himself flew one of the Spitfire aircraft in the film.
- Gerd Oswald was the uncredited director of the parachute drop scenes into Sainte-Mère-Église, and Darryl F. Zanuck said he himself was the uncredited director of some pick-up interior scenes with American and British characters.
- Elmo Williams was credited as associate producer and coordinator of battle episodes. He later produced the historical World War II film Tora! Tora! Tora! (1970) for Zanuck. It depicted the Japanese surprise attack on Pearl Harbor in 1941, also using the docudrama style.

== Release ==
The film premiered in France on September 25, 1962, in the United States on October 4, and in the United Kingdom on October 23. Funds from the premieres were donated to the Salk Institute for Biological Studies and the International Rescue Committee. Because Fox was suffering due to financial losses incurred during the concurrent production of Cleopatra, the studio wanted The Longest Day to go straight into wide release to reap quick profits, but Zanuck got them to do a proper roadshow theatrical release, threatening to sell distribution rights to Warner Bros. if Fox refused to do so. The Longest Day eventually became the box office hit Fox needed, with $30.5 million in worldwide theatrical rentals on a $7.5 million budget. It was the highest-grossing black-and-white movie at the time. Zanuck's production company (DFZ Productions) received 50% of the profits, and by 1964 had received over $5.8 million.

There were special-release showings of the film in several cities in the United States at which men who had participated in D-Day were invited to see the film with their fellow soldiers. One such screening took place in Cleveland, Ohio, at the Hippodrome Theater.

The scenes in the film featuring German and French characters were shot both with them speaking their native language and with them speaking English. Almost uniquely among British- and American-produced World War II films of the time, the version of the film with foreign languages accompanied by English subtitles was more widely seen during the film's initial release. The all-English version of the film was used more extensively during the film's late 1960s re-release.

When the film was re-released in 1969, it opened at number one at the US box office with a first-week gross of $501,529. In the first four days of its worldwide re-release in 544 theatres, it grossed $2,846,627.

=== Home media ===
The film was released in widescreen with stereo surround sound on LaserDisc in 1989. A colorized version of the film was released on VHS in 1994, the 50th anniversary of the D-Day invasion. The original black-and-white version of the film was released on DVD on November 6, 2001. In 2008, 20th Century Fox released the film on Blu-ray.

== Reception ==
=== Critical response ===
The day after the film opened at the Warner Theatre in New York City, Bosley Crowther of The New York Times declared: "The total effect of the picture is that of a huge documentary report, adorned and colored by personal details that are thrilling, amusing, ironic, sad [...] It is hard to think of a picture, aimed and constructed as this one was, doing any more or any better or leaving one feeling any more exposed to the horror of war as this one does". Variety described it as "a solid and stunning war epic" that "emerges as a sort of grand scale semi-fictionalized documentary concerning the overall logistics needed for this incredible invasion".

Richard L. Coe of The Washington Post called the film "a tingling, eye-gripping, fantastic picture" that "must rank as the screen's most massive battle epic", his only criticism being "the lack of perspective in depicting the German belief that the Normandy landings might not have succeeded had Hitler not taken a sleeping pill [...] 'The Longest Day' should have taken infinitely more care to put this German belief, however strongly held, into proper proportion". Brendan Gill of The New Yorker called the film "a tour de force of audio-visual verisimilitude," but confessed that "my emotions were hardly ever engaged, and I ended, rather to my embarrassment, by being bored". He continued: "Mr. Zanuck made it all the harder for me to take this mock-documentary seriously by stuffing it with innumerable celebrated actors, most of whom make such fugitive appearances that the audience finds itself engaged in a distracting game of instant identification".

The Monthly Film Bulletin stated: "The Longest Day is a monument split down the middle by compromise. At its best, what comes across very strongly is the feeling of immense and careful organisation that went into the whole D-Day operation, the sheer crippling weight of noise, the simple fact that a lot of people died, and the sense of personal confusion and dismay of soldiers wandering alone through the countryside [...] But the film is, first and foremost, a spectacle, and therefore it has stars—a multitude of them, often with barely a line to speak, and usually with no real part to play".

In later years, critic Terrence Rafferty cited the German segments, as directed by Bernhard Wicki, to be "the best in the film, by a sizable margin."

On review aggregator website Rotten Tomatoes, the film has an approval rating of 84% based on 25 reviews, with an average score of 7.6/10. Metacritic, which uses a weighted average, assigned the film a score of 75 out of 100, based on 7 critics, indicating "generally favorable" reviews.

=== Accolades ===
Year	Award	Category	Nominee(s)	Result	Ref.
1962	35th Academy Awards	Best Picture	Darryl F. Zanuck	Nominated	
1962	35th Academy Awards	Best Art Direction, Black-and-White	Ted Haworth, Léon Barsacq, Vincent Korda and Gabriel Béchir	Nominated	
1962	35th Academy Awards	Best Cinematography, Black-and-White	Jean Bourgoin and Walter Wottitz	Won	
1962	35th Academy Awards	Best Film Editing	Samuel E. Beetley	Nominated	
1962	35th Academy Awards	Best Special Effects	Robert MacDonald and Jacques Maumont	Won	
1962	Golden Globe Award	Best Motion Picture – Drama	Darryl F. Zanuck	Nominated	
1962	Golden Globe Award	Best Cinematography - Black and White	Henri Persin, Walter Wottitz and Jean Bourgoin	Won	
1962	Eddie Awards	Best Edited Feature Film – Dramatic	Samuel E. Beetley	Won	
1962	David di Donatello	Best Foreign Production	Darryl F. Zanuck	Won	
1962	Directors Guild of America Award	Outstanding Directing – Feature Film	Ken Annakin, Andrew Marton and Bernhard Wicki	Nominated	

== See also ==
- Chanson d'automne – the Verlaine poem used as an alert code for cells of the Maquis and other French Resistance groups
- Tora! Tora! Tora! – film by Daryl F. Zanuck about the attack on Pearl Harbor that follows a similar format to The Longest Day
- The Longest Yarn – artwork based on scenes from this film

== Sources ==
- Gussow, Mel (1971). Darryl F. Zanuck: Don't Say Yes Until I Finish Talking. Da Capo Press. ISBN 978-0306801327. Archived from the original on April 27, 2021.
- Lev, Peter (2013). Twentieth Century-Fox: The Zanuck-Skouras Years, 1935–1965. University of Texas Press. ISBN 978-0292744479. Archived from the original on April 27, 2021.
- Rubin, Steven Jay (2011). Combat Films: American Realism, 1945–2010 (2nd ed.). McFarland. ISBN 978-0786486137. Archived from the original on April 27, 2021.
- Ryan, Cornelius (1959). The Longest Day (1st ed.). New York City: Simon & Schuster. ASIN B002YJG2WU. Archived from the original on March 3, 2021.
- Williams, Elmo (2006). Elmo Williams: A Hollywood Memoir. McFarland. ISBN 978-0786426218. Archived from the original on April 27, 2021.
