= Werner Pluskat =

WWII German army major

- Born: 1912
- Died: 11 June 2002 (aged 89–90); Heilbronn
- Military career
- Allegiance: Nazi Germany
- Branch: Army
- Rank: Major
- Unit: 352nd Infantry Division
- Conflicts: Operation Overlord

Werner Pluskat (1912 – 11 June 2002) was a major, commanding the 1st Battalion of the 352nd Artillery Regiment of the German 352nd Infantry Division during the Allied invasion in Normandy.

He was credited in the movie The Longest Day, a film about the D-Day invasion, with being the first German officer who saw the Allied invasion fleet on 6 June 1944, heading toward their landing zone at Omaha Beach. In an interview to the French news broadcast "Cinq Colonnes à la Une" aired on June 6, 1964 for the 20th anniversary of the Allied invasion in Normandy, Pluskat confirms this depiction: "twenty years ago, I was on this very place, as the first German officer to have witnessed the approaching of the Allied flottilla".

However, Heinrich "Hein" Severloh, a German machine gunner on Omaha Beach that day, wrote in his book WN62: A German Soldier's Memories of the Defence of Omaha Beach, Normandy, June 6, 1944 that Pluskat was not with his unit the day of the invasion and "was not truthfully portrayed" in the film. Pluskat's men fired their guns on Omaha Beach until they ran out of ammunition.

Oberleutnant (M.A.) Walter Ohmsen, commander of the Crisbecq Battery, was also credited with being the first to discover the Allied invasion fleet through the battery rangefinder.

Pluskat was with Generalleutnant Kurt Dittmar when they surrendered to soldiers of the U.S. 30th Infantry Division at Magdeburg on 23 April 1945.

For the production of The Longest Day, Pluskat was one of many Axis and Allied military consultants to have actually been on the beach on June 6. In the film, he was portrayed by Hans Christian Blech.
