= HMS Cardigan Bay =

1945 Bay-class anti-aircraft frigate of the Royal Navy

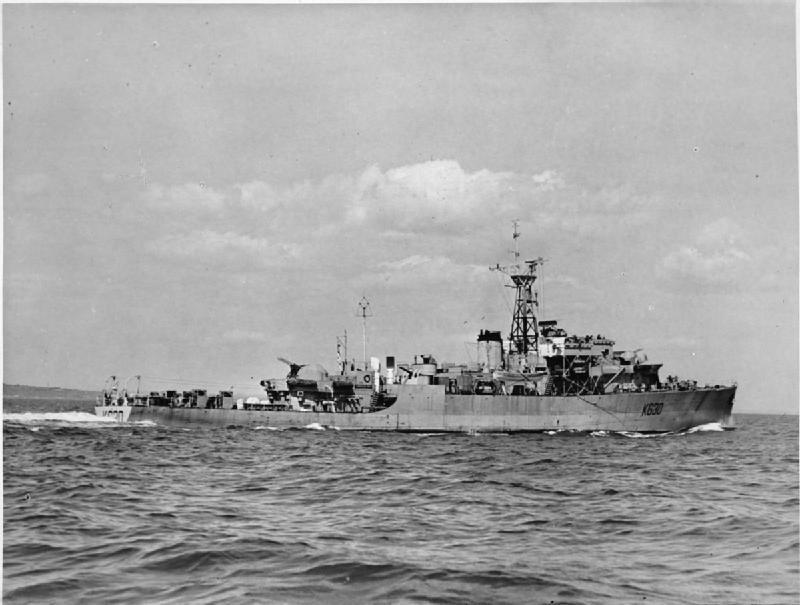
- Cardigan Bay in June 1945

History

United Kingdom
- Name: HMS Cardigan Bay
- Namesake: Cardigan Bay
- Builder: Henry Robb
- Yard number: 348
- Laid down: 14 April 1944
- Launched: 28 December 1944
- Commissioned: 25 June 1945
- Decommissioned: April 1961
- Identification: Pennant number: K630 (1945–1948); F630 (1948–1962)
- Honours and awards: Korea 1950–53
- Fate: Sold for scrapping, 1962
- Badge: On a Field, Barry wavy of 10 White and Blue, a demi-dragon erased rampant red, armed and with pointed tongue Blue.

General characteristics
- Class & type: Bay-class frigate
- Displacement: 1,600 long tons (1,626 t) standard; 2,530 long tons (2,571 t) full
- Length: 286 ft (87 m) p/p; 307 ft 3 in (93.65 m) o/a
- Beam: 38 ft 6 in (11.73 m)
- Draught: 12 ft 9 in (3.89 m)
- Propulsion: 2 × Admiralty 3-drum boilers, 2 shafts, 4-cylinder vertical triple expansion reciprocating engines, 5,500 ihp (4,100 kW)
- Speed: 19.5 knots (36.1 km/h; 22.4 mph)
- Range: 724 tons oil fuel, 9,500 nmi (17,600 km) at 12 knots (22 km/h)
- Complement: 157
- Sensors & processing systems: Type 285 fire control radar; Type 291 air warning radar; Type 276 target indication radar; High Frequency Direction Finder (HF/DF); IFF transponder
- Armament: 4 × QF 4 inch Mark XVI guns on 2 twin mounting HA/LA Mk.XIX; 4 × 40 mm Bofors A/A on 2 twin mounts Mk.V; 4 × 20 mm Oerlikon A/A on 2 twin mounts Mk.V; 1 × Hedgehog 24 barrel A/S projector; 2 rails and 4 throwers for 50 depth charges

HMS Cardigan Bay was a Bay-class anti-aircraft frigate of the British Royal Navy, named after Cardigan Bay, off the coast of Ceredigion, Wales.

The ship was originally ordered from Henry Robb of Leith in 1943 as the Loch-class frigate Loch Laxford, and laid down on 14 April 1944 as Admiralty Job No. J11861. However the contract was then changed, and the ship was revised as a Bay-class anti-aircraft frigate, and launched on 28 December 1944 as Cardigan Bay, the first Royal Navy ship to carry the name. She was completed on 15 June 1945.

== Service history ==
=== Mediterranean Fleet ===
After sea trials, on 18 August 1945 Cardigan Bay joined the Mediterranean Fleet at Malta under the command of Commander Colin Maud. She was deployed in the Aegean Sea and at Haifa to intercept immigrant ships bound for Palestine. In July 1947 she escorted Exodus 1947 to Haifa, Mandatory Palestine, after putting a boarding party aboard, and in August escorted the British merchant ships Empire Rival, Ocean Vigour and Runnymede Park to Port-de-Bouc near Marseille, taking the immigrants from Exodus 1947 back to France. In early 1948 she intercepted the Liberty ships Pan York and Pan Crescent in the Black Sea.

Cardigan Bay carried out the usual programme of Fleet exercises and visits, also deploying for surveillance operations in the Adriatic Sea following the Corfu Channel Incident, acted as guard ship at Trieste and Aqaba, and performed patrol duties in the Red Sea. In 1948 her pennant number was changed to F630.

=== Eastern Fleet ===
In July 1949, Cardigan Bay and sister ship St Brides Bay were transferred to the Eastern Fleet, based at Singapore, arriving there in August, for a series of exercises and patrols off Malaya and China, deploying on the Yangtze Patrol with St Brides Bay and the sloop Black Swan in November and December.

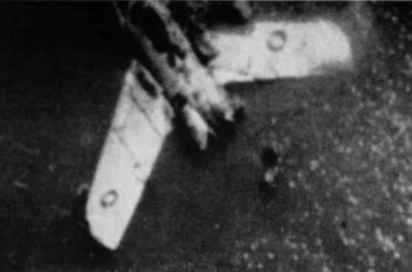
Photograph of the Mikoyan-Gurevich MiG-15 fighter that was recovered off Hanchon.

In October 1950 Cardigan Bay was detached for service with the United Nations as part of British and Commonwealth support in Korea, sailing from Hong Kong on 17 November to Sasebo to join the UN Naval Task Group. In December she sailed on her first operational deployment off the west coast of Korea supporting UN personnel at Inchon. She remained there until mid-January 1951, then returned to Sasebo. Released from UN duty, she was deployed at Hong Kong for exercises and guard ship duties until June. She then returned to Sasebo, and began her second Korean tour, patrolling the west coast, supporting the aircraft carrier Glory during coastal bombardments, and preventing movements of enemy shipping. In July she escorted an American LCU to recover wreckage from a Mikoyan MiG-15 fighter aircraft which had crashed in shallow water south-west of Hanchon. Large parts of the aircraft were recovered using the LCUs crane and smaller components by divers, while Glory and the cruiser Kenya provided radar and air cover. Further offensive patrols and survey operations in Han River estuary followed until September, when she sailed to Hong Kong to refit.

Cardigan Bay resumed service with UN Naval Task Force off Korea in January 1952 for patrol duties and naval gunfire support, until April, then sailed for Sasebo and Hong Kong for repairs and Flotilla exercises. In June she returned to Korea for further patrols and bombardments, and acted as an Air Control Ship during flying operations. Released in September she sailed for Hong Kong to refit.

Recommissioned for service in the 4th Frigate Squadron on 28 December, in January 1953 Cardigan Bay sailed on her fifth tour of service with the UN Task Group off Korea. On 7 April she embarked American General Maxwell D. Taylor and the Commander of the Commonwealth Naval Forces Admiral Alan Scott-Moncrieff, and sailed to Ch'o-do Island, close to the mouth of the Taedong River to carry out a shore bombardment. Shortly afterwards Cardigan Bay was involved in a collision with the Dutch frigate Johan Maurits van Nassau, sustaining some damage to her plating. Further damage was sustained when she was hit by the US Navy tug called in to assist. She sailed for Hong Kong in April for exercises and patrols off the west coast of Malaya supporting of operations against insurgents.

In July 1953 an armistice was agreed and hostilities in Korea ended. However Cardigan Bay was retained for occasional UN duty on the west coast of Korea into 1955, also taking part in joint exercises with the United States Navy. She spent the rest of the time deployed at Hong Kong and Singapore, patrolling off Malaya, Borneo and Indonesia. She also took part in various joint exercises with the Royal Thai Navy, Indian Navy Royal Australian Navy, Royal New Zealand Navy, and multi-national exercises with SEATO. In early 1958 she visited New Zealand, calling at Wellington and ports in South Island before resuming service with the Fleet at Singapore and Hong Kong, where she remained until November 1960.

Cardigan Bay then sailed for Australia, calling at Townsville, Queensland, then Nouméa, New Caledonia, Suva, Fiji and Apia, Samoa before refuelling at Pearl Harbor on 9 January 1961. She then sailed for San Francisco, and called at San Diego, Manzanillo, Mexico, and Puntarenas, Costa Rica before transiting the Panama Canal on 23 February. She then called at Cartagena, Colombia, Maracaibo, Venezuela, Port of Spain, Trinidad and Bermuda before finally arriving back at Plymouth on 7 April to decommission.

Cardigan Bay was put into Reserve on 30 May 1961, and was put on the Disposal List in 1962.

== Publications ==
Colledge, J. J.; Warlow, Ben (2006) [1969]. Ships of the Royal Navy: The Complete Record of All Fighting Ships of the Royal Navy from the 15th Century to the Present (3rd Rev ed.). London: Chatham Publishing. ISBN 978-1-86176-281-8. OCLC 67375475.
