= The Longest Day (book) =

1959 book by Cornelius Ryan

- First edition
- Author: Cornelius Ryan
- Language: English
- Subject: Normandy landings
- Genre: World War II history
- Publisher: Simon & Schuster
- Publication date: 1959

The Longest Day is a 1959 book by Cornelius Ryan telling the story of D-Day, the first day of the World War II invasion of Normandy. It details the coup de main operation by gliderborne troops, which captured the Caen canal and Orne river bridges (Pegasus Bridge and Horsa Bridge) before the main assault on the Normandy beaches. It sold tens of millions of copies in eighteen different languages. It is based on interviews with a cross-section of participants, including U.S., Canadian, British, French and German officers and civilians.

== Overview ==
Ryan received both financial and research assistance from the Reader's Digest, which published excerpts from the book in its June and July 1959 issues.

The book begins and ends in the village of La Roche-Guyon. The book refers to the village as being the most occupied village in occupied France and states that for each of the 543 inhabitants of La Roche-Guyon there were more than three German soldiers in the village and surrounding area. Field Marshal Erwin Rommel commander-in-chief of Army Group B had his headquarters in the castle of the village which was the seat of the Duc de La Rochefoucauld.

Ryan's book is divided into three parts: the first part is titled "The Wait", the second part is named "The Night" and the third part is named "The Day". The book includes a section on the casualties of D-Day and also lists the contributors including their service details on the day of the invasion and their occupations at the time the book was first published. Ryan dedicated his book for all the men of D-Day.

Researchers spent almost three years locating survivors of D-Day and over 3000 interviews were undertaken in the United States, Canada, Great Britain, France and Germany. 383 accounts of D-Day were used in the text of the book.

Senior Allied officers who assisted the author included General Maxwell D. Taylor, Lieutenant General James M. Gavin, Lieutenant General Sir Frederick E. Morgan and General Sir Richard Nelson Gale. German officers who assisted with the book included Generaloberst Franz Halder, Hauptmann Hellmuth Lang and General der Infanterie Günther Blumentritt. The author also used Allied and German post action reports, war diaries, histories and official records.

On 6 June 1965, the author published an article "More of The Longest Day" in Reader's Digest as a supplement.

Editor Peter Schwed gave the book its title from a comment made by the German field marshal Erwin Rommel to his aide Hauptmann Helmuth Lang on April 22, 1944: "...the first 24 hours of the invasion will be decisive...the fate of Germany depends on the outcome...for the Allies, as well as Germany, it will be the longest day."

== Reception ==
Simon & Schuster published The Longest Day: June 6, 1944 in November 1959 with a first printing of 85,000 copies. The book was reprinted numerous times as it spent twenty-two weeks on The New York Times Best Seller list

== Adaptation ==
In 1962, the book was adapted into a Hollywood film of the same name.

In May 2014, publisher Andre Deutsch released the 70th Anniversary Collector's Edition, with the addition of 120 photographs, 30 unpublished removable facsimile documents from the Cornelius Ryan Archive and cover by Brazilian photographer Rodrigo Bressane, depicting an interpretation of the iconic Helmet in Omaha Beach, as seen on the Hollywood adaptation.
