= 364th Division =

364th Division may refer to:

- 364th Infantry Division, Wehrmacht, Germany
- 364th Rifle Division, Soviet Union

== See also ==
- List of military divisions by number
- 364th (disambiguation)
