= HMS Cattistock (L35) =

Destroyer of the Royal Navy

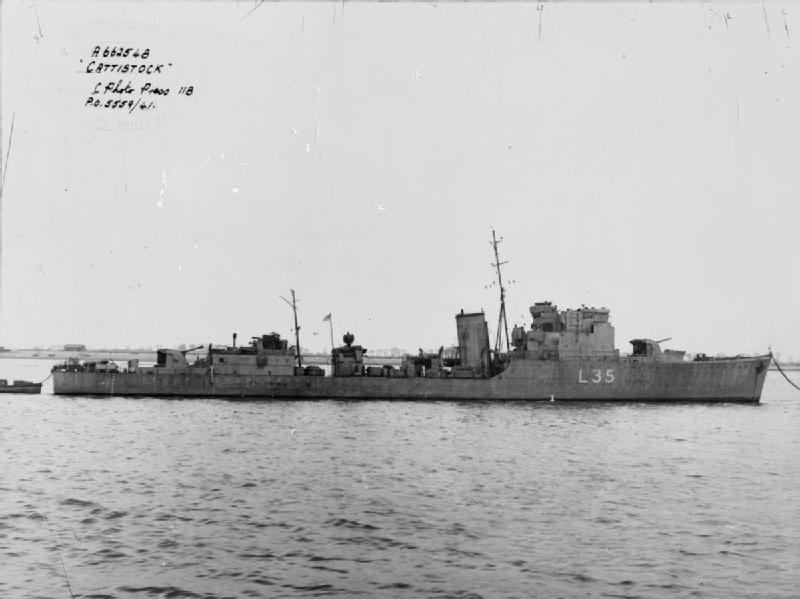

History

United Kingdom
- Name: HMS Cattistock
- Namesake: A fox hunt in Dorsetshire, England
- Builder: Yarrow, Glasgow
- Laid down: 9 June 1939
- Launched: 22 February 1940
- Completed: 22 July 1940
- Commissioned: 22 July 1940
- Decommissioned: 26 March 1946
- Identification: Pennant number: L35
- Honours and awards: Battle honours for: North Sea 1941–1945; English Channel 1942–1944; Normandy 1944
- Fate: Scrapped 1957
- Badge: On a Field Red, upon a white roundel, a Blue cornflower stalked and leaved Proper.

General characteristics
- Class & type: Hunt-class destroyer
- Displacement: 1,000 long tons (1,016 t) standard; 1,340 long tons (1,362 t) full load
- Length: 280 ft (85 m)
- Beam: 29 ft (8.8 m)
- Draught: 10 ft 9 in (3.28 m)
- Propulsion: 2 x Admiralty 3 drum boilers; 2-shaft Parsons geared turbines; 19,000 shp
- Speed: 27 1/2 kn (26 knots full)
- Range: 3,500 nmi (6,480 km) at 15 knots (28 km/h) / 1,000 nmi (2,000 km) at 26 knots (48 km/h)
- Complement: 146
- Armament: 4 × QF 4-inch (102 mm) Mark XVI guns on twin mounts Mk. XIX; 4 × QF 2-pounder (40 mm) Mk VIII AA guns on quad mount MK.VII; 2 × 20-mm Oerlikon AA guns on single mounts P Mk. III; 40 depth charges, 2 throwers, 1 rack

HMS Cattistock (L35) was a Type I Hunt-class destroyer of the Royal Navy. She was a member of the first subgroup of the Hunt class and served throughout World War II before being scrapped in 1957.

== Construction and Commissioning ==
Cattistock was ordered from Yarrows in the 1939 Build Program and laid down on 9 June 1939 as No. J1834. She was launched on 22 February 1940 and commissioned on 22 July 1940.

== Career ==
After her commissioning in July 1940, Cattistock was used as principle location for the filming of the Admiralty's Naval Instructional Film A63, "The Duties of the Helmsman" (1941). On active service, she first performed convoy escort duties in the North Sea from then to June 1941. She bombarded Dieppe with HMS Quorn and HMS Mendip on 26 July 1941, resuming convoy escort duties. In May 1944, Cattistock became part of Force G in preparation for Operation Neptune. During the landings, she escorted Convoy G1, which was composed of minesweepers. After arriving at the beaches, she deployed off Gold Beach with Bombarding Force K providing fire support to suppress beach defences in King Sector. Cattistock conducted convoy escort duties off Normandy and switched to patrols against E-boat attacks in July 1944. On 7 July 1944, she sustained slight damage after an E-boat attack.

Cattistock steamed to Portsmouth for boiler tube replacement. She resumed patrol duties on 24 August 1944. On 29 August 1944, she intercepted German naval forces attempting to escape Le Havre while patrolling with HMS Retalick. In this action, she was hit 26 times. Her captain, Lieutenant Richard Keddie, was killed along with four other men and about 25 men were wounded. As a result of the severe damage suffered, she returned to Portsmouth for repairs.

After three months of repairs, Cattistock resumed convoy escort duties. On 2 February 1945, she attacked and likely sunk a German midget submarine off Zeebrugge. In August 1945, Cattistock was transferred to the Portsmouth Local Flotilla and was paid off on 26 March 1946. She was sold for scrap after ten years in reserve in 1957. In June 1957 she arrived at the breakers yard of John Cashmore Ltd at Newport, Wales for breaking up.

The ship was featured in the 1941 Admiralty Naval Instructional film «The Duties of the Helmsman»

== Publications ==
- Colledge, J. J.; Warlow, Ben (2006) [1969]. Ships of the Royal Navy: The Complete Record of All Fighting Ships of the Royal Navy from the 15th Century to the Present (3rd Rev ed.). London: Chatham Publishing. ISBN 978-1-86176-281-8. OCLC 67375475.
- English, John (1987). The Hunts: A history of the design, development and careers of the 86 destroyers of this class built for the Royal and Allied Navies during World War II. World Ship Society. ISBN 0-905617-44-4.
