= General Anders (disambiguation) =

General Anders may refer to:

- Carl Anders (1893–1972), German Wehrmacht major general
- William Anders (born 1933), U.S. Air Force major general
- Władysław Anders (1892–1970), Polish Army lieutenant general
