= Georg Graf von Rittberg =

German general

Graf George von Rittberg
- Born: 30 May 1898; Strasbourg, Imperial Territory of Alsace-Lorraine, German Empire
- Died: 6 June 1973 (aged 75)
- Military career
- Allegiance: Nazi Germany
- Branch: Army (Wehrmacht)
- Rank: Generalleutnant
- Commands: 88th Infantry Division
- Conflicts: World War II
- Awards: Knight's Cross of the Iron Cross with Oak Leaves

George Graf von Rittberg (30 May 1898 – 6 June 1973) was a German general during World War II who commanded the 88th Infantry Division. He was a recipient of the Knight's Cross of the Iron Cross with Oak Leaves of Nazi Germany.

== Awards and decorations ==
- Iron Cross (1914) 2nd Class (June 1915) &1st Class (October 1917)
- Clasp to the Iron Cross (1939) 2nd Class (17 May 1940) & 1st Class (28 May 1940)
- German Cross in Gold on 29 January 1942 as Oberstleutnant in Artillerie-Regiment 131
- Knight's Cross of the Iron Cross with Oak Leaves
  - Knight's Cross on 21 February 1944 as Generalmajor and commander of 88. Infanterie Division
  - Oak Leaves on 10 October 1944 as Generalmajor and commander of 88. Infanterie Division

Military offices
| Preceded by Generalleutnant Heinrich Roth | Commander of 88. Infanterie-Division; 5 November 1943 – 8 January 1945 | Succeeded by Generalmajor Carl Anders |
