= 355th Infantry Division (Wehrmacht) =

- 355. Infanterie-Division
- Active: 1 May 1943 – 2 November 1943
- Country: Nazi Germany
- Branch: Army (Wehrmacht)
- Type: Infantry
- Size: Division
- Engagements: 1st Crimea; 3rd Kharkov

Commanders
- Commander: Dietrich Kraiss

The 355th Infantry Division (German: 355. Infanterie-Division) was an infantry division of the German army during World War II. It existed between May and November 1943.

== History ==
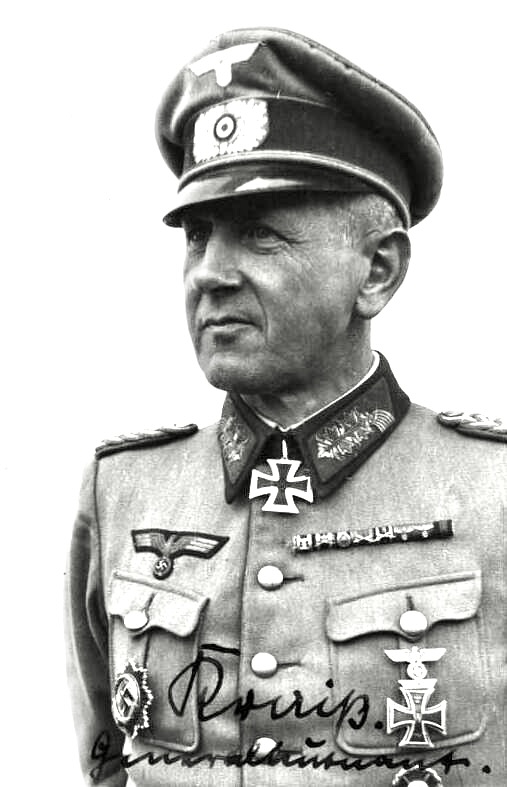
Dietrich Kraiss was the commander of the 355th Infantry Division throughout its entire six-month period of service.

The 355th Infantry Division was formed on 1 May 1943 as one of the "Gisela Divisions" in the south of German-occupied France. The Gisela Divisions (355th and 356th Infantry Divisions) had followed the "Brunhilde Division", the 282nd Infantry Division, and were so-named because of the respective codewords ("Brunhilde" and "Gisela") that had led to their assembly. The Allgemeines Heeresamt ordered the assembly of the Brunhilde Division, the 282nd, on 12 January 1943 after a directive to this effect had been issued eight days prior, on January 4. The order to assemble the 282nd Infantry Division was later extended to include the two Gisela Divisions, the 355th and 356th. For the entire duration of service, the division was led by Dietrich Kraiss, who later commanded 352nd Infantry Division, in charge of Omaha Beach on 6 June 1944.

The personnel used for the assembly of the 355th Infantry Division came from the LXIV Corps, with one company each drawn from every battalion of the 157th Reserve Division (HQ: Grenoble), 165th Reserve Division (HQ: Besançon) and 182nd Reserve Division (HQ: Nancy). Initially, the 355th Infantry Division consisted of the Grenadier Regiments 866, 867 and 868, with the former having three battalions, whereas the other two had two battalions each, for a total of seven in the division. Additionally, the division was equipped with Artillery Regiment 355, which consisted of three detachments. On 26 May 1943, the third battalion of Grenadier Regiment 866 was dissolved, with its personnel re-attached to Reserve Jäger Regiment 1. Nonetheless, the division was to be prepared, as per an order by OKH on 12 May 1943, for full combat readiness through the addition of new elements.

In June 1943, the division was transferred to Army Group A and was attached to the German forces in Crimea, where it subsequently was subordinated to XXXXII Army Corps under 8th Army. On 24/25 August, the division's strength was recorded by 8th Army as 7,500 personnel (combat strength: 3,855), 24 light field artillery and 6 heavy field artillery, 3 100mm cannons, and 39 anti-tank guns (13 medium, 26 heavy). It participated in the Crimean campaign and in the Third Battle of Kharkov before being attached to LII Corps of 1st Panzer Army in the Zaporizhzhia sector in October.

Division Group 355
- Divisionsgruppe 355
- Active: 24 November 1943 – 27 July 1944
- Country: Nazi Germany
- Branch: Army (Wehrmacht)
- Type: Infantry
- Size: Regiment

Having suffered heavy casualties at Merefa in September 1943, the division was officially dissolved on 2 November 1943 while under the command of 1st Panzer Army. The remnants of the division, which had in the final weeks been attached to 161st Infantry Division as a stopgap, formed various new elements for other forces: the staff of Division Group 355 (formed on 24 November 1943 from the staff of Regiment 866), the Regimental Group 866 and the I./335 battalion of Artillery Regiment 341 of Korps-Abteilung A. The staff of the former 355th Infantry Division were moved, along with the staff of the Panzerjäger detachment, the pioneer battalions and various supply troops, back to German-occupied France, where they were used on 21 January 1944 for the formation of 77th Infantry Division, after having been briefly earmarked for the abortive 364th Infantry Division that never saw complete assembly. Some personnel also joined the 84th Infantry Division.

The Division Group 355 existed until 27 July 1944, when it was renamed Grenadier Regiment 866. Its superior formation at the time of this final redesignation was the 161st Infantry Division.
