= List of ships in Gold Bombardment Group =

Ships supporting the 1944 Normandy landings

Below is a list of ships responsible for bombarding targets at Gold Beach as part of the Normandy landings on 6 June 1944, the opening day of Operation Overlord. This force, code-named "Bombarding Force K", and commanded by Rear Admiral Frederick Dalrymple-Hamilton of the Royal Navy, was a group of eighteen ships responsible for bombarding targets in support of the amphibious landings on Gold Beach on 6 June 1944 ("D-Day"); this was the opening day of Operation Overlord, the Allied operation that launched the successful invasion of German-occupied western Europe during World War II.

Bombarding Force K was part of Royal Navy Force G, commanded by Commodore Cyril Douglas-Pennant. This was in turn part of the Eastern Naval Task Force, under Admiral Philip Vian.

Royal Navy Bombarding Force K
Name	Type	National service	Primary target
HMS Ajax (22)	Light cruiser	Royal Navy	Longues-sur-Mer battery
HMS Argonaut (61)	Light cruiser	Royal Navy	105mm battery at Vaux (WN-50)
HMS Emerald (D66)	Light cruiser	Royal Navy	105mm battery (WN-41)
HMS Orion (85)	Light cruiser	Royal Navy	122mm battery, Mont Fleury
Flores	Gunboat	Royal Netherlands Navy	Gun position WN-39
HMS Cattistock (L35)	Destroyer	Royal Navy	Beach defenses, King sector
HMS Cottesmore (L78)	Destroyer	Royal Navy	Beach defenses, King sector
HMS Grenville (R97)	Destroyer	Royal Navy	Beach defenses, Jig sector
HMS Jervis	Destroyer flotilla leader	Royal Navy	Beach defenses, Jig sector
ORP Krakowiak (L115)	Destroyer	Polish Navy	Beach defenses, King sector
HMS Pytchley (L92)	Destroyer	Royal Navy	Beach defenses, King sector
HMS Ulster (R83)	Destroyer	Royal Navy	Beach defenses, King sector
HMS Ulysses (R69)	Destroyer	Royal Navy	Beach defenses, Jig sector
HMS Undaunted (R53)	Destroyer	Royal Navy	Beach defenses, King sector
HMS Undine (R42)	Destroyer	Royal Navy	Beach defenses, Jig sector
HMS Urania (R05)	Destroyer	Royal Navy	Beach defenses, Jig sector
HMS Urchin (R99)	Destroyer	Royal Navy	Beach defenses, King sector
HMS Ursa (R22)	Destroyer	Royal Navy	Beach defenses, King sector

== Sources ==
- Churchill, Winston (1951) [1948]. Closing the Ring. The Second World War. Vol. V. Boston: Houghton Mifflin. OCLC 396150.
- Trew, Simon (2004). Gold Beach. Battle Zone Normandy. Stroud, Gloucestershire: Sutton. ISBN 0-7509-3011-X.
