= Werner Schmidt-Hammer =

German Wehrmacht general (1894–1962)

- Born: 26 September 1894
- Died: 4 January 1962 (aged 67)
- Military career
- Allegiance: German Empire; Weimar Republic; Nazi Germany
- Branch: German Army
- Service years: 1914–1945
- Rank: Generalleutnant
- Commands: 168th Infantry Division; LXXII Army Corps
- Conflicts: World War I; World War II; Invasion of Poland; Battle of France; Operation Barbarossa; Battle of Kiev (1941); First Battle of Kharkov; Second Battle of Kharkov; Case Blue; Battle of Kursk; Belgorod-Khar'kov Offensive Operation; Battle of Kiev (1943); Hube's Pocket; Battle of the Dukla Pass; Upper Silesian Offensive; Prague Offensive
- Awards: Knight's Cross of the Iron Cross

Werner Schmidt-Hammer (26 September 1894 – 4 January 1962) was a German general in the Wehrmacht during World War II. He was a recipient of the Knight's Cross of the Iron Cross of Nazi Germany.

Schmidt-Hammer surrendered to the Red Army in the course of the Soviet Prague Offensive in May 1945. Convicted as a war criminal in the Soviet Union, he was held until October 1955.

== Awards and decorations ==
- Knight's Cross of the Iron Cross on 12 September 1944 as Generalleutnant and commander of 168. Infanterie-Division

Military offices
Preceded by Generalleutnant Walter Chales de Beaulieu	Commander of 168. Infanterie-Division; 1 December 1943 – 8 September 1944	Succeeded by Generalmajor Carl Anders
Preceded by Generalmajor Carl Anders	Commander of 168. Infanterie-Division; 9 December 1944 – 6 January 1945	Succeeded by Generalmajor Dr. Maximilian Roßkopf
Preceded by Generalmajor Dr. Maximilian Roßkopf	Commander of 168. Infanterie-Division; April 1945	Succeeded by None
Preceded by General der Infanterie Anton Grasser	Commander of LXXII. Armeekorps; April 1945 – 8 May 1945	Succeeded by None
