= 88th Infantry Division (Wehrmacht) =

- German: 88. Infanterie-Division
- 88. Infantry Division, vehicle insignia
- Active: 1 December 1939 - 27 January 1945
- Country: Nazi Germany
- Branch: Army
- Type: Infantry
- Size: Division
- Engagements: World War II: Battle of France; Case Blue; Second Battle of Kharkov; Battle of the Korsun-Cherkassy Pocket; Lvov–Sandomierz Offensive

Commanders
- Notable commanders: Generalleutnant Georg Graf von Rittberg

The 88th Infantry Division (German: 88. Infanterie-Division) was a major fighting formation of the German Army (Wehrmacht). It was created in December 1939, and first saw combat in the Battle of France, and was then posted to security duties. From December 1941, the division was shifted to the southern sector of the Eastern Front, where it fought until February 1944 when it was encircled near Cherkassy and virtually destroyed.

== Organisation ==
The 88th Infantry Division was a unit of the 6th wave of army mobilisation. Due to the rapid expansion of the Army at the declaration of war, there was not enough German equipment available to meet demand, and the divisions of the 6th wave were issued with weapons and equipment of Czech origin. Upon formation, the division had the following sub units:

- Grenadier-Regiment 245
- Grenadier-Regiment 246
- Grenadier-Regiment 248
- Artillery-Regiment 188
- Anti-tank Battalion 188
- Bicycle-Squadron 188
- Pionier Battalion 188
- Signals Battalion 188
- Divisional Services 188

In November 1943 the division was restructured. One of its regiments, the 248, was disbanded entirely, and the remnants of the (also disbanded) 323 ID was incorporated to replace it. This was called the 323 division group of regimental size and the 591 and 593 as battalion sized 'regimental groups'. This is an expedient that was used in the creation of the Korps abteilung. The other battalions of the division were reshuffled, to leave two regiments of two battalions each and a divisional fusilier battalion. This left the 88th division with seven infantry battalions in line with the 44 division organisation and structure.

== Operational history ==
By May 1940 the division was deemed ready for combat, transferred to the western front and subsequently took part in the battle for France. Soon after the battle, the division was sent back to southern Germany for further training, and some of its personnel were allowed to return to their peacetime professions in industry and agriculture. In the winter of 1941 the division was posted to the Soviet Union, and took part in the winter defensive battles of Army Group South, in line between Belgorod and Kursk.

=== Kharkov 1942 ===
In May 1942, the Soviets launched a new offensive effort aimed at retaking Kharkov in a pincer move. The southern group attacked from the great bulge in the line west of Izyum, backed up by two of the newly created Tank Corps (23rd & 21st) and 6th Cavalry Corps and the northern grouping attacked on a more direct line using the 38th, 21st and 28th Armies backed up by 3rd Guards Cavalry Corps. The northern group attack began on 13 May with some limited successes. German reaction was swift: using infantry and 3rd and 23rd Panzer divisions, part of the forces gathered for the summer offensive, they hit the northern attack with repeated counterattacks, whilst blocking advancement in the south. As part of these efforts, a two-regimental group from 88th infantry division (Combat Group Gollwitzer) was shifted to the area and joined in these attacks from the northern flank. With their attack obviously going nowhere, the Russians abandoned the attack and had withdrawn their offensive groupings by 24 May 1942.

Following this action, the 88th Division then took part in the opening stages of Plan Blue, the German summer offensive. After only a short advance, the division was again put on the defensive on the northern flank of the 9th Army, where it remained for several months. In January 1943, after the Stalingrad debacle, Russian offensives rippled along the front. The 9th Army front was breached and it was forced to retreat, the 88th Division with it.

After the front was finally stabilised for the Germans by Erich von Manstein counter stroke at Kharkov, the 88th division was again in defensive positions, this time along the Minus river, whilst dramatic events unfolded around the Kursk salient. The failure of the German offensive preceded the start of a prolonged period of Soviet attacks, and by September, von Manstein was no longer confident that the forces of AGS could defeat them without substantial reinforcement. Hitler thereafter authorised the withdrawal to the Panther line on 15 September. A race to the Dnieper followed: both German and Soviet forces raced to reach the river first, with the German forces attempting to fully man defensive fortifications ahead of the arrival of the bulk of the Soviet forces.

The 88th pulled back and crossed the river Dnieper as part of VII Armycorps, and was inserted into the new defensive line on the western bank. The German forces were unable to prevent the Red Army from seizing several bridgeheads across the river.

=== Poland ===
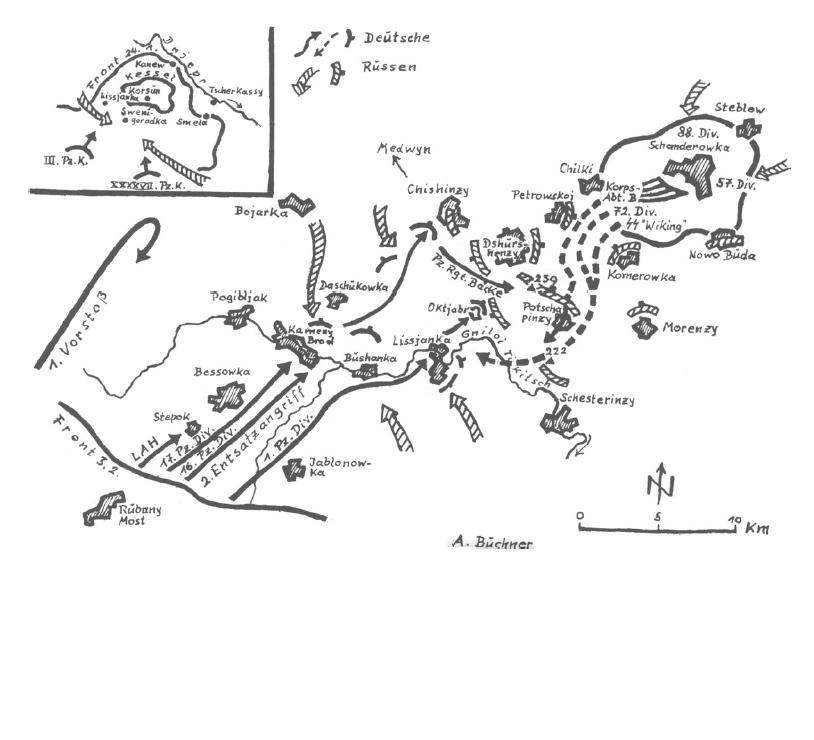
88. ID shown in the northern sector during the German breakout attempt

After the break out from Cherkassy, the division was quickly rebuilt, and by June 1944 was back in line under the 4th Panzer Army, Army Group North Ukraine. In mid-July, Soviet 1st Ukrainian Front started a series of offensives and the German forces were driven back into southern Poland. This was a time of constant retreat for the 88th division as the front was pulled back time after time, but after considerable effort the Germans finally managed to stabilize the front by September. Although the 88th avoided encirclement in these battles, it suffered considerable casualties and was down to a 'Kampfgruppe' by mid August.

The decimated 88th division was to remain static for over 3 months.

On 1 January 1945, the division, then under command of the 4th Panzer Army of Army Group A, had a strength of 10,662 men.

The division finally met its fate in January 1945, when Soviet armies were unleashed with overwhelming odds and much of Army Group A, of which the 88th division was now a part, was overwhelmed and destroyed. This was the last action of the division; its remnants were listed as fighting with battle group Jauer at the end of January. The division was finally disbanded later in 1945, with its survivors absorbed by other units.

== Commanding officers ==
- Generalmajor Georg Lang, 1 December 1939 – 2 February 1940.
- General der Infanterie Friedrich Gollwitzer, 2 February 1940 – 10 March 1943.
- Generalleutnant Heinrich Roth, 10 March 1943 – 5 November 1943.
- Generalleutnant Georg Graf von Rittberg, 5 November 1943 – 8 January 1945.
- Generalmajor Carl Anders, 8 January 1945 – 27 January 1945.
