= Dietrich Kraiss =

German general

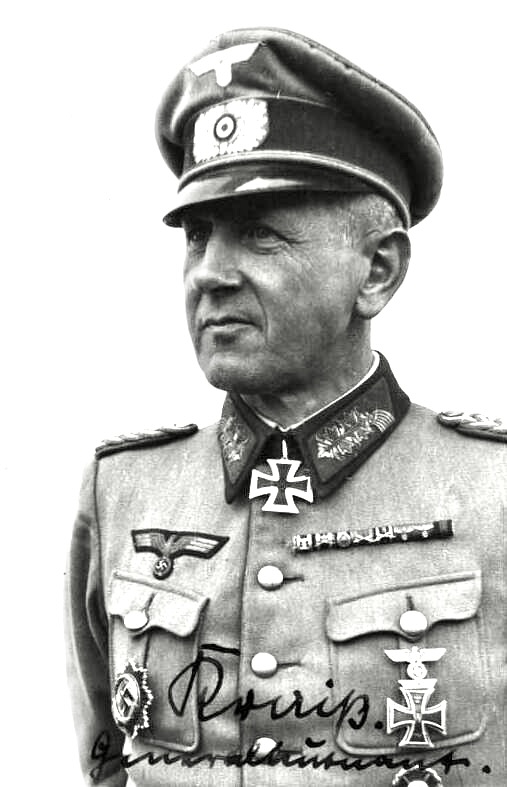
- Kraiss in 1942
- Born: 16 November 1889; Stuttgart, Germany
- Died: 6 August 1944 (aged 54) near Saint-Lô, France
- Military career
- Allegiance: German Empire; Weimar Republic; Nazi Germany
- Branch: Army of Württemberg; German Army
- Service years: 1909–1944
- Rank: Generalleutnant
- Conflicts: World War I; World War II; Invasion of Poland; Battle of France; Operation Barbarossa; Third Battle of Kharkov; Normandy Landings; Battle of Saint-Lô (KIA)
- Awards: Knight's Cross of the Iron Cross with Oak Leaves

Dietrich Kraiss (16 November 1889 – 6 August 1944) was a German general during World War II. He was a recipient of the Knight's Cross of the Iron Cross with Oak Leaves of Nazi Germany.

== Military career ==
=== World War I ===
On 24 March 1909 Kraiss was commissioned into the Kingdom of Württemberg’s 8th infantry regiment "Grand Duke Friedrich of Baden", No. 126. Serving with this regiment, he commanded a platoon and then a company in the First World War on the Western Front. On June 18, 1915, he was promoted to first lieutenant and on July 15, 1918 Hauptmann (Captain). For his services during the war, Kraiss was awarded the 1st and 2nd classes of the Iron Cross, the House Order of Hohenzollern with swords, the Order of the Zähringer Lion Knight Second Class, the Military Merit Order of Württemberg and the Wound Badge in black.

=== Inter-war years ===
After the war, Kraiss was a company commander in various infantry regiments in the Reichswehr. From 1925 to 1928 he served as an instructor in an infantry school in Dresden. On May 1, 1931, he was promoted to major and was transferred to the Ministry of the Reichswehr in Berlin, he remained there until the end of 1934. On October 1, 1934, he was promoted to Oberstleutnant (Lieutenant colonel) and commanded a battalion in his native Württemberg. In March 1937 he was promoted to Oberst (Colonel) and was given command of an infantry regiment in Hamburg in October of the same year.

=== World War II ===
At the outbreak of the Second World War Kraiss commanded a regiment and participated in the Invasion of Poland. Afterward, his unit was relocated back to Germany in preparation for the Invasion of France. From May 1940, the regiment was a part of the 20th Infantry Division during the occupation of the Netherlands and France. He was promoted to major general on 1 February 1941. In March 1941, he handed command of the regiment to Colonel Erich Jaschke and was briefly transferred into the Führerreserve.

From July 1941 to March 1943 Kraiss was given command of the 168th Infantry Division and participated in Operation Barbarossa. For his leadership of the division during the Third Battle of Kharkov, he was awarded the Knight's Cross of the Iron Cross. On October 1, 1942, he received his final promotion to the rank of lieutenant general. In April 1943 Kraiss took over the newly established 355th Infantry Division, which sustained heavy losses during action against the Red Army at Merefa and was subsequently disbanded on 9 November 1943.

From November 1943 onwards he was in command of the newly established 352nd Infantry Division, which with six other divisions, was located in Normandy in front of the Allied invasion. The division was sent to the coastal areas after Allied forces landed on the beaches Omaha and Gold. Against the orders of Adolf Hitler, Kraiss moved his division back to a defensive line about 20 kilometers away from the coast. There he was able to resist Allied forces in this section for several weeks.

Kraiss suffered a severe wound on August 2, 1944, near Saint-Lô, and died on 6 August. He was posthumously awarded the Knight's Cross of the Iron Cross with Oak Leaves on August 11, 1944.

== Awards and decorations ==
- Clasp to the Iron Cross (1939) 2nd Class (18 September 1939) & 1st Class (3 October 1939)
- German Cross in Gold on 28 February 1942 as Generalmajor and commander of the 168. Infanterie-Division
- Knight's Cross of the Iron Cross with Oak Leaves
  - Knight's Cross on 23 July 1942 as Generalmajor and commander of 168. Infanterie-Division
  - Oak Leaves on 11 August 1944 as Generalleutnant and commander of 352. Infanterie-Division
