= 168th Infantry Division (Wehrmacht) =

- 168. Infanterie-Division
- Active: December 1939 – May 1945
- Country: Nazi Germany
- Branch: Army (Wehrmacht)
- Type: Infantry
- Size: Division
- Engagements: Battle of Kiev (1941); Second Battle of Kharkov; Kamenets-Podolsky pocket

Commanders
- Notable commanders: Dietrich Kraiss; Werner Schmidt-Hammer; Carl Anders

The 168th Infantry Division (German: 168. Infanterie-Division) was an infantry division of the German Heer during World War II. It was active between 1939 and 1945.

== History ==
The 168th Infantry Division was formed in the Görlitz area on 1 December 1939 as a division of the seventh Aufstellungswelle. It initially consisted of the Infantry Regiments 417 and 429, as well as the Light Artillery Detachment 248. The latter was soon transferred to the 164th Infantry Division, and the 168th was strengthened to full division strength by the addition of a third regiment, numbered 442, and a full Artillery Regiment, numbered 248. The division's deployment took from December 1939 until May 1940. During this time, the 168th Infantry Division remained at home, in Wehrkreis VIII in Silesia. The first divisional commander was Wolf Boysen.

On 11 January 1940, Hans Mundt replaced Boysen as divisional commander.

In June 1940, the 168th Infantry Division was moved to the reserves of the 1st Army (Army Group C) during the Battle of France. After that campaign's conclusion, the 168th Infantry Division was placed in occupied Poland under the supervision of the XXXXIV Army Corps, which was in turn part of the 18th Army (Army Group B). The 168th Infantry Division remained in Poland between July 1940 and May 1941, at times part of the XXXXIV, XVII, and XXIX Corps, which were in turn at times part of the 18th, 12th, 17th and 6th Armies.

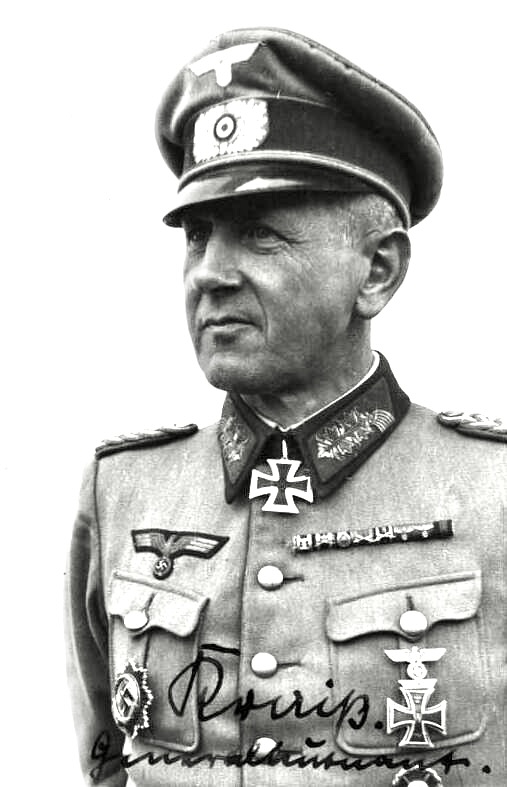
Dietrich Kraiss, divisional commander of the 168th Infantry Division between July 1941 and March 1943.

In June 1941, during the beginning of Operation Barbarossa, the 168th Infantry Division was subordinate to the XXIX Army Corps under the 6th Army, which was part of Army Group South. During the subsequent invasion of the Soviet Union, the 168th stood in the Lublin area in June 1941, moved to the Zhytomyr area in July, then advanced, as part of the XXXIV Army Corps, to the Kiev region in August and September. There, the 168th Infantry Division took part in the Battle of Kiev of 1941. The division's command had by then been taken over by Dietrich Kraiss, who began his tenure on 8 July.

After operations as part of the XXIX Army Corps in the Romny area in October and under LI Army Corps in the Belgorod area in November, the 168th Infantry Division spent the end of the year 1941 in the Kharkiv region, again part of the XXIX Army Corps.

Combat in the Kharkiv area dragged on until July 1942. The 168th Infantry Division spent this entire time nominally as part of the XXIX Army Corps, but its forces were heavily subdivided and distributed in parts to the XXXXVIII Corps and the LV Corps, both under the 2nd Army, between January and April 1942. In May 1942, the 168th Infantry Division fought in the Second Battle of Kharkov. In August, the division, again as a whole, was moved out of the 6th Army for the first time since before the beginning of the invasion of the Soviet Union. It was briefly deployed to the Voronezh region as part of the VII Army Corps under the 2nd Army (Army Group B), before being reassigned again to serve under the XXIV Army Corps, which in turn was part of the Hungarian Second Army at the Don River. The 168th Infantry Division remained part of the XXIV Army Corps between September and December 1942.

In January 1943, the 168th Infantry Division was assigned to the Fourth Hungarian Corps at the Don, before serving under Corps Cramer in February and under Corps Raus (Army Detachment Kempf, Army Group South) in the Myrhorod region in March. On 9 March, Walter Chales de Beaulieu assumed divisional command of the 168th Infantry Division.

In June, the 168th was reassigned to the XI Army Corps (Army Detachment Kempf). The division returned to the Belgorod area, where it had already fought as part of the LI Army Corps in November 1941. After brief service as part of the III Army Corps in July, the 168th Infantry Division, now again part of the XI Army Corps, was moved once more to the Kharkiv area. The German defeat at the Battle of Kursk cause a wave of German retreats during which the 168th Infantry Division suffered heavy casualties. In September 1943, the XI Army Corps, with the 168th Infantry Division under it, was assigned to the 8th Army and deployed to the Kiev area, where the 168th Infantry Division was again placed under the III Army Corps in October.

On 1 December 1943, Werner Schmidt-Hammer assumed command of the 168th Infantry Division.

Between November 1943 and February 1944, the 168th Infantry Division served under the 4th Panzer Army as part of the XXIV Army Corps. During this period, the XXIV Corps was active in the Kiev, Shitomir and Vinnytsia areas. Near Cherkasy, the 168th Infantry Division was battered by heavy Soviet attacks after it was trapped in the Korsun–Cherkassy Pocket. In March 1944, the XXIV Army Corps was reassigned, along with the 168th Division, to the 1st Panzer Army in the Kamianets-Podilskyi region. Here, the 168th Infantry Division was again trapped by enemy forces, this time the Kamenets-Podolsky pocket. Afterwards, the division was briefly allowed to return to Poland to rebuild its strength, but the formation never again exceeded Kampfgruppe strength.

Between April and June 1944, the 168th Infantry Division was part of the XXXXVI Corps in the Ternopil area. The corps was still part of the 1st Panzer Army, but the army was now part of the newly formed Army Group North Ukraine. Between July and September 1944, the 168th Infantry Division was part of the XI Army Corps in the Carpathian Mountains. On 8 September 1944, Carl Anders took command of the division from Schmidt-Hammer.

In October, the 168th was assigned to the XXXXIX Army Corps, still under the 1st Panzer Army, but now as part of Army Group A. Between November and December, the 168th served again as part of the XI Army Corps. Anders was replaced as divisional commander by Schmidt-Hansen, who started his second tenure in this post, on 9 December 1944.

On 1 January 1945, the division, then under command of the 4th Panzer Army of Army Group A, had a strength of 9,978 men.

In January 1945, the 168th Infantry Division was subordinate to the XXXXVIII Corps under the 4th Panzer Army in the Baranów area. After Maximilian Rosskopf had briefly taken command of the division on 6 January 1945, Schmidt-Hammer assumed command for the third and final time on 19 February.

Between February and May 1945, the 168th Infantry Division spent the last months of the war in Silesia, the same area in which it was originally formed. The final formation that the 168th served under was the XXXX Corps, part of the 17th Army. The final commander of the division was one Oberst Hansen, who took charge of the division in the last few days of the war, as late as May 1945.

== Noteworthy individuals ==
- Wolf Boysen, divisional commander starting 1 December 1939.
- Hans Mundt, divisional commander starting 11 January 1940.
- Dietrich Kraiss, divisional commander starting 8 July 1941.
- Walter Chales de Beaulieu, divisional commander starting 9 March 1943.
- Werner Schmidt-Hammer, divisional commander starting 1 December 1943, starting on 9 December 1944, and starting on 19 February 1945.
- Carl Anders, divisional commander starting 8 September 1944.
- Maximilian Rosskopf, divisional commander starting 6 January 1945.
