= Carl Anders =

German general

- Born: 31 August 1893
- Died: 28 January 1972 (aged 78)
- Military career
- Allegiance: Nazi Germany
- Branch: Army
- Rank: Generalmajor
- Commands: 168th Infantry Division; 88th Infantry Division
- Conflicts: World War II Vistula–Oder Offensive
- Awards: Knight's Cross of the Iron Cross

Carl Ulrich Ernst Paul Anders (31 August 1893 – 28 January 1972) was a German general in the Wehrmacht of Nazi Germany during World War II who commanded several infantry divisions. He was a recipient of the Knight's Cross of the Iron Cross of Nazi Germany.

Anders surrendered to the Red Army in the course of the Soviet 1945 Vistula–Oder Offensive. Convicted as a war criminal in the Soviet Union, he was held until 1955.

== Awards and decorations ==
- Wehrmacht Long Service Award
- Clasp to the Iron Cross (1939) 2nd Class (25 September 1939) & 1st Class (26 October 1939)
- German Cross in Gold on 14 February 1942 as Oberstleutnant in Infanterie-Regiment 484
- Knight's Cross of the Iron Cross on 4 May 1944 as Oberst and commander of Infanterie-Regiment 484

Military offices
Preceded by Generalleutnant Werner Schmidt-Hammer	Commander of 168. Infanterie-Division; 8 September 1944 – 9 December 1944	Succeeded by Generalleutnant Werner Schmidt-Hammer
Preceded by Generalleutnant Georg Graf von Rittberg	Commander of 88. Infanterie-Division; 8 January 1945 – 27 January 1945	Succeeded by none
