= Gold Beach =

Code name for an amphibious landing zone on D-Day

- Part of the Normandy landings
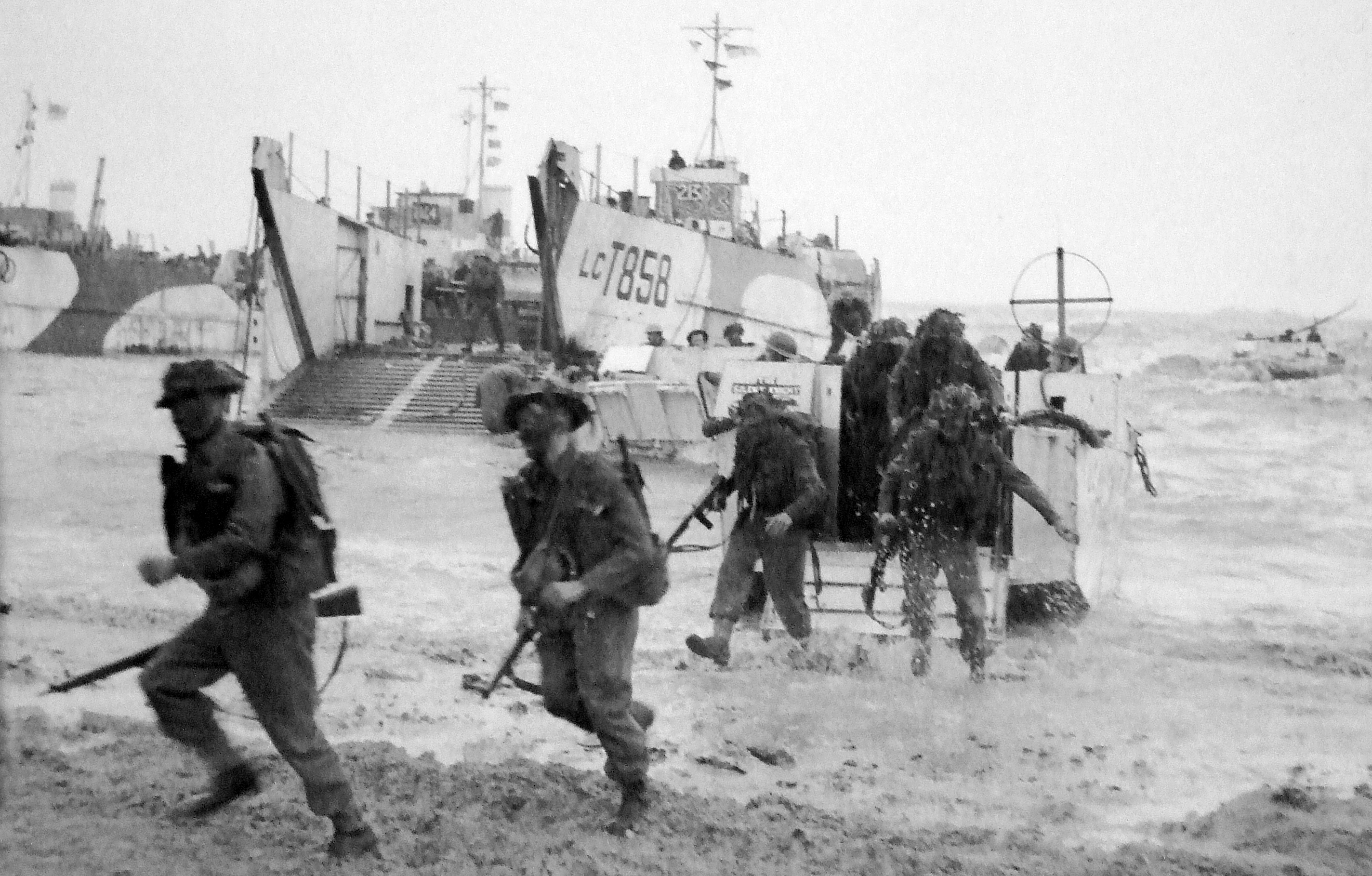
- Men of No. 47 Commando landing on Gold near La Rivière
Date	6 June 1944
Location	Arromanches-les-Bains, Le Hamel, and Ver-sur-Mer (La Rivière) in France 49°20′43″N 0°34′18″W
Result	Allied victory

Belligerents
United Kingdom; Poland; Netherlands	Germany

Commanders and leaders
(United Kingdom) Douglas Alexander Graham; (United Kingdom) Cyril Douglas-Pennant	(Nazi Germany) Dietrich Kraiss; (Nazi Germany) Wilhelm Richter

Units involved
(United Kingdom) XXX Corps: 50th Infantry Division; 8th Armoured Brigade; 56th Infantry Brigade; No. 47 Commando	(Nazi Germany) LXXXIV Corps: 352nd Infantry Division; 716th Static Division

Casualties and losses
1,000–1,100 (350 killed)	Unknown

Gold, commonly known as Gold Beach, was the code name for one of the five areas of the Allied invasion of German-occupied France in the Normandy landings on 6 June 1944, during the Second World War. Gold, the central of the five areas, was located between Port-en-Bessin on the west and the Lieu-dit La Rivière in Ver-sur-Mer on the east. High cliffs at the western end of the zone meant that the landings took place on the flat section between Le Hamel and La Rivière, in the sectors code-named Jig and King. Taking Gold was to be the responsibility of the British Army, with sea transport, mine sweeping, and a naval bombardment force provided by the Royal Navy as well as elements from the Dutch, Polish and other Allied navies.

The objectives at Gold were to secure a beachhead, move west to capture Arromanches and establish contact with the American forces at Omaha, capture Bayeux and the small port at Port-en-Bessin, and to link up with the Canadian forces at Juno to the east. Forces attacking Gold faced elements of the German 352nd Infantry Division and German 716th Infantry Division. About 2,000 men were stationed in the immediate area. Improvements to fortifications along the Normandy coast had been undertaken under the leadership of Generalfeldmarschall Erwin Rommel beginning in October 1943.

On D-Day at Gold, naval bombardment got underway at 05:30, and amphibious landings commenced at 07:25. High winds made conditions difficult for the landing craft, and the amphibious DD tanks were released close to shore or directly on the beach instead of further out as planned. Three of the four guns in a large emplacement at the Longues-sur-Mer battery were disabled by direct hits from the cruisers Ajax and Argonaut at 06:20. The fourth gun resumed firing intermittently in the afternoon, and its garrison surrendered on 7 June. Aerial attacks had failed to hit the Le Hamel strongpoint, which had its embrasure facing east to provide enfilade fire along the beach and had a thick concrete wall on the seaward side. Its 75 mm gun continued to do damage until 16:00, when an Armoured Vehicle Royal Engineers (AVRE) tank fired a large petard bomb into its rear entrance. A second casemated emplacement at La Rivière containing an 88 mm gun was neutralised by a tank at 07:30.

Meanwhile, infantry began clearing the heavily fortified houses along the shore and advanced on targets further inland. The British Commandos of No. 47 (Royal Marine) Commando advanced on Port-en-Bessin and captured it on 7 June in the Battle of Port-en-Bessin. On the western flank, the 1st Battalion, Hampshire Regiment captured Arromanches (future site of one of the artificial Mulberry harbours), and 69th Infantry Brigade on the eastern flank made contact with the Canadian forces at Juno. Company sergeant major Stanley Hollis received the only Victoria Cross awarded on D-Day for his actions while attacking two pillboxes at the Mont Fleury battery. Due to stiff resistance from the German 352nd Infantry Division, Bayeux was not captured until the next day. British casualties at Gold are estimated at 1,000–1,100. German casualties are unknown.

== Background ==
=== Operation Overlord ===
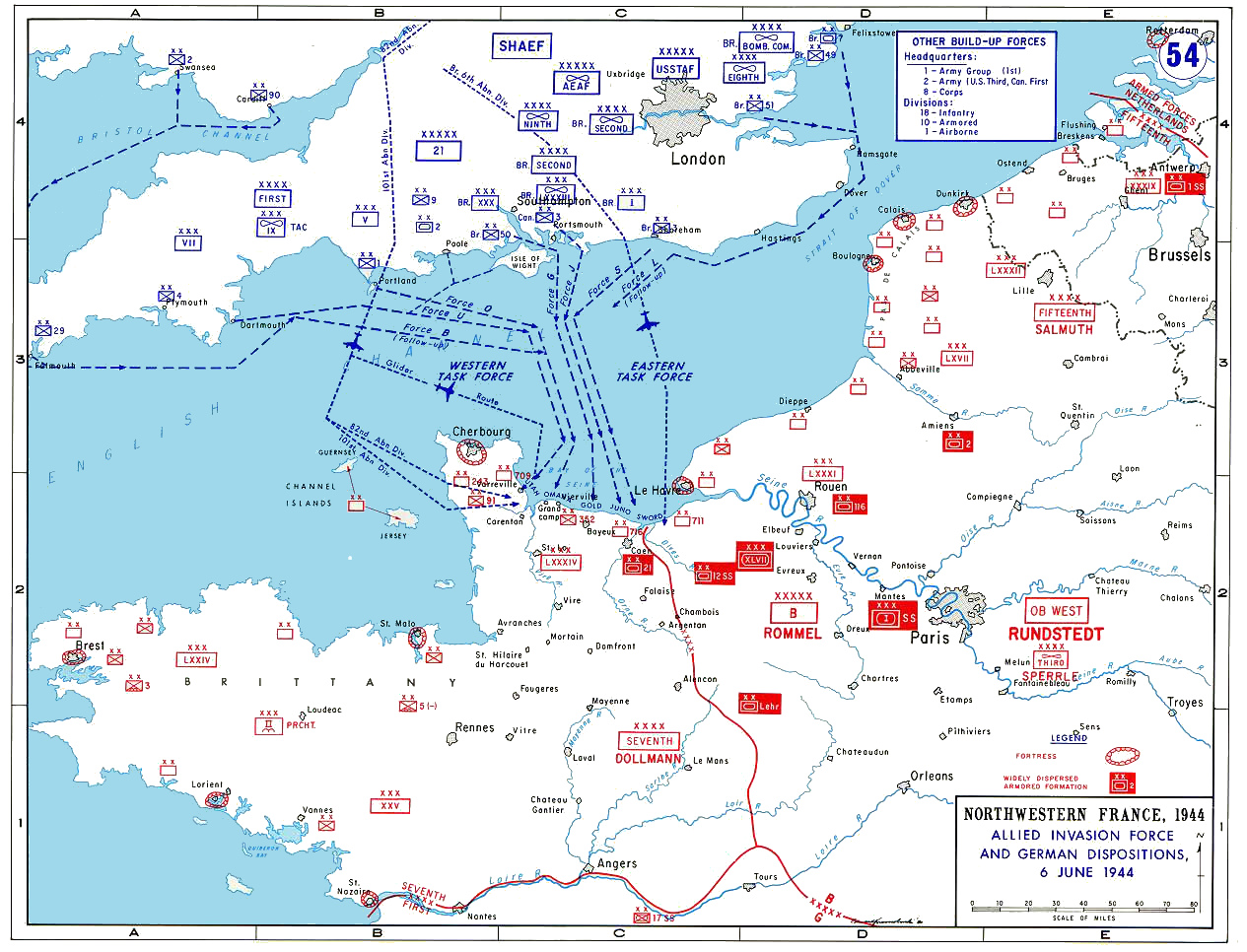
Allied invasion plans and German preparations in Normandy

After the Germans invaded the Soviet Union in June 1941, Soviet leader Joseph Stalin began pressing for the creation of a second front in Western Europe. The decision to undertake a cross-channel invasion of continental Europe within the next year was taken at the Trident Conference, held in Washington in May 1943. The Allies initially planned to launch the invasion on 1 May 1944, and a draft of the plan was accepted at the Quebec Conference in August 1943. General Dwight D. Eisenhower was appointed commander of Supreme Headquarters Allied Expeditionary Force (SHAEF). General Bernard Montgomery was named as commander of the 21st Army Group, which comprised all of the land forces involved in the invasion.

On 31 December 1943, Eisenhower and Montgomery first saw the plan, which proposed amphibious landings by three divisions and two-thirds of an airborne division. The two generals immediately insisted that the scale of the initial invasion be expanded to five divisions, with airborne descents by three divisions, to allow operations on a wider front. The change doubled the frontage of the invasion from 25 miles (40 km) to 50 miles (80 km). This would allow for quicker offloading of men and materiel, make it more difficult for the Germans to respond, and speed up the capture of the port at Cherbourg. The need to acquire or produce extra landing craft and troop carrier aircraft for the expanded operation meant that the invasion had to be delayed to June.

The Americans, assigned to land at Utah and Omaha, were to cut off the Cotentin Peninsula and capture the port facilities at Cherbourg. The British at Sword and Gold, and the Canadians at Juno, were to capture Caen and form a front line from Caumont-l'Éventé to the south-east of Caen to protect the American flank, while establishing airfields near Caen. Possession of Caen and its surroundings would provide a suitable staging area for a push south to capture the town of Falaise. A secure lodgement would be established and an attempt made to hold all territory north of the Avranches-Falaise line during the first three weeks. The Allied armies would then swing left to advance towards the River Seine. Montgomery envisaged a ninety-day battle, ending when all the forces reached the Seine.

=== Allied planning ===
Originally, seventeen sectors along the Normandy coastline had been selected as possible invasion sites and each were provided with a code name taken from one of the spelling alphabets of the time. The coast was divided between Able, west of Omaha, to Rodger on the eastern flank of the invasion area. Eight further sectors were added when the planned invasion was extended to include Utah. Each sector was further subdivided into beaches identified by the colours Green, Red, and White. Gold did not refer to a particular beach but to a landing area. It was delineated by Port-en-Bessin on the west and La Rivière on the east, and included Arromanches, location of one of the artificial Mulberry harbours that were to be constructed shortly after the invasion. High cliffs at the western end of the zone meant that the landings would be undertaken on the flat beach between Le Hamel and La Rivière, in the sectors code-named Jig and King. The area immediately behind the beach was marshy, with open ground and bocage (small fields surrounded by hedges and embankments) further inland. Roads led to the south via Asnelles and Ver-sur-Mer. The terrain to the south-east rose to a ridge at Meuvaines, where on D-Day were located machine gun nests of the German 726th Regiment.

The Allied Expeditionary Air Force (AEAF) undertook over 3,200 photo reconnaissance sorties from April 1944 until the start of the invasion. Photos of the coastline were taken at extremely low altitude to show the invaders the terrain, obstacles on the beach, and defensive structures, such as bunkers and gun emplacements. Inland terrain, bridges, troop emplacements, and buildings were also photographed, in many cases from several angles, to give the Allies as much information as possible. Members of Combined Operations Pilotage Parties clandestinely prepared detailed harbour maps, including depth soundings. At Gold, frogmen discovered the shore between Asnelles and La Rivière was soft and could not support the weight of tanks. Twelve Armoured Vehicle Royal Engineers (AVREs) were fitted with bobbins to overcome this problem by deploying a roll of matting over the soft surface. The material would then be left in place to create a route for more conventional tanks.

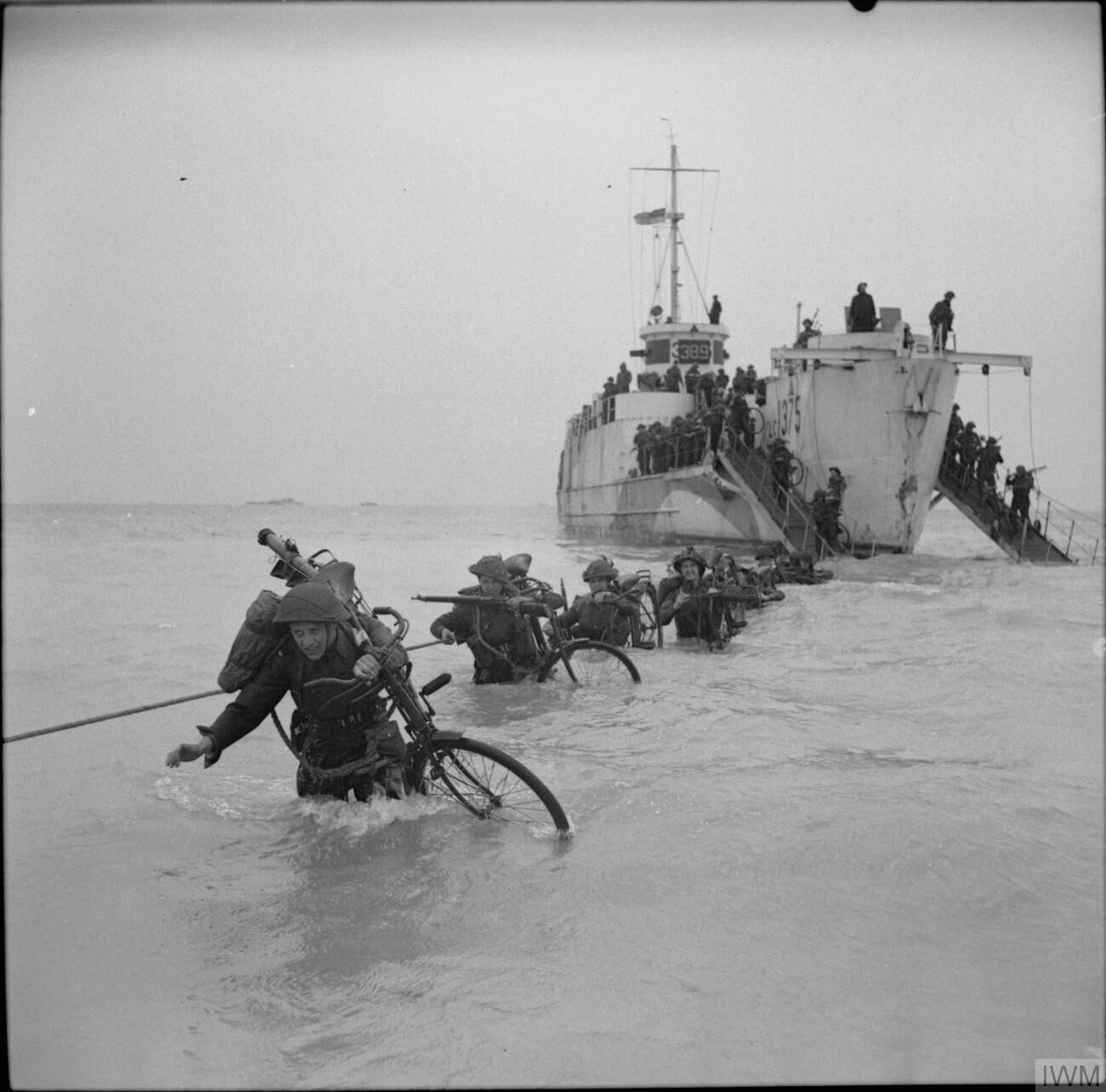
British troops wade ashore during Exercise Fabius, 6 May 1944.

Gold was assigned to Lieutenant General Gerard Bucknall's British XXX Corps, with the 50th (Northumbrian) Infantry Division–commanded by Major General Douglas Graham–allotted as the assault division. The 50th was a highly experienced division that had already seen combat in France, North Africa, and Sicily. The men underwent extensive training in amphibious landings, including Exercise Fabius, a major training exercise at Hayling Island in May 1944. Demolition teams responsible for disabling underwater beach obstacles trained in swimming pools in the United Kingdom. Briefings were undertaken using detailed maps that used fictitious place names, and most of the men did not find out their destination until they were already on their way to Normandy. The amphibious landing was to be preceded by extensive air bombardment as well as naval bombardment by Bombarding Force K, a task force of eighteen ships, primarily cruisers and destroyers. Amphibious tanks of the 8th Armoured Brigade were to arrive at 07:20, followed by infantry at 07:25. The 231st Infantry Brigade was assigned to land at Jig, and the 69th Infantry Brigade at King. The 231st was to head west to capture Arromanches and establish contact with the American forces at Omaha, while the 69th was to move east and link up with the Canadian forces at Juno. The 47th Royal Marine Commando was assigned to land at Gold, infiltrate inland, and capture the small port at Port-en-Bessin from the landward side.

Arriving in the second wave on Jig, the 56th Infantry Brigade was to capture Bayeux and a nearby ridge, thus cutting the N13 highway between Caen and Bayeux to make it difficult for the Germans to move in reinforcements. The second wave on King, the 151st Infantry Brigade, was tasked with capturing the Caen road and railway, along with setting up positions on high ground between the Aure and Seulles rivers. Other forces involved in the landing included artillery regiments, signals corps, and engineering units.

=== German defenses ===
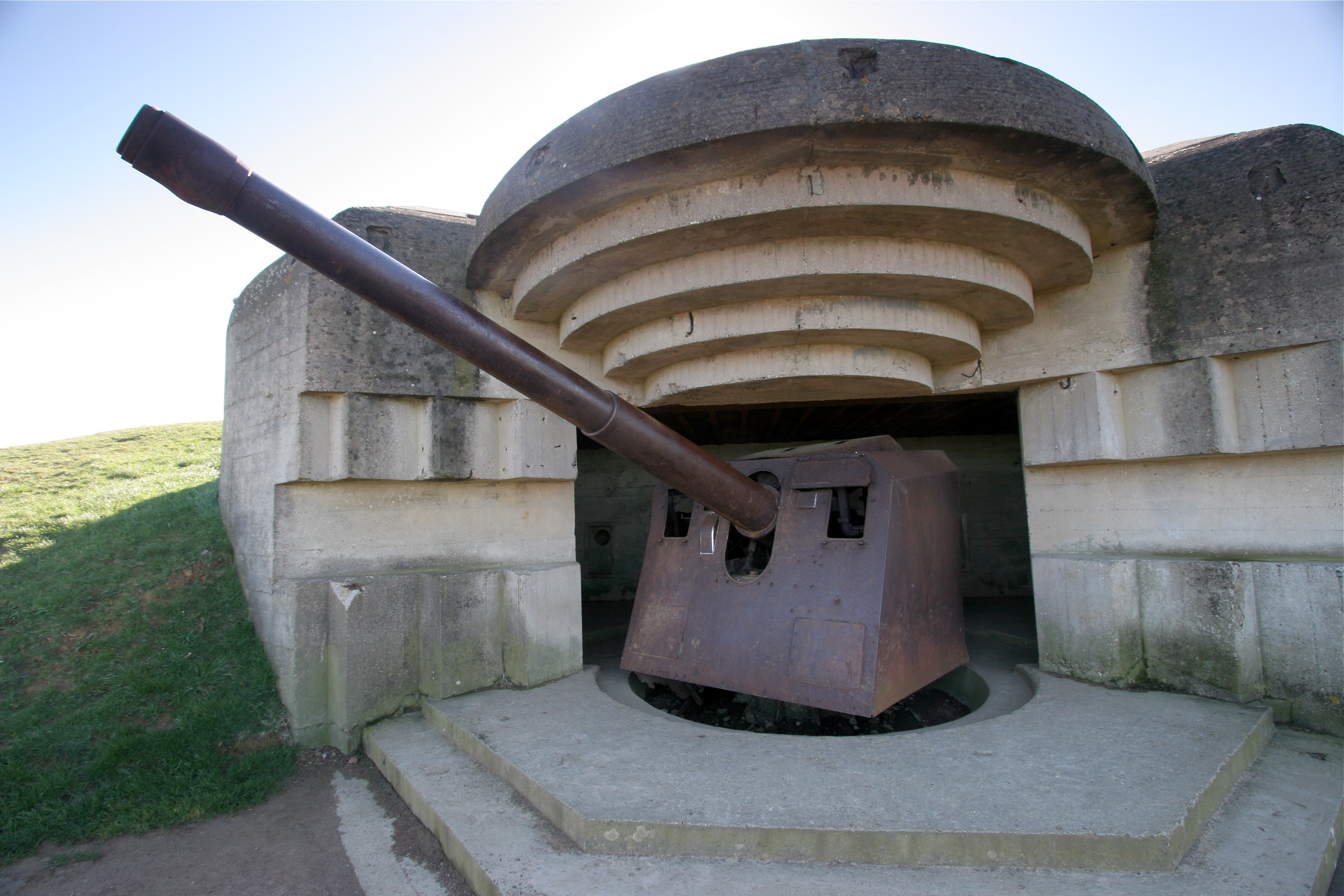
A gun emplacement at Longues-sur-Mer battery, photographed in 2008

In late 1943, Hitler placed Field Marshal Erwin Rommel in charge of improving the coastal defences along the Atlantic Wall in anticipation of an Allied invasion, expected to take place sometime in 1944. Rommel believed that the Normandy coast could be a possible landing point for the invasion, so he ordered the construction of extensive defensive works along that shore. In the immediate area of Gold, between Le Hamel and La Rivière, seven defensive strongpoints designed to hold 50 men apiece were constructed. Two major concrete-reinforced coastal artillery emplacements (a battery of four 122 mm guns at Mont Fleury and the Longues-sur-Mer battery, with four 150 mm guns) were only partially completed by D-Day. Rommel ordered wooden stakes, metal tripods, mines, and large anti-tank obstacles to be placed on the beach to delay the approach of landing craft and impede the movement of tanks. Expecting the Allies to land at high tide so that the infantry would spend less time exposed on the beach, he ordered many of these obstacles to be placed at the high tide mark. Tangles of barbed wire, booby traps, and the removal of ground cover made the approach hazardous for infantry.

Hitler gave Rommel command of the newly re-formed Army Group B, which included the 7th Army, the 15th Army, and the forces guarding the Netherlands. Reserves for this group included the 2nd, 21st, and 116th Panzer divisions. Recognizing that Allied air superiority would make it difficult if not impossible to move reserves into position once the invasion was underway, Rommel decided to concentrate the defences along the coast. The 716th Infantry Division, which had been stationed in the area since March 1942, was significantly understrength, with only 6,000 men. This unit received reinforcements, and some of the older men were replaced by younger soldiers. It was also supplemented by several battalions of Osttruppen (eastern soldiers), conscripted Soviet prisoners of war. The 352nd Infantry Division, a full-strength unit of around 12,000, was brought into the area by Rommel on 15 March and reinforced by two additional regiments. About 2,000 men, a mixture from the two infantry divisions, were stationed in the coastal area between Arromanches and Asnelles.

== Order of battle ==
=== British forces ===
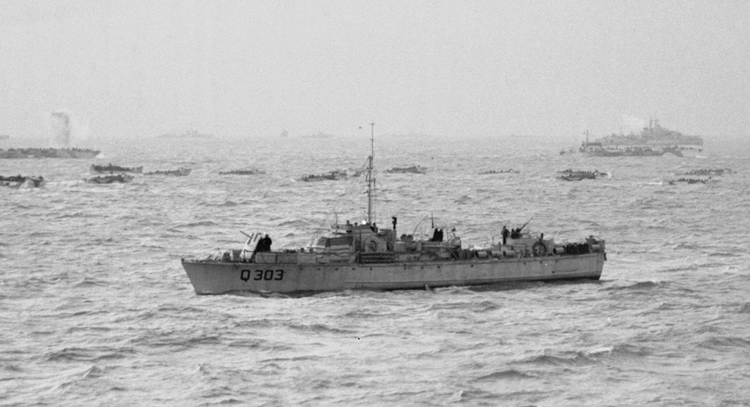
A Royal Navy Motor Launch (ML) assists landing craft to reach Gold on 6 June 1944.

50th (Northumbrian) Infantry Division, commanded by Major-General Douglas Graham

- 69th Infantry Brigade, commanded by Brigadier F.Y.C. Knox
  - 5th Battalion, East Yorkshire Regiment
  - 6th Battalion, Green Howards
  - 7th Battalion, Green Howards
- 151st Infantry Brigade, commanded by Brigadier R.H. Senior
  - 6th Battalion, Durham Light Infantry
  - 8th Battalion, Durham Light Infantry
  - 9th Battalion, Durham Light Infantry
- 231st Infantry Brigade, commanded by Brigadier A.G.B. Stanier
  - 1st Battalion, Dorsetshire Regiment
  - 1st Battalion, Hampshire Regiment
  - 2nd Battalion, Devonshire Regiment

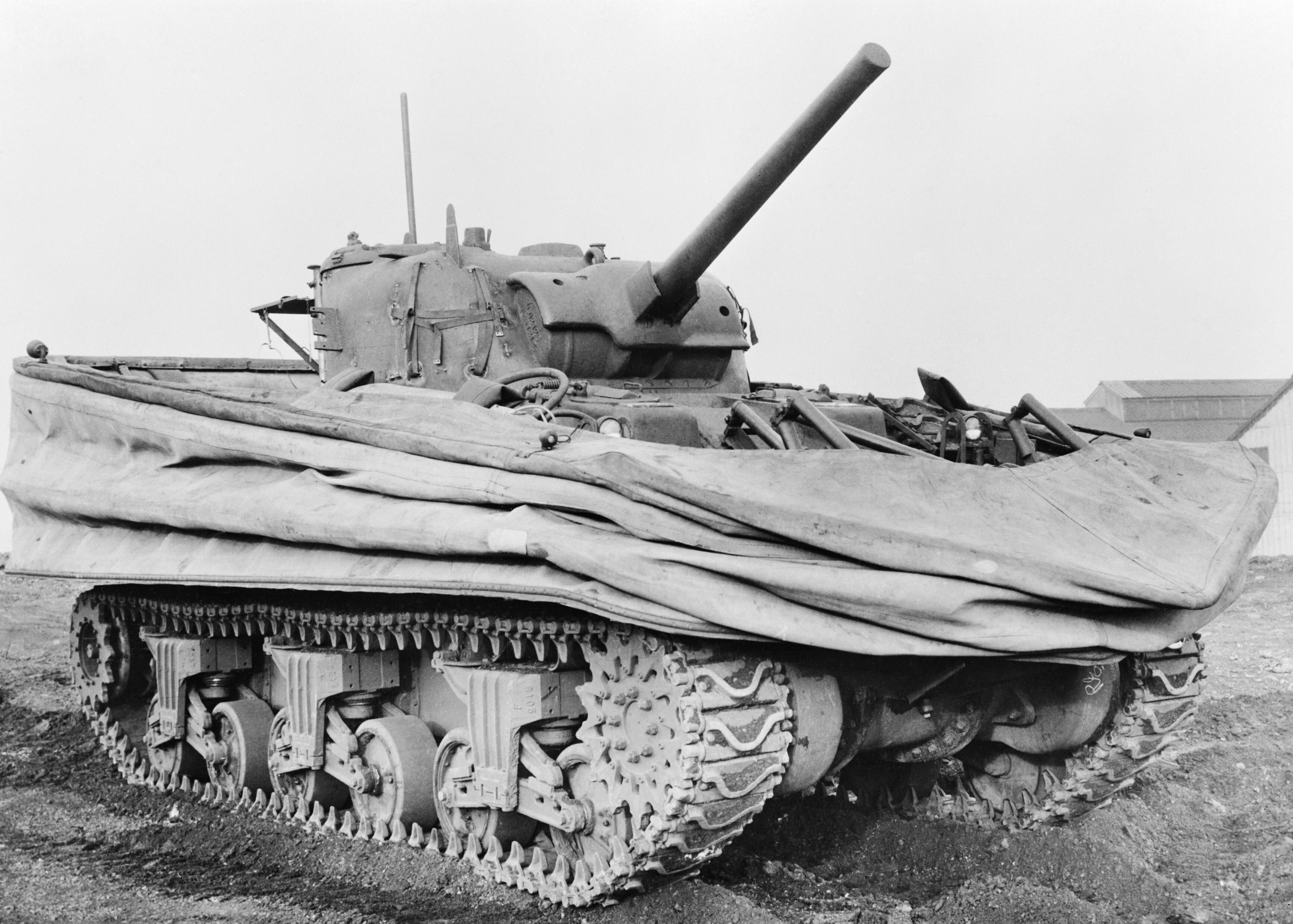
Specialist tanks known as Hobart's Funnies were used to support the landings at Gold. This example is an amphibious DD-modified M4 Sherman, showing its flotation screen.

- Divisional troops
  - 61st Reconnaissance Regiment, Royal Armoured Corps (RAC) (2 Squadrons)
  - 2nd Battalion, Cheshire Regiment (machine guns and heavy mortars)
  - 357th, 358th & 465th Batteries, 90th Field Regiment, Royal Artillery (RA) (Self-propelled)
  - 99th & 288th Batteries, 102nd (Northumberland Hussars) Anti-Tank Regiment, RA
  - 82nd Battery, 25th Light Anti-Aircraft Regiment, RA
  - 233rd (Northumbrian) Field Company, Royal Engineers (RE)
  - 295th Field Company, RE
  - 505th Field Company, RE
  - 235th (Northumbrian) Field Park Company, RE (bulldozers)
  - 50th Divisional Signals, Royal Corps of Signals
  - 149th, 186th & 200th Field Ambulances, Royal Army Medical Corps (RAMC)
  - 22nd Field Hygiene Section, RAMC
  - 50th Divisional Provost Company, Royal Military Police (RMP)

Formations attached for assault phase

- Elements of 79th Armoured Division
  - Westminster Dragoons (Flail tanks)
  - 141st Royal Tank Regiment (The Buffs) (Churchill Crocodiles) (2 Troops)
  - 81st & 82nd Assault Squadrons, 6th Assault Regiment, RE (AVREs)
- 56th Infantry Brigade, commanded by Brigadier E.C. Pepper
  - 2nd Battalion, Essex Regiment
  - 2nd Battalion, Gloucestershire Regiment
  - 2nd Battalion, South Wales Borderers
- 8th Armoured Brigade, commanded by Brigadier H.J.B. Carcroft
  - 4th/7th Royal Dragoon Guards (DD Tanks)
  - Nottinghamshire Yeomanry (DD Tanks)
- 76th Anti-Aircraft Brigade, commanded by Brigadier E.R. Benson
  - 113th Heavy Anti-Aircraft Regiment, RA (HQ only)
  - 320th Battery, 93rd Light Anti-Aircraft Regiment, RA
  - 394th & 395th Batteries, 120th Light Anti-Aircraft Regiment, RA
  - 152nd Anti-Aircraft Operations Room, RA
  - A Troop, 356th (Independent) Searchlight Battery, RA

Additional units attached for assault phase

  - GHQ Liaison Regiment, RAC ('Phantom')
  - 341st, 342nd, & 462nd Batteries, 86th (East Anglian) (Hertfordshire Yeomanry) Field Regiment, RA (self-propelled)
  - 413th, 431st & 511th Batteries, 147th (Essex Yeomanry) Field Regiment, RA (self-propelled)
  - 198th & 234th Batteries, 73rd Anti-Tank Regiment, RA
  - 662nd Air Observation Post Squadron, RA (ground crew of one flight only)
  - 73rd Field Company, RE
  - 280th Field Company, RE
  - 203rd Field Ambulance, RAMC
  - 168th Light Field Ambulance, RAMC
  - 1st Royal Marine Armoured Support Regiment
  - No. 47 (Royal Marine) Commando

104 Beach Sub-Area HQ

- 8 GHQ Troops RE (sub units distributed between the Beach Groups)
- 1043 Port Operating Group RE (other sub units distributed between the Beach Groups)
  - 953rd Inland Water Transport Company
- 4 RAF Beach Squadron (sub units distributed between the Beach Groups)
- 980 RAF Beach Balloon Squadron (sub units distributed between the Beach Groups)
- No. 9 Beach Group (King beach)
  - Beach signal section B10
  - Beach Commandos 'J', 'G', and 'T'
  - 2nd Battalion, Hertfordshire Regiment
  - 69th, 89th & 183rd Field Companies, RE
  - 74th Mechanical Equipment Section, RE
  - 1043rd Port Operating Company, RE
  - 961st Inland Water Transport Company, RE
  - 21st Stores Sections, RE
  - 305th General Transport Company, Royal Army Service Corps (RASC)
  - 2nd Detail Issue Depot, RASC
  - 247th Petrol Company, RASC
  - 3rd & 10th Casualty Clearing Stations, RAMC
  - 3rd, 32nd & 35th Field Dressing Stations, RAMC
  - Nos 24 & 30 Field Transfusion Unit, RAMC
  - 7th & 36th Ordnance Beach Detachments, Royal Army Ordnance Corps (RAOC)
  - 24th Beach Recovery Section, Royal Electrical & Mechanical Engineers (REME)
  - 243rd Provost Company, RMP
  - 75th, 208th & 209th (Pioneer) Companies, Pioneer Corps
  - 107th Beach Flight RAF
  - 54th Beach Balloon Flight RAF
- No. 10 Beach Group (Jig beach)
  - Beach signal section B7
  - Beach Commando 'Q'
  - 6th Battalion, Border Regiment
  - 90th Field Company, RE
  - 23rd Stores Section, RE
  - 51st Mechanical Equipment Section, RE
  - 23rd Port Operating Company, RE
  - 536th & 705th General Transport Companies, RASC
  - 5th Detail Issue Depot, RASC
  - 244th Petrol Company, RASC
  - 25th & 31st Field Dressing Stations, RAMC
  - Nos 24 & 30 Field Transfusion Unit, RAMC
  - 23rd & 1035th Port Operating Companies, RAMC
  - 12th Ordnance Beach Detachment, RAOC
  - 25th Beach Recovery Section, REME
  - 243rd Provost Company, RMP
  - 75th, 112th, 120th, 173rd & 243rd (Pioneer) Companies, Pioneer Corps
  - 108th beach Flight RAF
  - 55th Beach Balloon Flight RAF
- 36 Beach Brick (in reserve)
  - 18th Battalion Durham Light Infantry
  - 503rd Field Company RE
  - HQ 100th HAA Regiment RA
  - 305th HAA Battery RA
  - 328th LAA Battery RA
  - Detachments from RE, REME, RAMC, RMP, RAMC and RAF
- Nos 41, 42, 47 & 48 Field Surgical Units, RAMC
- 22nd & 23rd Port Details, RAMC
- XXX Corps Workshop, REME (2 Composite Workshops & 1 Light Recovery Section)

=== German forces ===
From June 1942, 716th Infantry Division covered the Grandcamps Sector, which stretched from the base of the Cotentin Peninsula to the Orne River near Caen, a distance of 77 kilometres (48 mi). When 352nd Infantry Division arrived on 15 March, the Grandcamps Sector was split into the Bayeux Sector (from Carentan to Asnelles) and the Caen Sector (from Asnelles to the Orne). Most of the 716th Infantry Division remained where they were, and thus the defenses in Caen Sector (site of the Gold landings) were not substantially strengthened.

- 352nd Infantry Division under Generalleutnant Dietrich Kraiss
  - 915th Grenadier Regiment: south-east of Bayeux, as reserves
  - 916th Grenadier Regiment: covered Omaha and the westernmost part of Gold
  - 352nd Artillery Regiment: covered Omaha and the westernmost part of Gold
- 716th Static Infantry Division under Generalleutnant Wilhelm Richter
  - 726th Infantry Regiment: two battalions in and around Le Hamel. Members of the 441st Ost Battalion garrisoned the coastal defenses. One battalion was stationed near Crépon as reserves.
  - 736th Infantry Regiment: covered Juno, Sword, and the easternmost part of Gold
  - 1716th Artillery Regiment: mobile and casemated batteries east and west of Crépon

== Landings ==
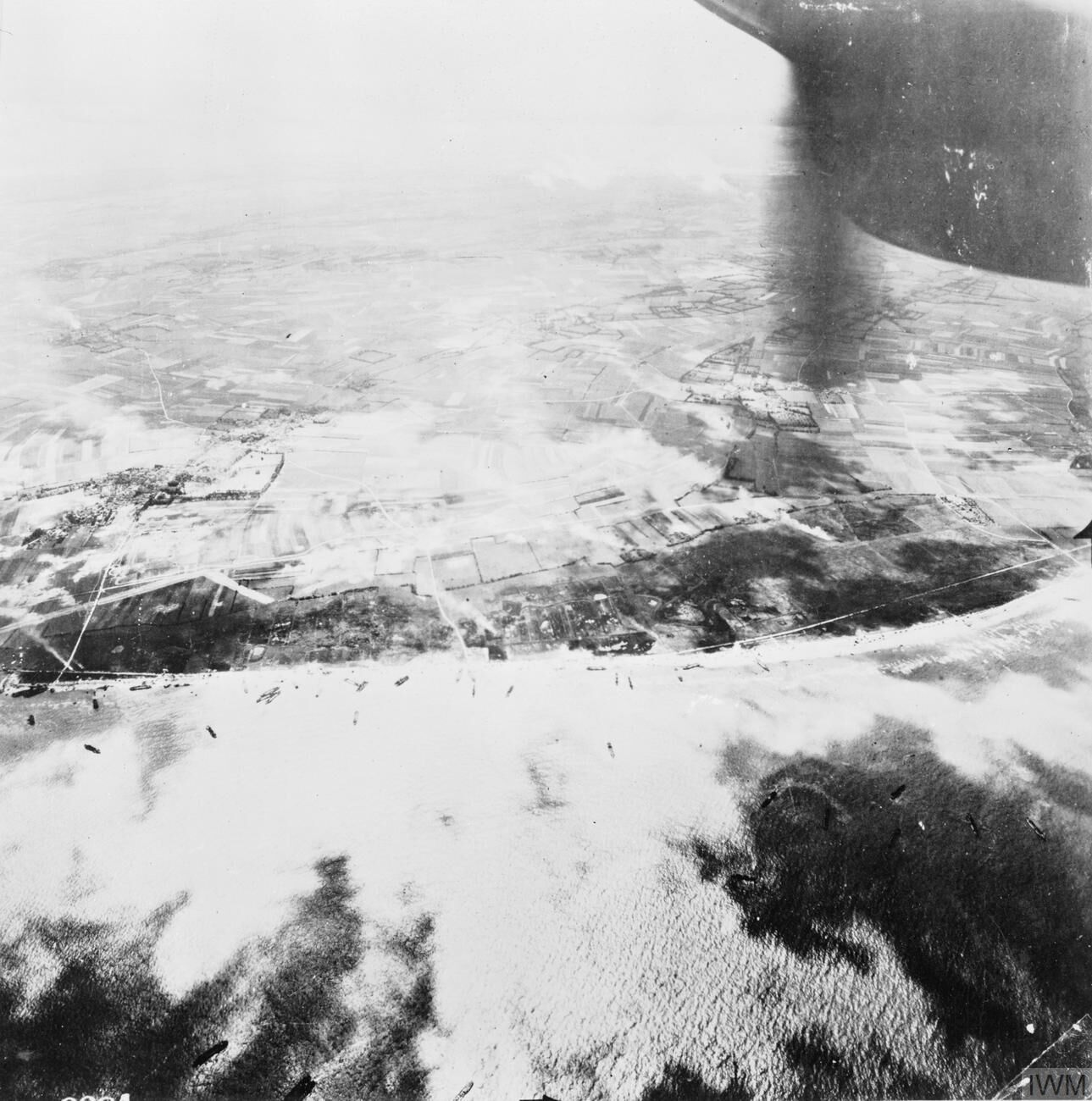
King Red (left), King Green and Jig Red (right) beaches from the air during the 50th Division landings

Bombing of Normandy began around midnight with over 2,200 British and American bombers attacking targets along the coast and further inland. At Gold, naval bombardment by Bombarding Force K got underway at 05:30, at which time the first waves of infantry were loading into their Landing Craft Assault (LCAs) for the run in to the beach. German defensive positions were attacked by medium and heavy bombers and by self-propelled guns on board the landing craft. Results were good at Mont Fleury Battery and at Longues, where at 07:00 Ajax and Argonaut took out of commission three of the four guns. The fourth gun resumed firing sporadically in the afternoon, and the garrison surrendered the following day. Two heavily casemated gun emplacements (an 88 mm gun at La Rivière overlooking King and a 75 mm gun at Le Hamel overlooking Jig) were only lightly damaged, as they were heavily reinforced with concrete, especially on the seaward side. These positions had embrasures that permitted a wide range of enfilade fire on the beach. Four other German strong points in the immediate area were also only lightly damaged, and had to be individually assaulted as the day progressed.

=== King Sector ===
H-Hour for the landing at Gold was set at 07:25 on King sector (50 minutes later than in the American landings, because of differences in the tide). The first wave on King was the 5th East Yorkshires and 6th Green Howards of 69th Brigade, assisted by amphibious DD tanks of the 4th/7th Dragoon Guards. The 7th Green Howards landed at 08:20. The original plan called for the 38 DD tanks to be launched from their landing craft tank (LCTs) about 5,000 yards (4,600 m) out. Due to extremely choppy seas, they decided to run the tanks directly onto the beach. Infantry, engineers, and DD tanks arrived almost simultaneously. Units disembarking onto the beach immediately came under fire from the casemated 88 mm gun at La Rivière, and the infantry were forced to take cover behind the sea wall. The gun was taken out when a flail tank of the Westminster Dragoons fired a charge directly into its aperture. The 5th East Yorkshires, supported by several tanks, spent the rest of the morning clearing out the heavily fortified houses of La Rivière, at the loss of 90 men, including six officers.

Commandos of 47 (RM) Commando coming ashore from LCAs (Landing Craft Assault)

Specialised armour arriving in the first wave included AVREs, mine flails, and armoured bulldozers. Clearing paths off the beach proved difficult, as the tanks got stuck in the mud or were taken out by mines. A lone mine flail tank finally cleared a path from the beach up toward the Mont Fleury Battery and Ver-Sur-Mer. This route was used by the Green Howards and tanks of the 4th/7th Dragoon Guards, who cleared the remaining resistance at the Mont Fleury Battery. B Company moved on to attack trench positions and machine gun emplacements at Meuvaines Ridge, while C Company moved to the west of Ver-Sur-Mer to help cover the assault on Crépon, where roads led to the important targets of Bayeux and Caen. The 7th Green Howards attacked the gun battery at Ver-Sur-Mer, where they took 50 prisoners. Colour Sergeant-Major Stanley Hollis earned the only Victoria Cross to be bestowed for actions on D-Day. On the way to the Mont Fleury Battery, Hollis came under machine gun fire while investigating a pillbox, so he shot into the entrance with his Sten gun and dropped a grenade through the roof, killing most of the occupants. He cleared a nearby trench of enemy soldiers, whereupon the occupants of a second pillbox surrendered. Later in the day, he saved the lives of three men during an attempt to take out a field artillery installation at a farm near Crépon.

Scheduled to land at 11:00 on Jig, the 56th Infantry Brigade was re-routed to King, because the gun battery at Le Hamel was still operational. They proceeded towards their objective of Bayeux. 151st Brigade arrived at the same time and after meeting fierce resistance, they achieved their objective of controlling the road and railway between Bayeux and Caen. 56th Brigade made slow progress and had to dig in for the night some distance from Bayeux. 69th Brigade secured the eastern flank and by nightfall made contact with the Canadian forces on Juno.

=== Jig Sector ===
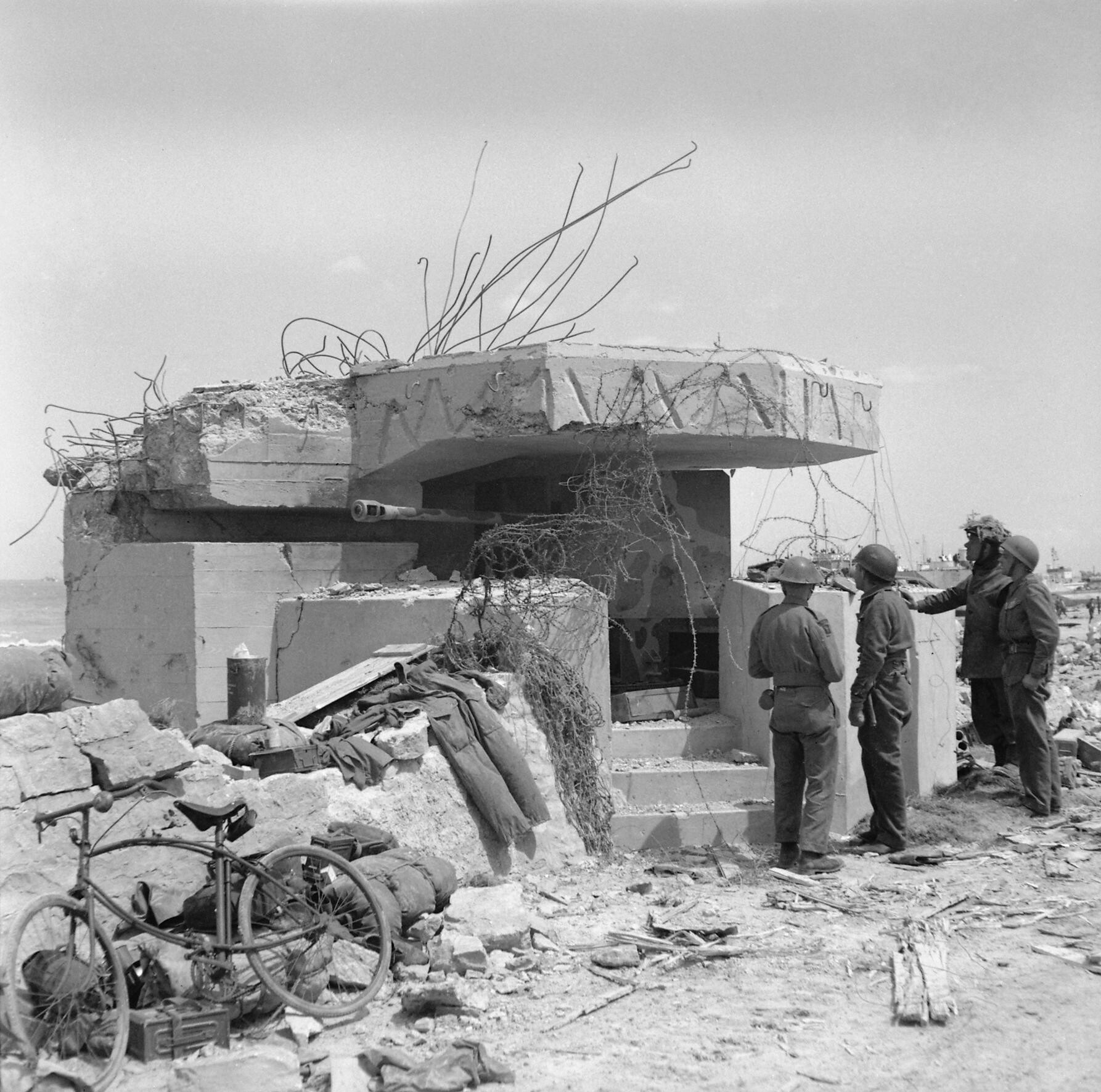
German strongpoint WN-35 at Le Pont Chaussé, on the boundary between Jig and King. Heavily damaged by offshore bombardment, it was captured by the 6th Howards with support from three AVRE tanks of 81st Assault Squadron.

At Jig, the first wave of infantry (the 1st Dorsetshires and 1st Hampshires of the 231st Infantry Brigade) arrived at 07:25, and immediately came under fire from the casemated 75 mm gun at Le Hamel. Due to navigation errors and the strong current, both groups came ashore well to the east of their intended landing points. The DD tank and Royal Marine Centaur tanks that were supposed to arrive in advance of the landing were delayed by rough seas and did not arrive until 08:00. Many of the tanks got bogged down on the beach or were taken out by enemy fire. The tide came in quicker than expected, before many of the beach obstacles and mines were cleared, and some of the landing craft were damaged as a result. Two companies of the 1st Hampshires landed very close to the strong point at Le Hamel, and had to fight inland through enemy garrisons to get off the beach. Attempts to flank Le Hamel were made difficult by the surrounding machine gun placements, mines, and barbed wire. Elements of the 1st Hampshires captured the German strongpoint WN-36 at the eastern edge of the village of Asnelles. When they turned west to move along the beach towards their primary objective at Le Hamel, they came under heavy fire and had to break off the attack. Major Warren, in charge after the commanding officer Lieutenant Colonel Nelson Smith was wounded, decided that the troops would have to circle around and attack the emplacement from the rear, a process that took several hours. The troops began to have some success around 15:00 with the arrival of an AVRE tank of 82nd Assault Squadron. The tank fired two petards into the sanatorium, where most of the defenders were located. The German soldiers fled into fortified houses in Le Hamel and Asnelles, and were taken out in house-to-house combat. Few surrendered. The 75 mm gun was finally silenced at 16:00, when the AVRE tank fired a large petard charge into the rear entrance of the casemate. C/A Company, 1st Hampshires and the AVRE tank proceeded west along the beach and took out strongpoint WN-38 at La Fontaine St Côme, taking 20 prisoners. Still further west, D Company captured strong point WN-39 at the Arromanches radar station, capturing 30 more defenders.

The 2nd Devons arrived at 08:15, while the beach was still under heavy fire. One company stayed to help with the assault on Le Hamel, while the rest moved to capture the village of Ryes astride the road to Bayeux. Ryes was captured at around 16:30. The 1st Dorsets attacked a German position on the beach at La Cabane des Douanes and headed inland to arc westward toward the high ground south of Arromanches. They cleared enemy positions at Le Bulot and Puits d'Hérode, and arrived at their destination late in the morning. Joined by elements of the 1st Hampshires and covered by indirect fire from the naval forces offshore, they took Arromanches late in the afternoon.

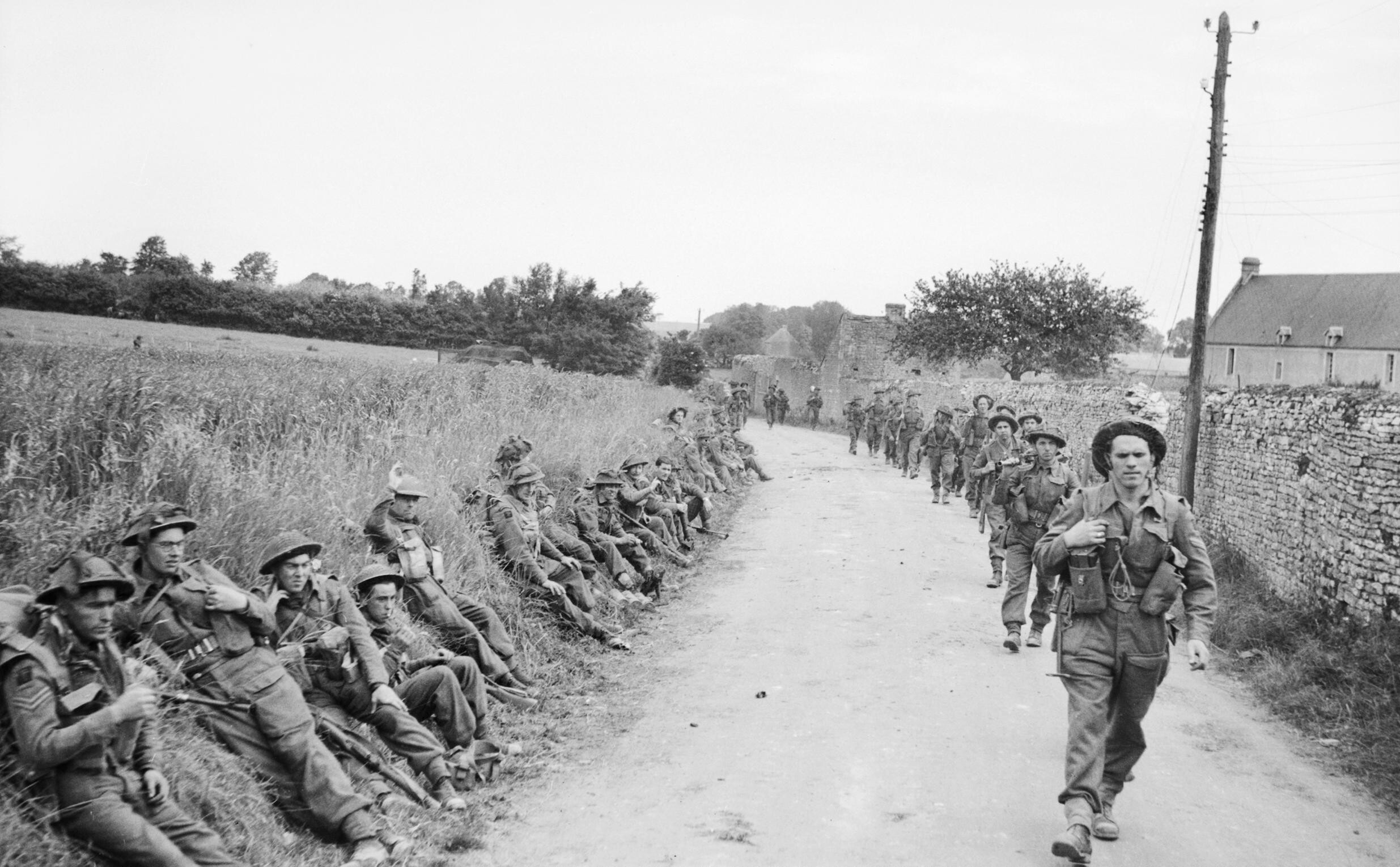
Infantry of the 50th Division near St Gabriel on 6 June

=== 47 Commando ===
The 47 Royal Marine Commando was assigned to capture the small harbour at Port-en-Bessin, on the boundary with Omaha, about 7 miles (11 km) west of Arromanches and 8 miles (13 km) from their landing point at Jig. The commanding officer, Lieutenant-Colonel C. F. Phillips, opted to attack from the south, as the site was well protected on the seaward side. The force of 420 men consisted of five troops of 63 men, a mortar and machine gun troop, a transport group with four tracked vehicles, and a headquarters group. The plan was to land at Gold at 09:25, assemble at La Rosière, and move cross-country to a ridge (designated as Point 72) south of Port-en-Bessin, arriving at around 13:00. Here they would call for indirect fire from the supporting vessels at sea and then move in to capture the town.

In rough seas and under enemy fire, the commandos began disembarking at Jig, some distance east of their intended position, at 09:50. Five of their LCAs were sunk by beach obstacles or enemy fire, at the cost of 76 casualties. Major P. M. Donnell temporarily took charge until Phillips and some others who had got separated from the unit rejoined the group at 14:00 along the Meuvaines–Le Carrefour road. The commandos took additional casualties in several skirmishes, including at La Rosière, on the way to Point 72. They did not arrive there until 22:30, too late to launch an attack, so they dug in for the night. The town and port were captured in the battle of Port-en-Bessin on 7–8 June 1944.

=== German response ===
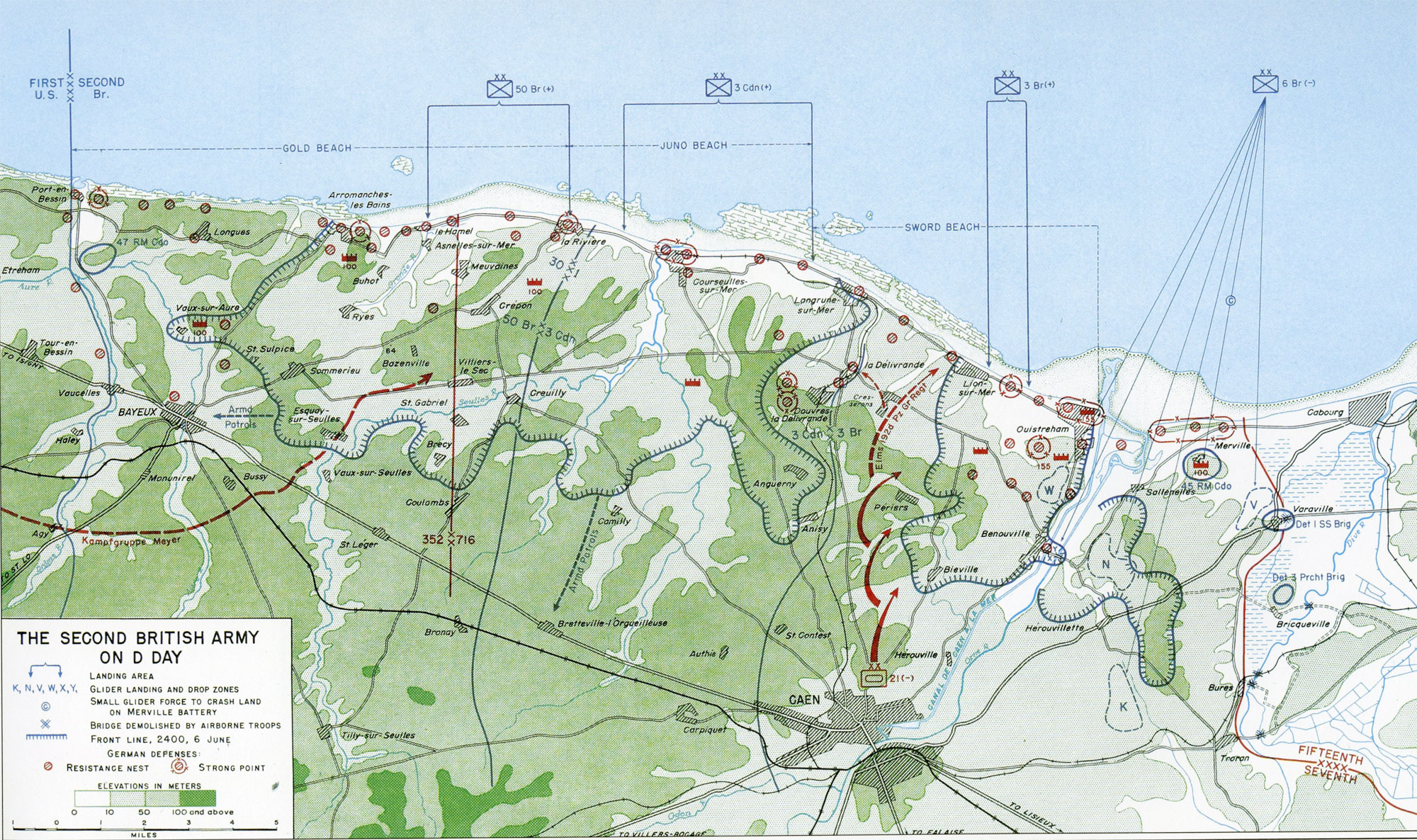
Map shows the British and Canadian beaches, and the positions at the close of D-Day.

As the Luftwaffe meteorological centre in Paris had predicted two weeks of stormy weather, some Wehrmacht commanders were away from the front attending war games in Rennes, and many soldiers had been given leave. On D-Day, Rommel was in Germany for his wife's birthday and a meeting with Hitler to try to get more Panzers. The 352nd and 716th Divisions were placed on high alert after the Allied airborne landings, which had taken place just after midnight behind Utah and Sword. The 2,700-strong Kampfgruppe Meyer, near Bayeux as the divisional reserve, was sent to investigate the parachute drops behind Utah. Marcks recalled them when dawn broke and the scope of the invasion became apparent. One battalion was ordered to reinforce the German efforts at Omaha. The remainder were ordered to rendezvous with reinforcements at Villiers le Sec, 7.5 miles (12.1 km) east of Bayeux, to launch a counter-attack. Fired upon by Allied air forces, the column finally arrived in the late afternoon, at which time they were met by elements of the 69th Brigade. The British lost four tanks in the ensuing engagement but the Kampfgruppe was almost completely wiped out. Marcks was killed, and his detailed maps of German coastal emplacements fell into British hands.

Because Allied air superiority meant it would be difficult for the Germans to move up their reserves, Rommel believed that their best chance was to stop the invasion at the shore. The scope of the invasion meant that once these coastal defences were defeated and the troops scattered, it was difficult to defend territory inland or launch counter-attacks. At 22:33, Kraiss ordered the 352nd Division to create a defensive line north of Bayeux but this proved impossible, as most of the territory involved was already in British hands and all the defending units had taken serious losses. The Luftwaffe played only a minor role on D-Day. At Gold, several small groups of bombers that arrived at sunset caused Allied casualties at Le Hamel and damaged a road near Ver-sur-Mer. At 06:00 on 7 June, the operations room of HMS Bulolo, offshore near Gold, was damaged by a bomber attack, but the ship was able to remain on station. The unit responsible was likely II./Kampfgeschwader 40 (KG 40 – Bomber Wing 40). Under the command of Fliegerführer Atlantik (Flyer Command Atlantic), it was based at Bordeaux–Merignac. On the evening of the 6/7 June 1944, 26 Heinkel He 177 heavy bombers equipped with Henschel Hs 293 anti-ship guided missiles attacked shipping over Normandy, included the Gold area. II./KG 40 lost 13 aircraft to all causes during the attack.

The 1st SS Panzer Division Leibstandarte SS Adolf Hitler were released before midnight from the OKW reserve and ordered to counter-attack between Bayeux and the Orne, supplemented by 12th SS Panzer Division Hitlerjugend and Panzer Lehr Division; the armoured divisions began arriving on 8 June.

== Aftermath ==
=== Analysis ===
Pockets of German resistance remained throughout the beachhead area and the British were stopped about 3.7 miles (6.0 km) short of their D-Day objectives. Bayeux, a primary D-Day objective for 50th Division, was captured on 7 June. By the end of D-Day, the 50th Division had lost around 700 men. Total casualties, from all units involved in operations at Gold, were in the region of 1,000–1,100 casualties, of which 350 were killed. German losses are unknown; at least 1,000 were captured.

=== Gold after 6 June ===
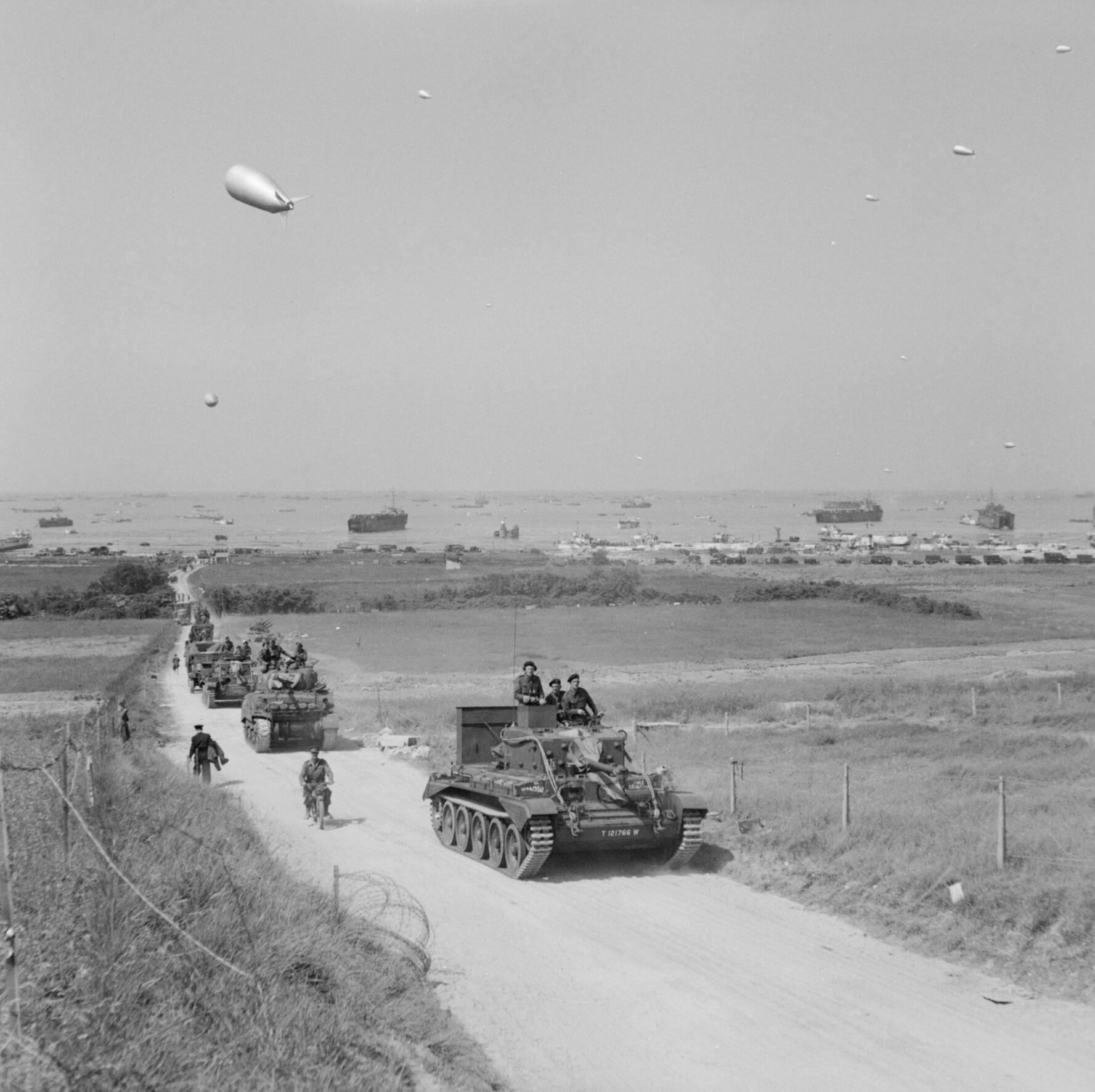
Cromwell and Sherman tanks of the British 7th Armoured Division, moving inland on 7 June. The barrage balloons are intended to deter low-flying enemy planes.

By the end of D-Day, 24,970 men had been landed at Gold, along with 2,100 vehicles and 1,000 long tons (1,000 t) of supplies. The follow-up landings were slowed by the loss of 34 LCTs and the bad weather. The 24th Lancers and 61st Reconnaissance Regiment, due to land on D-Day to help spearhead the drive towards Villers-Bocage, were unable to put ashore until 7 June. In 2004, Trew wrote that the delay

effectively ruled out any chance of a thrust south ... [and] ... represented a major blow to Second Army's intentions and Montgomery's plan.

The 7th Armoured Division and the 49th (West Riding) Infantry Division were the follow-up divisions of XXX Corps. The 22nd Armoured Brigade (the armoured component of the 7th Armoured Division) was scheduled to land during the evening of 6 June, but it was unable to land until the next day. The bulk of the division landed from 9 to 10 June, with some elements landing later. The 49th Division came ashore on 12 June.

The first components of the Mulberry harbours were brought across the Channel on D+1 and the structures were in use for unloading by mid-June. One was constructed at Arromanches by British forces, the other at Omaha by American forces. A severe storm on 19 June destroyed the Omaha harbour. The Arromanches harbour was repaired and remained in use for the next ten months, with a maximum capacity of 7,000 long tons (7,100 t) of stores per day. Of the British supplies landed in Normandy by the end of August, 35% arrived via the Mulberry harbour and 15% came in via the small harbours at Port-en-Bessin and Courseulles-sur-Mer. Most shipments were brought in over the beaches until the port of Cherbourg was cleared of mines and obstructions on 16 July. The most important use of the Mulberry harbour was the unloading of heavy machinery that could not be brought across the beaches. Artificial breakwaters (Gooseberries) sheltered hundreds of ships during the storm of 17–23 June, and provided shelter for craft unloading stores at Juno and Sword. A joint Anglo-American oil depot was constructed at Port-en-Bessin, fed via buoyed pipes known as "Tombola" from oil tankers moored offshore. Using this method, 175,000 long tons (178,000 t) of petrol (half for the Second Army) was delivered by the end of August, by which time the underwater pipelines constructed in Operation Pluto were ready.

=== Subsequent operations ===
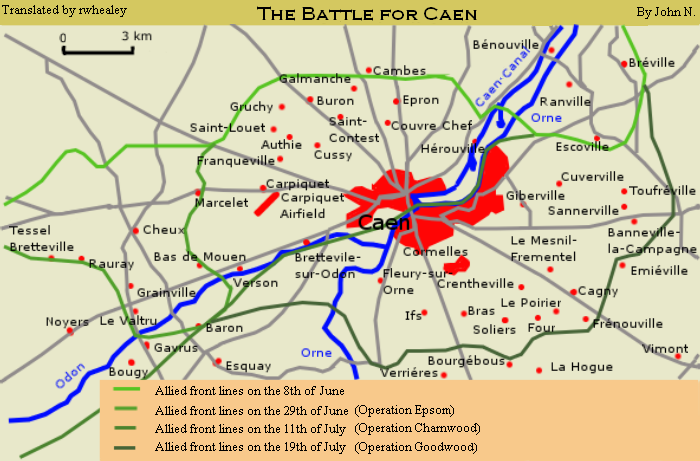
Operations in the Battle for Caen

Fighting in the Caen area versus the 21st Panzer, the 12th SS Panzer Division Hitlerjugend, and other units soon reached a stalemate. Operation Perch (7–14 June) failed to take Caen, and the British were forced to withdraw to Tilly-sur-Seulles. After a delay because of storms during 17–23 June, Operation Epsom was launched on 26 June, an attempt by VIII Corps to swing around and attack Caen from the south-west and establish a bridgehead south of the Odon. Although the operation failed to take Caen, the Germans suffered heavy tank losses and had committed every available Panzer unit to the operation. Caen was severely bombed on the night of 7 July and then occupied north of the River Orne in Operation Charnwood on 8–9 July. Two offensives during 18–21 July, Operation Atlantic and Operation Goodwood, captured the rest of Caen and the high ground to the south, but by then the city was nearly destroyed.

== Tourism ==
The site of the Normandy landings is a popular tourist destination. The battery at Longues-sur-Mer is well preserved, and its observation bunker houses a visitor centre. The gun emplacements at Le Hamel and La Rivière still exist, but many other batteries and defensive positions have been allowed to decay. Bayeux is home to the Musée Mémorial de la Bataille de Normandie and the Bayeux Commonwealth War Graves Commission Cemetery. La Cambe German war cemetery is also near Bayeux. At Arromanches, many elements of the Mulberry Harbour are extant and a museum examines its construction and use. The radar station is the site of a visitor centre and theatre.

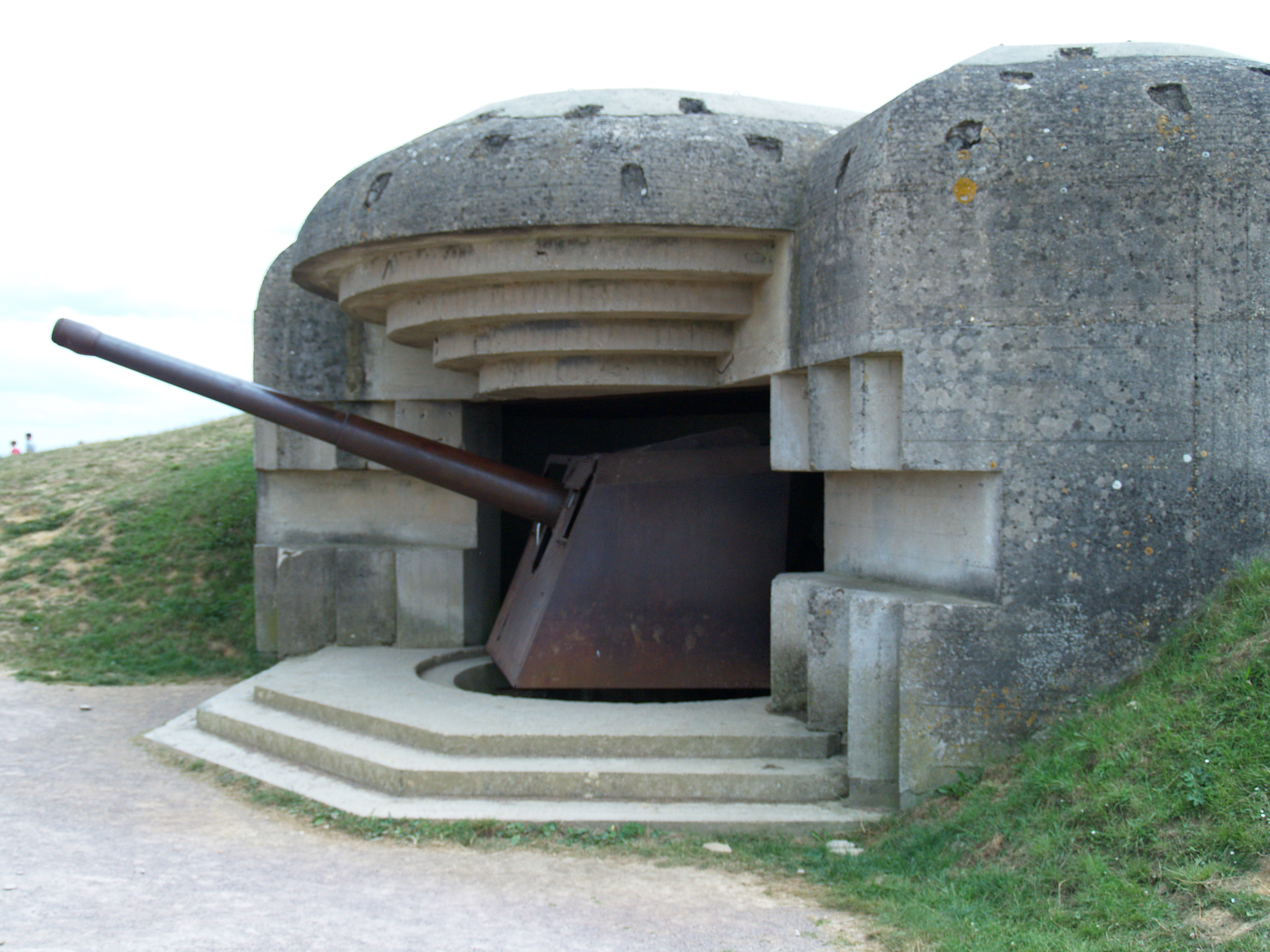
Artillery emplacement at Longues-sur-Mer battery, 2010

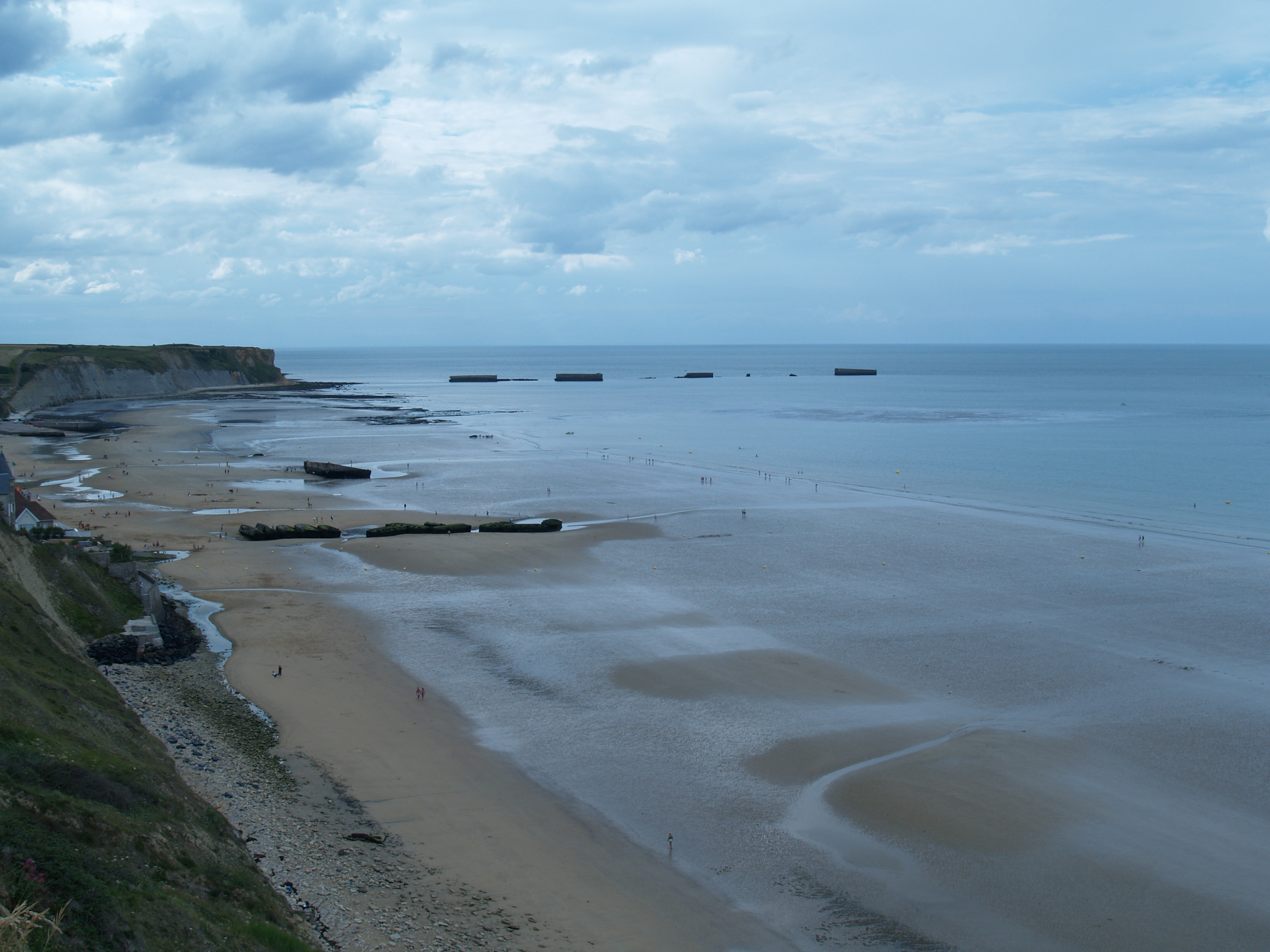
Elements of the Mulberry harbour are still present at Arromanches.
