= 364th Infantry Division =

- 364. Infanterie-Division
- Active: late 1943 – 21 January 1944
- Country: Nazi Germany
- Branch: Army (Wehrmacht)
- Type: Infantry
- Size: Division (officially), Regiment (de facto)

The 364th Infantry Division (German: 364. Infanterie-Division) was a short-lived infantry division of the Heer, the ground forces of Nazi Germany, during World War II. It never reached full strength before its deployment was aborted on 21 January 1944 in favor of the creation of other divisions.

== History ==
The 364th Infantry Division had been intended as one of the divisions of the 21st wave of deployment and was earmarked to use much of the remaining personnel of the 355th Infantry Division. It was intended to assemble the Grenadier Regiments 971, 972, and 973, each with two battalions for a total of six battalions in the division, as well as the Division Fusilier Battalion 364, the Artillery Regiment 364 with four detachments, and various division support units. Only the two battalions of Grenadier Regiment 973 as well as the Division Fusilier Battalion 364 saw partial deployment; these three battalions were subsequently combined to form Grenadier Regiment 1050. The Grenadier Regiment 1050 was subsequently placed under the 77th Infantry Division; Regiment 1050 was annihilated on 15 August 1944 in Saint-Malo when faced with Western Allied forces that came ashore during Operation Overlord.

The 364th Infantry Division's deployment proved abortive and its assembly overturned on 21 January 1944; the military mail numbers that had been assigned to the division in January 1944 were already deleted by February.

The divisional commander throughout the few weeks of the division's existence was Walter Poppe.
