= 364th =

364th may refer to:

- 364th Bombardment Squadron, inactive United States Air Force unit
- 364th Fighter Group or 131st Bomb Wing, unit of the Missouri Air National Guard, stationed at Whiteman Air Force Base, Knob Noster, Missouri
- 364th Fighter Squadron, established at Hamilton Field, California in December 1942, part of the 357th Fighter Group

== See also ==
- 364 (number)
- 364, the year 364 (CCCLXIV) of the Julian calendar
- 364 BC
