= French Forces of the West =

French Army Detachment in WW II

- Forces françaises de l'Ouest
- Active: 14 October 1944 – 15 June 1945
- Country: France
- Type: Army Group
- Role: Infantry
- Engagements: World War II

Commanders
- Notable commanders: General Edgard de Larminat

The French Forces of the West (French: Forces françaises de l'Ouest (FFO)), was a French Army Group created on 14 October 1944 by the Provisional Government of the French Republic to regroup French military forces in Western France, with the aim to contain or reduce the remaining pockets of German resistance on the French Atlantic coast.

In March 1945, the FFO were renamed Atlantic Army Detachment (French: Détachement d'Armée de l'Atlantique (DDA)).
Its commander was General Edgard de Larminat.

== Prelude ==
After the Allied success in the Battle of Normandy and Operation Dragoon, the German Army had withdrawn all its troops from Southern and Western France, except for the Atlantic pockets. Some 200,000 soldiers occupied so called Atlantikfestungen (lit. "Atlantic strongholds") to deny the use of port facilities to the Allies, to secure the continued use by German submarines in the Battle of the Atlantic and to draw as many Allied troops much as possible away from the advance towards Germany.

Six of these Pockets were captured by the Allies between June 1944 and October 1944, but at a very high cost and for a disappointing result, as the Germans, before surrendering, demolished the ports to the extent that it took months to restore them to service.

It was therefore decided that the remaining five Pockets in Western France would not be stormed, but only besieged and contained. This task was given to the French Provisional Government.

== French Forces of the West (October 1944 - March 1945) ==
The French Forces of the West was mostly composed of former French Resistance forces already present in the area.
The area of operation was divided in 3 sectors :

- North, around the Lorient pocket : 12,000 men under command of général Borgnis-Desbordes.
- Center, around the Saint-Nazaire pocket : 16,500 men under command of colonel Raymond Chomel.
- South, pockets of La Rochelle, Royan and Pointe de Grave, 12,000 men under command of colonel Henri Adeline.

These French troops were supported by one US Division : the 94th Infantry Division, which was replaced by the 66th Infantry Division on 1 January 1945. There was also a small naval unit under command of Vice-Admiral Joseph Rue and an airforce unit under command of General Édouard Corniglion-Molinier.

The French Forces of the West suffered from lack of weapons, ammunition, fuel and clothing, as all priority went to the advance into Germany and stopping the German counteroffensive in the Ardennes. Morale during the sieges plummeted, as these soldiers were mostly volunteers who had experience in guerilla warfare in which mobility was of the essence. They had no experience and little appetite for a siege during the winter months. They were also plagued by a scurvy epidemic.

== Atlantic Army Detachment (March - May 1945) ==
By the end of the winter, the logistical situation of the FFO was much improved. Reinforcements were also sent : the 10th Infantry Division in February and the 2nd Armored Division in March. and the FFO troops were converted into 3 Army Infantry divisions :

- North, around the Lorient pocket : 19th Infantry Division under command of général Borgnis-Desbordes.
- Center, around the Saint-Nazaire pocket : 25th Infantry Division under command of colonel Raymond Chomel.
- South, pockets of La Rochelle, Royan and Pointe de Grave : 23rd Infantry Division (Division Gironde) under command of André Marie d'Anselme.
- Division Gironde : 10,000 men under command of colonel Henri-Marie-Charles Adeline.

Charles Degaulle decided that the Royan pocket should be taken, as a demonstration to his allies of France's regained military status. Royan was taken on 17 April 1945 by the French directly under command of General Edgard de Larminat, with the help of the USAAF, but at a very high cost. The city was completely destroyed, and 1,500 civilians were killed.

After Royan was taken, Pointe de Grave was taken on 20 April and Ile d'Oléron on 30 April. The planned attack on La Rochelle was stopped by the German surrender at Lüneburg Heath on 4 May.

The FFO was disbanded on 15 June 1945.
