= German World War II fortresses =

Strategic areas for Germany in WWII

German fortresses during World War II (German: Festungen or Fester Platz, lit. 'fixed place'; called pockets by the Allies) were bridgeheads, cities, islands and towns designated by Adolf Hitler as areas that were to be fortified and stocked with food and ammunition in order to hold out against Allied offensives.

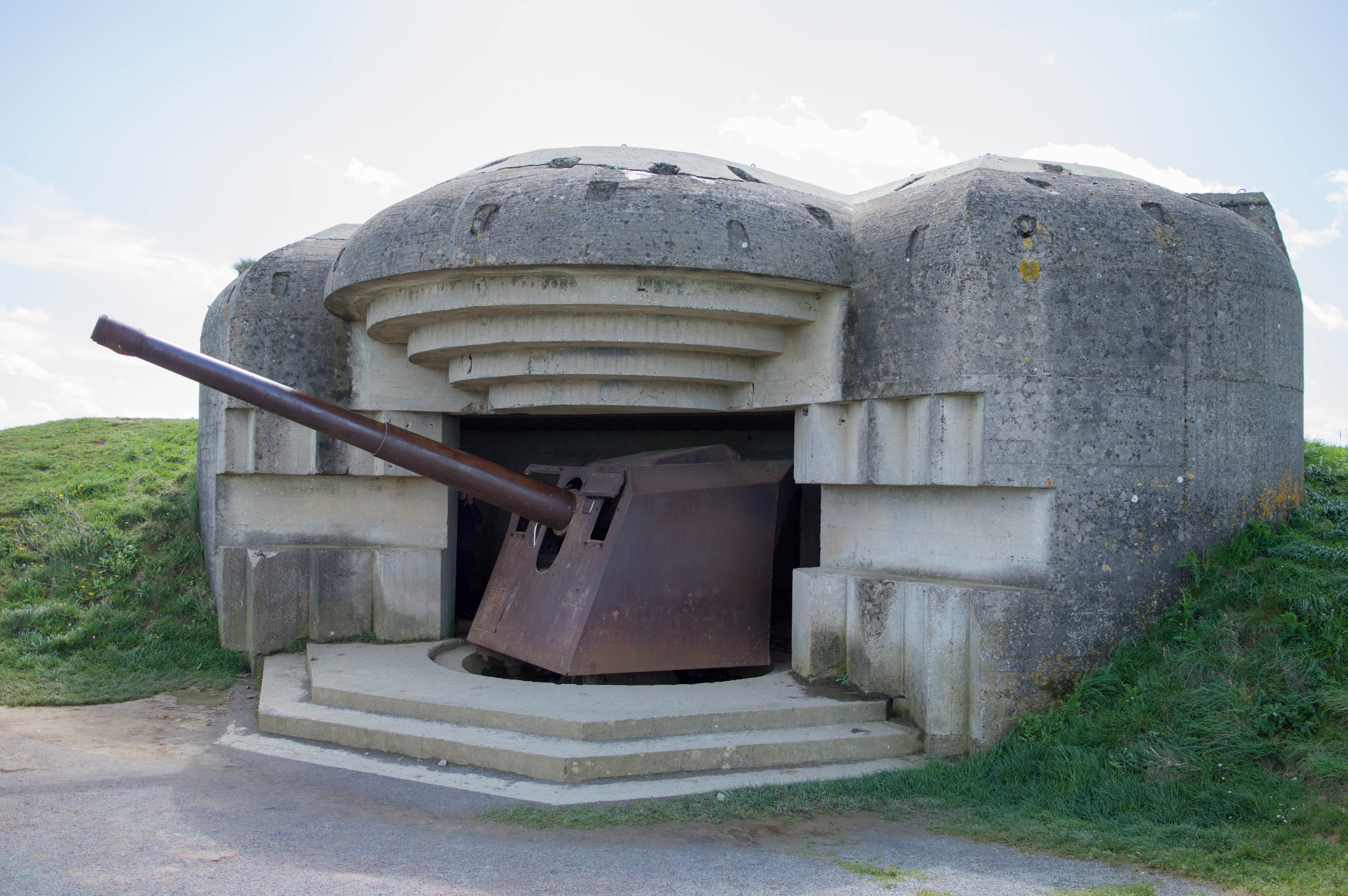
An Atlantic Wall bunker

The fortress doctrine evolved towards the end of World War II, when the German leadership had not yet accepted defeat, but had begun to realize that drastic measures were required to forestall inevitable Allied offensives. The first such stronghold was Stalingrad.

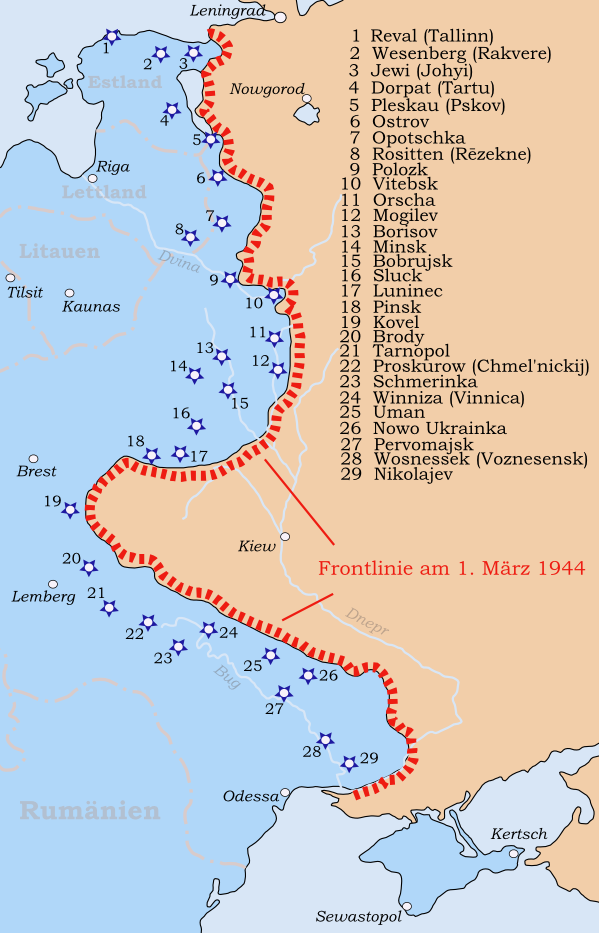
Map of Feste Plätze on the Eastern Front in 1944

On the Eastern Front, Warsaw, Budapest, Vilnius, Kolberg, Königsberg, Küstrin, Danzig and Breslau were some of the large cities selected as strongholds.

On the Western Front, Hitler declared eleven major ports as fortresses on 19 January 1944: IJmuiden, the Hook of Holland, Dunkirk, Boulogne-sur-Mer, Le Havre, Cherbourg, Saint-Malo, Brest, Lorient, Saint-Nazaire and the Gironde estuary. In February and March 1944 three more coastal areas were declared to be fortresses: the Channel Islands, Calais and La Rochelle.

== Fate of the fortresses ==
The fate of the fortress areas varied. Stalingrad, the first to fall, is seen as a crucial turning point in the war, and one of the key battles which led to German defeat. In several cases, Alderney, for example, the fortresses were bypassed by the attackers and did not fall, surrendering only after the unconditional surrender of Germany.

One fortress, Courland, would see guerrilla war being waged in the area after 1945 to the late 1950s by Latvian and Lithuanian partisans, with a few Germans who fought as Forest Brothers, with individual guerrillas remaining in hiding and evading capture into the 1980s.

Fortresses	Siege	Commander	Besiegers	Date declared	Date siege started	Date surrendered	Length of siege	Notes
Belle Île, Groix and Lorient, French State, Military Administration in France	Lorient pocket	Wilhelm Fahrmbacher (surrendered)	United States Armed Forces: 66th Infantry Division	19 January 1944	12 August 1944	10 May 1945	8 months and 4 weeks	
Berlin, Province of Brandenburg, Free State of Prussia, Gau Berlin, Greater German Reich	Battle in Berlin	Bruno Ritter von Hauenschild → Hellmuth Reymann → Ernst Kaether → Adolf Hitler → Helmuth Weidling (surrendered)	Soviet Armed Forces: Workers' and Peasants' Red Army; 1st Belorussian Front; 1st Ukrainian Front; Armed Forces of the Republic of Poland: First Polish Army	c. 1 February 1945	23 April 1945 (encirclement of Berlin complete on 27 April 1945)	2 May 1945	1 week and 2 days	Called the Berlin Defense Area.
Bobruysk, Army Group Rear Area Command	Bobruysk offensive	Adolf Hamann (POW)	(Soviet Union) Soviet Armed Forces: Workers' and Peasants' Red Army; 1st Belorussian Front; 65th Army		27 June 1944	29 June 1944	2 days	Now called Babruysk.
Boulogne-sur-Mer, French State, Military Administration in France	Operation Wellhit	Ferdinand Heim (surrendered)	British Armed Forces: Royal Air Force; No. 2 Group; Canadian Armed Forces: First Canadian Army; 3rd Canadian Division; 8th Canadian Infantry Brigade; 9th Canadian Infantry Brigade		17 September 1944	22 September 1944	5 days	
Breslau, Province of Lower Silesia, Free State of Prussia, Gau Lower Silesia, Greater German Reich	Siege of Breslau	Battle Commander Karl Hanke	Soviet Armed Forces: Military Air Forces of the Union of Soviet Socialist Republics; 2nd Air Army; 18th Air Army; Workers' and Peasants' Red Army; 1st Ukrainian Front; 6th Army	25 July 1944	13 February 1945	6 May 1945	2 months, 3 weeks and 2 days	Now called Wrocław.
Brest, French State, Military Administration in France	Battle for Brest	Hermann-Bernhard Ramcke (surrendered)	British Armed Forces United States Armed Forces: United States Army Air Forces; US Third Army; VIII Army Corps; 2nd Infantry Division; 8th Infantry Division; 29th Infantry Division; 35th Engineer Combat Battalion; 2nd Ranger Battalion; 35th Engineer Combat Battalion; 644th Tank Destroyer Battalion; 5th Ranger Battalion; 23rd Headquarters Special Troops; 79th Armoured Division (elements); 6th Armored Division (elements)		7 August 1944	19 September 1944	1 month, 1 week and 5 days	
Budapest, Government of National Unity, Kingdom of Hungary	Siege of Budapest	Karl Pfeffer-Wildenbruch (POW)	Romanian Armed Forces: First Army; 7th Army Corps; Soviet Armed Forces: Workers' and Peasants' Red Army; 2nd Ukrainian Front; 53rd Army; 7th Guards Army; 3rd Ukrainian Front (elements); 46th Army	1 December 1944	24 December 1944	13 February 1945	1 month, 2 weeks and 6 days	
Calais, French State, Military Administration in France	Operation Undergo	Ludwig Schroeder (surrendered)	British Armed Forces: Royal Air Force; Royal Navy; Canadian Armed Forces: First Canadian Army; 3rd Canadian Division; 7th Canadian Infantry Brigade; 8th Canadian Infantry Brigade		25 September 1944	30 September 1944	5 days	
Channel Islands	Battle of the Atlantic	Rudolf Graf von Schmettow → Friedrich Hüffmeier (surrendered)	Allied Expeditionary Force: United States Navy; United States Army; Royal Navy		2 September 1944	Guernsey 9 May; Jersey 9 May; Sark 10 May; Alderney 16 May 1945	8 months and 1 week	Surrendered after the surrender of the Greater German Reich.
Cherbourg, French State, Military Administration in France	Battle of Cherbourg	Karl-Wilhelm von Schlieben (surrendered)	United States Armed Forces: First Army; VII Army Corps; 9th Infantry Division; 79th Infantry Division; Ninth Army; III Corps; 4th Infantry Division		22 June 1944	27 June 1944	5 days	
Courland Pocket, General District Latvia, Reichskommissariat Ostland, Army Group Rear Area Command	Courland Pocket	Ferdinand Schörner → Lothar Rendulic → Walter Weiß → Lothar Rendulic → Heinrich von Vietinghoff → Lothar Rendulic → Carl Hilpert (surrendered)			31 July 1944	10 May 1945	9 months, 1 week and 3 days	Surrendered after the surrender of the Greater German Reich. See Army Group North and Army Group Courland.
Crete, Hellenic State, Military Administration in Greece	Battle of the Atlantic and the Cretan resistance	Hans-Georg Benthack (surrendered)	British Armed Forces: Royal Navy; Hellenic Army		4 October 1944	12 May 1945	7 months, 1 week and 1 day	Surrendered after the surrender of the Greater German Reich. See Fortress Crete.
Crimea, Army Group Rear Area Command	Crimean offensive and Kerch–Eltigen operation	Erwin Jaenecke → Ferdinand Schörner → Erwin Jaenecke → Karl Allmendinger			1 November 1943	12 May 1944	6 months, 1 week and 4 days	
Danzig, Danzig Region, Reichsgau Danzig-West Prussia, Greater German Reich	Siege of Danzig	Dietrich von Saucken	2nd Belorussian Front Polish rebels		15 March 1945	30 March 1945	2 weeks and 1 day	Now called Gdańsk.
Dieppe, French State, Military Administration in France	N/A		N/A		N/A	1 September 1944	N/A	Evacuated and liberated without opposition. Also see Operation Fusilade and Operation Jubilee.
Dunkirk, French State, Military Administration in France	Siege of Dunkirk	Wolfgang von Kluge → Friedrich Frisius (surrendered)	British Armed Forces: British Army; 51st Division; 154th Infantry Brigade; 21st Army Group; 1st Czechoslovak Independent Armoured Brigade; Royal Navy; 4th Special Service Brigade; Canadian Armed Forces: Canadian Army; 2nd Canadian Infantry Division		15 September 1944	9 May 1945	7 months, 3 weeks and 3 days	Surrendered after the surrender of the Greater German Reich.
Gironde Estuary North, Military Administration in France	Operation Jupiter and Operation Venerable	Hartwig Pohlmann → Hans Michahelles (surrendered)	French Liberation Army: 10th French Division; French 2nd Armored Division; French 23rd Infantry Division; 50th Regiment; 158th Regiment; United States Armed Forces: 66th Infantry Division		12 September 1944	30 April 1945	7 months, 2 weeks and 4 days	
Gironde Estuary South, Military Administration in France	Royan pocket	Christian Sonntag → Otto Prahl (surrendered)			12 September 1944	20 April 1945	7 months, 1 week and 1 day	
Hook of Holland, Reich Commissariat for the Occupied Dutch Territories	N/A	Oberst Flinzer (surrendered)	N/A	19 January 1944	N/A	5 May 1945	N/A	
Ijmuiden, Reich Commissariat for the Occupied Dutch Territories	N/A	Colonel Stahmer → Hans Huttner (surrendered)	N/A	19 January 1944	N/A	5 May 1945	N/A	
Île de Ré and La Rochelle, French State, Military Administration in France	Siege of La Rochelle	Ernst Schirlitz (surrendered)			17 September 1944	7 May 1945	7 months, 3 weeks and 4 days	
Kolberg, Region of Köslin, Province of Pomerania, Gau Pomerania, Greater German Reich	Battle of Kolberg	Fritz Fullriede	Soviet Armed Forces: Workers' and Peasants' Red Army; 1st Belorussian Front; 272nd Rifle Division; 45th Tank Brigade; Armed Forces of the Republic of Poland: First Polish Army; Polish 4th Infantry Division; Polish 3rd Infantry Division; Polish 6th Infantry Division	November 1944	4 March 1945	14 March 1945	1 week and 3 days	Now called Kołobrzeg.
Königsberg, Region of Königsberg, East Prussia, Free State of Prussia, Gau East Prussia, Greater German Reich	Battle of Königsberg	Otto Lasch (POW)	Workers' and Peasants' Red Army: 1st Baltic Front; 3rd Belorussian Front		Late January 1945	9 April 1945	2 months and 4 weeks	Now called Kaliningrad.
Küstrin, Königsberg Nm., province of Brandenburg, Free State of Prussia, Gau March of Brandenburg, Greater German Reich	Siege of Küstrin	Adolf Raegener → Heinrich-Friedrich Reinefarth	Soviet Armed Forces: Workers' and Peasants' Red Army; 1st Belorussian Front; 82nd Guards Rifle Division	25 January 1945	February 1945	30 March 1945	1 month, 2 weeks and 4 days	Now called Kostrzyn nad Odrą. A small number (<1,000) of the German garrison reached German lines after a breakout during the night of March 29/30 1945
Le Havre, French State, Military Administration in France	Operation Astonia	Eberhard Wildermuth (surrendered)	British Armed Forces: British Army; I Corps; 49th Infantry Division; 51st Infantry Division; 79th Armoured Division; Canadian Armed Forces: Canadian Army; 1st Armoured Carrier Regiment		10 September 1944	12 September 1944	2 days	
Posen, Posen Region, Reichsgau Wartheland, Greater German Reich	Battle of Posen	Ernst Mattern → Ernst Gonell †	(Soviet Union) Soviet Armed Forces: Workers' and Peasants' Red Army; 1st Belorussian Front; 1st Guards Tank Army; 8th Guards Army; Armed Forces of the Republic of Poland		24 January 1945	23 February 1945	4 weeks and 2 days	Now called Poznań.
Saint-Malo, French State, Military Administration in France	Battle of Saint-Malo	Andreas von Aulock (surrendered)	United States Armed Forces: Third United States Army; French Liberation Army; British Army	19 January 1944	4 August 1944	17 August 1944	1 week and 6 days	
Saint-Nazaire, French State, Military Administration in France	Saint-Nazaire pocket	Maximilian Hünten → Hans Junck → Captain Mathies (surrendered)	United States Armed Forces: 4th Armored Division; 6th Armored Division; 94th Infantry Division; 66th Infantry Division; French Liberation Army: French Forces of the Interior; Snipers and Partisans; 25th Infantry Division		27 August 1944	11 May 1945	8 months and 2 weeks	Surrendered after the surrender of the Greater German Reich.
Stalingrad, Army Group Rear Area Command	Battle of Stalingrad	Friedrich Paulus (POW) → Karl Strecker (surrendered)	(Soviet Union) Soviet Armed Forces: Workers' and Peasants' Red Army; Stalingrad Front; 28th Army; 51st Army; 57th Army; 62nd Army; 64th Army; Don Front; 24th Army; 65th Army; 66th Army; Southwestern Front; 1st Guards Army; 5th Tank Army; 21st Army		10 September 1942 (encirclement of Stalingrad complete on 22 November 1942 during Operation Uranus)	early March 1943	6 months and 2 days	Now called Volgograd. By 1 November 1942, 90% of Stalingrad was occupied by Axis forces. On 26 January 1943, during Operation Koltso, Axis forces in Stalingrad were cut into two pockets, with Karl Strecker in command of the northern pocket and Friedrich Paulus in command of the southern pocket.
French protectorate of Tunisia	Tunisian campaign	Erwin Rommel → Gustav Fehn → Erwin Rommel → Hans-Jürgen von Arnim (surrendered)	British Army: British Indian Army; Newfoundland; United States Armed Forces; Free French Forces; New Zealand Defence Force; Hellenic Armed Forces		9 November 1942	13 May 1943	6 months and 4 days	
Warsaw, Warsaw District, General Government, Greater German Reich	Lublin–Brest offensive, Vistula–Oder offensive and Warsaw Uprising	Hellmuth Eisenstuck → Ernst Mock	N/A	27 July 1944	1 August 1944	17 January 1945	5 months, 2 weeks and 2 days	On 16 January 1945, German troops withdrew from Warsaw and the next day the First Polish Army, 2nd Guards Tank Army and 3rd Shock Army entered the city. Also see Festung Warschau

== See also ==
- Alpine Fortress
- Atlantic pockets
- Atlantic Wall
- Czechoslovak border fortifications
- Festung Norwegen
- Fortress Europe
- Maginot line
- Molotov line
- Stalin line
- Valtellina Redoubt
