= 1st Battalion of Somali Tirailleurs =

Battalion in the French Army (1916-1958)

- "1er Bataillon de Tirailleurs Somalis"
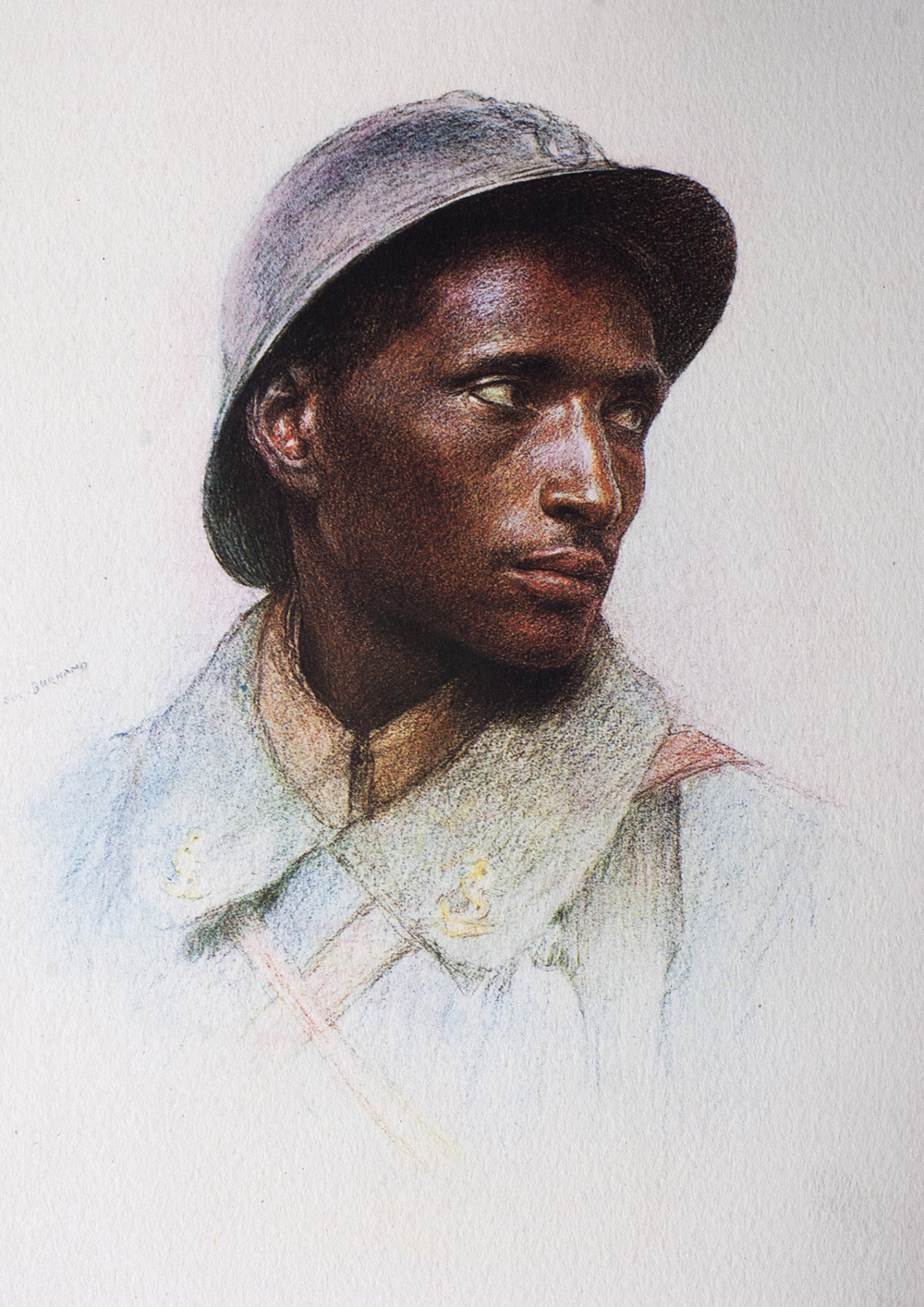
- Ahmed Abokob, a Somali skirmisher from Djibouti, a part of the 1st Battalion of Somali Tirailleurs c. 1917
- Active: 1916–1958
- Country: France
- Branch: French Army
- Type: Troupes coloniales
- Role: Infantry
- Garrison/HQ: Madagascar (1919–1932, 1947–1958)
- Colors: Red and Blue
- Engagements: First World War: Battle of Verdun; Nivelle offensive: Second Battle of the Aisne; Battle of the Hills; Battle of La Malmaison; German spring offensive: Third Battle of the Aisne; Second Battle of the Marne; Second World War: Royan pocket; Malagasy Uprising
- Decorations: Croix de guerre 1914-1918; Croix de guerre 1939-1945

The 1st Battalion of Somali Tirailleurs, formed in 1916 from recruits from the French Somali Coast, was a unit belonging to the French Army.

It distinguished itself during the First World War, notably during the recapture of Fort Douaumont in October 1916 with the Moroccan colonial infantry regiment (RICM). Recreated during the Second World War, it participated particularly in the fighting at Pointe de Grave in April 1945. Disbanded in 1946, its traditions were preserved by the Somali company until 1958.

== Combat History ==
=== First World War ===
On February 22, 1915, a company of Somali riflemen was established and disbanded the following year.

The 6th Somali Marching Battalion was formed at Majunga in Madagascar on May 11, 1916, with recruits from the French Somali Coast. It was assembled in Fréjus in France on June 10, 1916, and was renamed the 1st Somali Tirailleurs Battalion that same day.

The battalion originally served as a staging battalion, but the officers met the demands of the Somalis to serve as fighters and not as workers.

In October 1916 the battalion was attached to the RICM. It entered the war by participating in the assault on Fort Douaumont on October 24, 1916. After this feat of arms which had a significant impact, the flag of the RICM was decorated with the cross of the Legion of Honor and the 2nd and 4th companies of the Somali battalion also received the Croix de Guerre with palms.

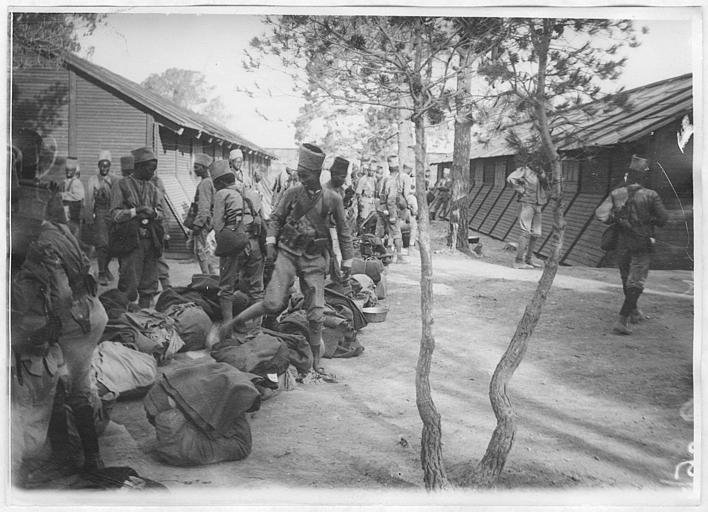
The Somali Tirailleurs receive their supplies at the Fréjus camp, mid-1916.

In December 1916, the battalion, reorganized as a combat unit, was reinforced with the addition of a machine gun company and a platoon of 37 mm cannons. The battalion were in Fréjus and Saint-Raphaël for "wintering" (hivernage).

An article from The New York Times discussing Somali troops being awarded for bravery during the Battle of Verdun and Second Battle of the Aisne, 1917

In May 1917, the battalion participated in the Battle of Chemin des Dames, for which it was cited in the order of the division. On October 23, 1917, it won the victory of Malmaison within the RICM and obtained the first army citation for the entire battalion.

In May and June 1918, the battalion took part in the Third Battle of the Aisne and in July in the Second Battle of the Marne. In August and September 1918, the Somali battalion fought on the Oise front, and in October 1918 it obtained its second citation to the order of the army as well as the right to wear the fourragère in the colors of the Croix De Guerre.

Of the 2,434 riflemen recruited on the Somali Coast, 2,088 were deployed to fight in Europe. Their losses are estimated at 517 killed and 1,200 wounded.

=== Interwar Period ===
On January 1, 1919, following the end of the war, the battalion consisted of:

- Somalis: 526
- Comorians: 209 (a separate company)
- Yemenis: 70
- Abyssinians: 30
- Total: 835

The strength of the battalion, dissolved on January 23, 1919, was quickly reduced to two companies, sent to Madagascar. The force was then reduced to a single company of Somali riflemen, integrated into the 1st Malagasy mixed regiment. It was dissolved in 1932.

=== Second World War ===
In December 1942, the French Somali Coast joined Free France and once again provided a battalion of Somali riflemen to participate in the fighting for the Liberation of France. On 1 January 1943, it split into two on 16 May 1944 and the sovereignty battalion set up a Somali marching battalion.

On 26 August 1944, the Somali marching battalion was entrusted in Djibouti with the guarding of the tricolor pennant of the 1st Battalion Somali tirailleurs of World War I. The first Somali elements joined French North Africa in March and the Somali marching battalion was regrouped in Sousse in September.

The Somali marching battalion arrived in France in February 1945 and was regrouped on the 26th with the marching battalions of No. 14 and No. 15 to form the French Equatorial Africa and Somali regiments.

The regiment was integrated into the Atlantic Army Detachment (DAA) commanded by General de Larminat and responsible for reducing the Royan pocket. It was involved in the liberation of Royan and Pointe de Grave, before liberating Soulac in April 1945. During these battles the losses of the Somali battalion amounted to 41 killed (5 Europeans and 36 riflemen) and 106 wounded (10 Europeans and 96 riflemen) or 147 men out of a strength of 860. As a reward for their successes in April 1945, the regiment and its three battalions each received a citation in the divisional orders on 14/7/1945. On 20/8/1945, the Somali battalion received a citation in the army's orders.

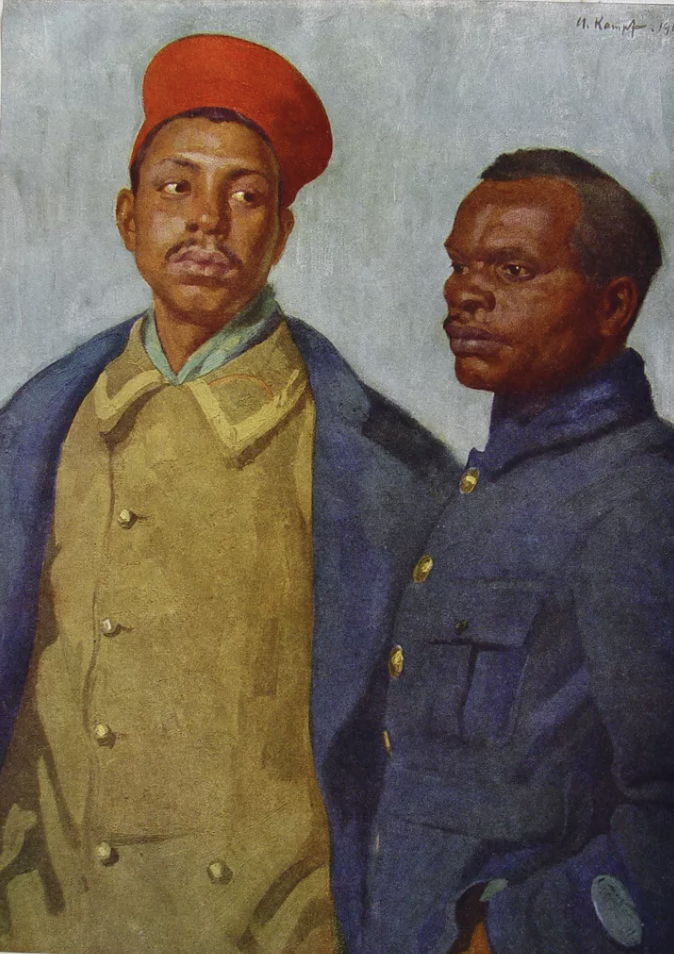
Somali and Malagasy tirailleurs drawn by Arthur Kampf in 1918

=== From 1945 to the present day ===
The Somali Marching Battalion was disbanded on June 25, 1946. On August 1, 1946, the Somali Battalion became the Somali Company (known as the “Somali Traditions Company”), integrated into the Senegalese tirailleurs battalion of the French Somali Coast.

In 1947, the Somali company joined the island of Madagascar, which was subject to an anti-colonial revolt. From July 1948 to October 1949, it was integrated into the Senegalese reinforcement rifle battalion. On December 1, 1958, the company was renamed the 1st Autonomous Marine Infantry Company (1st CAIMA) then, on November 1, 1960, it became the 3rd Company of the 12th Marine Infantry Battalion (ex-Malagasy Tirailleurs Battalion)1, dissolved in 1962.

In 1970, the 5th Overseas Combined Arms Regiment (RIAOM) inherited the traditional heritage of the Somali battalion, in addition to that of the colonial infantry. On its flag, five battle inscriptions, two decorations and, since 1996, the red belt of the Somali troops today recall the memory of the Somali riflemen who distinguished themselves in the French Army.

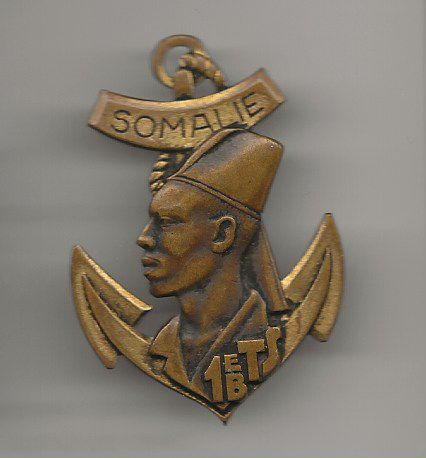
Insignia of the Somali Company

== Emblem ==
The unit's badge, made for the Somali company, was approved by order number G.1080 issued on 12/2/1954. Somali's head represents the unit's soldiers, the 1st BTS inscription on his collar recalls the unit's heritage. Finally, the anchor of the colonial troops bears the inscription "Somalie".

== Battalion Leaders ==
- May 1916: Battalion Chief Fortin
- 14 July 1916: Captain Depui
- 21 November 1916 until the end of the First World War: Battalion Chief Bouet
- 1944-1945: Battalion Chief Bentzmann

== Inscriptions on its flag ==
Its flag bears the inscriptions:

- VERDUN DOUAUMONT 1916
- MALMAISON 1917
- AISNE 1917 - 1918
- THE MARNE 1918
- NOYON 1918

== Decorations ==
Fourragère in the colors of the Croix de Guerre 1914-1918

During World War I, the 1 Somali rifle received three citations, including two in the army order:

- War Cross 1914-1918 with two palms and a silver star

The battalion is entitled to wear the fourragère in the colours of the ribbon of the 1914-1918 war cross which rewards units cited at least twice in the orders of the army.

At the level of individual citations, during the First World War, there were:

- 9 Legion of Honour crosses (including one for Officer of the Legion of Honour) to the battalion officers
- 35 military medals (9 to Europeans and 26 to Somalis)
- 1,180 citations to order:
  - 31 to the army order (17 to the Europeans and 14 to the Somalis).
  - 51 citations to the order of the army corps (41 to the Europeans, 10 to the Somalis)
  - 109 to the order of the division (92 to the Europeans, 17 to the Somalis)
  - 206 to the brigade order (132 to the Europeans, 74 to the Somalis)
  - 783 to the regimental order (148 to the Europeans, 635 to the Somalis).

During the Second World War, the 1st Battalion of Somali Tirailleurs was awarded a citation in the army order and a citation in the division order within the French Equatorial Africa and Somali Marching Regiment to which it belonged.

== Unit Citations ==
=== First World War ===
==== Citations in the Army Order ====
Citation in the Army Order awarded to the Régiment d'Infanterie Coloniale du Maroc (RICM), as well as to the 43rd battalion of Senegalese riflemen and the 2nd and 4th companies of the Somali battalion after the capture of Fort Douaumont in October 1916:

"On 24 October 1916, reinforced by the 43rd Senegalese battalion and two Somali companies, the RICM captured the first German trenches with an admirable charge; then advanced under the energetic command of Colonel Régnier, successively breaking through the enemy’s resistance over a depth of two kilometers. The regiment inscribed a glorious page in its history by taking, with an irresistible charge, the fort of Douaumont and holding its conquest despite repeated enemy counterattacks."

1st citation in the Army Order awarded to the 1st Somali Riflemen Battalion for its brilliant conduct during the capture of Bohéry quarries and the La Malmaison plateau, General Order No. 529 of 15 November 1917:

"Under the command of Major Bouet, the battalion participated on 23 October 1917 in the attacks of the Moroccan Colonial Infantry Regiment, among which it was distributed. It competed with them in fervor and triumphed in the same glorious battles."

2nd citation in the Army Order awarded to the 1st Somali Riflemen Battalion during the Second Battle of the Aisne, Order No. 11027 D of 28 October 1918:

"Indigenous battalion with a warrior spirit, under the energetic command of Major Bouet, distinguished itself in many battles by its enthusiasm, bravery, and spirit of sacrifice. From 30 May to 4 June, it fought relentlessly, at the cost of many losses, on a very difficult position and succeeded in stopping the enemy. Recently, it demonstrated great maneuvering skills and extreme ardor in pursuing the enemy."

==== Divisional Citations ====
Citation in the order of the division awarded to the 1st battalion of Somali riflemen during the Battle of Chemin des Dames, General Order No. 176 of May 8 1917:

"Under the leadership of his leader, Commander Bouet, during the offensive of May 5th, displayed remarkable courage and enthusiasm, clearing out formidably organized shelters without being stopped by the stiff resistance of the Germans and thus cooperating in the most effective way in the success of the division."

==== Regimental Citations ====
Citation in the regimental order awarded to the 2nd company of the Somali battalion for its conduct during the attacks in front of Longpont in July 1918, Regimental Order No. 11 of January 21, 1919:

"Placed at the disposal of the RICM, the 2nd ^{company} of the 1st ^{battalion} of Somali riflemen, commanded by Lieutenant Baumgartner, participated in the attacks of 18 and July 19, 1918, in front of Longpont, and behaved valiantly there, suffering severe losses without weakening."

=== Second World War ===
==== Citations in the Order of the Army ====
Citation in the order of the Army awarded to the Somali Marching Battalion and the Marching Regiment of French Equatorial Africa for having successfully crossed the water line of the Gua during the fighting at Pointe de Grave, Decision No. 1058 of August 20, 1945:

"Battalion which, under the calm and energetic command of Battalion Commander Bentzmann, has, through its value, bravery and tenacity, succeeded in April 15, 1945, the crossing by force, under the violent and adjusted fire of the enemy, of the water line of the Gua, more than 400 meters wide. By his skilful maneuver he brought down the enemy defense elements of the Gua Bridge. During the day of April 18pushed the enemy back into the strong positions of an anti-tank ditch and, in a single burst, took the village of Vieux Soulac, as well as the very heavily concreted and vigorously defended complex of works constituting the command post of the enemy fortress of Pointe de Grave. During these two days of fighting, took 300 prisoners."

==== Divisional Citations ====
Citation in the order of the division awarded to the Marching Regiment of French Equatorial Africa and Somalia after the fighting for the liberation of Pointe de Grave, General Order No. 102 of April 25, 1945:

“Led for 7 days in the Pointe de Grave from the 14th to April 20, an exceptionally hard fight against an enemy rabid to defend himself, going so far as to blow himself up on the spot rather than surrender, very heavily armed and supported by ironclad works, covered by a flooded terrain whose narrow passes were literally stuffed with mines. Killed 947 Germans, captured 100 concrete works and 90 pieces of cannon, took 3,300 prisoners. A feat of arms which deserves to take its place in the annals of this war."
