= Royan pocket =

Isolated Atlantic pocket held by German troops

Coordinates: 45.698°N 1.243°W

Royan Pocket
- Part of the Liberation of France
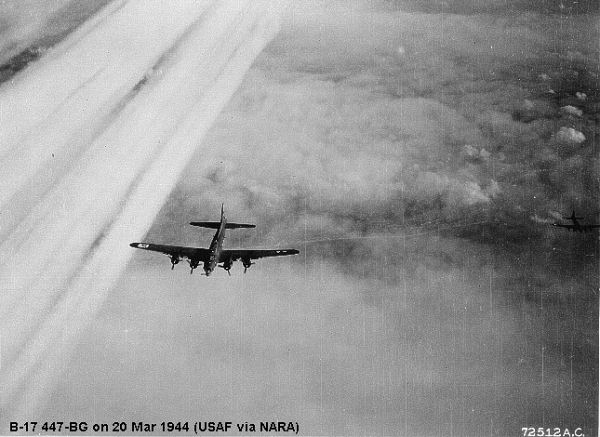
- The USAAF's 447th Bomb Group helped raze the nearby city of Royan.
Date	12 September 1944 - 17/20 April 1945
Location	Royan and Pointe de Grave, Charente-Maritime, France
Result	Allied victory

Belligerents
Germany	France; United States

Commanders and leaders
(Nazi Germany) Hartwig Pohlmann (Nazi Germany) Hans Michahelles	(Provisional Government of the French Republic) Edgard de Larminat (Provisional Government of the French Republic) Henri Adeline (Provisional Government of the French Republic) Jean de Milleret

Units involved
	(Provisional Government of the French Republic) Atlantic Army Detachment (United States) USAAF

Strength
8,000-9,000 men	France : 73,000 men United States : Aerial support

Casualties and losses
circa 1,000 killed 800 wounded 8,000 taken prisoner	364 killed 1,560 wounded 13 missing (attack from 13 until 20 April); 1,500 civilians killed

The Royan pocket (French: Poche de Royan) was one of the Atlantic pockets towards the end of World War II, an isolated position held by German troops left behind as the German army retreated from occupied France. It became important to the German High Command that these pockets be held to deny port facilities to the advancing Allies.

== Description ==
Known to the Germans as the Festungen Girondemündung Nord und Süd ("fortresses north and south of the Gironde estuary"), the pocket was not restricted to Royan itself, but included also the peninsula of Arvert and the island of Oléron north of the Gironde, and a stretch from Pointe de Grave to Saint-Vivien-de-Médoc and Vensac to its south.

== Assault ==
The Royan pocket was fully invested by the autumn of 1944 and plans were drawn up, codenamed "Operation Independence", to assault and to capture the stronghold, but the plans were delayed by the commencement of the German offensive in the Ardennes in December.

The first position to be attacked was the city of Royan, held by 5,500 German troops and inhabited by 3,000 French civilians. The city suffered a strategic bombing on 5 January 1945 by the RAF, but no land assault had been organized to follow up the bombardment and so the front remained static for the next three months. In April 1945, a massive attack by Allied troops, under French General Edgard de Larminat, involved Operation Vénérable with USAAF bombings on the 14th and the 15th, bombardment by the fleet of Vice-Admiral Joseph Rue, and land attack by the 10th French Division and the 66th US Division. The French command apparently had advocated for the French harbours to be retaken by military force, rather than for them to await their eventual surrender by the Germans. The city suffered heavy bombardment by 1,000 planes, including those of the USAAF's 447th Bomb Group, with the result that the city was razed, and 1,500 civilians killed. The historian Howard Zinn, who took part in the operation as a bombardier, later argued that it was militarily unnecessary and a war crime.

Altogether, 27,000 artillery shells were fired over Royan, and the city saw one of the first military uses of napalm on 15 April 1945. Dropped by Allied bombers, it made the city "a blazing furnace".

German forces in Royan capitulated on 17 April. The fighting continued on the other side of the Garonne estuary, particularly in the Coubre forest where the bunkers were manned by sailors from the “Tirpitz” battalion. On 20 April Colonel de Milleret's troops, supported by French reconnaissance and bombing aviation, negotiated and obtained the capitulation of the German forces at Pointe de Grave.

After Royan was taken, Ile d'Oléron was also captured on 30 April in Opération Jupiter, and de Larminat was planning to capture La Rochelle next in Opération Mousquetaire, but the plan was cancelled with the capitulation of Germany. The French regiments that participated in those operations were understrength units incorporating FFI elements: the 50th and 158th Regiments of the French 23rd Infantry Division (known as Division de marche Oléron), in conjunction with the French 2nd Armored Division and other elements.
