= Atlantic pockets =

German attempt to deny French ports to Allied forces

In World War II, the Atlantic pockets were locations along the coasts of the Netherlands, Belgium and France chosen as strongholds by the occupying German forces, to be defended as long as possible against land attack by the Allies.

The locations are known in German as Atlantikfestungen (lit. "Atlantic strongholds") but are known in English as "Atlantic pockets".

Six of the Atlantic pockets were captured by the Allies between June and October 1944. With the Allies' success in gaining access to numerous ports, they placed the remaining Atlantic pockets under siege. Three surrendered in April 1945, and the remainder in May 1945.

Collectively, the Atlantic pockets tied up 210,500 German troops.

== Designation as fortresses ==
On 19 January 1944 Adolf Hitler declared eleven places along the Atlantic Wall to be fortresses (Festungen), to be held until the last man or the last round, calling them Atlantikfestungen (lit. "Atlantic strongholds").

The ports were: IJmuiden, the Hoek van Holland, Dunkirk, Boulogne-sur-Mer, Le Havre, Cherbourg, Saint-Malo, Brest, Lorient, Saint-Nazaire and the Gironde estuary.

In February and March 1944 three more coastal areas were declared to be fortresses: the Channel Islands, Calais and La Rochelle.

Other fortresses were added after D-Day on 6 June 1944 in further directives of 17 August and 4 September.

== Purpose ==
As well as concentrating men and matériel to control the surrounding area, the fortresses' purpose was to deny the use of port facilities to the Allies and to secure their continued use by German submarines in the Battle of the Atlantic. In addition, as long as they remained in German hands, they had propaganda value.

== Fate of the pockets ==
In France, six pockets were captured by the Allies between the initial invasion of Normandy in June 1944 and October 1944, and others brought under siege. Three were liberated by French forces in April 1945, while the remainder surrendered after the capitulation of Germany in May 1945.

== List of Atlantic pockets ==
The Atlantic pockets, with the date any Allied assault began and date the defenders surrendered, are shown below.

Pocket	Place	Garrison	Allied assault began	Surrendered
Cherbourg pocket	Cherbourg	15,000 men	6 June 1944	30 June 1944
Saint-Malo pocket	Saint-Malo	12,000 men	3 August 1944	17 August 1944
Le Havre pocket	Le Havre	14,000 men	10 September 1944	12 September 1944
Brest pocket	Brest	37,000 men	7 August 1944	19 September 1944
Boulogne pocket	Boulogne-sur-Mer	10,000 men	17 September 1944	22 September 1944
Calais pocket	Calais	7,500 men	25 September 1944	30 September 1944
Royan pocket	Royan	5,000 men	12 September 1944	17 April 1945
Pointe de Grave pocket	Pointe de Grave	3,500 men	12 September 1944	20 April 1945
	Île d'Oléron	2,000 men	12 September 1944	30 April 1945
La Rochelle pocket	La Rochelle	11,500 men	12 September 1944	7 May 1945
Dunkirk pocket	Dunkirk	10,000 men	15 September 1944	9 May 1945
Occupied Channel Islands	Channel Islands	28,500 men	No assault	9 May 1945
Lorient pocket	Lorient	24,500 men	12 August 1944	10 May 1945
Saint-Nazaire pocket	Saint-Nazaire	30,000 men	27 August 1944	11 May 1945

== See also ==
- Liberation of France
