= Pornichet German military cemetery =

French cemetery

German military cemetery in Pornichet
- Deutscher Soldatenfriedhof Pornichet 1939–45
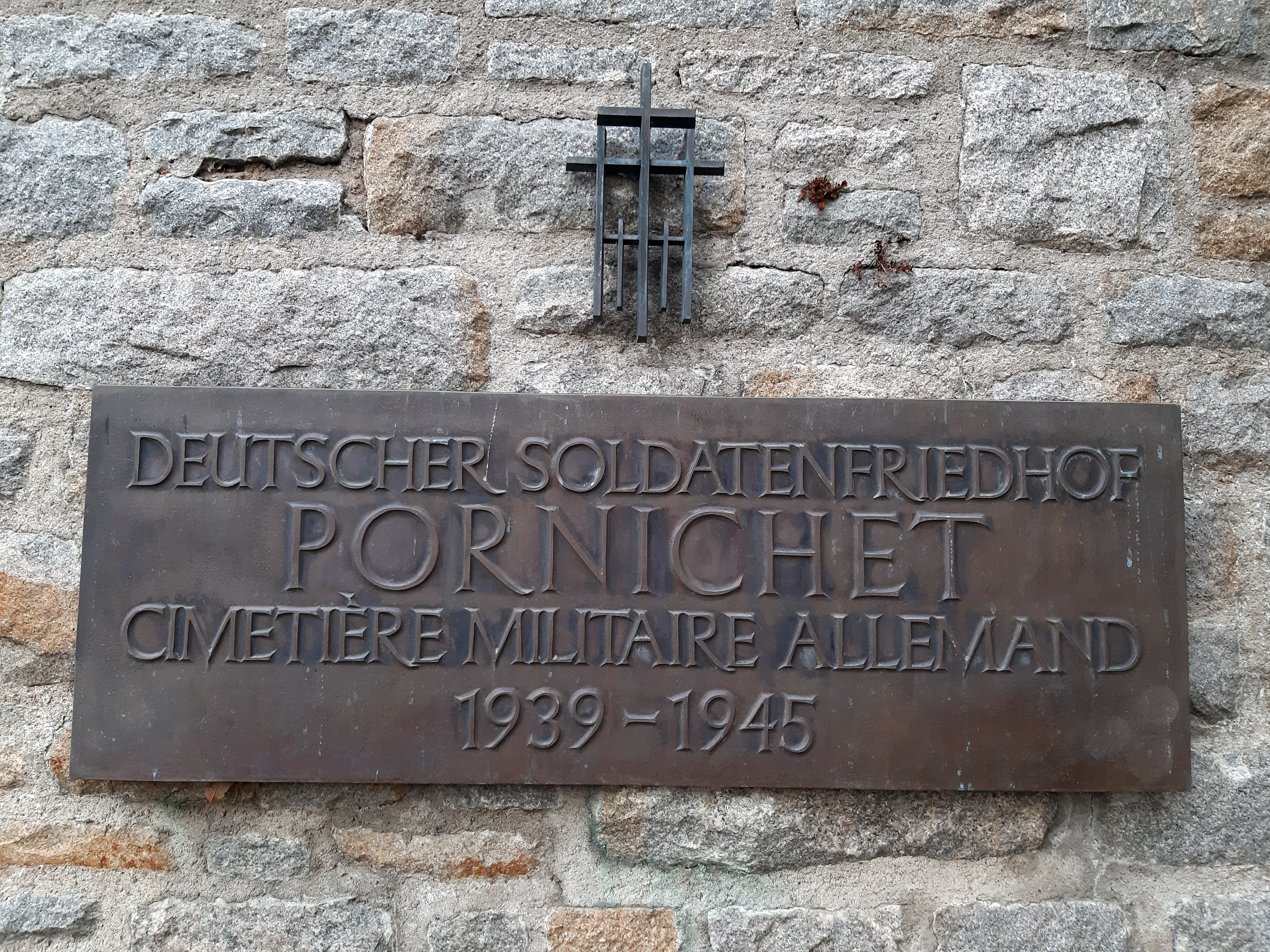
- Plaque at the entrance to the cemetery

Details
- Location: Pornichet, Loire-Atlantique, France
- Country: France
- Coordinates: 47.2582638401216°N 2.320346825450368°W
- Type: Military
- Owned by: Volksbund Deutsche Kriegsgräberfürsorge
- No. of graves: 4,836

The German military cemetery in Pornichet (Deutscher Soldatenfriedhof Pornichet) is a military cemetery and memorial site related to World War II. It is located in the commune of Pornichet, in the Loire-Atlantique department of France.

== Overview ==
The German military cemetery, situated near the municipal cemetery in the Saint-Sébastien district, contains 4,836 graves. The site served as a necropolis during the German occupation by the Wehrmacht. In 1945, French authorities consolidated the burials of German soldiers from the Saint-Nazaire pocket at this location. In 1955, the cemetery was designated a regional burial site for the departments of Loire-Atlantique, Vendée, Maine-et-Loire, and Deux-Sèvres, with an additional 2,200 graves transferred to the site. Among the burials is that of Karl Hotz (block 2, row 21, plaque number 649), a German officer whose death on 20 October 1941 in Nantes led to the execution of 48 hostages.

To reflect the shared fate of the war dead buried here, the graves were intentionally designed to be uniform, without distinctions based on social class or military rank. The cemetery is maintained by the Volksbund Deutsche Kriegsgräberfürsorge (German War Graves Commission, or SESMA in French), which is tasked by the German federal government with the care of German war graves abroad. The organization holds domiciliary rights to the site and operates with the support of French authorities.

== Gallery ==
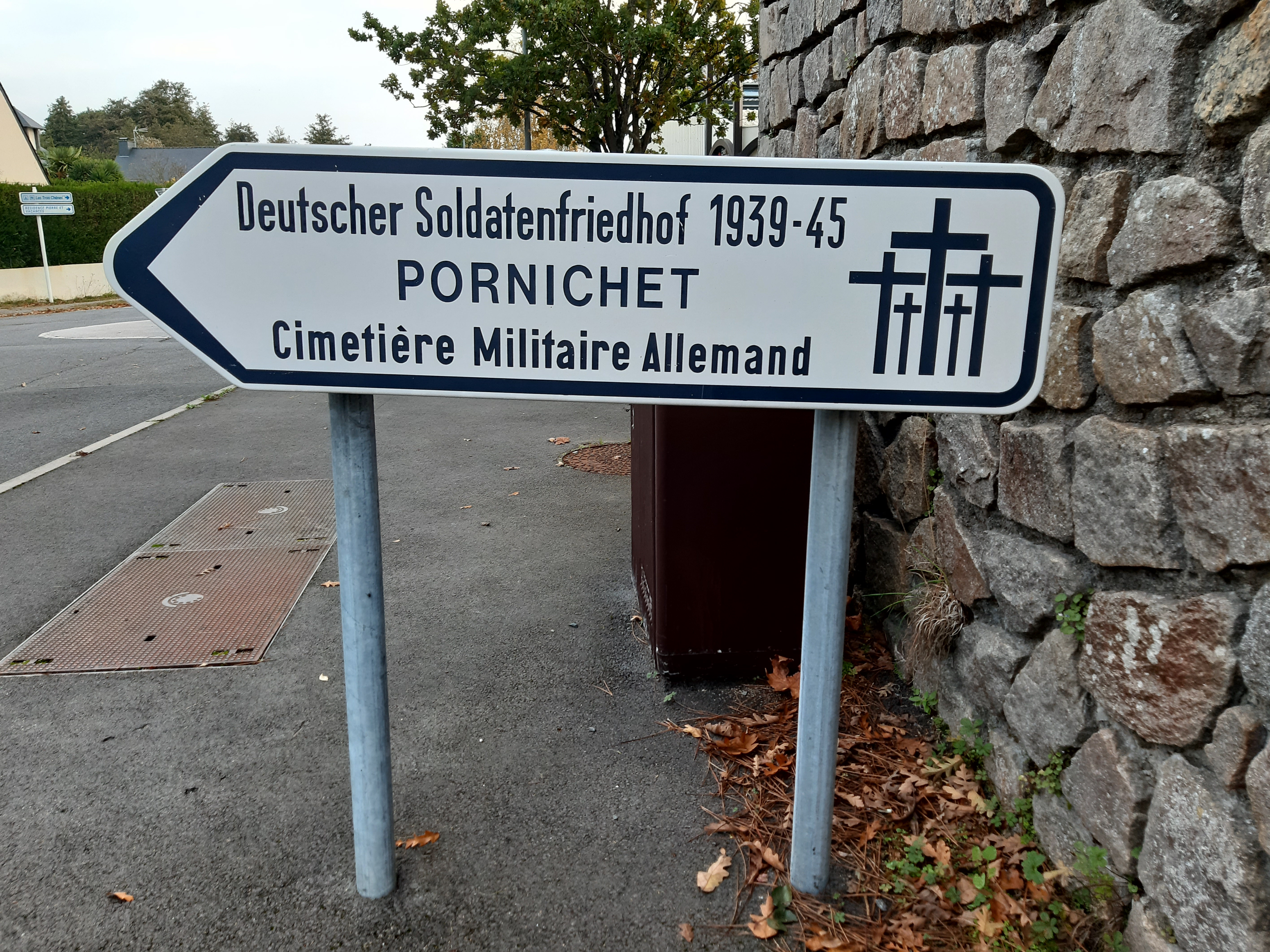
Signage for the German military cemetery in Pornichet

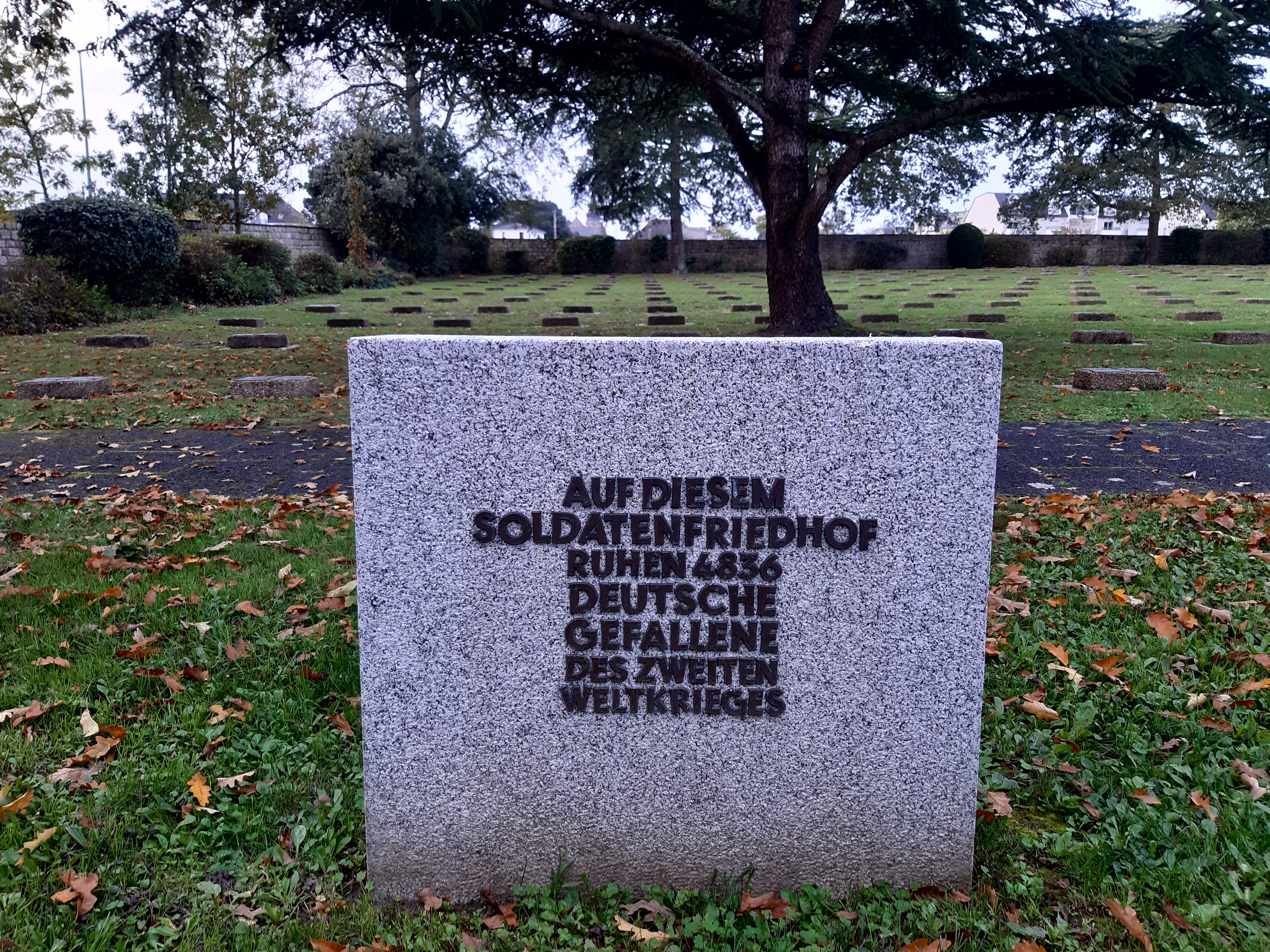
Memorial stone indicating the cemetery contains 4,836 graves of German soldiers from World War II

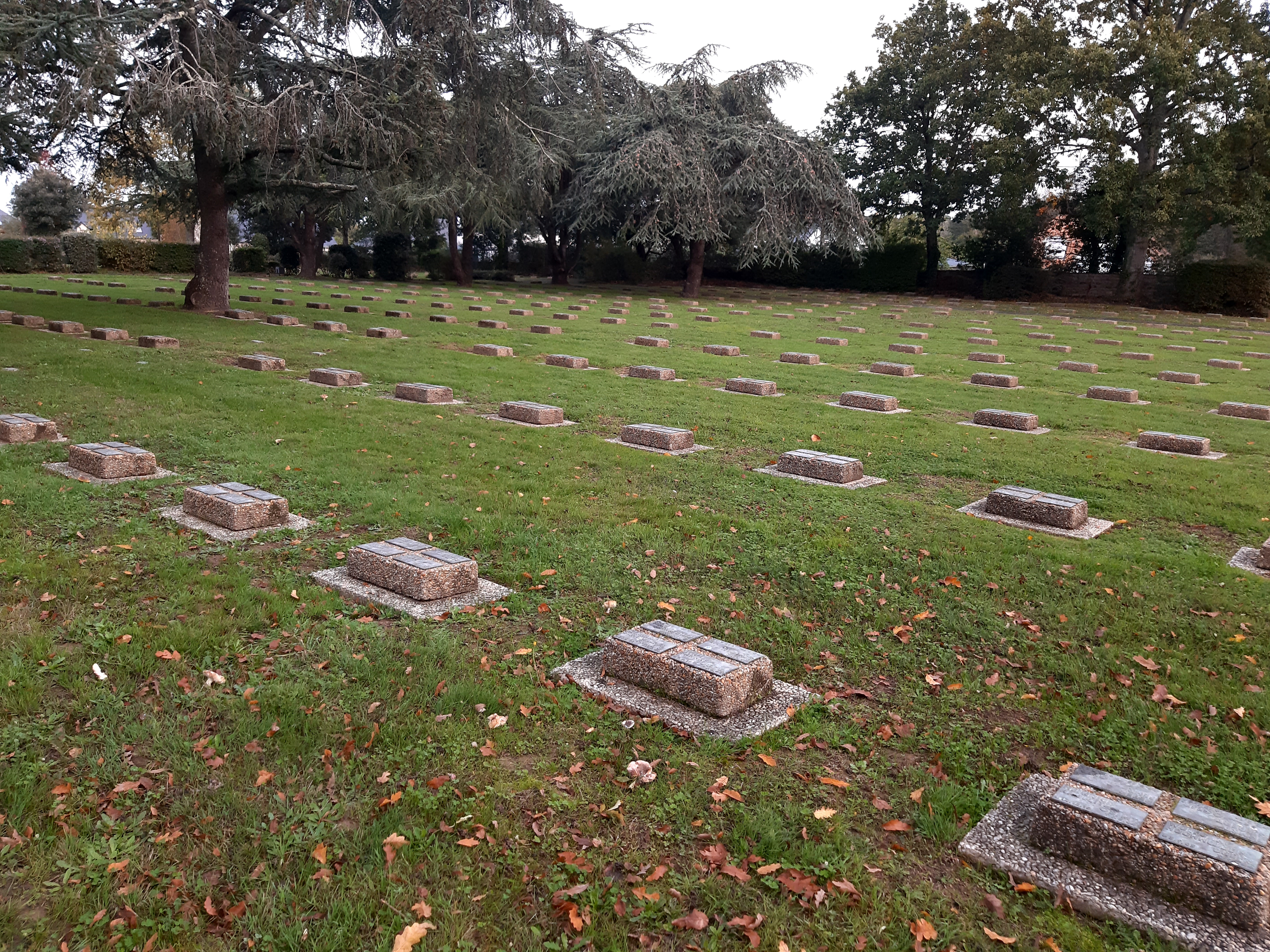
Overview of the cemetery

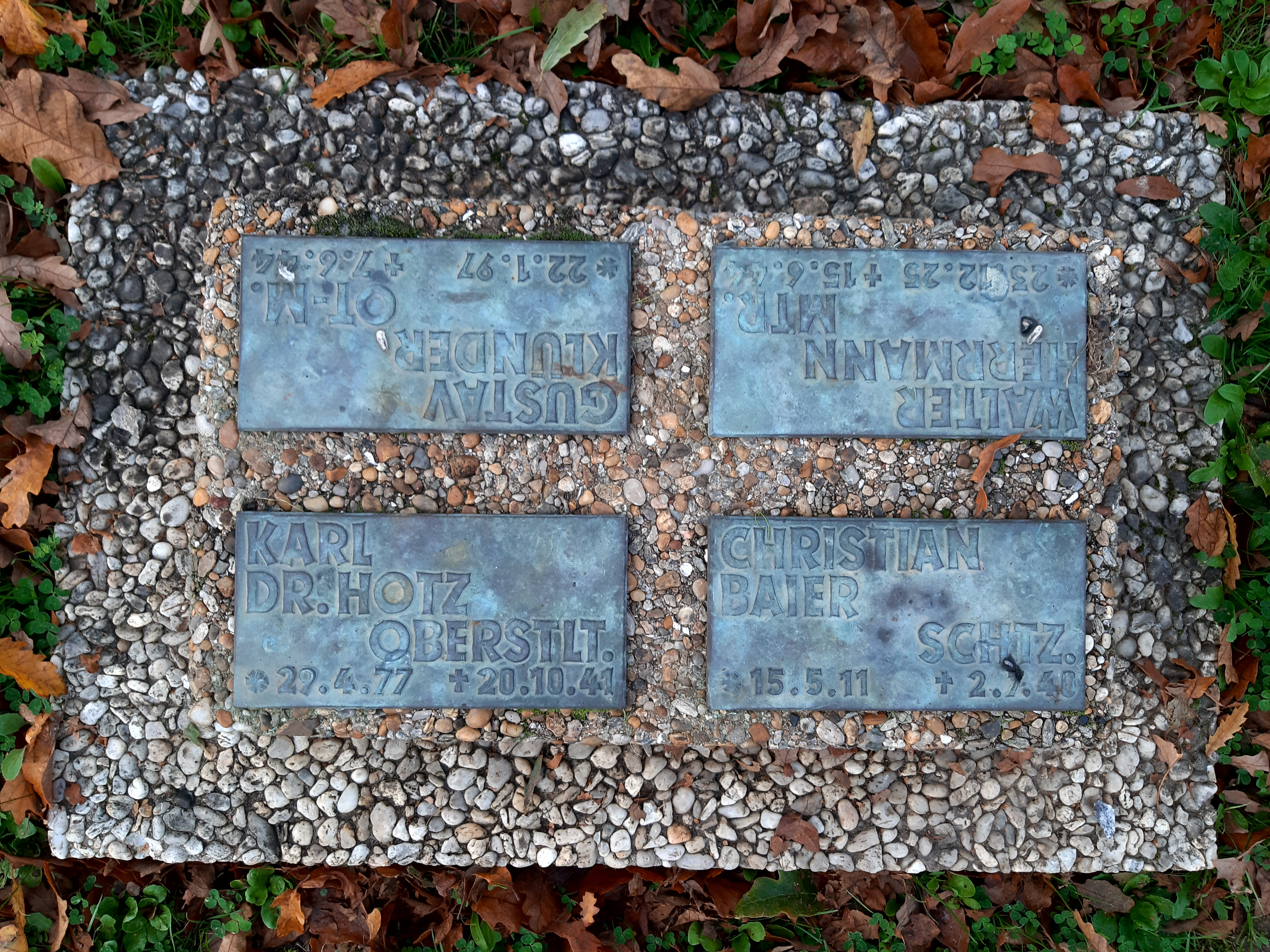
Funeral plaques arranged in groups of four

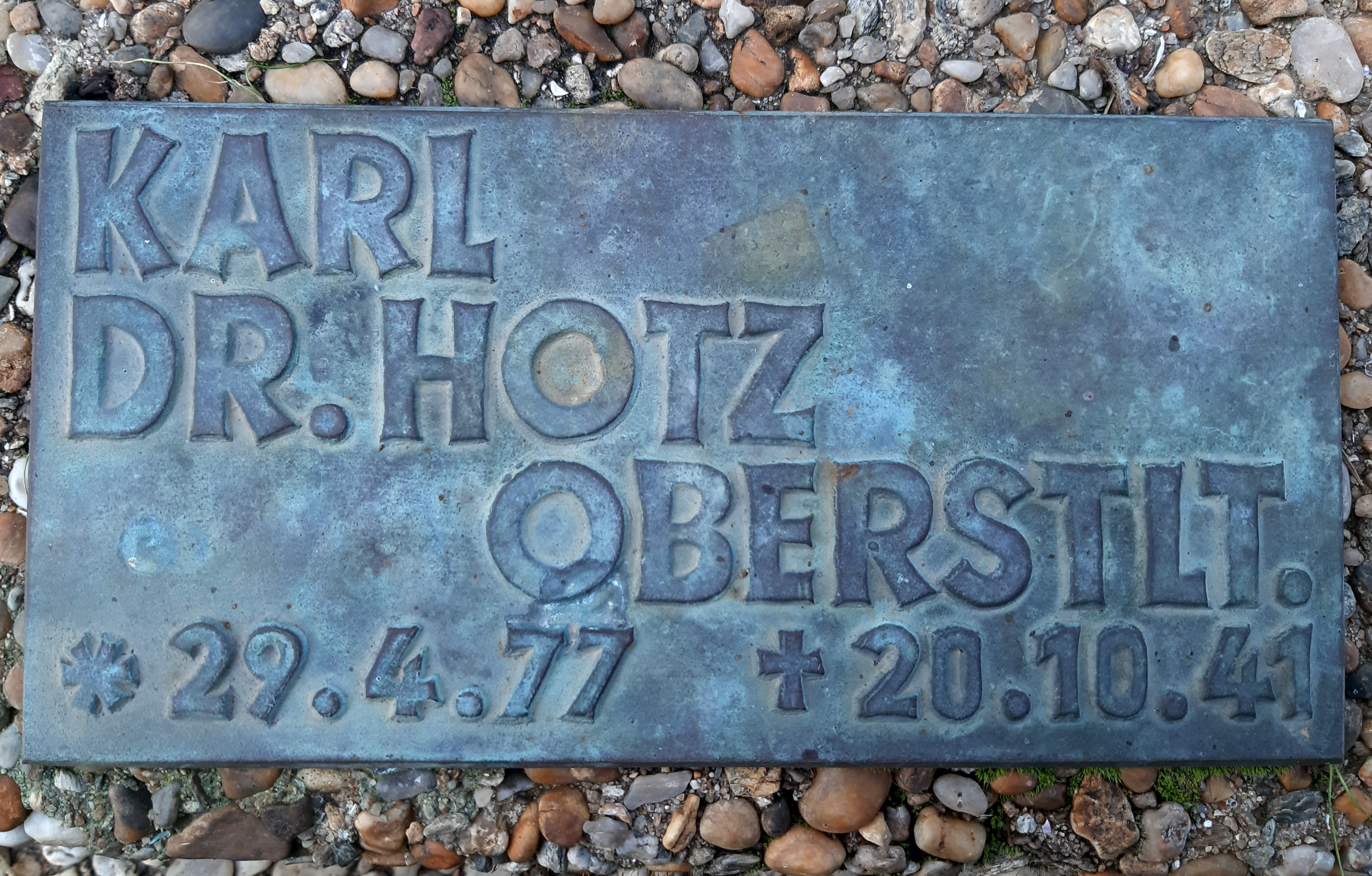
Grave of Karl Hotz (block 2, row 21, plaque number 649)

== See also ==
- German occupation of France during World War II
- Saint-Nazaire pocket
- Volksbund Deutsche Kriegsgräberfürsorge
- Assassination of Karl Hotz
