= Raymond Chomel =

Raymond Emmanuel Marie Siméon Chomel (5 September 1897 in Fourmies – 10 August 1989 in Paris) was a French General and leader of the resistance during World War Two.

== Biography ==
=== With de Gaulle (1940) ===
During the German offensive of May 1940, Major Raymond Chomel was a liaison officer for the French General Headquarters with the 4th Armoured Division, which had just been created and was commanded by Colonel Charles de Gaulle. Chomel's military qualities and his political sense were noticed by Colonel de Gaulle who appointed him on May 23 as his chief of staff and had him prepare the order for the Battle of Abbeville.

As the Under-Secretary of State for War, on 6 June, de Gaulle brought him into his military cabinet in Paris and promoted Chomel to Colonel. They both experienced the eventual collapse of the Third Republic. General de Gaulle evacuated to London on 17 June 1940 and invited members of his cabinet to come with him. Colonel Chomel, however having strong ties to his family in France decided to stay. De Gaulle apparently understood his reasons.

=== Organisation of the internal military resistance ===
After the armistice, Colonel Chomel was appointed chief of staff for the 9th Military Division. Chomel was tempted to join de Gaulle in London but opted to stay in Châteauroux in the Armistice Army, with plans to organise a military resistance for his region. He and a Colonel Bertrand, who commanded the 1st Infantry Regiment, divided up the region between them. Chomel took control of the Indre except Issoudun and part of Vienne and Indre-et-Loire, while Bertrand took the Cher and the rest of the region.

By November 1942, the Germans occupied the Zone libre and Colonel Chomel was ordered to dissolve the 9th Division. He made sure to find civilian posts for as many of his soldiers as possible. He criss-crossed his sector under various pretexts to rally officers from disbanded units and form with them the nuclei of new units. This was the case with Captain Jean Costa de Beauregard (17th Infantry Battalion at Châteauroux), Commander Costantini (32nd Infantry Regiment at Loches) and Commander Fox (27th Infantry Regiment at Le Blanc).

Chomel now formally became part of the Army Resistance Organization (ORA), created by General Frere, and took instructions from his command in Vichy and Limoges. Arms were received from clandestine depots of the Armistice Army and the Allied parachute drops.

By May 1944, Chomel escaped a roundup by the Gestapo and went into hiding under the name of Charles Martel. The military resistance was then organized into three sectors, the sedentary ones, which armed the free corps of sectors for small operations and mobile military troops. Chomel was given command of the mobile troops, grouped as the Charles Martel Marching Brigade.

=== First operations ===
The Brigade was ready to intervene in the Allied landings at Normandy but received an order not to do so. Chomel was also appointed chief of staff and military adviser to the head of the French Forces of the Interior(FFI) in Indre. The Brigade increased its sabotage operations and harassed the occupying forces, in particular any German combat divisions moving towards the Normandy front. The Brigade's radio transmissions and movements, became increasingly monitored by the Germans, which led to losses, such as that of Prince Joachim Murat, a liaison officer of Chomel.

A General Guerrilla Warfare Order was issued on 13 August when two German columns crossed into the sector. The first of these was commanded by a General Täglischbeck. Engagements occurred, in particular near the national roads 675, 725 and 780. It was initially a question of ambushes planned by the Brigade. The first conventional battles took place at Lignac, Clavieres, Preuilly-sur-Claise and Saint-Hippolyte. The engagement at Ecueille on 25 August, led to a German surrender and the capture of five 88mm guns and numerous vehicles which would be used later at the Saint-Nazaire pocket.

General Berlon, commanding the Premier Regiment de France, by then the only remaining Vichy military unit, let it be known in July that he wished to make hand over arrangements with the military resistance. Chomel was informed of this request and began negotiations. The General was arrested unexpectedly on 9 August by uncontrolled FFI elements, but the talks continued with his deputy and led to the incorporation on 22 August of the Regiment's three companies, a cycling squadron, a motorcycling platoon and a mounted squadron. The numbers of the Charles Martel brigade were therefore doubled to 2,350 men, including 100 career officers.

=== Surrender of the Elster column ===
The remainder of the Täglischbeck column managed to retreat across the Loire, followed by another column of General Elster, from the south-west, made up of 25,000 men from various corps. The Charles Martel Brigade attacked these columns. From 4 September, Chomel received formal Allied radio communications allowing him to coordinate with American and English attacks. The retreating column of Elster could now only advance at night. Elster understood that he had little chance of successfully crossing the Loire and began to negotiate discreetly. Chomel and his intelligence officers engaged the General who agreed to a surrender but only wanted to do this with before a formal army, the only one in the vicinity being elements of the American Army. Chomel contacted the Americans who agreed to receive the surrender.

While these arrangements were underway, the column attempted to force a crossing of the Loire at Decize on the night of 9 September, but was prevented from doing so after a four-hour firefight. By the morning of 10 September, officers of the Charles Martel Brigade escorted Elster from his command post at Chateaneuf-sur-Loire, to the sub-prefecture of Issoudun, where negotiations would continue. Chomel asked the Americans the day before to suspend air attacks, earning him the confidence of the German general staff. At 4 p.m., Elster signed his surrender to the American General Macon, in the presence of Chomel, who countersigned.

A second ceremony took place at the town hall of Arçay, the next day, in the Cher, at the request of Colonel Bertrand, commanding the FFI, but Elster refused to sign a second time. A third ceremony took place on 14 September at Beaugency Bridge. General Elster handed his pistol to General Macon and 18,500 Germans were thus taken prisoner, including 2 general officers. For its part, the Charles Martel Brigade had suffered 74 dead and 786 wounded whilst the Germans had 800 killed, 1500 wounded, 200 prisoners, 110 trucks and 14 guns destroyed or captured.

=== Surrender of the Saint-Nazaire Pocket ===
On 26 October 1944, General de Larminat, commander of the French Forces of the West, appointed Colonel Chomel commander of the subordinate French Forces of the Loire-Inférieure (FFLI), which included, in addition to the Charles Martel Brigade, 5 marching battalions of the FFI of the Loire-Inferiere, 3 battalions of Maine-et-Loire, 2 battalions from Ille-et-Vilaine and various other units.

The Germans were cornered in the pocket, while the main Allied armies advanced in an easterly direction. There was no need to launch an offensive, which would be costly. The objective was to contain the Germans in the pockets perimeter. There was also a question of protecting a civilian population of about 130,000 without antagonizing the Germans. Chomels' forces were also tasked with ensuring as much as possible of the port was returned intact. Chomel organized three sectors around the pocket:

- Fegreac (27th Infantry Regiment under Lieutenant-Colonel Fox)
- Saint-Etienne-de-Montluc (32nd Infantry Regiment and 17th Infantry Battalion under Lieutenant Rene Costantini)
- Around the south of the Loire (8th Regiment of Cuirassiers)

The Charles Martel Brigade, which now had 2,600 men, took the name of the 25th Infantry Division, firstly under the command of Chomel then under Colonel Ghislain as Chomel had been appointed Brigadier General on 25 December 1944.

General Chomel accompanied General de Gaulle during his visit to Saint-Nazaire on 14 January 1945, when it received the Cross of the Liberation. The 32nd Infantry Regiment rendered the honours. On 25 January, the FFI battalions were dissolved and integrated into the 25th Division, which now had 30,000 soldiers.

After the final general capitulation of the German Armies, the forces occupying the pocket of Saint-Nazaire finally surrendered. The Germans signed this surrender at Cordemais before negotiators of the American and French Armies. On 11 May, at the Grand Clos racecourse in Bouvron, General Hans Junck handed over his pistol to American General Kramer in the presence General Chomel. 28,000 Germans were taken prisoner, including 2 generals and 2 admirals whilst the Saint-Nazaire facilities were returned to working order.

=== Post War Years ===
Chomel joined General de Gaulle, now President of the Provisional Government of the French Republic, as a member of his military cabinet. He became his military chief of staff in the fall of 1945 and remained so until the departure of General on 21 January 1946

Chomel was then appointed commander of the Staff School (1945-1949), then the 3rd Infantry Division (1951-1954) and of the 2nd Army Corps (1954-1957). He was a member of the Superior Council of War in 1957 and joined the reserve in 1962.

Lieutenant-General Raymond Chomel died at the age of 91.

== Awards ==
- Grand Officer of the Legion of Honour
- War Cross 1914-1918
- Croix de Guerre 1939–1945 with palms
- Medal of the Resistance with rosette

== Memorials ==
- General Raymond Chomel Street in Fourmies
- Commemorative plaque in the courtyard of the sub-prefecture of Issoudun
- Monument of the surrender in Bouvron

== Research Sources ==
- Marcel Baudot, Liberation of Brittany, 223 p., Hachette, Paris, 1974
- Colonel Jean Druart, Le maquis d'Épernon, 32nd infantry regiment, Charles Martel Brigade, 202 p., ed. Hérault, Mondevrier, 1991 (ISBN 2-7407-0023-7)
- General Raymond Chomel, "With the Charles Martel Brigade in the Berry Maquis", in The 40s, No. 67, Tallandier-Hachette, Paris
- "The death of a liberator", in Presse-Océan, August 12, 1989, Nantes
- Danielle Bernard, "General Chomel and the Charles Martel brigade, military training in the Resistance", symposium Soldiers in Resistance in the Center Region, April 4, 2012, Nevers.
- Defense Historical Service, General Chomel collection, IK 561.
- General Raymond Chomel, With the Charles Martel Brigade in the Berry Maquis, in The 1940s, No. 67, Tallandier-Hachette
- March Diary of the 25th Infantry Division
- Marcel Baudot, Liberation of Brittany, 223 p., Hachette, Paris, 1974
- Colonel Jean Druart, Le maquis d'Épernon, 32nd infantry regiment, Charles Martel brigade, 202 p., ed. Hérault, Mondévrier, 1991 (ISBN 2-7407-0023-7)
- Resistance and Liberation in Western Indre, Daniel Chartier, chapter The Charles Martel Brigade, p. 25-34, Alan Sutton, Saint-Cyr-sur-Loire, 2004 (ISBN 2-84253-995-8)
