= Surrender of General Botho Elster =

17 September 1944 episode during World War II

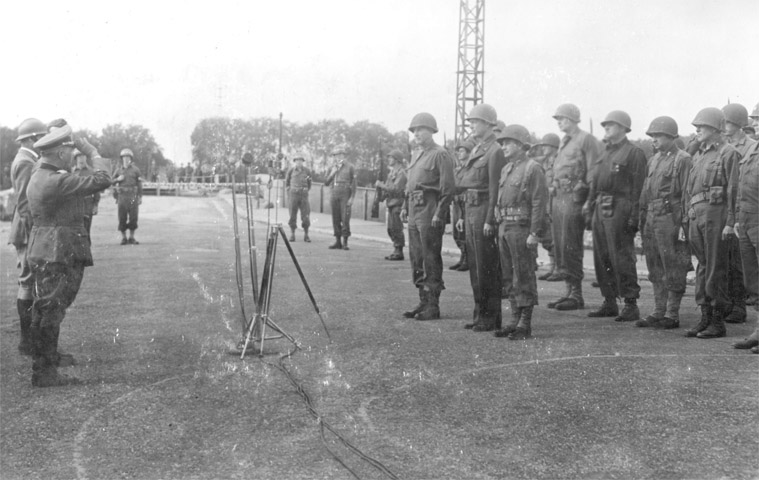
General Elster (left) surrenders to U.S. Generals Robert C. Macon and Otto P. Weyland, 17 September 1944

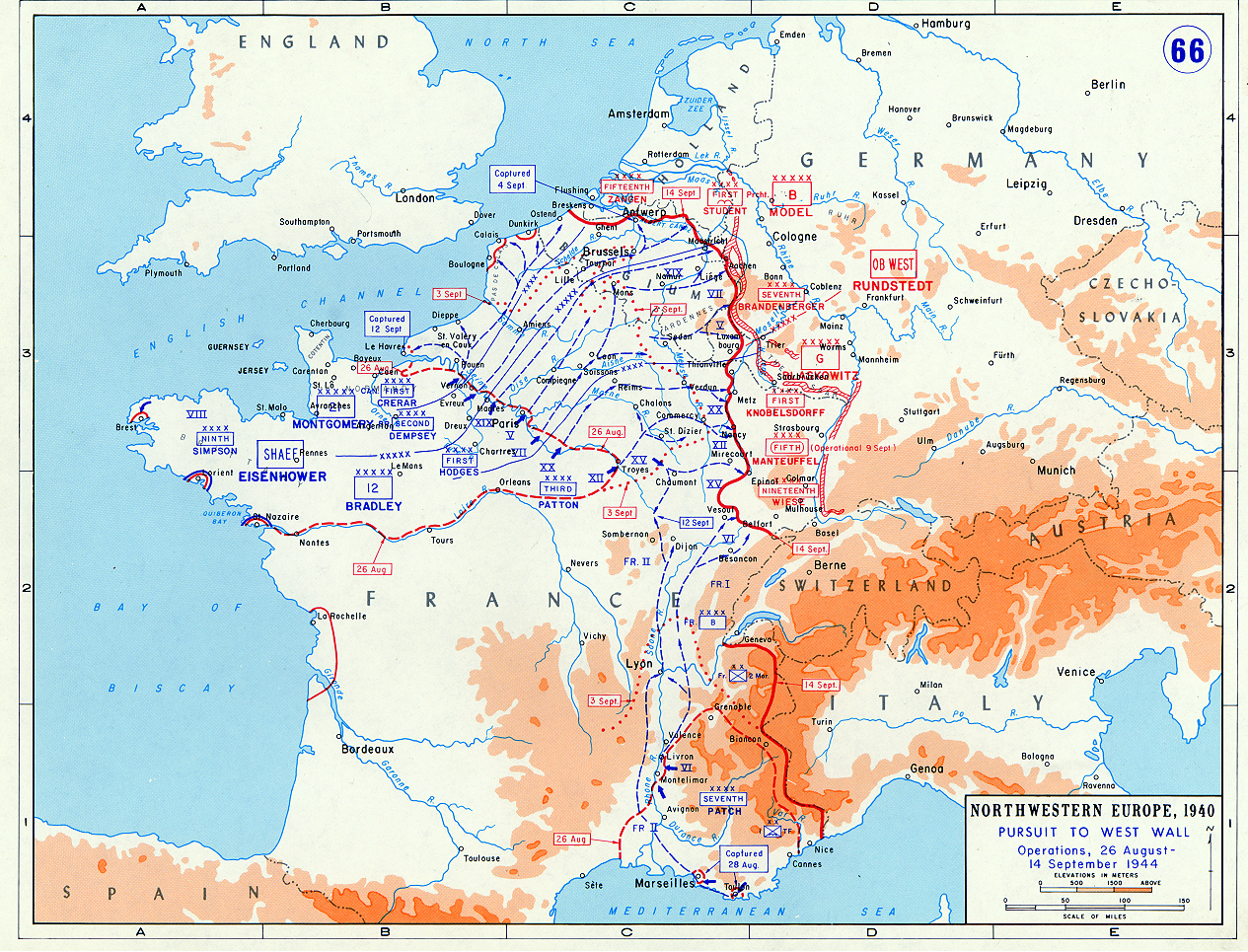
The military situation in France in September 1944. Elster was south of the Loire River with Allied forces between him and other German armies.

The surrender of Major General Botho Elster and more than 19,000 German soldiers to the United States Army during World War II took place on 17 September 1944 at Beaugency, France. Elster and his soldiers were attempting to escape from France which was rapidly being freed from occupation by Nazi Germany by Allied military forces. With his escape route to Germany cut off by Allied armies, surrounded by French Resistance fighters, and attacked by Allied air forces, Elster negotiated a surrender to the United States Army. Members of the French Resistance criticized the surrender as it did not give credit to the Resistance for its contribution to Elster's surrender.

== Prelude ==
After the Normandy Invasion of France, General George Patton and U.S. Third Army's rapid advance in August 1944 had the Loire River as its southern boundary. To protect the Third Army's flank, the 83rd Infantry Division commanded by Major General Robert C. Macon was ordered to deploy along the north bank of the Loire for 300 kilometers (190 miles) from the Atlantic Ocean to a point east of the city of Orleans. While the Allied armies were advancing through northern France, the U.S. Army invaded southern France near Marseille in Operation Dragoon and advanced northward rapidly. By early September nearly all of France was under the control of the Allied forces.

In southwestern France, Major General Botho Elster, the German commander at Mont-de-Marsan, had brutally suppressed the French Resistance by the "most ruthless and harshest means." On 23 August, it was clear that Elster would soon be surrounded by the Allies in southwestern France, and the first elements of his 20,000 men left Mont-de-Marsan to attempt to march across France and escape to Germany. His force was a motley group of soldiers, sailors, policemen, customs officials and others, many of them transported in horse-drawn wagons or riding bicycles or walking. They were more interested in escaping than fighting and feared reprisals from the Resistance. The shortest route to Germany was via Dijon to the Belfort Gap, but that route was being closed by the advance of Allied forces. Elster initially headed north toward Poitiers, then turned eastward to Issoudun in Indre Department. To minimize the impact of Allied air raids, Elster's force was spread out over many miles of road.

Elster's retreat was harassed by the Resistance, allied with and supplied by clandestine Jedburgh teams and British Special Operations Executive (SOE) agents, and Allied air forces. The aggressive and effective French Resistance forces in Indre Department consisted of about 6,000 fighters in several different organizations loosely affiliated with the Charles Martel Brigade, and supplied with arms by SOE agent Pearl Witherington. The 83rd Infantry blocked Elster's way north by occupying the north bank of the Loire River. A French army of 30,000 men, called the "Schneider Column," moved into place on 7 September, blocking Elster from continuing eastwards. On the same day, the United States Army Air Force and the Royal Air Force bombed Elster's men near the city of Châteauroux, killing 400 Germans and 300 horses and destroying 70 vehicles. Elster was effectively surrounded by the French Resistance, although not in immediate danger of a ground attack by the United States Army which had no large forces nearby.

The French Resistance demanded Elster's surrender on August 29, but there was no response from the Germans.

== Sam Magill and negotiations ==
Lieutenant Sam Magill was the 24-year-old commander of the Intelligence and Reconnaissance Platoon of the 329th Infantry Regiment of the U.S. Army. His platoon consisted of 24 American soldiers plus volunteers from several European countries. The platoon, whose members spoke 12 European languages, was called the Platoon International. Magill's regiment was sparsely scattered along the north bank of the Loire River between the cities of Blois and Orleans to guard the flank of the U.S. Army. The 329th had been ordered not to cross the Loire, but Magill, a driver, a radio operator, and Belgian interpreter Felix van de Valle, crossed the river by raft on 7 September to reconnoiter the area. Magill was informed by the French Resistance that a German force wished to surrender and he proceeded with two French captains and Tommy Macpherson, a kilt-wearing Jedburgh operative, to Issoudun, flying a white flag and encountering thousands of German soldiers. In Issoudun Magill and his colleagues met with General Elster who outlined the terms for his surrender, which included a show of force by at least two battalions of the American army to justify his capitulation. Elster insisted that he would only negotiate with and surrender to the Americans, not to the French Resistance.

Magill returned to his base and reported to General Macon, commander of the 83rd Infantry. Macon refused to stage an infantry show of force as his units were widely scattered. Instead, he arranged for a show of force by the U.S. Army Air Force, and the next day, 8 September, Magill returned to Issoudun to meet again with Elster. At 2:47 p.m. that day, sixteen Republic P-47 Thunderbolts overflew the German army at treetop level. Magill offered Elster alternatives: negotiate a surrender or be bombed by the Thunderbolts. Elster chose to negotiate.

== Surrender ==
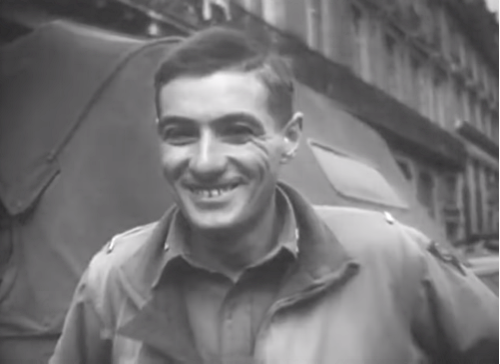
Lt. Sam Magill at the surrender.

The prospect of the surrender of 20,000 Germans excited the interest of the media, and journalists accompanied American liaison officers to Elster's headquarters in Issoudun to record the surrender on film and in print. On 10 September, General Macon journeyed to Issoudun to negotiate and sign a preliminary surrender agreement. Major Arthur H. Clutton of the Jedburghs signed the agreement on behalf of the British and for French Resistance leader Raymond Chomel, who had arranged the ceremony. The atmosphere of the negotiations was described as one of "two great gentlemen making an agreement in circumstances only marred by the presence of some troublesome Frenchmen." Negotiations between Elster and Macon were in English, which Chomel did not understand.

Elster persuaded Macon that the Germans were in danger of being attacked by the French Resistance if they surrendered their weapons and Macon agreed that the Germans could keep their arms while marching 120 kilometers (75 miles) through territory controlled by the Resistance to Beaugency for a formal surrender on the north side of the Loire River in American-controlled territory. The danger of reprisals from the resistance fighters was probably real, as the Germans had committed numerous atrocities during their march northward.

The U.S. Army Air Force took its share of the credit for the surrender. "For the first time in history," said one author, ignoring the existence of the Resistance and the fact that the airforce presence was mainly a pro forma show of force, "airplanes, unaided by ground troops, had forced the surrender of a large enemy force."

The surrender terms were not universally acclaimed. Resistance leader and SOE agent, Philippe de Vomécourt, feared that a battle would break out between the Germans and the Resistance during the march to Beaugency, and journeyed to meet with General Patton to try to get the terms of the surrender agreement changed. De Vomécourt argued that the agreement with Elster violated the unconditional surrender policy of the Allies. Vomécourt said that Patton agreed with him, but, while returning to his base, de Vomécourt was injured in an automobile accident and was unable to deliver Patton's order to renegotiate the surrender.

The German march from Issoudun to Beaugency through territory controlled by the Resistance was more of triumph than humiliation. "They swaggered, they flaunted their standards and flags. They even sang German marching songs as they went through the villages where...only one week before, they had murdered local people." Clutton and his Jedburgh team and Sam Magill and his platoon were among those who escorted the Germans to Beaugency. A worry during the march was that the Germans might loot the Château de Valençay where art treasures from the Louvre such as the Winged Victory of Samothrace and the Venus de Milo were hidden for safekeeping. Magill's platoon laid down land mines on the entrance road to the Chateau to ensure that no German soldiers passed that way.

On September 17, 1944, with newsreel cameras rolling in what was described "as the best covered surrender of this, or any war," a formal surrender ceremony was conducted on the Beagency bridge over the Loire River with Generals Elster, Macon, and Otto P. Weyland of the Army Air Force presiding. No representatives of the French Resistance were invited to the ceremony. Sam Magill was belatedly invited to stand among the colonels and generals, causing some consternation that a mere lieutenant was "gate-crashing." Magill was later invited to Paris and allotted four minutes to tell the story of his platoon to the media.

The French Resistance was excluded from the surrender and its "most tangible contribution" to the liberation of France "was not even registered in the annals."

Elster surrendered 754 officers, 18,850 men, and two women. The equipment surrendered included 400 trucks, 1,000 wagons, 2,000 horses, and 4,000 automatic weapons, plus armored cars, artillery and small arms.

== Aftermath ==
SOE agent Pearl Witherington was furious at the lenient treatment of Elster's Germans and the exclusion of the Resistance from the surrender. She said that "General Macon was completely ignorant of the fact that the capitulation of the Germans was due entirely" to the French Resistance. Moreover, she complained that the Americans showered the German soldiers with oranges, chocolate, and American cigarettes, luxuries denied the French population during the war. "Her boys," she said, "were not soldiers but freedom fighters" but "we [the Resistance fighters] liberated France south of the Loire." On 21 September she was ordered to return to London with the British agents she led.

Arthur Clutton of the Jedburghs tried to get the terms of the surrender agreement enforced. The agreement had called for the French Resistance to be given the surrendered German arms, but Charles de Gaulle, head of the French provisional government, blocked that, fearing that the arms would fall into the hands of resistance groups, especially communists, opposed to his government. Clutton also tried to get the captured German vehicles and horses, most of them stolen, returned to French civilians. The horses, he said, were dying of neglect. Instead, on 25 September, his mission was terminated and he was ordered to Paris.

Their exclusion from the surrender agreement and its spoils was a bitter pill to the French Resistance. Local French citizens burned American flags and sent outraged letters to local and national newspapers.

Sam Magill was deemed "irreplaceable" as the leader of the Intelligence and Reconnaissance platoon. He ended World War II as a lieutenant. France awarded him a Croix de Guerre and the U.S gave him a Legion of Merit. He rejoined the army in 1950 as an intelligence officer, retired as a lieutenant colonel in 1969, and lived in Munich, Germany until his death in 2013. After his military retirement, he worked as a technical adviser for many movies about World War II. Botho Elster was sentenced to death (in absentia) by a Nazi military court on 7 March 1945 for surrendering without permission. He died of a heart attack in Germany in 1952 and was exonerated by denazification procedures in 1998.
