= Saint-Nazaire pocket =

German stronghold in World War 2

Saint-Nazaire Pocket
- Part of the Liberation of France
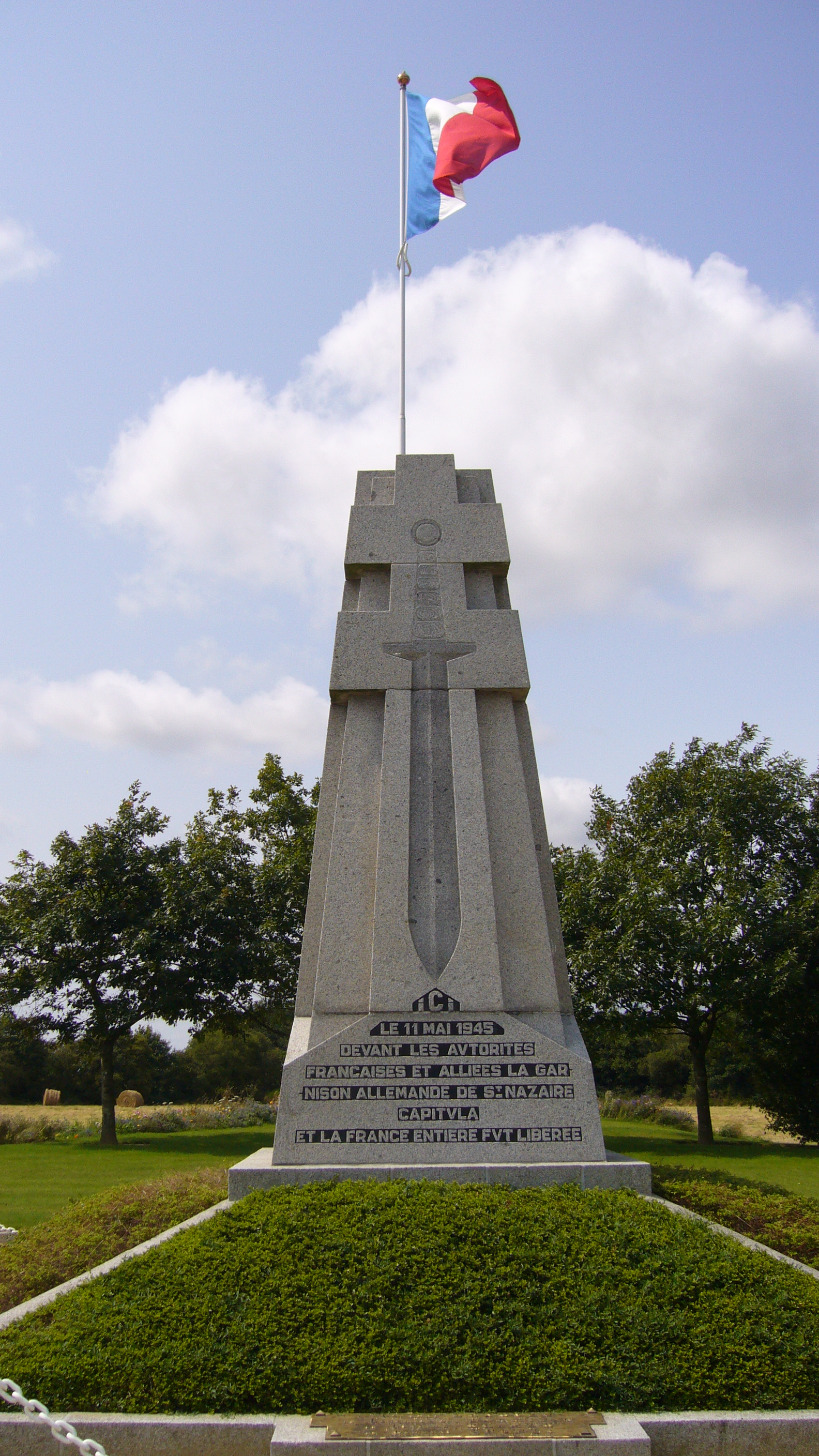
- Monument to the surrender, Bouvron
Date	27 August 1944 - 11 May 1945
Location	Saint-Nazaire, Loire Atlantique, France 47.2806°N 2.2086°W
Result	Eventual Allied victory

Belligerents
Germany	France (18 000 men) United States (1800 men)

Commanders and leaders
(Nazi Germany) Hans Junck (Nazi Germany) Hans Mirow	(United States) Harry J. Malony, then Herman Frederick Kramer (Provisional Government of the French Republic) Colonel Raymond Chomel

Units involved
	(United States) 4th AD then 6th AD then 94th Infantry Division then 66th Infantry Division (Provisional Government of the French Republic) FFI and FTP becoming 25th Infantry Division (France)

Strength
28,000 men	9,000 men 16,500 men/18,000 men

Casualties and losses
Unknown	United States: Unknown; Free French: circa 500 killed, injured or taken prisoner

The Saint-Nazaire Pocket (German: Festung St. Nazaire, French: Poche de Saint-Nazaire) was an Atlantic pocket that existed from August 1944 until 11 May 1945 and was formed by the withdrawal of German troops from Loire-Inférieure (now Loire-Atlantique) during the liberation of the department by the allied forces. It was centred around the port and the submarine base of Saint-Nazaire and extended to the east as far as Saint-Omer-de-Blain and from La Roche-Bernard in the north to Pornic in the south.

== Background ==
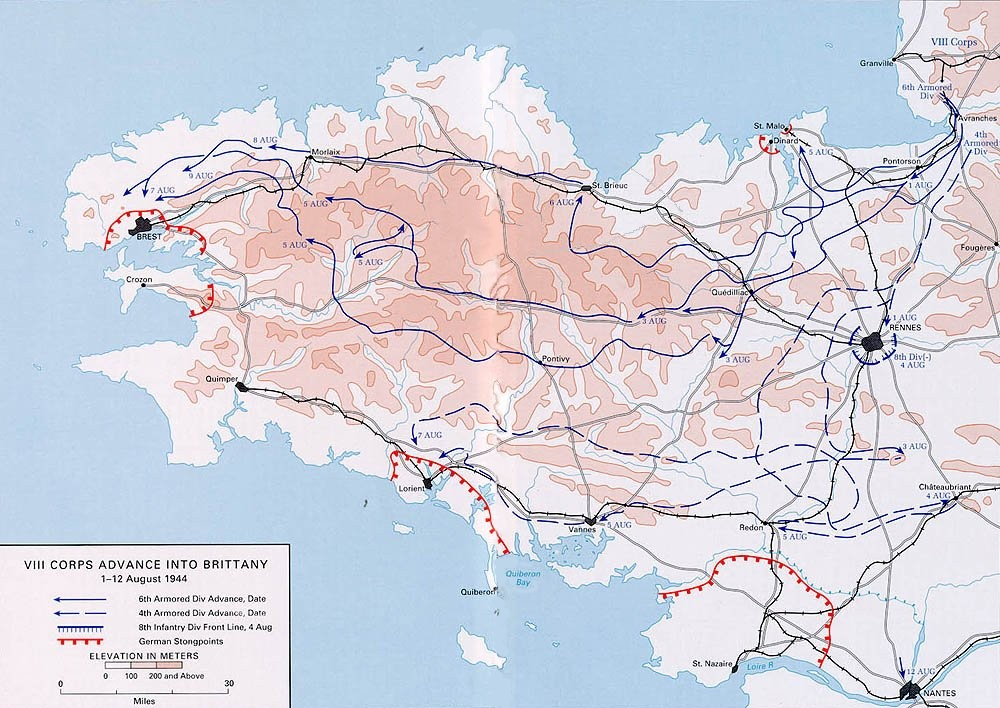
US advance into Brittany early August 1944

After the battle of Normandy and Operation Cobra, the Allies quickly liberated the west of France during the first fortnight of August 1944 (Rennes on 6 August, Nantes on the 12th, Rezé on the 29th). Pockets of resistance however formed as German troops withdrew to the Atlantic coastal ports of Brest, Lorient, Saint-Nazaire, La Rochelle and Royan.

The Germans wanted to retain these strategic areas and declared them "fortresses" (German: Festung). On 31 July 1944, Hitler ordered his Generals Jodl and Warlimont to "defend them to the last man". The hope was that these could once again become significant footholds on the Atlantic in the event that the secret weapons (Wunderwaffe) would be developed in time to turn the war back in the Reich's favour.

Also denying the Allies these deep-water ports would hamper operations following the Normandy campaign. The Allies also favoured a mainly eastward advance of the offensive towards Germany. They however left troops to protect the edges of these pockets, assisted by the French army and by battalions of the French Forces of the Interior (FFI) and Francs-Tireurs et Partisans (FTP).

The Brest pocket fell on 18 September 1944 after hard fighting, the other four lasted until the surrender of the 8 May 1945, or shortly thereafter.

== German defences ==
This particular pocket centered on the town and fortified submarine base of Saint-Nazaire but spread out further. North of the Loire, the front line followed the left bank of the Vilaine river, then the Isac (the Nantes-Brest canal), as far as the part of Blain west of the canal; it then descended south-west to Cordemais, passing between Bouvron, Fay-de-Bretagne and Le Temple-de-Bretagne. South of the Loire, it included the municipalities of Frossay, Saint-Viaud, Paimbœuf, Arthon-en-Retz (La Sicaudais), Saint-Père-en-Retz, Saint-Brevin-les-Pins, Saint-Michel-Chef-Chef, La Plaine-sur-Mer, Préfailles, Sainte-Marie-sur-Mer and Pornic. The coastal defensive sector of the pocket stretched over approximately 50 kilometres (31 miles) of coastline.

The Germans set up artillery batteries to defend the mouth of the Loire:

- A battery of two 240mm calibre guns of French origin was sited to the north at Batz-sur-Mer.
- A similar battery was located south of the Loire on the Pointe Saint-Gildas.
- Between these two batteries were other more modest calibre guns, in particular at the Pointe de Chémoulin with four 170 mm guns and four 105 mm guns, or, on the south shore, at Mindin and Pointeau in the commune of Saint-Brevin-les-Pins.
- There were also anti-aircraft defences comprising 80 large calibre pieces divided into about twenty batteries.

In total, the Germans had 700 guns of all kinds (fixed, mobile and anti-aircraft), with a higher density around the submarine base, the port facilities and the airfield.

Closer to Saint-Nazaire, there was a belt of anti-tank ditches. The perimeter started from Fort de l'Ève, then north, crossing Marsac, Trignac, then along the Grande Brière marshes, Montoir-de-Bretagne until reaching the estuary coast at Donges. South of the Loire, the belt described a circle from Paimboeuf to the south of Saint-Brevin.

Altogether it is estimated that this pocket fortress had 28,000 German soldiers commanded by Aviation General Hans Junck. The submarine base remained under the command of Admiral Hans Mirow.

== Allied forces around the pocket ==
The isolation of the German forces was mainly entrusted to the units of the French Resistance:

- The Brigade Charles Martel under (General Raymond Chomel),
- FFI and FTP battalions from Nantes, Vendee etc. French Resistance units were mainly armed with small arms and captured 75 mm and 105 mm guns.
- These were supported by units of the 94th US Infantry Division under Malony, divided between pockets in Lorient and Saint-Nazaire.
- At the end of December 1944 the 94th Division were relieved by the 66th US Infantry Division under Kramer.

== Civilians ==
The pocket also contained nearly 130,000 civilians. By October 1944, a large number of them (women and children) were allowed to leave the pocket, easing pressure on the Germans to feed them.

Other convoys were subsequently organized by the Red Cross.

Trains left the pocket near Cordemais. A temporary truce was observed between the belligerents during their journey. The refugees, once in Allied controlled Nantes, were subject to a questioning at the premises of the Lycée Georges Clemenceau, partly occupied by the American army.

Other inhabitants left the pocket by their own means, in particular on its eastern and southern limits: for example, some of the inhabitants of Fession (Saint-Omer-de-Blain) left their farms, under constant American mortar fire at the end of November 1944, and went east through the mined lines.

Between November 1944 and February 1945, the Germans gradually evacuated the surroundings of the eastern front of (Fession and Saint-Gabriel in Saint-Omer, other localities in Bouvron and Fay-de-Bretagne); where inhabitants were invited to fall back inside the pocket or to leave on trains organised by the Red Cross.

The details of these evacuations are detailed by Father François du Plessis de Grenédan (1921–2013), Sulpician priest, son of the commander of the airship Dixmude, a chaplain of the FTP and FFI maquisards of the Saint-Nazaire Pocket (south, then north), worker-priest, in an interview book in 2007.

== Military operations ==
Faced with fierce German resistance during the assault on Brest, the Allied High Command decided not to attempt a similar assault on Saint-Nazaire.

After several raids launched in September and October against the FFI troops on the other side of the Vilaine river, the Germans carried out a new attack in the eastern sector at the beginning of November.

Apart from a small landing made in December at the Pointe de Pen Lan in Morbihan, the most important operations were carried out in the Pays de Retz in the South Loire, where stretches of fertile land were useful for supplies.

The Germans seized Frossay in October and at the end of December, following heavy fighting, the village of La Sicaudais. They were opposed by the 2nd Battalion FFI who ceded a stretch of nearly 100 km^{2}. The front stabilized thanks to the intervention of the 8th Cuirassier Regiment

The Americans, for their part, dislodged the Germans from the Gâvre forest, forcing them to return to the other side of the Nantes to Brest canal and seized the town of Blain.

In February 1945, thanks to secret agents inside the pocket fortress, the Resistance warned the Allies of an imminent German attack near the Nantes-Brest canal.

During the month of March, American artillery managed to sink several cargo ships which had shuttled between the pocket fortresses of Lorient and Saint-Nazaire, thus increasing supply problems for the Germans.

In April, the Germans redoubled their aggression and constantly harassed the Allied positions with their artillery. On 19 April skirmishes occurred between three Franco-American patrols and the Germans causing three deaths and more than twenty wounded (and the loss of three tanks) on the Allied side and the loss of 33 men (dead or wounded) on the German side (by this time, on the Western front, Anglo-American troops had already largely invaded Germany and reached the Elbe).

A prominent researcher, Rémy Desquesnes estimates the overall losses on the Allied side at 500 killed, wounded or prisoners.

== Surrender ==
After the signing of the overall German surrender in Reims on 7 May 1945, the German command in Saint-Nazaire began negotiations with the French about the surrender of the city, seeking guarantees about the treatment of prisoners and threatening to sabotage the port if an agreement could not be not reached. The signing of the pocket surrender agreement took place in the house of Francis Moisan, at a place called "Les Sables" in Cordemais on 8 May 1945.

The fighting was supposed to end from 00:1 9 May 1945. The German command however refused to surrender the city to French troops. In the southern sector of the "pocket", hostilities continued until the morning of 11 May 1945. The final surrender ceremony took place at noon that day at the Grand Clos racecourse in Bouvron. During this ceremony, General Hans Junck handed his weapon to the American General Herman F. Kramer in the presence of General Chomel, the prefect of Loire-Inférieure, Alexandre Vincent, and French and American detachments. The German command did not give the order for the destruction of port facilities and the sinking of ships remaining in the harbour of Saint-Nazaire.

== Commemoration ==
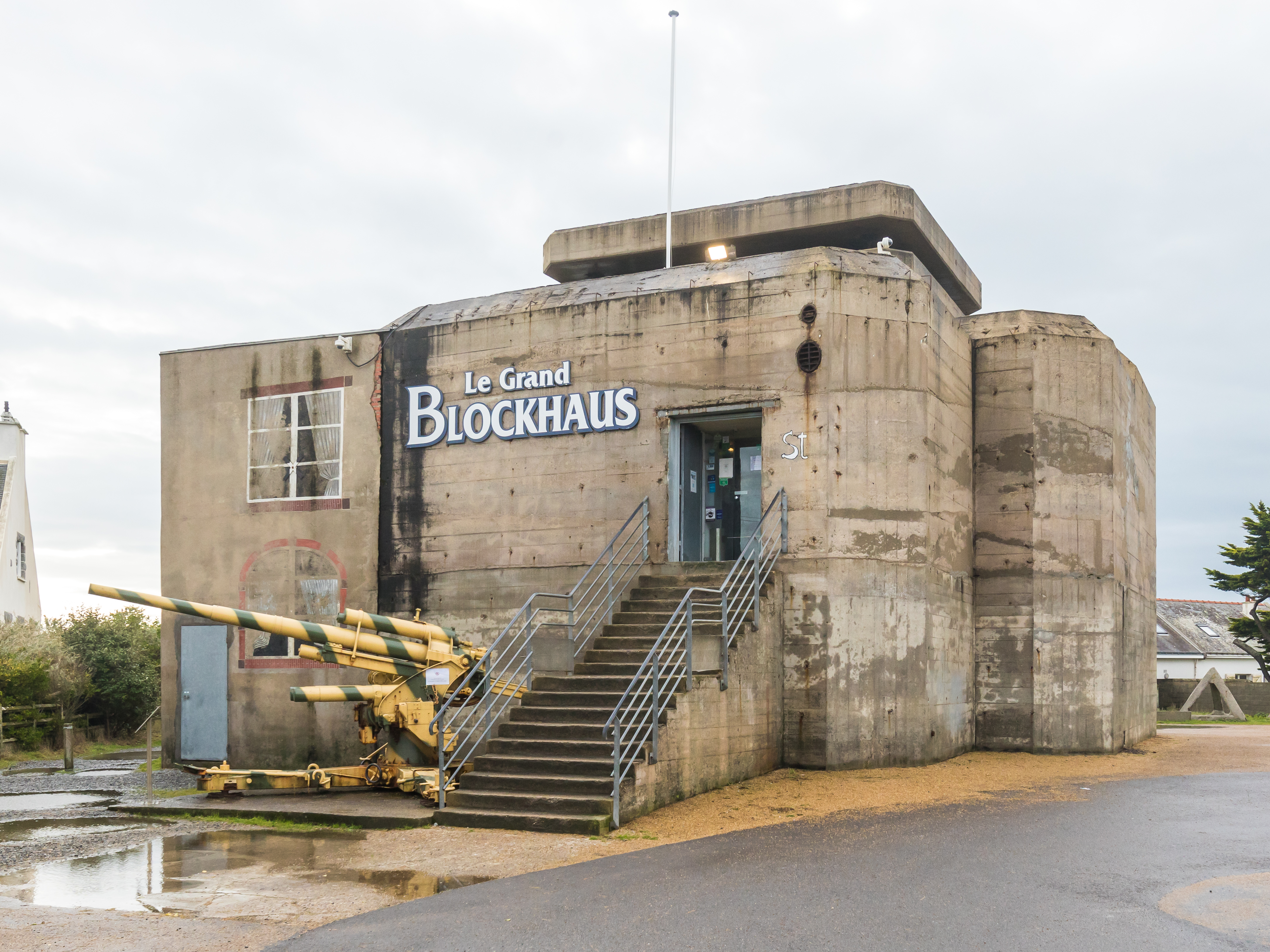

A monument in the shape of a Lorraine cross was erected in 1949 in Bouvron to commemorate the signing of the surrender.

The Grand Blockhaus of Batz-sur-Mer has housed the museum of the Saint-Nazaire pocket since opening in 1997. In 2019, the museum has collaborated on the production of The Fortress of Saint-Nazaire, the first documentary retracing the full history of the Saint-Nazaire Pocket.

== See also ==
- Liberation of France
- Battle for Brittany
- Battle of Brest
- Battle of Saint-Malo
- Pornichet German military cemetery

== Bibliography ==
- Bloyet, Dominique (1998), Saint-Nazaire. La Poche (in French), Montreuil-Bellay: Éditions CMD
- Braeuer, Luc (2003), L'incroyable histoire de la poche de Saint-Nazaire [The incredibe story of the Saint-Nazaire Pocket] (in French), Batz-Sur-Mer
- Desquesnes, Rémy (February 2011), Les poches de résistance allemandes sur le littoral français: août 1944 - mai 1945 [The pockets of German resistance on the French coast: August 1944 - May 1945] (in French), Rennes: Ouest-France, ISBN 978-2-7373-4685-9
- Ganz, A. Harding. "Questionable Objective: The Brittany Ports, 1944." Journal of Military History 59.1 (1995): 77–95.
- Gautier, Michel Alexandre (2015), Poche de Saint-Nazaire. Neuf mois d'une guerre oubliée [The Saint-Nazare Pocket. Nine months of a forgotten war] (in French), Geste éditions, pp. 1–424
- Noack, Stefan (2010), Die Belagerung der französischen Hafenstadt Saint Nazaire. Autobiografische und literarische Auseinandersetzungen der deutschen Nachkriegszeit [The siege of the French port city of Saint Nazaire. Autobiographical and literary discussions of the German post-war period] (Bachelor thesis) (in German), Free University of Berlin
- Pilven Le Sévellec, Janine; Pilven Le Sévellec, Yves (1995), Les délaissés de la Libération. La vie de tous les jours dans la poche de Saint-Nazaire [The neglected people of the Liberation. Everyday life in the Saint-Nazaire Pocket] (in French), Nantes: Ouest Éditions, ISBN 2-908261-44-8
- Rondel, Éric (2001), Lorient, Saint-Nazaire. Les poches de l'Atlantique [Lorient, Saint-Nazaire. The Atlantic pockets] (in French), Éditions Astoure, ISBN 2-84583-037-8
- Sicard, Daniel (2005), La Poche de Saint-Nazaire (in French), Nantes: Éditions Siloë
- Simonnet, Stéphane (2015), Les poches de l'Atlantique, Les batailles oubliées de la Libération Janvier 1944 - mai 1945 [The Pockets of the Atlantic. The forgotten battles of the Liberation January 1944 - May 1945] (in French), Tallandier, ISBN 979-10-210-0492-4
