= Robert C. Macon =

United States Army general

Robert Chauncey Macon
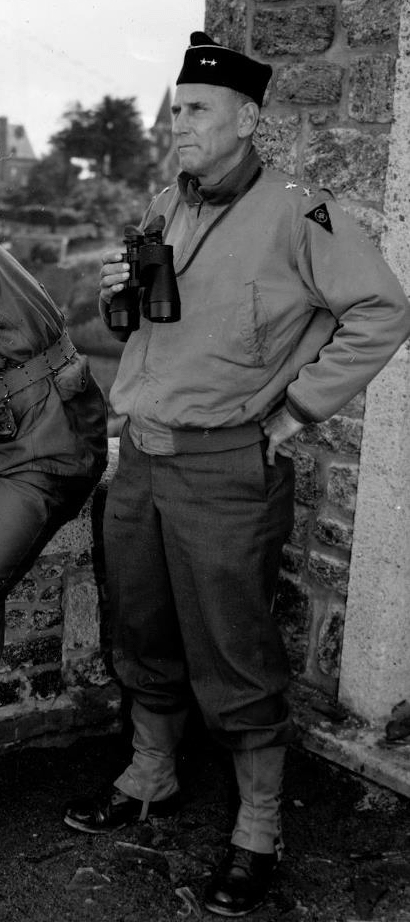
- Robert C. Macon in 1944
- Born: July 12, 1890; Washington, D.C., United States
- Died: October 20, 1980 (aged 90); Washington, D.C., United States
- Military career
- Allegiance: United States
- Branch: United States Army
- Service years: 1916–1952
- Rank: Major General
- Service number: 0-4733
- Unit: Infantry Branch
- Commands: 7th Infantry Regiment; 83rd Infantry Division
- Conflicts: World War I World War II
- Awards: Army Distinguished Service Medal; Silver Star; Legion of Merit; Bronze Star (2)

Major General Robert Chauncey Macon (July 12, 1890 – October 20, 1980) was a senior United States Army officer who commanded the 7th Infantry Regiment and the 83rd Infantry Division during World War II in Western Europe and later served as military attaché in Moscow.

== Early life ==
Macon graduated from Virginia Polytechnic Institute in 1912 with a B.S. degree and received an M.E. from the same institution the following year. He also played college football for the university. He was commissioned a Second Lieutenant of Infantry in 1916. He served in China as the commander of Company I, 15th Infantry Regiment from 1919 to 1921. He was then a professor of military science and tactics at Virginia Polytechnic Institute from 1924 to 1928. After graduation from the U.S. Army Command and General Staff School on June 19, 1931, he served in the Panama Canal Department until 1933. He then attended the U.S. Army War College and from 1934 to 1939 was an instructor at the U.S. Army Infantry School. Macon served as assistant chief of staff for plans in VII Corps from March to August 1940, and then served with the 6th Armored Infantry Regiment until 1941. He was then assigned as assistant chief of staff for supply of the 4th Armored Division.

== World War II ==
In April 1942, Macon, now a colonel, took command of the 7th Infantry Regiment, 3rd Infantry Division. He commanded the regiment during Operation Torch, the invasion of North Africa in November 1942, and the subsequent occupation of French Morocco. In February 1943, he was promoted to brigadier general.

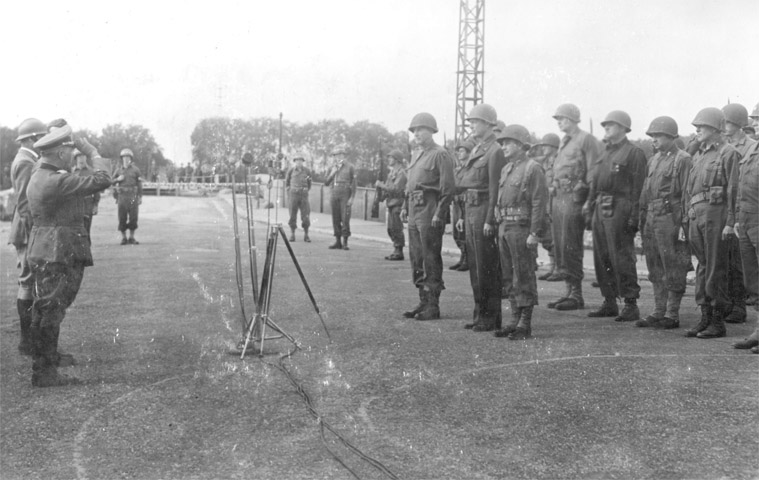
German General Botho Henning Elster surrenders himself and 20,000 troops to Major General Robert C. Macon of the U.S. Ninth Army and to Major General Otto P. Weyland, Commanding General of the XIX Tactical Air Command, September 16, 1944.

In April 1943, Brigadier General Macon was appointed as assistant division commander (ADC) of the 83rd Infantry Division. He succeeded Frank W. Milburn as commanding general of the division in January 1944 and was promoted to major general on June 1, 1944.

Major General Macon commanded the 83rd Infantry Division during operations in Normandy, including Operation Cobra and the Battle of Saint-Malo. The division then screened the Allied advance along the Loire River Valley, and accepted the surrender of 20,000 German troops at Beaugency. The division drove through Lorraine and into Luxembourg, and then fought in the Battle of the Bulge. Nicknamed "The Rag-Tag Circus" by war correspondents due to Macon ordering the supplementing of the division's transport with anything that moved, "no questions asked", the 83rd moved as fast as an armored task force, in an assortment of captured and hurriedly repainted (olive-green, with a U.S. star) German vehicles, expanding the mobile fleet with the surrender or capture of every enemy unit or town. The division advanced through Germany and linked up with Soviet troops on the Elbe River in April. Throughout this period, from the time he assumed command of the 83rd Infantry Division, his ADC was Brigadier General Claude Birkett Ferenbaugh.

== Later years ==
Major General Macon remained in command of the 83rd Infantry Division until 1946, when he became military attaché in the U.S. Embassy in Moscow, USSR. He served there from 1946 to 1948, and then became Deputy Chief, U.S. Army Field Forces, from 1949 to 1952. He retired in July 1952.

== Decorations ==

1st Row	Army Distinguished Service Medal			
2nd Row	Silver Star	Legion of Merit	Bronze Star Medal with Oak Leaf Cluster	World War I Victory Medal
3rd Row	American Defense Service Medal	American Campaign Medal	European-African-Middle Eastern Campaign Medal with six Service Stars	World War II Victory Medal
4th Row	Army of Occupation Medal	National Defense Service Medal	Officer of the French Order of the Legion of Honor	French Croix de guerre 1939–1945 with palm

== Promotions ==
Source: Register of the Army of the United States for 1946. United States Government Printing Office Washington: U.S. Secretary of War. 1946. p. 430

No pin insignia in 1915	Second Lieutenant of Infantry, Regular Army: November 30, 1916*
	First Lieutenant, Regular Army: November 30, 1916*
	Captain, Regular Army: August 3, 1917
	Major, Regular Army: December 13, 1928
	Lieutenant Colonel, Regular Army: October 1, 1938
	Colonel, Army of the United States: October 20, 1941
	Brigadier General, Army of the United States: February 2, 1943
	Major General, Army of the United States: June 1, 1944

Note - Macon accepted his commission December 1, 1916

== Sources ==
- R. Manning Ancell, Biographical Dictionary of World War II Generals and Flag Officers (1996)
- Shelby Stanton, World War II Order of Battle (1984)

Military offices
Preceded by Frank W. Milburn	Commanding General 83rd Infantry Division; 1944–1945	Succeeded by Post deactivated
