= 25th Motorized Division (France) =

WW2 French Army formation

The French 25th Motorized Division was a French Army division active during World War II.

== 25th Infantry Division (1873-1935) ==
In 1873, 25th Infantry Division was created, which participated in World War I.
In 1935, this division was transformed into the 25th Motorized Division.

== World War 2 ==
=== Battle Of France ===
During the Battle of France in May 1940 the division contained the following units:

- 38th Infantry Regiment
- 92nd Infantry Regiment
- 121st Infantry Regiment
- 5th Reconnaissance Battalion
- 16th Artillery Regiment
- 216th Artillery Regiment

The division was an active division which had existed during peacetime. It was a fully motorized Infantry Division. Led in May 1940 by General Jean-Baptiste Molinié, it was part of the defenders of the Lille Pocket from 26 to 31 May during the Battle of France, after which it surrendered.

=== 1945 ===
Towards the end of the Second World War, the French Forces of the Interior (FFI) from west-central France (notably those of the Charles Martel brigade, Indre-et-Loire, and Loire-Inférieure), were incorporated into the newly formed 25th Infantry Division, deployed in April 1945 in the Saint-Nazaire region. Equipped mainly with capture weapons, it was engaged against the German Saint-Nazaire pocket. Its commander was Raymond Chomel.
