= Hans Michahelles =

German admiral in WWII (1899–1975)

- Born: 18 May 1899
- Died: 14 June 1975 (aged 76)
- Military career
- Allegiance: Nazi Germany
- Branch: Kriegsmarine
- Rank: Konteradmiral
- Commands: Festungskommandant Girondemündung Nord
- Conflicts: World War II
- Awards: Knight's Cross of the Iron Cross

Hans Michahelles (18 May 1899 – 14 June 1975) was a German admiral during World War II. He was a recipient of the Knight's Cross of the Iron Cross of Nazi Germany.

== Awards ==
- Knight's Cross of the Iron Cross on 30 April 1945 as Konteradmiral and Festungskommandant Girondemündung Nord (Royan)
