= Joseph Rue =

Joseph Rue was a French vice-admiral during World War II. He led a fleet of 10 warships in the shelling of Royan in April 1945.

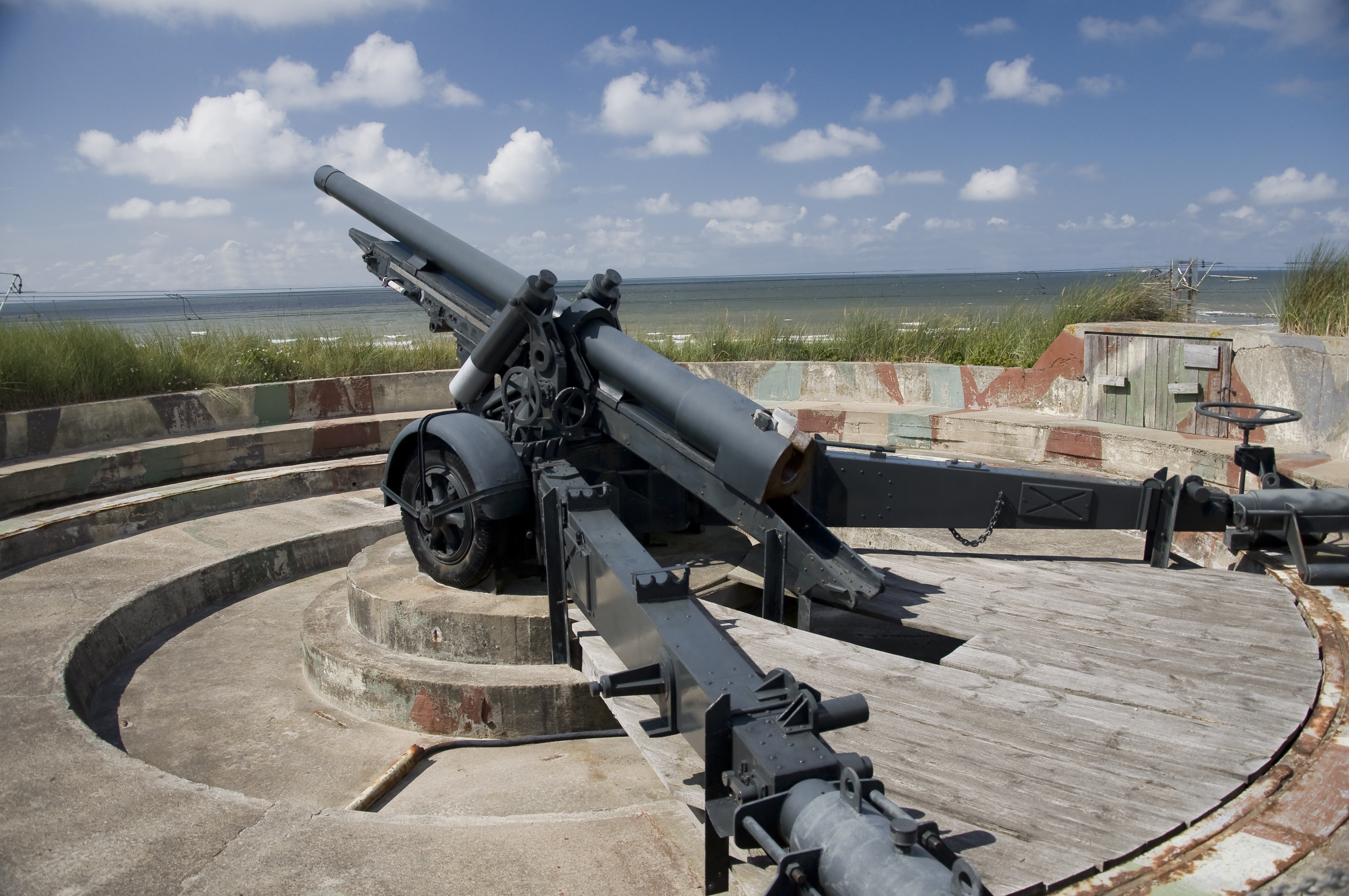
Openluchtmuseum Atlantikwall kanon 12 cm K 370 23-07-2010 16-04-07
