= Edgard de Larminat =

French general

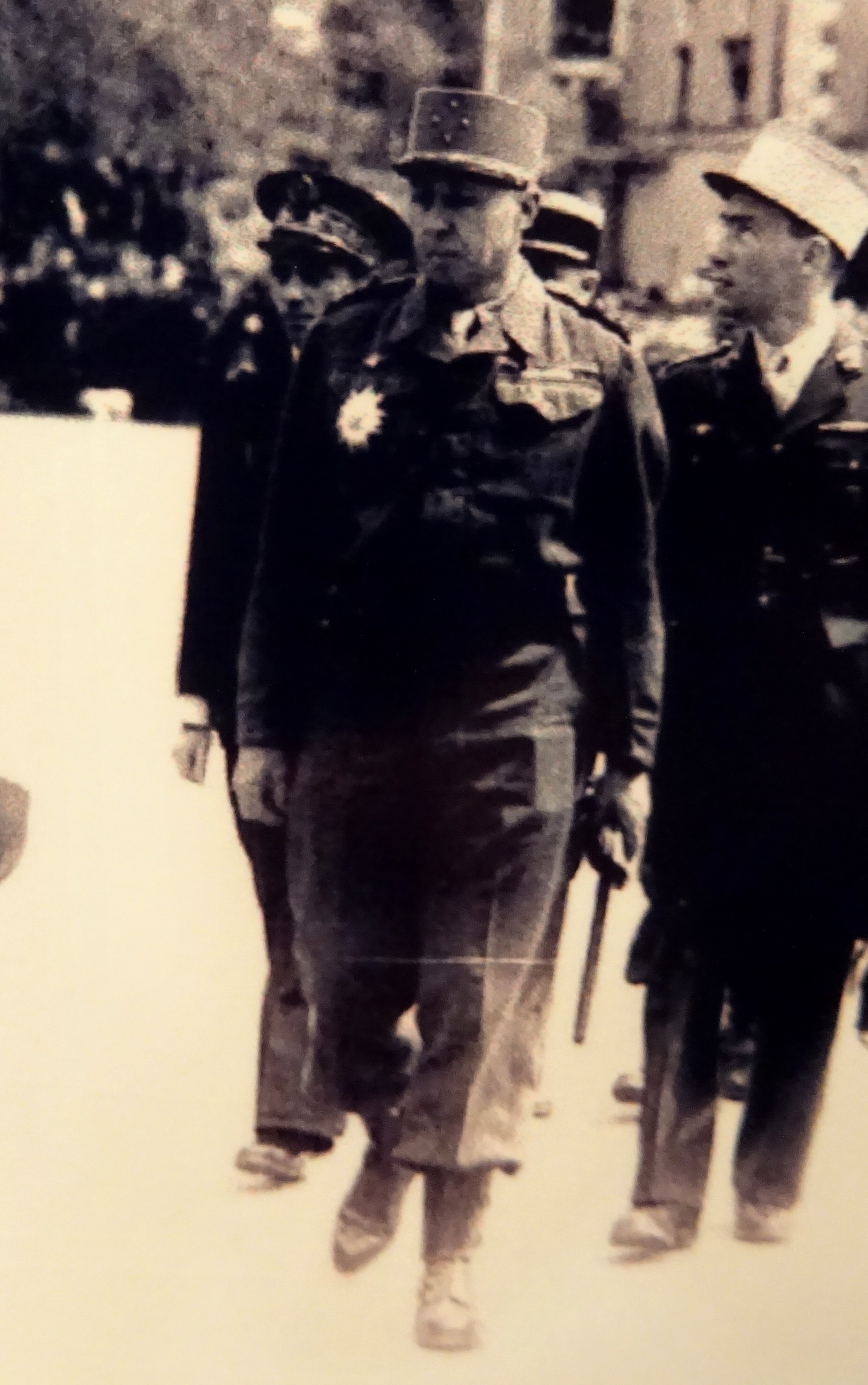
- Général de Larminat
- Born: 29 November 1895; Alès, France
- Died: 1 July 1962 (aged 66); Paris, France
- Cause of death: Suicide by gunshot
- Military career
- Allegiance: (France) French Army; Free French Forces
- Service years: 1914 – 1956; 1962(†)
- Rank: Army General (France)
- Commands: 1st DFL (1943); II Army Corps (1944); Atlantic Army Detachment (1945)
- Conflicts: World War I: Battle of Verdun (1917); World War II: North African Campaign; Italian Campaign; Dragoon; Siege of La Rochelle
- Awards: Commander of Legion of Merit, Croix de guerre 1914–1918, Croix de guerre 1939–1945, French Legion of Honor, Ordre de la Libération

Edgard de Larminat (29 November 1895 – 1 July 1962) was a French general, who fought in two World Wars. He was one of the most important military figures who joined the Free French forces under the British in 1940. He was awarded the Ordre de la Libération.

Larminat joined the French Army at the outbreak of the First World War as a private and by 1915 had completed his officer training and later fought at the Battle of Verdun. During the course of the war, Larminat was wounded three times and gassed once. He achieved the rank of captain by the close of the war.

Completing his military studies at Saint-Cyr in October 1919, Larminat volunteered to serve in the colonial infantry. In this capacity, he saw combat against rebels in Morocco, and later served in Mauritania and Indochina. At the outbreak of the Second World War, Larminat was a lieutenant-colonel stationed in the Levant.

Larminat was still serving in the Middle East when France surrendered in June, 1940. He refused to obey the French Government and was imprisoned in Damascus, but escaped and fled to join the renegade Free French group in Palestine. He was later active in Africa and during the Allied invasion of Italy and France, serving as the commander of the 1st Free French Division in north Africa, the Free French Pursuit Corps in Italy, and the Free French II Corps and Atlantic Army Detachment in France. De Larminat is held responsible for the controversial bombardment and destruction of the French city of Royan in January 1945.

After the war, Larminat served in several positions, notably as the Inspector-General of overseas troops and the inspector of colonial forces. He also served as the first president of the Association of the Free French. Larminat retired to the reserves in 1956 and was briefly recalled to active duty in 1962 to chair the Court of Military Justice charged with judging the actions of French officers who took part in the rebellion of colonial troops in Algeria in 1961. Before the court convened, Larminat committed suicide on 1 July 1962.

== Awards and decorations ==
=== France ===
- Ordre de la Libération – Decree of 1 August 1941
- Grand Cross of the Legion of Honour
- Croix de Guerre 1914-1918 (4 citations)
- Croix de Guerre 1939-1945 (4 citations)
- Croix de guerre des Théâtres d'opérations extérieures (1 citation)
- Croix du Combattant Volontaire
- Médaille de la Résistance with rosette
- Commander of the Ordre du Mérite combattant
- Colonial Medal with Clasp "Morocco"
- Médaille commémorative de la guerre 1914–1918
- Commemorative Medal for the Levant
- Médaille Interalliée 1914–1918
- Médaille des Évadés
- Medal for the Wounded

=== Foreign ===
- Commander of the Legion of Merit (USA)
- Order of the Bath (UK)
- Commander of the Order of Leopold (Belgium)
- Belgian Croix de Guerre 1914-1918 with Palm
- Grand Cross of the Virtuti Militari (Poland)
- Grand Cross of the Order of the Black Star (Benin)
- Grand Cross of the Order of the Dragon of Annam

== Works ==
- Que sera la France de demain, n.p. 1943
- L'Armée dans la Nation, Paris 1945
- Bertie Albrecht, Pierre Arrighi, General Brosset, D. Corticciato, Jean Prevost, 5 parmi d'autres, Paris 1947
- L'Armée européenne, Paris 1952
- Chroniques irrévérencieuses, Paris 1962
