= Pointe de Grave =

Point on the Médoc Peninsula, France

Coordinates: 45°34′10″N 1°3′50″W

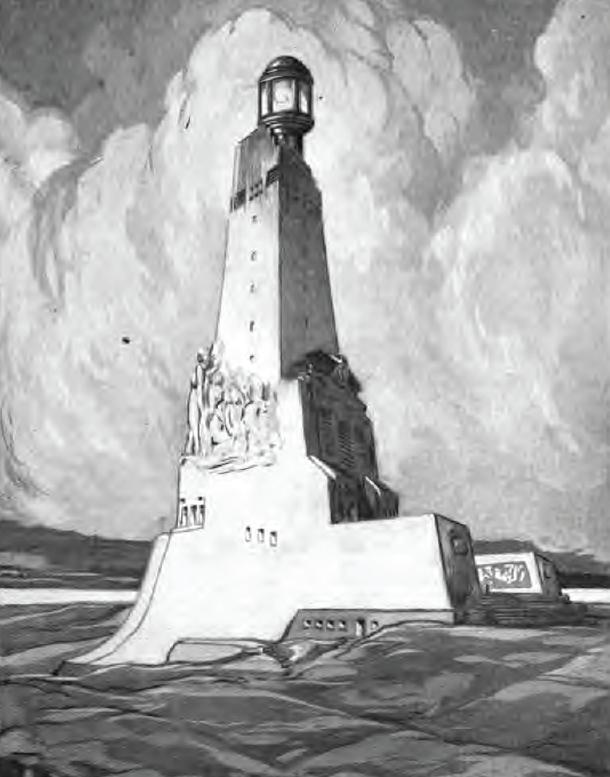
The American monument marking the country's entry into World War 1 as it was proposed in 1921.

The Pointe de Grave (in occitan: Punta de Grava) is the northernmost tip of the Médoc peninsula, and marks the Northern end of the pine-clad sandy Landes coastline of Western France. It lies in the commune of Le Verdon-sur-Mer and across the Gironde estuary from the resort town of Royan.

The offshore Cordouan Lighthouse lies off the point, and a second lighthouse, on the shore, houses a lighthouse museum.

== History ==
During the First World War, United States troops first landed here. A monument marked the place, but it was destroyed by the Germans during their occupation of France on 30 May 1942.

It is of strategic significance, owing to its position at the mouth of the Gironde estuary and was the site of a German fortress during the Second World War, built to guard the entrance to that estuary. In April 1945, US Eighth Air Force B-24s of the 467th Bombardment Group set a new record for precision bombing and destroyed a German battery.

The old blockhouse provides panoramic views of the Atlantic Ocean, the Cordouan Lighthouse, the Gironde estuary, Royan, the La Coubre Lighthouse, further up the coast from Royan and the Médoc peninsula itself.

== Sources ==
- Asher, Gerald (2 August 2011). A Vineyard in My Glass. University of California Press. ISBN 978-0-520-27033-6.
- Cumberlidge, Peter (18 November 2022). Cruising West France: A Yachting Companion. Imray, Laurie, Norie and Wilson Ltd. ISBN 978-1-78679-466-6.
- DK (1 October 2010). The Wine Opus: A 21st-Century Reference to more than 4,000 of the World's Greatest Wineries and their Wines. Dorling Kindersley Limited. ISBN 978-1-4053-6634-2.
- Hearst Magazines (1923). Popular Mechanics. Hearst Magazines.
- McClellan, Edwin North (2014). The United States Marine Corps in the World War. U.S. Marine Corps History Division. ISBN 978-0-16-092782-9.
- United States Hydrographic Office (1926). Bay of Biscay Pilot: West Coast of France and the North Coast of Spain from Ile D'Ouessant to Cabo Toriñana. U.S. Government Printing Office.
- Whitehead, Jonathan (30 September 2021). Spanish Republicans and the Second World War: Republic Across the Mountains. Pen and Sword History. ISBN 978-1-3990-0454-1.
