= 66th Infantry Division (United States) =

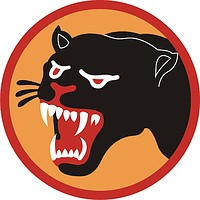
- 66th Infantry Division shoulder sleeve insignia
- Active: 16 December 1942–8 November 1945
- Country: United States
- Branch: United States Army
- Type: Infantry
- Size: Division
- Nickname: "Black Panther Division"
- Engagements: World War II; Northern France

Commanders
- April 1943 -August 1945: Maj. Gen. Herman F. Kramer
- August 1945 – November 1945: Maj. Gen. Walter E. Lauer

Insignia
- Identification symbol: Red bordered circle, containing black panther's head against an orange background

The 66th Infantry Division was a unit of the United States Army during World War II. Activated 15 April 1943, the division trained at Camp Blanding, Florida, and was later transferred to Camp Robinson, Arkansas and then later to Camp Rucker, Alabama before being shipped overseas to England on 26 November 1944. Commanded by Maj. Gen. Herman F. Kramer, the 66th Infantry Division's main role in World War II was containing and eliminating the remaining pockets of German soldiers in Northern France.

== History ==
=== World War II ===
==== Division organization ====
The 66th Infantry Division was activated in the Army of the United States on 16 December 1942 and consisted of the following units.

66th Infantry Division organization (click to enlarge)

- 66th Infantry Division
  - 66th Infantry Division Headquarters
  - 66th Cavalry Reconnaissance Troop (Mechanized) (M3 scout cars and then M8 Greyhound armored cars)
  - 262nd Infantry Regiment
    - Headquarters and Headquarters Company
    - 3× Infantry battalions
      - each battalion consists of: 1× Headquarters and Headquarters Company, 3× Rifle companies, 1× Heavy Weapons Company
    - Cannon Company (T12 Gun Motor Carriages and T19 Howitzer Motor Carriages, later replaced by either M3 105mm towed howitzers or M7 Priest self propelled howitzers)
    - Anti-Tank Company (M3 37mm anti-tank guns, which were replaced by 1944 with M1 57mm anti-tank guns)
    - Service Company
  - 263rd Infantry Regiment
    - same organization as 262nd Infantry Regiment
  - 264th Infantry Regiment
    - same organization as 262nd Infantry Regiment
  - 66th Infantry Division Artillery
    - Headquarters and Headquarters Battery
    - 721st Field Artillery Battalion
      - Headquarters and Headquarters Battery
      - 3× Batteries (M1 155mm towed howitzers)
      - Service Battery
    - 870th Field Artillery Battalion
      - Headquarters and Headquarters Battery
      - 3× Batteries (M2 105mm towed howitzers)
      - Service Battery
    - 871st Field Artillery Battalion
      - same organization as 870th Field Artillery Battalion
    - 872d Field Artillery Battalion
      - same organization as 870th Field Artillery Battalion
  - Headquarters Special Troops
    - Headquarters Company, 66th Infantry Division
    - 566th Signal Company
    - 66th Quartermaster Company
    - 766th Ordnance Light Maintenance Company
    - Military Police Platoon
    - 66th Infantry Division Band (attached)
  - 266th Engineer Combat Battalion
    - Headquarters and Headquarters and Service Company
    - 3× Engineer combat companies
  - 366th Medical Battalion
    - Headquarters and Headquarters Detachment
    - 3× Collecting companies
    - Clearing Company

The 422nd Infantry Regiment and 423rd Infantry Regiment of the 106th Infantry Division) were attached to the division from 15 April to 15 May 1945.

==== Combat chronicle ====
Three regiments of the 66th Infantry Division arrived in Dorchester, England on 26 November 1944, and the rest of the Division joined them on 12 December 1944. They trained and prepared for deployment until 24 December 1944, then transferred to Southampton before crossing the English Channel to Cherbourg, France. Two transport vessels, SS Cheshire and the Belgian Leopoldville carried the 66th across the English Channel. However, only 5 miles from the port of Cherbourg, the Leopoldville was torpedoed by a German U-Boat and sunk, taking the lives of 14 officers and 748 enlisted soldiers. The U.S. Navy later announced the sinking of the Leopoldville to be the second-largest loss of life from the sinking of a troop transport ship in the entire European Theater.

Primarily involved with destroying the German troops left behind in port cities in western France such as Lorient, St. Nazaire, Royan and La Rochelle following the retreat during the summer of 1944, the 66th Infantry Division relieved the 94th Infantry Division of control of the Brittany-Loire area on 29 December 1944, and collaborated with French forces as well. The 66th carried out its objective by harassing German installations, conducting limited objective attacks, and running reconnaissance missions to gather intelligence. The use of artillery shelling many German positions also played a major part in the advancement of the 66th through the region. Notably, a heavy German attack near La Croix was repulsed on 16 April 1945 and several strongly fortified enemy positions were taken from 19 to 29 April 1945 in a series of counterattacks. The remaining German soldiers surrendered to 66th Infantry Division officers and French officials in a small cafe near Cordemais on 8 May 1945.

Ordered to change to an occupation-oriented mission on 14 May 1945, the 66th made a 700-mile trek into Germany where the Black Panthers occupied 2,400 square miles of territory and the city of Koblenz. As a security force, the division was charged with establishment of a military government and control of all German affairs. Tasks included the discharge of prisoners of war, inventorying of ammunition and supplies, and organizing civilians. After spending time in Germany, the 66th returned to the French coast to aid with the allied withdrawal from the European Theater. During this time, the composition of the division was changed by the beginning of the inactivation process, until it returned to the U.S. and was formally inactivated, sailing for home 27 October 1945.

==== Assignments in European Theater of Operations ====
- 27 December 1944: 12th Army Group.
- 31 March 1945: Fifteenth Army, 12th Army Group.

==== Casualties ====
- Total battle casualties: 1,452
- Killed in action: 795 (Includes SS Léopoldville disaster)
- Wounded in action: 636
- Prisoner of war: 21

== Division insignia ==
- Nickname: Black Panther Division
- Shoulder sleeve insignia: The snarling panther suggests the power, aggressiveness and endurance of the Division. The shoulder sleeve insignia was approved on 26 August 1943

The shoulder sleeve insignia was designed by Nicolas Viscardi (known professionally as Nick Cardy), a comic book artist who served in the Division during World War II. Viscardi won a competition to design the patch, and subsequently created the iconic logo. Viscardi also earned two Purple Hearts for wounds suffered as a tank driver while serving with the 3rd Armored Division.
