= XXV Army Corps (Wehrmacht) =

German Army corps based in France during WW2

The XXV Army Corps (German: XXV. Armeekorps) was an army corps of Germany's Wehrmacht during World War II.

== History ==
=== Formation ===
The XXV Army Corps was established as a reserve command staff in the Upper Rhine border region in 1938. This staff was mobilized as Generalkommando Oberrhein on 26 August 1939 and renamed XXV Army Corps on 17 September 1939. It was initially part of the 7th Army (Dollmann) under Army Group C (von Leeb), tasked with guarding the Franco-German border. The division remained in the Upper Rhine area until the Battle of France in June 1940.

=== Occupation duty in France, 1940 – 1944 ===
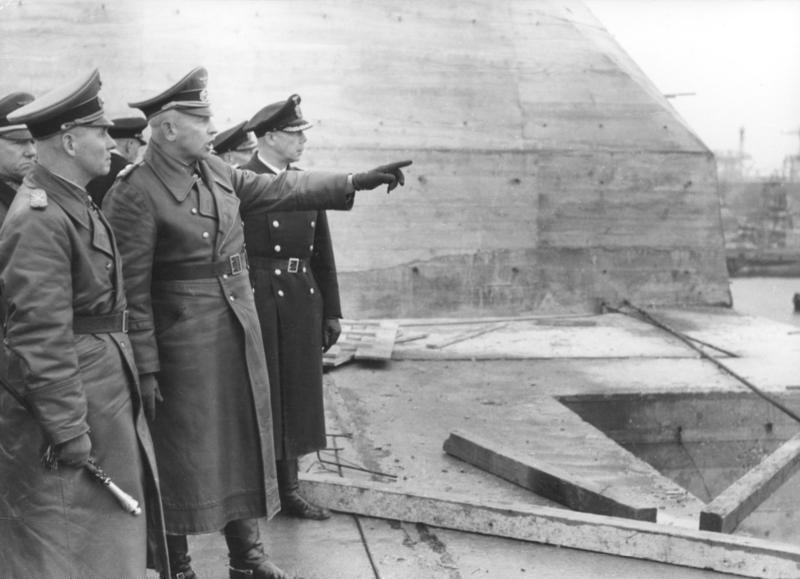
18 February 1944: Wilhelm Fahrmbacher (middle), commander of XXV Corps, next to Erwin Rommel (left), commander of Army Group B, in Saint-Nazaire.

After the Battle of France, the XXV Army Corps became part of the German occupation force in France. It served briefly under the 12th Army (Wilhelm List) between May and June 1940. Subsequently, the XXV Army Corps served a three-month tenure under the guidance of the 1st Army between September and November 1940. Under both the 12th and 1st Armies, the XXV Army Corps was on occupation duty in Eastern France. On the rearend of that service, the corps switched from Army Group C to Army Group D (Erwin von Witzleben, the OB West). Under Army Group D, the XXV Army Corps was reassigned to the 6th Army (von Reichenau), where it remained between December 1940 and April 1941. Under the 6th Army, the XXV Army Corps was redeployed from eastern France to the country's northwest.

In May 1941, the XXV Army Corps returned to the control of its initial superior formation, the 7th Army (Dollmann). It would remain under the 7th Army until July 1944. The corps was moved to the Brittany region. The corps headquarters were at Pontivy.

On 24 April 1943, divisions under its command included the 94th Infantry Division at Quimperlé and the 76th Infantry Division at Redon.

On 30 October 1943, Wilhelm Fahrmbacher received the German Cross in Silver for his service as the commander of XXV Army Corps.

On 3 June 1944, just before the Allied invasion, the corps, still at Pontivy, oversaw the 275th Infantry Division at Redon, the 265th Infantry Division at Quimperlé, the 2nd Parachute Division at Quintin and the 343rd Infantry Division at Landerneau. On the northern cost of Brittany, the LXXIV Army Corps at Guingamp secured the XXV Army Corps' right.

=== Western Front, 1944 – 1945 ===
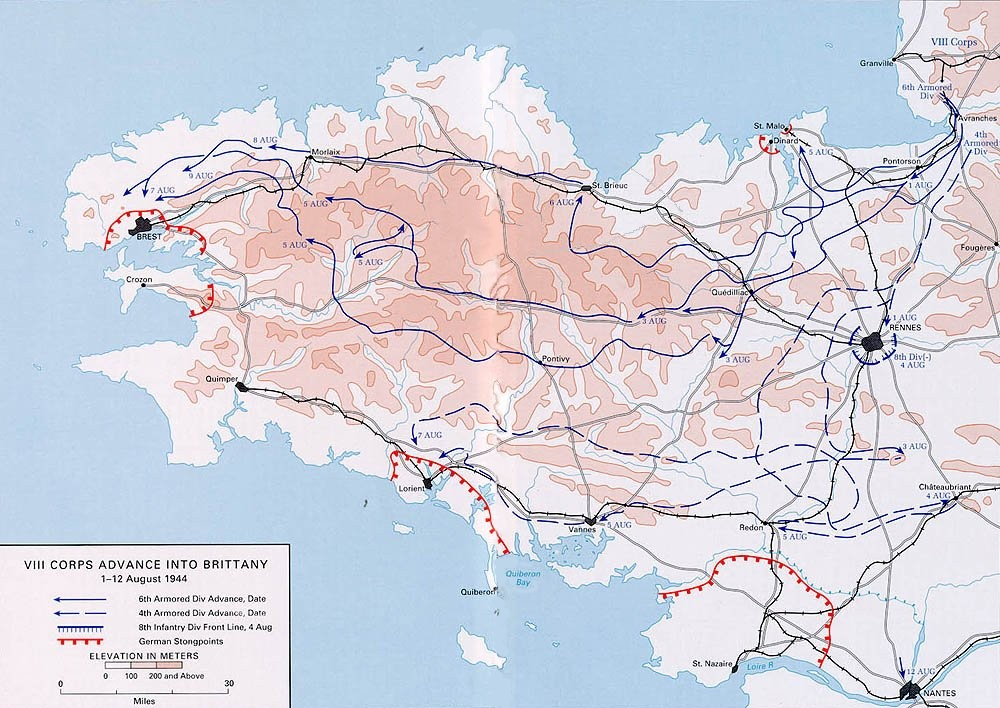
U.S. advance into Brittany, 1 – 12 August 1944

The Allied Normandy landings on 6 June 1944 re-opened the Western Front. The Allied attacks at the beaches Gold, Sword, Omaha, Utah and Juno in Normandy (Operation Neptune) attacked the positions of LXXXIV Army Corps, which stood to the right of LXXIV Army Corps, which was in turn the right neighbor of XXV Army Corps.

The units of the XXV Army Corps were pushed into the Atlantic pockets at Brest, Lorient and Saint-Nazaire in August 1944 as a result of the Allied breakthrough from southwestern Normandy into Brittany (Operation Cobra). Beginning on 1 August 1944, the newly formed Twelfth U.S. Army Group pushed from Pontaubault into Brittany. In total, the American force that pushed through the far end of the Allied right flank included four armored and eight infantry divisions. The Allied forces reached Rennes at 1 August, Saint-Malo on 5 August and Brest on 6 August. Furthermore, a southward push by the 4th U.S. Armored Division from Rennes towards Saint-Nazaire and Nantes began on 3 August with the goal of cutting Brittany off any Axis reinforcements. The CCA of 4th Armored Division would take Nantes on 12 August. The XXV Army Corps had quickly retreated its forces into an area around Lorient, starting south of Pont-Scorff and reaching southeast all the wait to Quiberon Bay, including the Quiberon peninsula. Here, the CCB of 4th Armored Division makes first contact with the defenses of the XXV Army Corps on 7 August 1945 at 09:00. Subsequently, the American siege units were content with allowing most of the German garrisons to remain in their pockets; only Brest and Saint-Malo fell under heavy immediate attack. US Army units completed the liberation of Saint-Malo on 18 August 1944.

The forces of the 2nd Parachute Division, 266th Infantry Division and 343rd Infantry Division, constituting most of the remains of the XXV Army Corps, were trapped in Brest, where they were defeated until 19 September 1944 in the Battle for Brest.

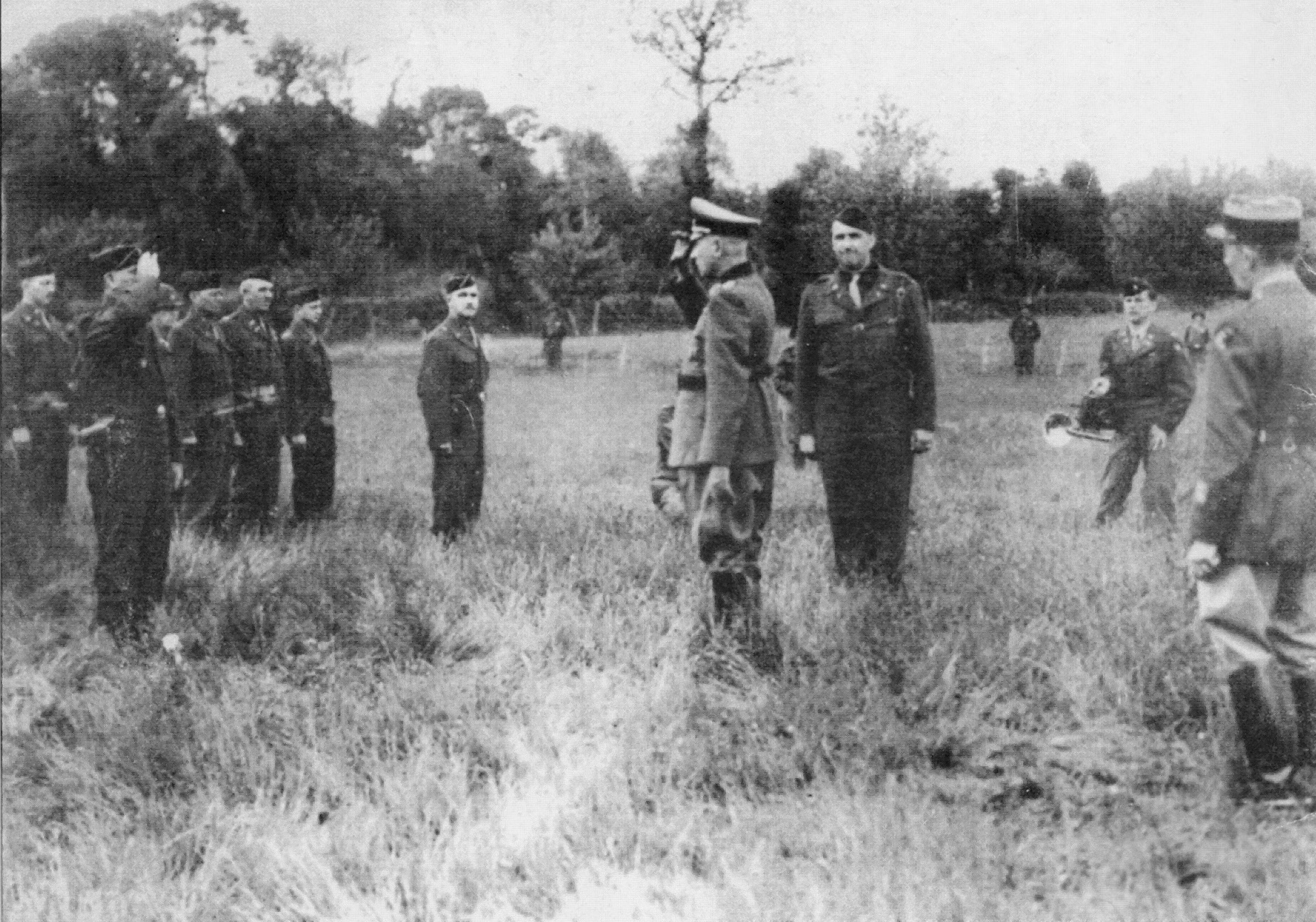
10 May 1945: General Fahrmbacher, commander of XXV Army Corps, surrenders at Lorient.

The Lorient fortress held out against the Allied siege until after the German surrender on 8 May 1945. The commander of XXV Army Corps Wilhelm Fahrmbacher surrendered the fortress on 10 May 1945.

== Commanders ==
- Alfred Wäger, corps commander from August 1939 to November 1939.
- Karl Ritter von Prager, corps commander from November 1939 to May 1942.
- Wilhelm Fahrmbacher, corps commander from May 1942 to June 1944 and again from June 1944 until surrender.
- Dietrich von Choltitz, corps commander in June 1944. Later instrumental in the Liberation of Paris.

== Organizational chart ==
Organizational chart of the XXV Army Corps
Year	Date	Subordinate Divisions	Army	Army Group	Operational Area
1939	26 August	None	7th Army	Army Group C	Upper Rhine
1939	16 October	260th Infantry, 14th Landwehr, 78th Infantry, 215th Infantry	7th Army	Army Group C	Upper Rhine
1939	4 December	260th Infantry, 14th Landwehr, 95th Infantry, 96th Infantry	7th Army	Army Group C	Upper Rhine
1940	17 January	260th Infantry, 205th Infantry, 212th Infantry, 246th Infantry	7th Army	Army Group C	Upper Rhine
1940	10 May	555th Infantry, 557th Infantry	7th Army	Army Group C	Upper Rhine
1940	9 June	555th Infantry, 557th Infantry	7th Army	Army Group C	Upper Rhine
1940	21 July	260th Infantry, 23rd Infantry	12th Army	Army Group C	Eastern France
1940	1 August	215th Infantry, 73rd Infantry	12th Army	Army Group C	Eastern France
1940	13 September	Großdeutschland, 73rd Infantry, 1st SS Panzer, 169th Infantry, 167th Infantry	1st Army	Army Group C	Eastern France
1940	7 October	Großdeutschland, 73rd Infantry, 1st SS Panzer, 169th Infantry, 167th Infantry	1st Army	Army Group C	Eastern France
1940	November	Großdeutschland, 73rd Infantry, 1st SS Panzer, 169th Infantry, 167th Infantry	1st Army	Army Group D	Eastern France
1940	12 December	290th Infantry, 211th Infantry, 61st Infantry	6th Army	Army Group D	Northwestern France
1941	15 January	290th Infantry, 211th Infantry, 61st Infantry	6th Army	Army Group D	Northwestern France
1941	10 February	290th Infantry, 211th Infantry	6th Army	Army Group D	Northwestern France
1941	12 March	205th Infantry, 211th Infantry	6th Army	Army Group D	Northwestern France
1941	5 April	205th Infantry, 211th Infantry	6th Army	Army Group D	Northwestern France
1941	1 May	212th Infantry, 205th Infantry, 211th Infantry, 83rd Infantry	7th Army	Army Group D	Brittany
1941	5 June	709th Infantry, 332nd Infantry, 205th Infantry, 211th Infantry	7th Army	Army Group D	Brittany
1941	1 July	712th Infantry, 205th Infantry, 211th Infantry, 709th Infantry	7th Army	Army Group D	Brittany
1941	7 August	712th Infantry, 205th Infantry, 211th Infantry, 709th Infantry	7th Army	Army Group D	Brittany
1941	3 September	712th Infantry, 205th Infantry, 211th Infantry, 709th Infantry	7th Army	Army Group D	Brittany
1941	2 October	205th Infantry, 211th Infantry, 709th Infantry	7th Army	Army Group D	Brittany
1941	4 November	205th Infantry, 211th Infantry, 709th Infantry	7th Army	Army Group D	Brittany
1941	4 December	327th Infantry, 205th Infantry, 211th Infantry, 709th Infantry	7th Army	Army Group D	Brittany
1942	2 January	205th Infantry, 211th Infantry, 335th Infantry, 709th Infantry	7th Army	Army Group D	Brittany
1942	6 February	332nd Infantry, 305th Infantry, 335th Infantry, 709th Infantry	7th Army	Army Group D	Brittany
1942	10 March	332nd Infantry, 305th Infantry, 335th Infantry, 709th Infantry	7th Army	Army Group D	Brittany
1942	5 April	336th Infantry, 333rd Infantry, 305th Infantry, 335th Infantry, 709th Infantry	7th Army	Army Group D	Brittany
1942	11 May	336th Infantry, 333rd Infantry, 335th Infantry, 709th Infantry	7th Army	Army Group D	Brittany
1942	8 June	1st Parachute Panzer, 333rd Infantry, Panzerbrigade 100, 17th Infantry, 335th Infantry, 709th Infantry	7th Army	Army Group D	Brittany
1942	4 July	333rd Infantry, 17th Infantry, 335th Infantry, 709th Infantry	7th Army	Army Group D	Brittany
1942	5 August	337th Infantry, 333rd Infantry, 17th Infantry, 335th Infantry, 709th Infantry	7th Army	Army Group D	Brittany
1942	2 September	6th Panzer, 1st Parachute Panzer, 709th Infantry, 337th Infantry, 335th Infantry, 333rd Infantry, 182nd Infantry, 17th Infantry	7th Army	Army Group D	Brittany
1942	8 October	6th Panzer, 1st Parachute Panzer, 337th Infantry, 333rd Infantry, 182nd Infantry, 17th Infantry, 257th Infantry, 335th Infantry, 709th Infantry	7th Army	Army Group D	Brittany
1942	5 November	346th Infantry, 161st Infantry, 343rd Infantry, 333rd Infantry, 182nd Infantry, 17th Infantry, 257th Infantry, 335th Infantry, 709th Infantry	7th Army	Army Group D	Brittany
1942	1 December	257th Infantry, 333rd Infantry, 17th Infantry	7th Army	Army Group D	Brittany
1943	1 January	257th Infantry, 333rd Infantry, 17th Infantry, 38th Infantry	7th Army	Army Group D	Brittany
1943	3 February	257th Infantry, 17th LFD, 17th Infantry, 38th Infantry	7th Army	Army Group D	Brittany
1943	4 March	17th Infantry, 38th Infantry, 257th Infantry	7th Army	Army Group D	Brittany
1943	9 April	94th Infantry	7th Army	Army Group D	Brittany
1943	1 May	76th Infantry, 94th Infantry, 113th Infantry	7th Army	Army Group D	Brittany
1943	1 June	76th Infantry	7th Army	Army Group D	Brittany
1943	7 July	384th Infantry	7th Army	Army Group D	Brittany
1943	5 August	38th Infantry, 265th Infantry, 343rd Infantry	7th Army	Army Group D	Brittany
1943	5 September	384th Infantry, 265th Infantry, 343rd Infantry	7th Army	Army Group D	Brittany
1943	4 October	243rd Infantry, 265th Infantry, 343rd Infantry	7th Army	Army Group D	Brittany
1943	8 November	243rd Infantry, 265th Infantry, 343rd Infantry	7th Army	Army Group D	Brittany
1943	3 December	243rd Infantry, 265th Infantry, 343rd Infantry	7th Army	Army Group D	Brittany
1944	1 January	243rd Infantry, 265th Infantry, 343rd Infantry	7th Army	Army Group D	Brittany
1944	12 February	275th Infantry, 265th Infantry, 343rd Infantry	7th Army	Army Group D	Brittany
1944	11 March	275th Infantry, 265th Infantry, 343rd Infantry, 353rd Infantry	7th Army	Army Group D	Brittany
1944	15 April	275th Infantry, 265th Infantry, 343rd Infantry, 353rd Infantry	7th Army	Army Group D	Brittany
1944	15 May	275th Infantry, 265th Infantry, 343rd Infantry, 353rd Infantry	7th Army	Army Group B	Brittany
1944	12 June	2nd Parachute, 275th Infantry, 265th Infantry, 343rd Infantry	7th Army	Army Group B	Brittany
1944	17 July	265th Infantry, 343rd Infantry	7th Army	Army Group B	Brittany
1944	August – October	Trapped in Brest (until 19 September 1944): 2nd Parachute, 266th Infantry, 343rd Infantry Trapped in Lorient: 265th Infantry Trapped in Saint-Nazaire: Various contingents	Directly under OKW		Multiple Atlantic pockets
1944	November – December	Trapped in Lorient: 265th Infantry Trapped in Saint-Nazaire: Various contingents	Directly under OKW		Multiple Atlantic pockets
1945	January – April	Trapped in Lorient: 265th Infantry Trapped in Saint-Nazaire: Various contingents	Directly under OKW		Multiple Atlantic pockets
