= Brittany campaign =

Brittany campaign may refer to:

- Brittany campaign (1590–1598), during the French Wars of Religion
- Battle for Brittany (1944), during World War II

== See also ==
- Breton War
