= Battle for Brittany =

1944 Allied campaign during World War II

- Part of the Western Front of World War II
Date	August – September 1944
Location	North-western France
Result	Inconclusive

Belligerents
Allies; United States; Free France	Axis; Germany

Commanders and leaders
(United States) Troy H. Middleton; (United States) Walton Walker; (Free France) Raymond Chomel; (Free France) Albert Eon	(Nazi Germany) Wilhelm Fahrmbacher; (Nazi Germany) Andreas von Aulock; (Nazi Germany) Werner Junck; (Nazi Germany) Hans Mirow

The Battle for Brittany took place between August and October 1944. After the Allied Normandy breakout in June 1944, Brittany was attacked for its well developed ports which the Allies intended to use, whilst also stopping their continued use by German U-boats.

== Campaign rationale ==
The main objective of this battle was to secure Breton ports which could prove useful to the Allies to land more supplies. The secondary objective of this battle was to end the use of Breton ports for U-boat operations.

== Allied campaign strength ==
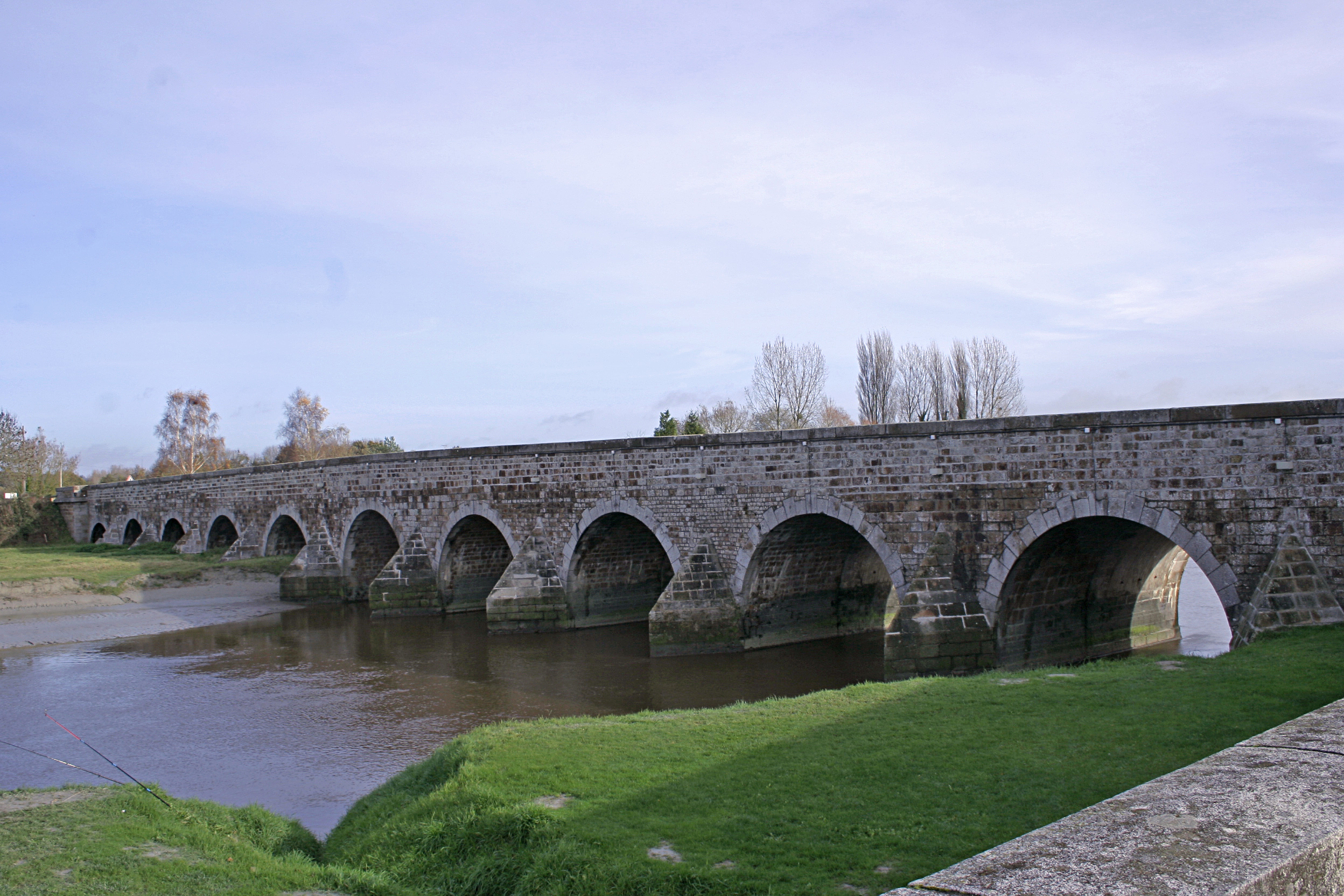
VIII Corps crossed the Pontaubault bridge on August 1, 1944, into Brittany following the success of Operation Cobra

- The US VIII Corps, was tasked to move east to west across the north of Brittany with Brest as their first target.
- At the same time, XX Corps, moved south to the city of Nantes, with both intending to meet at Lorient.

Once liberated, the Allies planned to build a harbour at Quiberon. One of the first objectives in Brittany, was the bridge at Pontaubault across the River Sélune. The Americans apparently quickly started experiencing communication difficulties with their rear command HQs, due to their rapid advance into northern Brittany, leading to difficulties in supplying units that were on the move.

=== Resistance involvement ===
The advance of VIII Corps also brought an additional problem relating to the local resistance. The campaign in Brittany intended the French Resistance to openly fight the Germans. A French Forces of the Interior (FFI) officer based in London, Albert Eon, was flown in to lead an estimated 20,000 local fighters. Equipment was parachuted to the resistance but due to the rapid American advance, these weapons frequently landed in areas already captured forcing it to be moved up to them. The FFI captured Vannes airfield using armoured jeeps brought in by gliders and took the rail bridges near Morlaix. Groups of FFI accompanied the Americans, where their local knowledge was used.

=== Pockets attacked ===
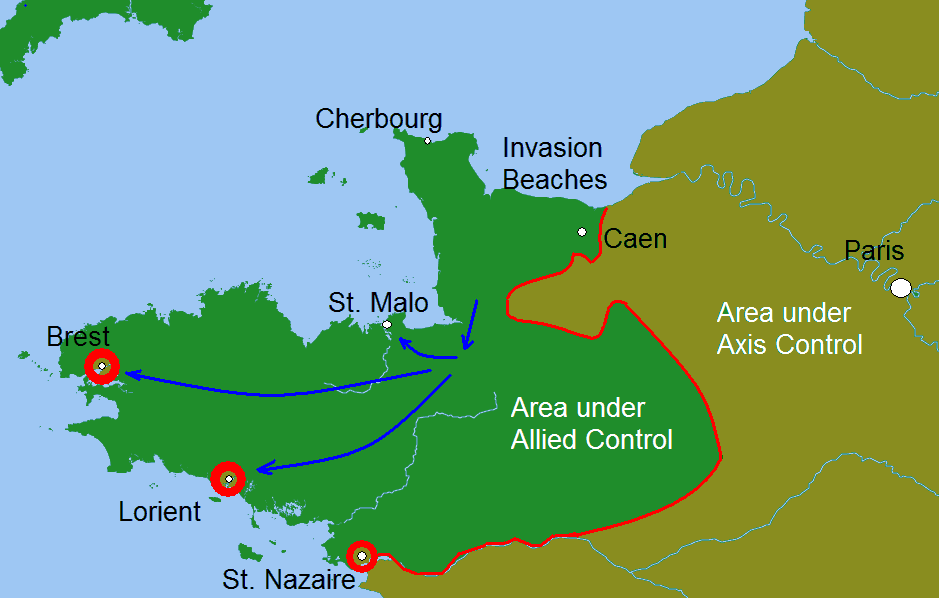
Brittany, NW France by mid-August 1944. The blue arrows represent the Allied approach routes to Breton ports

One assumed reason for the rapid advance of the Americans was that the Germans had moved most of their forces back to the fortified ports, resulting in fewer troops in the interior than expected. These ports had been designated as fortresses to allow for their use by the Germans, to deny them to the Allies and finally if necessary to destroy and prevent them from ever being useful to the Allies. By the time XX Corps arrived in Nantes on August 6, its port facilities was in ruins. That day, the Americans arrived at the outskirts of Brest, where fighting began and the city finally falling on September 18. Similar problems were experienced at the pocket of St. Malo, where intelligence from the Resistance indicated a force of 10,000 Germans. The Americans encountered fierce opposition but they gradually advanced to the citadel, where the defences were impervious to 1,000 lb (450 kg) bombs. The Americans prepared to use napalm when the Germans finally surrendered. The Americans with the FFI faced a similar doggedness at the Brest pocket. Over 75 strong points in the city were attacked, but this proved to be slow-going and time-consuming. By the time of the German surrender on September 18, the Americans had suffered 10,000 killed and wounded, whilst Brest was destroyed.

==== Stalemate ====
Rather than risk the same at the Lorient and St. Nazaire pockets, the Americans surrounded these ports for the rest of the war, keeping the Germans isolated. Their surrender came at the end of the war. By that time, the need for these port facilities in Brittany had become redundant when the Port of Antwerp was captured.

== Analysis ==
This decision to use two armored divisions for the battle of Brittany has been criticised in hindsight, as they could have been used far more profitably in the rapid Allied advance eastward across France. After so much effort, German sabotage proved so effective that the liberated Breton ports were unusable for the remainder of the war.

== Operations ==
- Battle for Brest
- Saint-Nazaire pocket
- Battle of Saint-Malo
- Liberation of Rennes
