= 343rd Division =

343rd Division may refer to:

- 343rd Infantry Division, Wehrmacht, Germany
- 343rd Rifle Division, Soviet Union

== See also ==
- List of military divisions by number
