= 266th Division =

266th Division may refer to:

- 266th Infantry Division, Wehrmacht, Germany
- 266th Rifle Division, Soviet Union

== See also ==
- List of military divisions by number
