= Sturmgeschütz Brigade 341 =

Former German Army unit

- Active: 1943 - 1945
- Country: Germany
- Branch: Army
- Type: Assault gun
- Engagements: World War II: Battle of Normandy; Battle of Saint-Malo; Siegfried Line campaign

Sturmgeschütz Brigade 341 was a German Army unit of World War II that was equipped with Sturmgeschütz (usually abbreviated as StuG) assault guns. It was formed in 1943 and saw combat on the Western Front in France and Germany.

== History ==
The unit was established in December 1943 as Sturmgeschütz Abteilung 341 and was re-designated StuG Brigade 341 during February 1944. Located near Narbonne in the south of France, it was equipped with 19 StuG IIIs and 9 Sturmhaubitze 42s on 1 June 1944; this was less than the authorised strength of 45 armoured vehicles. It reached its full strength of 33 StuG IIIs and 12 Sturmhaubitze 42s by 1 July.

StuG Brigade 341 began moving towards Normandy on 25 July. Two batteries were committed to retake Avaranches on the 31st of July. Attached to Kampfgruppe Bacherer along with the III Abteilung 897 Infantry regiment, 77th infantry division of 2 battalions and two battalions II Fallschirmjäger-Ersatz-und-Ausbildung Regiment 2 FJD to retake the crossing points at Avaranches. Heavy fighting occurred whilst trying to retake Pontaubault bridge south of the city. The 1st Battery was the first unit to see action. During its first day of combat, the I battery and II battery lost twelve of its fourteen assault guns deployed. The 2nd Batterie was withdrawn to Dol-de-Bretagne, then the brigade was then committed to the defence of Dinan-Dinard-Saint Malo, La Rance river and Canal line to Rennes. The remaining elements of the I and II battery were deployed between Dinard and Saint Malo and were destroyed in the Battle of Saint-Malo. The III batterie arrived by train at Redon south of Rennes on the morning of the 2nd of August. AOK 7 ordered German units to withdraw from the breakout front to form new defensive areas and form a new front against Patton's Third Army, the new defence lines from Saint Malo-Rennes-Fougeres-Mortain-Domfront line and the second in depth the Mayenne River line.

On the night of the 2nd of August AOK 7 ordered the III battery consisting of 8 StuG and 2 StuH move from Redon to Laval by train. They disembarked on the western side of the Mayenne river bridge to defend the new defence line of the Mayenne River. German engineers had cut all river bridges across the Mayenne and Maine river line to Angers south of Laval. The company moved from Laval then north to Ville Mayenne with the 5th road convoy on the western side of the river (as the Laval bridges were already demolished) to cross the Mayenne River, in Ville Mayenne. The bridge was open for the retreating supply units from Rennes and the movement towards the buildup area north of the city for operation Lűttich.

On the 3rd of August the III battery joined Kampgruppe Coretti at Ville Mayenne and seen action against probing units of the US 90th infantry division and support elements on the 5th of August, the III batterie lost one Sturmgeschutz StuG and one StuH to US tanks from the US 745th battalion during the fighting in Ville Mayenne (although one is claimed by a bazooka also).

On the 6th and 7th of August heavy fighting occurred, the remaining three StuG and one StuH counterattacked against the US bridgehead at Mayenne with support elements of the 708 Infantry Division, 9th Panzer Panzer IV company, Panzer Lehr reconnaissance Abteilung and elements of the 1st Regiment of the 1st Sicherung Division, losing another vehicle to anti tank fire between Aaron and Mayenne. The kampfgruppe then conducted a fighting withdrawal to the North east towards Villanes-la-Juhel then Alençon. The unit by the 18th August had been caught in the encirclement by Pattons third Army to the south, retreating through the Falaise gap across the Seine river, reporting 365 men and no vehicles in September and retired to Holland for a rebuild of the unit.

Replacements were received, and on 1 October the brigade had 23 vehicles (of which 13 were in repair) and almost its full complement of personnel. In November StuG Brigade 341 was involved in fighting with US Army forces on the Siegfried Line.
