= Andreas von Aulock =

German general (1893–1968)

- Von Aulock (Saint-Malo, 1944) - a nazi propaganda photo publ. in the Netherlands
- Born: 23 March 1893; Kochelsdorf district of Kreuzburg, Upper Silesia
- Died: 23 June 1968 (aged 75); Wiesbaden
- Military career
- Allegiance: German Empire (to 1918); Weimar Republic (to 1920); Nazi Germany
- Branch: Army
- Service years: 1912–1945
- Rank: Oberst
- Commands: 79. Infanterie-Division; Festung St. Malo
- Conflicts: World War I: Battle of Verdun; Battle of Passchendaele; World War II: Invasion of Poland; Battle of France; Operation Barbarossa; Battle of Stalingrad; Battle of the Caucasus; Kuban bridgehead; Saint Malo
- Awards: Knight's Cross of the Iron Cross with Oak Leaves

Andreas Maria Karl von Aulock (23 March 1893 – 23 June 1968) was a highly decorated Oberst in the Wehrmacht during World War II who commanded the 79th Infantry Division. He was a recipient of the Knight's Cross of the Iron Cross with Oak Leaves.

Von Aulock was promoted to Oberst (Colonel) and received the Knight's Cross of the Iron Cross for operations in the Kuban bridgehead as commander of a combat group of the 79th Infantry Division in November 1943. He was captured on 17 August 1944 by forces of the American 83rd Division after surrendering the German garrison during the Battle of Saint-Malo.

== Awards and decorations ==
- Iron Cross (1914)
  - 2nd Class (9 November 1914)
  - 1st Class (23 February 1915)
- Honour Cross of the World War 1914/1918
- Clasp to the Iron Cross (1939)
  - 2nd Class (27 November 1939)
  - 1st Class (21 June 1940)
- Eastern Front Medal
- Kuban Shield
- German Cross in Gold on 27 October 1941 as Oberstleutnant in Infanterie-Regiment 226
- Knight's Cross of the Iron Cross with Oak Leaves
  - Knight's Cross on 6 November 1943 as Oberst and commander of Grenadier-Regiment 226
  - 551st Oak Leaves on 16 August 1944 as Oberst and Festungskommandant (Fortress commander) of St. Malo
