= Breton War =

Breton War may refer to:

- Breton–Norman war (1064–1066)
- War of the Breton Succession (1341–1365)
- French–Breton War (1487–1491)

== See also ==
- Brittany campaign
