= Ernst-Eberhard Hell =

German general (1887–1973)

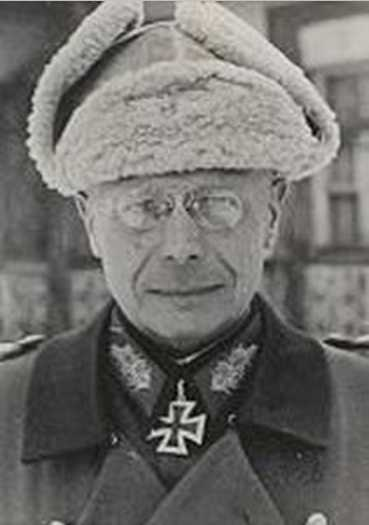
- Born: 25 September 1887; Stade, German Empire
- Died: 15 September 1973 (aged 85); Wiesbaden, West Germany
- Burial place: South Cemetery Wiesbaden
- Military career
- Allegiance: German Empire (to 1918); Weimar Republic (to 1933); Nazi Germany
- Branch: Heer
- Service years: 1906–1945
- Rank: General der Artillerie
- Commands: 269. Infanterie-Division; 15. Infanterie-Division; VII Armeekorps
- Conflicts: World War I World War II: Battle of France; Operation Barbarossa; Battle of Białystok–Minsk; Battle of Smolensk (1941); Battle of Moscow; Battle of Kursk; Cherkassy Pocket; First Jassy-Kishinev Offensive; Jassy–Kishinev Offensive (August 1944)
- Awards: Knight's Cross of the Iron Cross with Oak Leaves

Ernst-Eberhard Hell (19 September 1887 – 15 September 1973) was a German general in the Wehrmacht during World War II. He commanded several divisions and later an army corps. He was a recipient of the Knight's Cross of the Iron Cross with Oak Leaves of Nazi Germany.

Hell surrendered to the Soviet forces in August 1944 during the Soviet Jassy–Kishinev Offensive (August 1944). He was held in the Soviet Union as a war criminal until 1955.

== Awards and decorations ==
- Iron Cross (1914) 2nd Class (11 September 1914) & 1st Class
- Military Merit Order, 4th class with Swords (Bavaria)
- Military Merit Cross, 3rd class with War Decoration (Austria-Hungary)
- Silver Liakat Medal with Sabres
- Ottoman War Medal (Turkish: Harp Madalyası; "Gallipoli Star", "Iron Crescent")
- Clasp to the Iron Cross (1939) 2nd Class (12 May 1940) & 1st Class (17 May 1940)
- German Cross in Gold on 14 June 1942 as General der Artillerie and commander of VII Army Corps
- Knight's Cross of the Iron Cross with Oak Leaves
  - Knight's Cross on 1 February 1943 as General der Artillerie and commander of VII Army Corps
  - 400th Oak Leaves on 4 June 1944 as General der Artillerie and commander of VII Army Corps

Military offices
Preceded by None	Commander of 269th Infantry Division; 1 September 1939 - 12 August 1940	Succeeded by Generalleutnant Wolfgang Edler Herr und Freiherr von Plotho
Preceded by Generalleutnant Friedrich-Wilhelm von Chappuis	Commander of 15th Infantry Division; 12 August 1940 - 8 January 1942	Succeeded by Oberst Alfred Schreiber
Preceded by General der Artillerie Wilhelm Fahrmbacher	Commander of VII Army Corps; 8 January 1942 - 5 October 1943	Succeeded by General der Infanterie Anton Dostler
Preceded by General der Infanterie Anton Dostler	Commander of VII Army Corps; 30 November 1943 - August 1944	Succeeded by None
