= VII Army Corps (Wehrmacht) =

- VII. Armeekorps
- Active: October 1934 – August 1944
- Country: Nazi Germany
- Branch: Army
- Size: Corps
- Engagements: World War II: Invasion of Poland; Battle of France; Operation Barbarossa; Battle of Białystok–Minsk; Battle of Smolensk (1941); Battle of Moscow; Battle of Voronezh (1942); Battle of Kursk; Battle of Kiev (1943); Lower Dnieper Offensive; Cherkassy Pocket; Jassy–Kishinev Offensive (August 1944)

Commanders
- Notable commanders: Walther von Reichenau; Ernst-Eberhard Hell

VII Army Corps (VII. Armeekorps) was a corps in the German Army during World War II. It was destroyed in August 1944 during the Jassy–Kishinev Offensive (August 1944).

== Commanders ==
- Infantry General (General der Infanterie) Wilhelm Adam, October 1934 – 1 October 1935
- Artillery General (General der Artillerie) Walther von Reichenau, 1 October 1935 – 4 February 1938
- Infantry General (General der Infanterie) Eugen Ritter von Schobert, 4 February 1938 – 31 January 1940
- Lieutenant-General (Generalleutnant) Gotthard Heinrici, 1 February 1940 – April 1940
- Colonel General (Generaloberst) Eugen Ritter von Schobert, 9 April 1940 – 25 October 1940
- Artillery General (General der Artillerie) Wilhelm Fahrmbacher, 25 October 1940 – 8 January 1942
- Artillery General (General der Artillerie) Ernst-Eberhard Hell, 8 January 1942 – 5 October 1943
- Infantry General (General der Infanterie) Anton Dostler, 5 October 1943 – 30 November 1943
- Artillery General (General der Artillerie) Ernst-Eberhard Hell, 30 November 1943 – August 1944

== Area of operations ==
- Poland - September 1939 - May 1940
- France - May 1940 - June 1941
- Eastern Front, central sector - June 1941 - August 1944

== See also ==
- List of German corps in World War II
