= Wilhelm Fahrmbacher =

German WWII General (1888–1970)

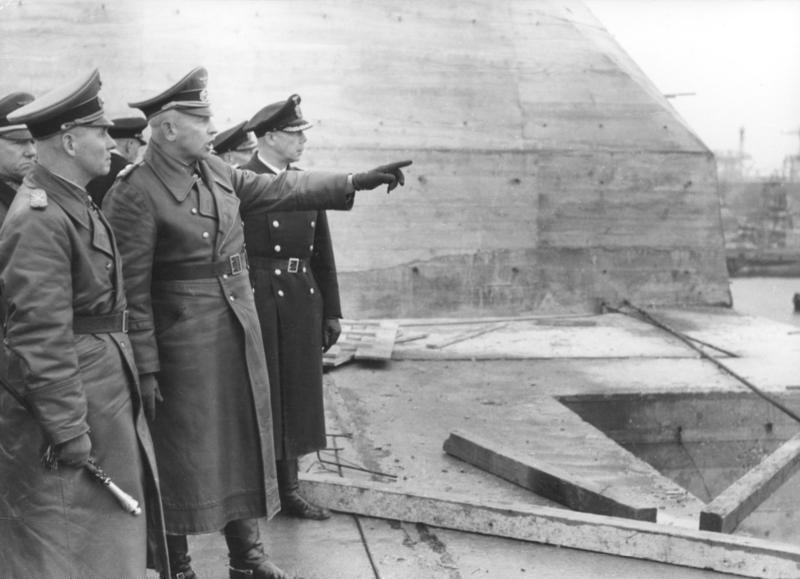
- Fahrmbacher next to Erwin Rommel in Saint-Nazaire (18 February 1944)
- Born: 19 September 1888; Zweibrücken, German Empire
- Died: 27 April 1970 (aged 81); Garmisch-Partenkirchen, West Germany
- Military career
- Allegiance: Kingdom of Bavaria (to 1919); Weimar Republic (to 1933); Nazi Germany
- Branch: Bavarian Army; Reichswehr; Heer
- Service years: 1907–1945
- Rank: General der Artillerie
- Commands: 5th Infantry Division; VII Army Corps; LXXXIV Corps; XXV Corps
- Conflicts: World War I World War II: German invasion of Poland; Battle of France; Operation Barbarossa; Battle of Białystok–Minsk; Battle of Smolensk (1941); Battle of Moscow; Operation Overlord
- Awards: Knight's Cross of the Iron Cross
- Other work: Advisor to the Egyptian Army 1951-58

Wilhelm Fahrmbacher (19 September 1888 – 27 April 1970) was a general in the Wehrmacht of Nazi Germany during World War II who commanded several corps, including VII Corps, XXV Corps and LXXXIV Corps, fighting on both the Eastern Front and Western Front.

Fahrmbacher joined the Bavarian Army on 18 July 1907 and fought throughout the First World War. After the war, he joined the Reichswehr, where he was rapidly promoted to command of the 5th Infantry Division. He led the 5th Infantry Division in Poland and France, before being promoted to command of the VII Army Corps, which he led during Operation Barbarossa.

In 1942, Fahrmbacher gained command of the XXV Corps in northern France, and after the Allied invasion of France, commanded the German forces holding the Lorient fortress, surrendering only after the unconditional surrender of Germany.

After WW2, Fahrmbacher was an advisor to the Egyptian Army from 1951 to 1958. He died in 1970.

== Early military career ==
On 18 July 1907, Fahrmbacher joined the 5th Field Artillery Regiment of the Bavarian Army in Landau. After attending the Munich Kriegsschule, he was promoted to lieutenant on 7 March 1910. On 22 January 1909, he was transferred to the 4th Field Artillery Regiment in Augsburg. Fahrmbacher attended the artillery and engineering school from October 1911 to the end of June 1912, and on 25 January 1914, he was appointed adjutant of his regiment.

== WW1 ==
In this position, Fahrmbacher took part in the early battles of the First World War. He was wounded on 24 August 1914 and briefly hospitalized. After recovering, he returned to his regiment and was promoted to first lieutenant on 19 May 1915. From December 1915 to the end of April 1916, he commanded a mountain cannon battery and then became the commander of the 6th Battery of the 21st Field Artillery Regiment before being transferred back to the 4th Field Artillery Regiment on 22 February 1917 as a regimental adjutant.

Fahrmbacher was promoted to captain on 22 March 1918, and held that rank until the Armistice brought hostilities to a close.

== Between the wars ==
In October 1919, Fahrmbacher joined the Reichswehr. Later, he worked in the Ministry of the Reichswehr and was eventually promoted to major general. On 15 August 1938, he took command of the 5th Infantry Division.

Fahrmbacher was promoted to lieutenant general on 31 May 1939, shortly before the outbreak of World War II.

== WW2 ==
=== Poland, France and the Soviet Union ===
Fahrmbacher led the 5th Infantry Division during the Invasion of Poland and the Battle of France. On 20 October 1940, he was promoted to General der Artillerie and appointed commander of the VII Army Corps, which he led during Operation Barbarossa as part of Army Group Centre, fighting in the Battle of Białystok–Minsk, Battle of Smolensk (1941), Battle of Vyazma, Battle of Moscow and Battle of Gshatsk.

=== Brittany Garrison ===
On 1 May 1942, Fahrmbacher assumed command of XXV Corps manning the Atlantic Wall in Brittany.

=== Operation Overlord ===
In May and June 1944, during Operation Overlord, Fahrmbacher temporarily led the LXXXIV Corps opposing the US forces in the Cotentin Peninsula. When Dietrich von Choltitz took command of LXXXIV Corps, Fahrmbacher returned to his command of XXV Corps, receiving orders to deny Brittany's ports, primarily Brest, Lorient, Saint-Malo and Saint-Nazaire to the Allies.

=== Defense of Brittany ===
On 31 July 1944, with US forces breaking out into Brittany after Operation Cobra, Fahrmbacher was ordered to send all his mobile troops to hold the Pontaubault bridge. He dispatched the remnants of the 77th Division and a company of assault guns, which reached Pontaubault in the late afternoon, too late to prevent US forces from advancing over the bridge.

=== Defense of Lorient Fortress ===
Although XXV Corps theoretically commanded the whole of Brittany, Fahrmbacher was isolated in Lorient and was unable to command the German forces in the fortresses of Brest and St. Malo, exercising command of Lorient and Saint-Nazaire only.

On 9 August, the US 4th Armored Division, led by Major General John S. Wood, began probing Lorient's defenses, but reported that they were too strong to be quickly captured. Fahrmbacher later stated that had the Americans attacked Lorient before 9 August, they would probably have succeeded.

After 10 August, as contact with Saint-Nazaire had been lost and Lorient's fortress commander was injured, Fahrmbacher took direct command of Lorient's defenses. Fahrmbacher's successful defense of the Lorient fortress, which included the nearby Quiberon peninsula, prevented the implementation of Operation Chastity a plan to develop an artificial port in Quiberon Bay to supply the Twelfth United States Army Group.

The Lorient fortress held out under Fahrmbacher's command for the rest of the war, with Fahrmbacher organizing raids to bring food into the fortress and ordering the adulteration of the troops' bread with sawdust from railway sleepers in order to eke out their rations.

=== Surrender ===
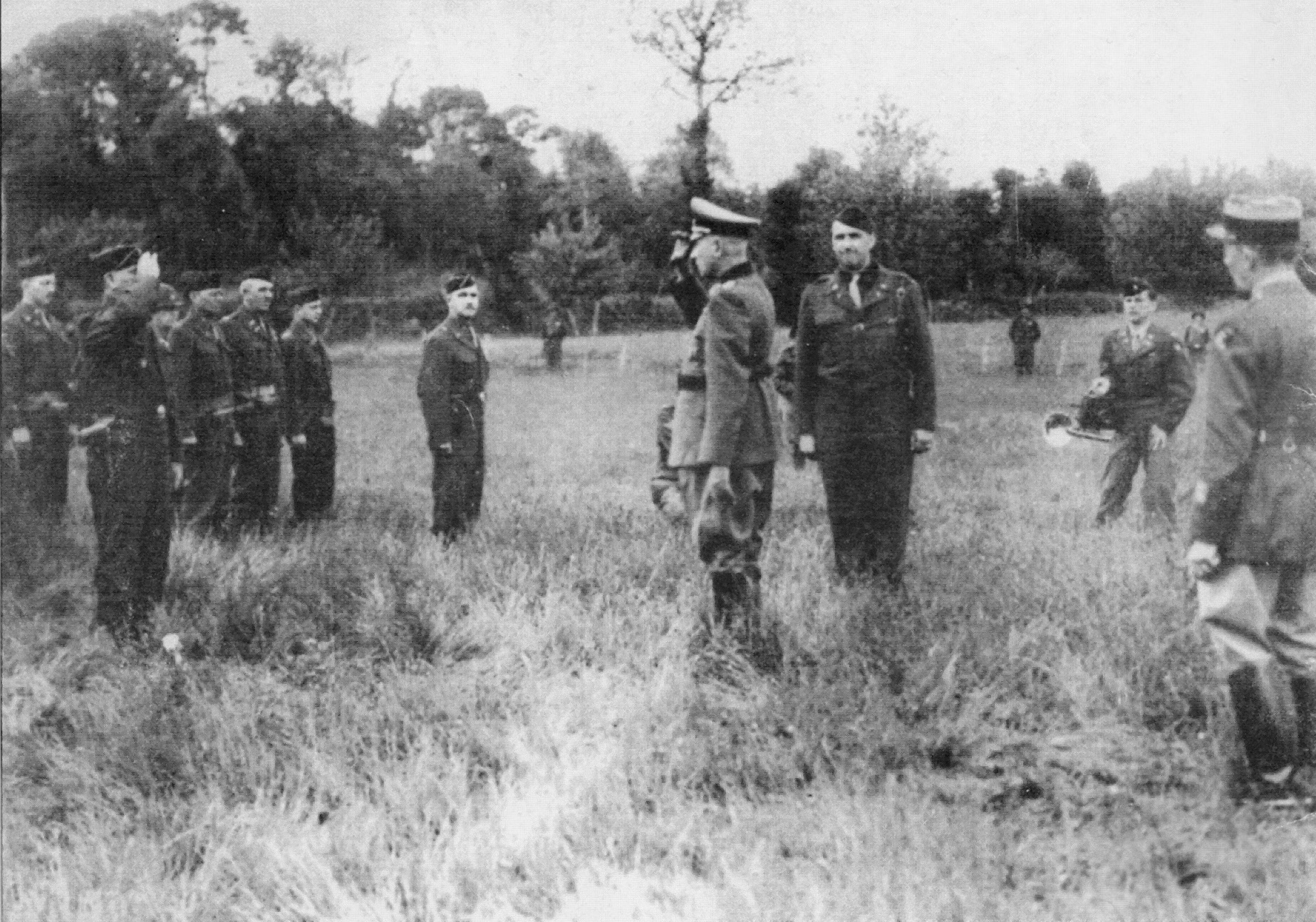
10 May 1945: General Fahrmbacher surrenders the Lorient fortress.

On 7 May 1945, with Germany's unconditional surrender, German and American forces met near Étel to arrange a truce, preparatory to the surrender of the German forces in the Lorient fortress. Three days later, a surrender ceremony took place near Caudan, during which Fahrmbacher formally surrendered his forces to General Herman F. Kramer of the US 66th Infantry Division.

Fahrmbacher's last radio message to Reichspräsident Karl Dönitz on the afternoon of the surrender, was "Wish to sign off with my steadfast and unbeaten men. We remember our sorely tried homeland. Long live Germany!".

== Postwar career and death ==
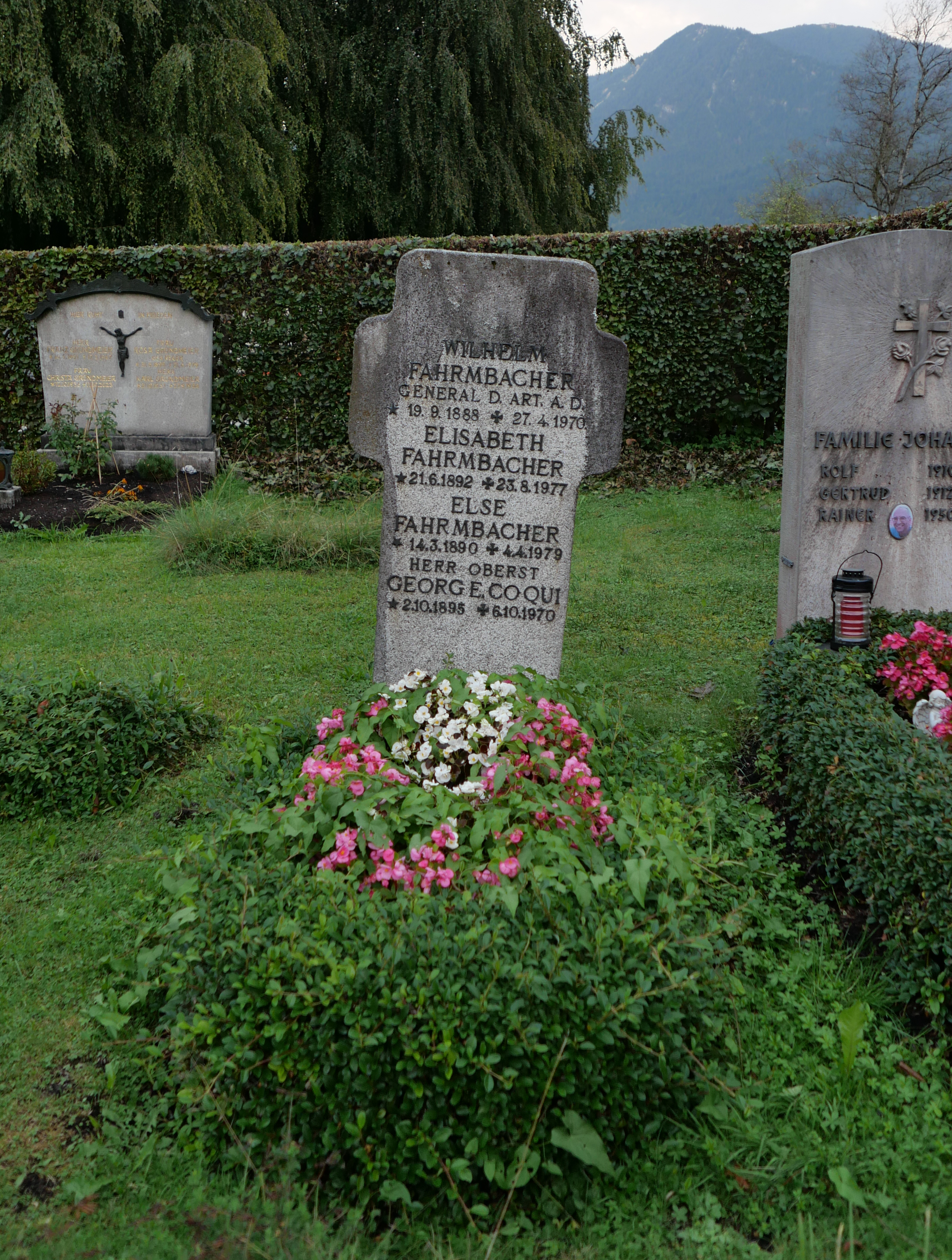
The grave in 2024.

Upon Germany's surrender in 1945, Fahrmbacher was interned in France until 1950, during which time he wrote an appreciation of the Battle of Brittany for the Foreign Military Studies Branch of the US Army.

After his release, Fahrmbacher served as a military advisor in Egypt from 1951 to 1958. Fahrmbacher and six aides arrived in Egypt as the initial party of about thirty officers.

According to CIA operative Miles Copeland Jr., Fahrmbacher was recommended to Egyptian president Gamal Abdel Nasser by a US military attaché as part of a scheme to place ex-Nazi CIA assets in position in countries the CIA wished to influence. Copeland further commented that Fahrmbacher was a "placement problem" – too well known as a Nazi to be welcome in 1950s Germany but without the talents to be in demand elsewhere. However, Fahrmbacher was of impressive rank, and the CIA gained kudos with Nasser by arranging his employment.

Whilst in Egypt, Fahrmbacher, who was attempting to remodel the Egyptian Army with the goal of making it capable of performing large scale operations, was the subject of an assassination plot by the Israeli secret service, Mossad. However, the plot was discovered and prevented by the Egyptian security services. He also wrote a history of creation and defense of the Lorient fortress.

Fahrmbacher died on 27 April 1970 in Garmisch-Partenkirchen, West Germany. He is buried at the cemetery of Garmisch.

== Awards and decorations ==
- Knight's Cross of the Iron Cross on 24 June 1940 as Generalleutnant and commander of 5th Jäger Division
- German Cross in Silver on 30 October 1943 as General der Artillerie and commander of XXV Army Corps

== See also ==
- Atlantic pockets – French, Belgian and Dutch ports fortified to deny their capacity to the Allies
- German World War II strongholds - Towns and cities fortified to hold out against Allied offensives
- Operation Damocles - Mossad operation targeting German scientists developing rockets for Egypt

== Notes ==
Military offices
Preceded by Generalleutnant Eugen Hahn	Commander of 5. Infanterie-Division; August 1938 – 25 October 1940	Succeeded by Generalmajor Karl Allmendinger
Preceded by Generaloberst Eugen Ritter von Schobert	Commander of VII. Armeekorps; 25 October 1940 – 8 January 1942	Succeeded by General der Artillerie Ernst-Eberhard Hell
Preceded by General der Infanterie Karl Ritter von Prager	Commander of XXV. Armeekorps; 1 May 1942 – 10 June 1944	Succeeded by General der Infanterie Dietrich von Choltitz
Preceded by General der Artillerie Erich Marcks	Commander of LXXXIV. Armeekorps; 10 June 1944 – 16 June 1944	Succeeded by General der Infanterie Dietrich von Choltitz
Preceded by General der Infanterie Dietrich von Choltitz	Commander of XXV. Armeekorps; 16 June 1944 – 10 May 1945	Succeeded by none
