= Battle for Brest =

Battle in World War II

- Part of Operation Overlord, Battle of Normandy
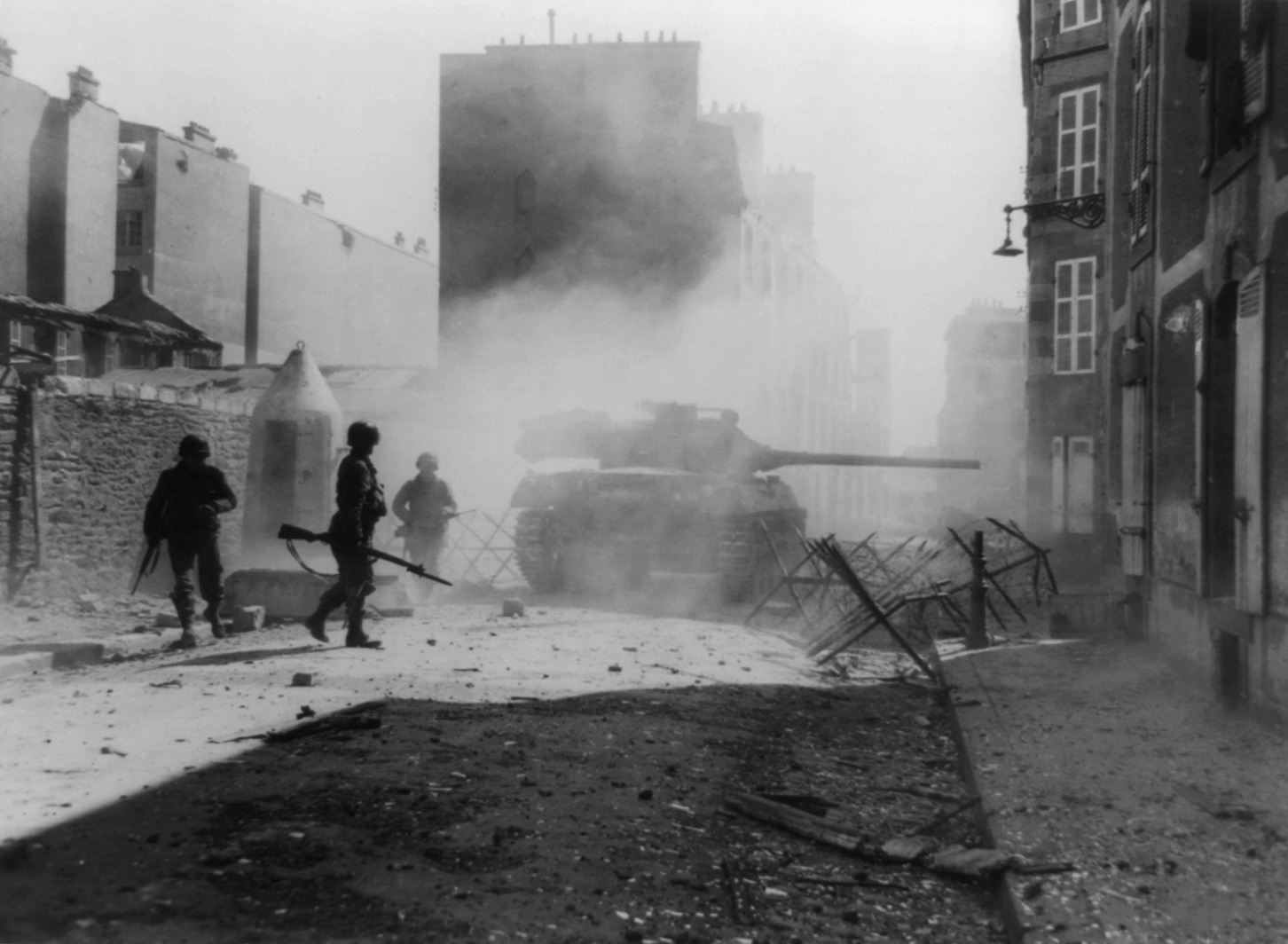
- A US M18 Hellcat of the 705th Tank Destroyer Battalion in the streets of Brest in September 1944
Date	7 August – 20 September 1944
Location	Brest, Brittany, France 48°23′27″N 4°29′08″W
Result	Allied victory

Belligerents
United States; United Kingdom	Germany

Commanders and leaders
(United States) Troy H. Middleton (United States) Walter M. Robertson (United States) William H. Simpson (United States) Charles H. Gerhardt	(Nazi Germany) Hermann-Bernhard Ramcke (surrendered) (Nazi Germany) Hans Kroh (surrendered) (Nazi Germany) Erwin Rauch (surrendered)

Units involved
VIII Corps; 2nd Infantry Division; 8th Infantry Division; 29th Infantry Division; 35th Engineer Combat Battalion; 2nd Ranger Battalion; 644th Tank Destroyer Battalion; 5th Ranger Battalion; 23rd Headquarters Special Troops; 79th Armoured Division (elements); 6th Armored Division (elements)	2nd Fallschirmjäger-Division; 266. Infanterie-Division; 343. Infanterie-Division

Strength
75,000 men	45,000 men

Casualties and losses
9,831 killed or wounded	38,000 captured

The Battle for Brest was fought in August and September 1944 on the Western Front during World War II. Part of the overall Battle for Brittany and the Allied plan for the invasion of mainland Europe called for the capture of port facilities, in order to ensure the timely delivery of the enormous amount of war materiel required to supply the invading Allied forces. It was estimated that the 37 Allied divisions to be on the continent by September 1944 would need 26,000 tons of supplies each day. The main port the Allied forces hoped to seize and put into their service was Brest, in northwestern France.

== Background ==
Early in the war, after the Fall of France in 1940, the United States and the United Kingdom began planning an eventual "Invasion of Western Europe" to be put into effect when and if the United States joined the war. American and Canadian troops would be moved from North America to England until an Allied invasion could be mounted on the continent.

A major issue was how to supply the invasion army with the tens of thousands of tons of material it would need after it landed. The capture of ports on the European Atlantic coast was a necessity, and the most suitable ones were clear invasion objectives. The capture of these port facilities was deemed crucial because a lack of supplies would strand an invading army. For the initial phase of the battle, large artificial ports (Mulberry Harbors) would be erected on the beaches, but they had limited unloading capacity and were considered a contingency until real ports could be captured and put into service.

Suitable ports were all along the northern coast of France, in particular the port of Brest in Brittany, for a long time the main French Fleet harbour on the Atlantic coast and the westernmost port in France. The Allied strategists even considered it possible that, after its capture, supplies could arrive directly from the US to Brest, bypassing England and reaching the Allied Armies moving east, towards Germany, much faster.

Other ports were Saint Malo, Lorient, and Saint Nazaire in Brittany and Cherbourg and Le Havre in Normandy (which would eventually be selected as the invasion landing area). Operation Sledgehammer, the capture of Cherbourg, had been considered by the Allies, but it was cancelled after the disastrous 1942 Dieppe Raid. It was decided that a direct attack on a port from the sea was not an option.

The Germans, realizing this, began building fortifications around these ports earlier in the war through their Organization Todt, as part of the Atlantic Wall concept. Some of these ports were major U-boat bases as well, and had bomb-proof concrete submarine pens built. These fortifications had been surviving Allied air strikes for some time. Local resistance groups operating in Brittany especially near Brest sent spies to observe and report German naval activity such as arrival and departure of U-boats and other Kriegsmarine naval ships. If these ports, where the U-boat bases were located, were to fall into the hands of the Allies, the submarines out at sea would have to fight their way around England, pass Allied destroyers and aircraft to ports in Belgium, The Netherlands, Denmark, Norway, or Germany still under German control, while docked U-boats would be captured or put out of commission.

== Prelude ==
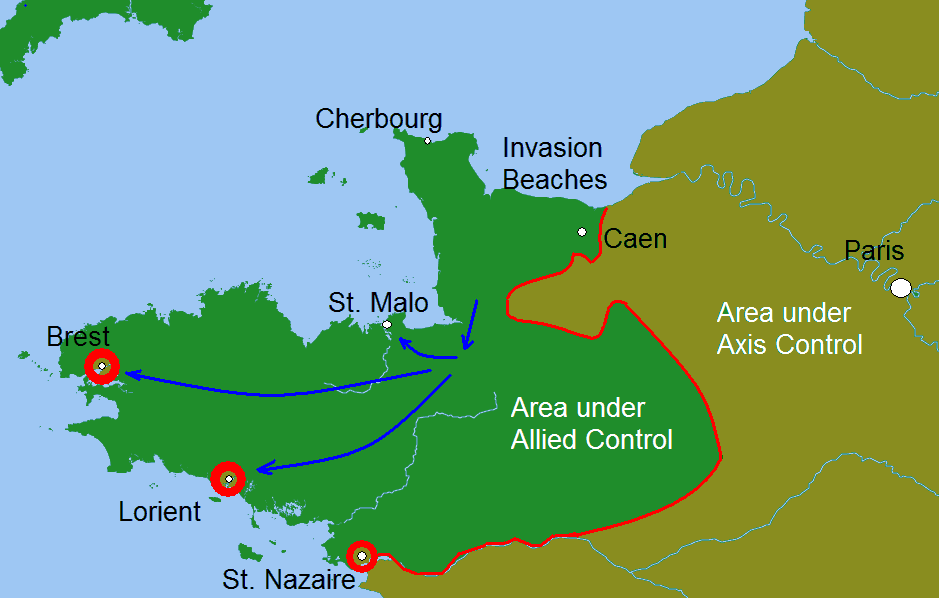
Brittany, NW France by mid-August 1944. The Allies manage to occupy the Breton countryside and are already moving east towards Paris. The blue arrows represent the approach routes to Brest and other ports

Soon after Normandy was invaded, the Mulberries were towed from England and deployed on the French coast. Unfortunately for the Allies, one of them was destroyed after less than two weeks by a storm. Supplies were then mainly landed directly via the beaches, but this process was not as efficient.

Cherbourg, at the tip of the Cotentin Peninsula in Normandy, was captured by the Americans who landed on Utah Beach, but the German garrison destroyed its harbour facilities before surrendering. Cherbourg was the only major port in the Allied invasion area. Soon after, the Germans in the Brittany peninsula were isolated by a north–south breakthrough accomplished by George S. Patton's Third United States Army, exploiting the success of Operation Cobra. The US VIII Corps was diverted into Brittany to capture Brest and secure the northern flank of the breakthrough and to prevent German reinforcements to Army Group B and threatening the Falaise pocket as well as fortifying the defenses of the French capital of Paris. Wehrmacht troops trapped in Brittany retreated to the fortified ports in the peninsula, as US Third Army troops moved in and surrounded them. The Brest garrison, Festung Brest, meaning "Fortress Brest", as German propaganda referred to surrounded cities, was put under the command of General der Fallschirmtruppe Hermann-Bernhard Ramcke, a paratroop veteran of the Afrika Korps and described by historian Derek Mallett as "fanatical", who had been ordered by Hitler to fight to the last man. His forces consisted of his own 2nd Parachute Division, and other regular army units (about half his force), together with other Wehrmacht elements, in all some 40,000 fighting men.

The old fortress city of Saint-Malo was captured by the 83rd Infantry Division ("Ohio") on 17 August, but its small port facilities were sabotaged by the defenders. A German garrison stationed at nearby Cézembre Island surrendered only after days of heavy shelling by warships and strong air strikes, when their naval guns were already disabled. The aerial bombing of the island marked one of the first uses of napalm bombs. It was clear that the Germans would deny the Allies the use of French ports as long as possible by defending the fortresses built around them and severely damaging their docks.

Brest was reached by American troops on 7 August 1944; It was surrounded and isolated while troops and equipment, ammunition and other supplies, were gathered for the assault. This began on 25 August 1944.

== Battle ==
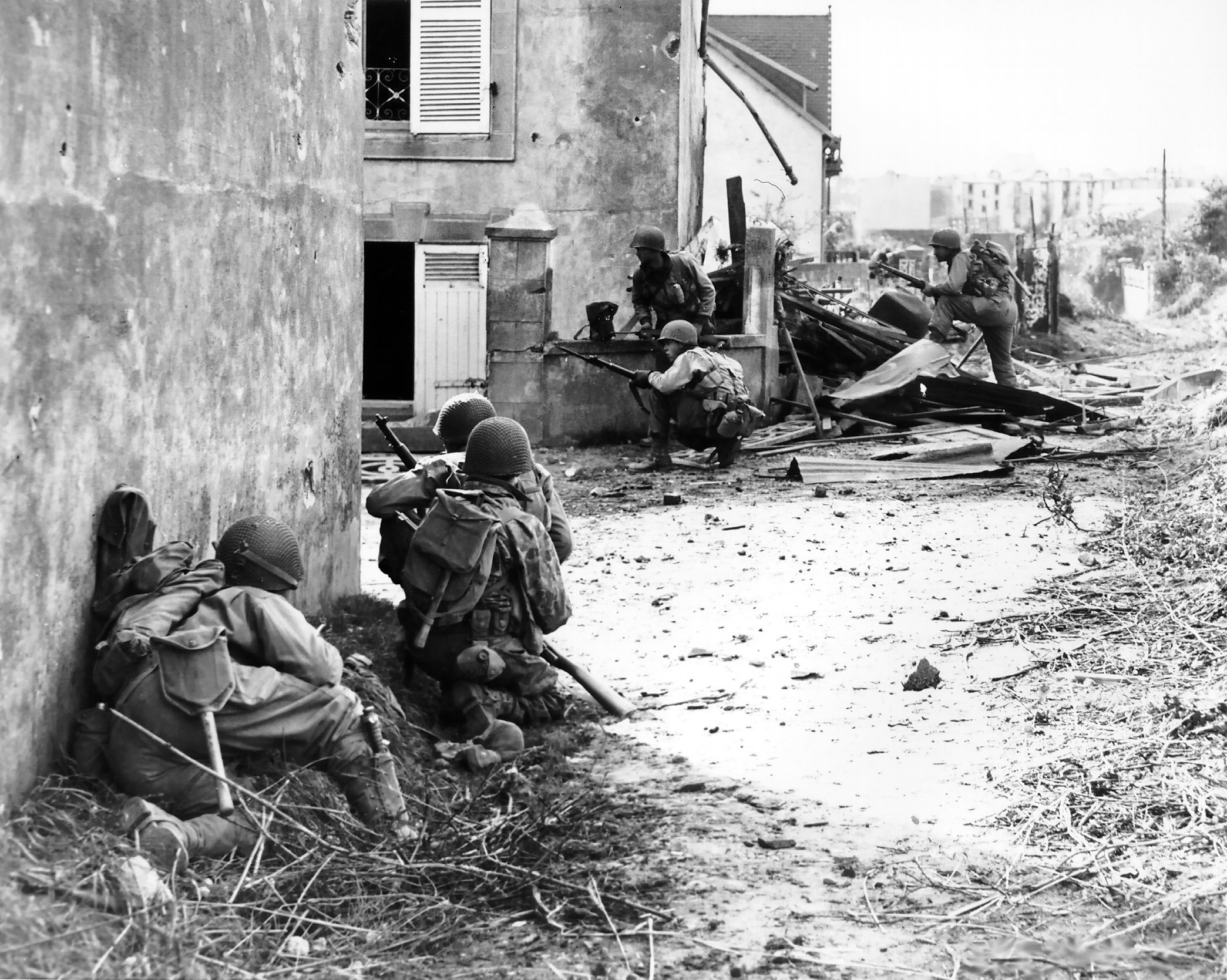
Troops of the 2nd Infantry Division advance under machine gun fire into the outskirts of Brest

Brest was stormed by the U.S. VIII Corps, comprising the 2nd, 8th, and 29th Infantry Divisions, supported by US Rangers, armoured units and combat engineers, some 75,000 men in all. The German garrison was well entrenched and made up of the 266th and 343rd Infantry Divisions as well as Fallschirmjäger (paratrooper) forces, and Kriegsmarine personnel ranging from U-boat and E-Boat crews to battleship sailors, including those who were survivors rescued from damaged or sunk vessels, formed into Naval Infantry units of the Marine Stosstrupp Kompanie, together with soldiers of disbanded Luftwaffe Field Division sent to reinforce the Normandy coast; altogether some 40,000 men.

As per their military doctrine, the Americans tried to use their superior artillery firepower and air superiority to overcome the defenders. The Germans had stocked a considerable amount of ammunition for the defense of the city and had weapons of all calibers (from light flak to naval guns) dug into fortifications and in pillboxes. Elements of the specialised British 79th Armoured Division came in to attack the heavily fortified Fort Montbarey. Flamethrowing Churchill Crocodile tanks along with US infantry took three days to overcome the fort.

The fighting was intense, with the troops moving from house to house. The fortifications (both French and German built) proved very difficult to overcome, and heavy artillery barrages were fired by both sides.

Eventually the old city of Brest was razed to the ground during the battle, with only some medieval stone-built fortifications left standing.

General Ramcke surrendered the city on 19 September 1944 to the Americans after rendering the port facilities useless. They would not be repaired in time to help the war effort as it was hoped. The last German outpost surrendered at Audierne on 20 September. By this time, Paris had already been liberated by the Allied Armies, and Operation Market-Garden was already under way in the Netherlands.

=== "These are my credentials" ===
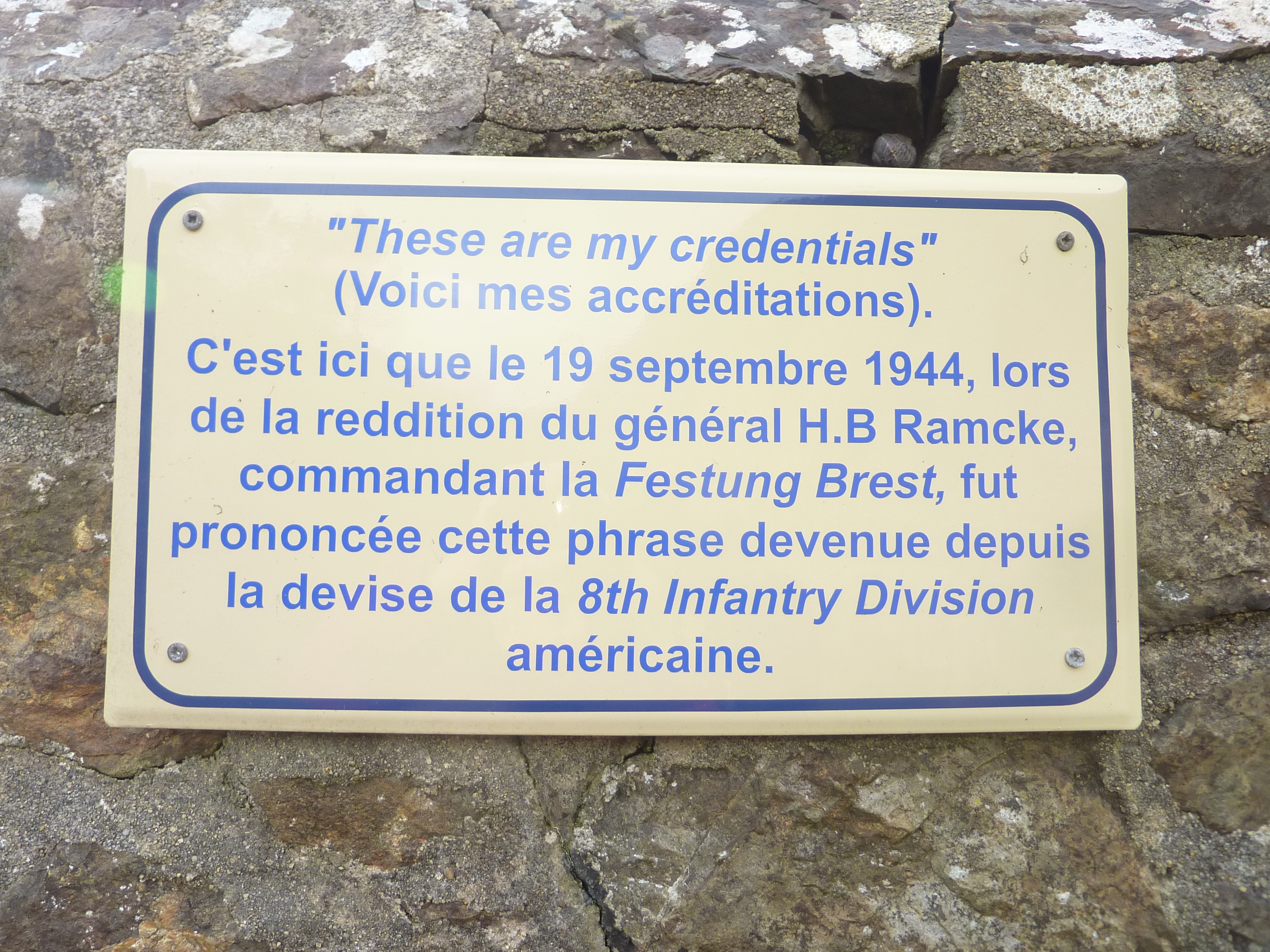
Commemorative plaque of General Hermann-Bernhard Ramcke's surrender, 19 September 1944 (ammunition bay near the fort des Capucins)

When U.S. Brigadier General Charles Canham arrived to accept Ramcke's surrender, the latter asked the lower-ranking man to show his credentials. Canham pointed to his nearby troops and said "These are my credentials". Canham was at the time the deputy commander of the U.S. 8th Infantry Division; that phrase has since become the division's motto.

== Aftermath ==
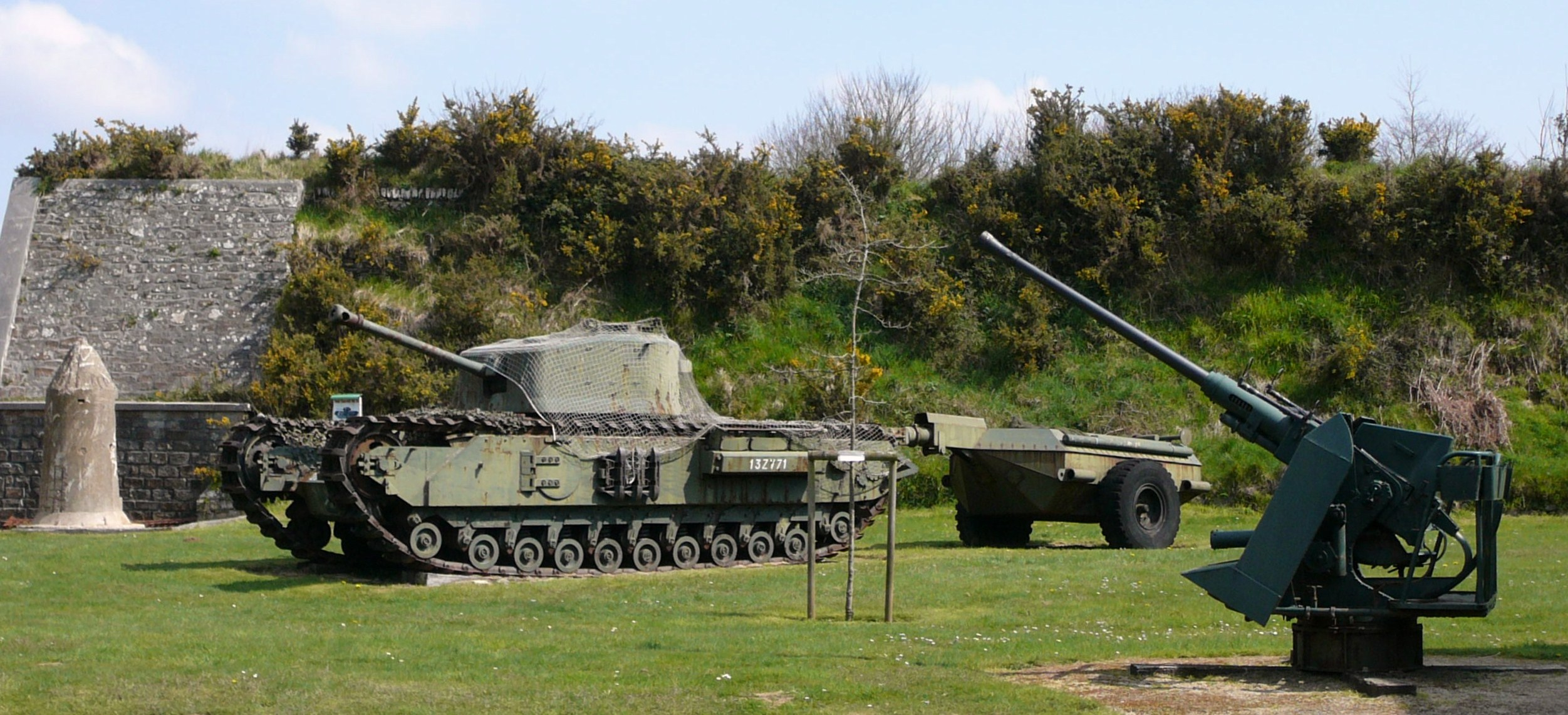
Fort Montbary today with a Churchill "Crocodile"

The costly capture of Brest resulted in the decision to only surround the remaining German-occupied ports in France with the exception of those that could be captured from the march, instead of storming them in a set-piece battle. The exception was Le Havre, which was taken by the British 2nd Army on 12 September 1944. Some of these Breton ports surrendered only by 9 May 1945, one day after Victory in Europe Day.

The whole Overlord campaign developed somewhat differently than originally planned. Patton's US Third Army's quick advance allowed the Liberation of Paris to occur earlier than expected.

Despite the U.S. Army committing 75,000 troops to the capture of Brest of which 10,000 would become casualties, not a single Allied troop ship or supply vessel had docked in Brest by the time Paris fell to the Allies.

For the French people in Brittany, the presence of American soldiers was a good sign that four years of the German occupation had come to an end and hope was drawing near, especially for the local Jewish population who had been in hiding or on the run from the German regime, and others who had run afoul of the Vichy regime or the German occupiers.

In 1946 Ramcke was held in French custody awaiting trial for war crimes relating to the fighting at Brest. The crimes he was charged with included the execution of French civilians, the looting of civilian property and the intentional destruction of civilian houses.

After the war, the West German government paid reparations to civilians in Brest who had been killed, starved, or left homeless.

== See also ==
- Liberation of France
- Battle for Brittany
- Battle of Saint-Malo
- Saint-Nazaire pocket
