= 266th Infantry Division =

- 266. Infanterie-Division
- Active: May 1943 - September 1944
- Country: Nazi Germany
- Branch: Heer (Wehrmacht)
- Type: Infantry
- Size: Division

The 266th Infantry Division (German: 266. Infanterie-Division) was an infantry division of the German Heer during World War II.

== History ==
The 266th Infantry Division was formed on 20 May 1943 at Münsingen military base in Wehrkreis V. It was assembled using recruits from all over southern Germany as a static (i.e. non-motorized) division. The battalions and detachments initially reported to the division headquarters on 15 June and deployment was completed by 1 August. The 266th Infantry Division initially consisted of the Grenadier Regiments 897, 898, and 899, as well as the Artillery Regiment 266. The infantry regiments were equipped with two battalions each, and the artillery regiment's detachments were equipped with Beutewaffe howitzers of Soviet origin. The only commander throughout the division's history was Karl Sprang, who has appointed upon the unit's formation.

Upon deployment to occupied France, Grenadier Regiment 898 as well as the second detachment of Artillery Regiment 266 to the 343rd Infantry Division.

The division was largely destroyed by Allied forces, including the 4th U.S. Armored Division, during the battles at Saint-Malo in July 1944. Small parts of the 266th Division escaped into the besieged Atlantic pockets in Brittany. With the fall of Brest on 19 September, the last remnants of the division were neutralized. The 266th Infantry Division was formally dissolved on 29 September 1944.

== War crimes ==
In northern Finistère at the beginning of August 1944, the 266th artillery regiment began a punitive operation in Saint-Pol-de Léon. On August 4, fifteen inhabitants were taken out of the city on a truck. Five days later, their exhumed bodies were found with their hands tied and their skulls caved in; one had been scalped. The sole woman, partially undressed, had large marks on her thighs and legs. Continuing to the West, the unit left behind dead bodies and burned farms: eighteen were killed in Plounévez-Lochrist, five in Tréflez and thirty-three in Plouvien on August 8 and 9.

== Superior formations ==
Organizational chart of the 266th Infantry Division
Year	Month	Army Corps	Army	Army Group	Area
1943	July	In assembly.			Münsingen
1943	August – December	LXXIV	7th Army	Army Group D	Brittany
1944	January – April	LXXIV	7th Army	Army Group D	Brittany
1944	May – June	LXXIV	7th Army	Army Group B	Brittany
1944	July	LXXIV (partially) II Parachute (partially)	7th Army	Army Group B	Brittany (partially) Saint-Malo (partially)
1944	August – September	XXV	None.	Army Group D	Brittany

== Noteworthy individuals ==
- Karl Sprang, divisional commander between 20 May 1943 and August 1944.
