= 343rd Infantry Division =

- 343. Infanterie-Division
- Active: 1 October 1942 – 29 September 1944
- Country: Nazi Germany
- Branch: German Army
- Type: Infantry
- Size: Division
- Engagements: World War II

The 343rd Infantry Division (German: 343. Infanterie-Division) was an infantry division of the German Heer during World War II.

== History ==
The 343. Infanterie-division was formed on 1 October 1942 on the Truppenübungsplatz (training ground) of Grafenwöhr in Wehrkreis XIII.
In November 1942, it was sent to France in the Brest region of Brittany as an occupation and coastal defense force.

It found itself surrounded by American forces in Brest from August 1944 and withdrew to the Crozon peninsula.
The division was destroyed on 19 September 1944 with the fall of Brest Fortress and officially dissolved on 29 September 1944.

== Commanders ==
- Generalleutnant Friedrich Zickwolff (28 September 1942 - 25 August 1943) : died of wounds inflicted by French Partisans
- Generalmajor Hermann Kruse (25 August 1943 - 1 February 1944)
- Generalleutnant Erwin Rauch (1 February 1944 - 18 September 1944) : POW

== Sources ==
- Lexikon der Wehrmacht
- Axis History
