= Atlantic Wall =

Nazi Germany coastal fortifications

- Part of Nazi Germany
- Western coast of Continental Europe and Scandinavia
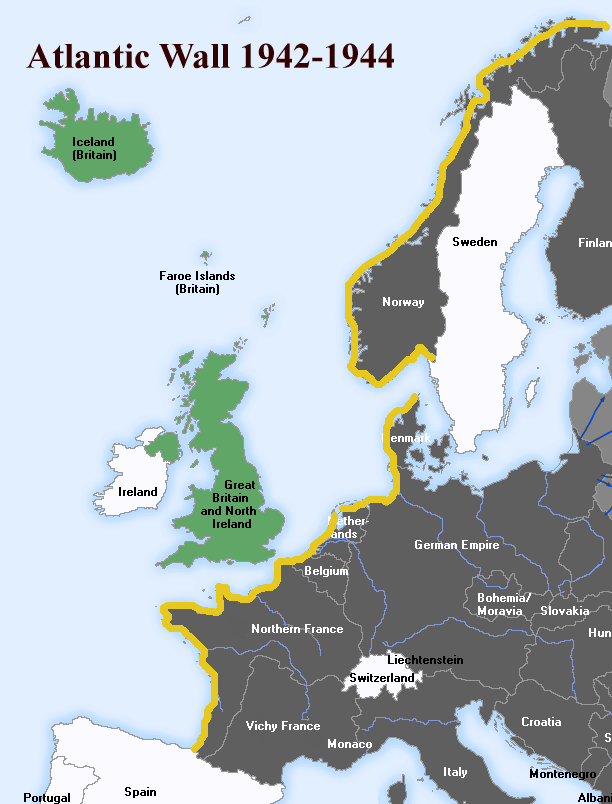

Site information
- Type: Coastal defence and fortifications
- Controlled by: Nazi Germany
- Condition: Partially demolished; mostly intact

Location
- Length: 2687 kilometers (1670 miles)

Site history
- Built: 1942–1944
- Built by: Forced labourers
- In use: 1942–1945
- Materials: Concrete; Wood; Steel
- Battles/wars: World War II
- Events: St Nazaire Raid; Dieppe Raid; Operation Overlord; Operation Undergo; Battle of the Scheldt

Garrison information
- Past commanders: Erwin Rommel (1943–1944)
- Occupants: Wehrmacht

The Atlantic Wall (German: Atlantikwall) was an extensive system of coastal defences and fortifications built by Nazi Germany between 1942 and 1944 along the coast of continental Europe and Scandinavia as a defence against an anticipated Allied invasion of Nazi-occupied Europe from the United Kingdom, during World War II. The manning and operation of the Atlantic Wall was administratively overseen by the German Army, with some support from Luftwaffe ground forces. The Kriegsmarine (German Navy) maintained a separate coastal defence network, organised into a number of sea defence zones.

Adolf Hitler ordered the construction of the fortifications in 1942 through his Führer Directive No. 40. More than half a million French workers were drafted to build it. The wall was frequently mentioned in Nazi propaganda, where its size and strength were usually exaggerated. The fortifications included colossal coastal guns, batteries, mortars, and artillery, and thousands of artillery pieces were stationed in its defences. (Note: The coast defence along the North Cape down to the Spanish border included artillery pieces and naval guns from 105 mm to 406 mm and were organised into over 800 batteries. In addition, there were over 250 batteries of guns ranging from 75 mm to 90 mm, including anti-aircraft artillery.) Today, ruins of the wall exist in all of the nations where it was built, although many structures have fallen into the ocean or have been demolished over the years.

== Background ==
World War II in Europe began on 1 September 1939, with Nazi Germany's invasion of Poland. Two days later, the UK and France declared war on Germany. Poland's geographical location, however, prevented the Allies from intervening directly. Four weeks into the attack, the Germans had successfully occupied Poland. Less than a month after this victory, Adolf Hitler issued a directive stating that Germany must be ready for an offensive through France and the Low Countries. However, the Oberkommando der Wehrmacht (German high command; OKW) was convinced that preparations would take at least until the following year. After furious arguments, Hitler reluctantly agreed to wait. In May 1940, three massive German army groups overran France and the Low Countries in little more than six weeks.

== History ==
=== Creation ===
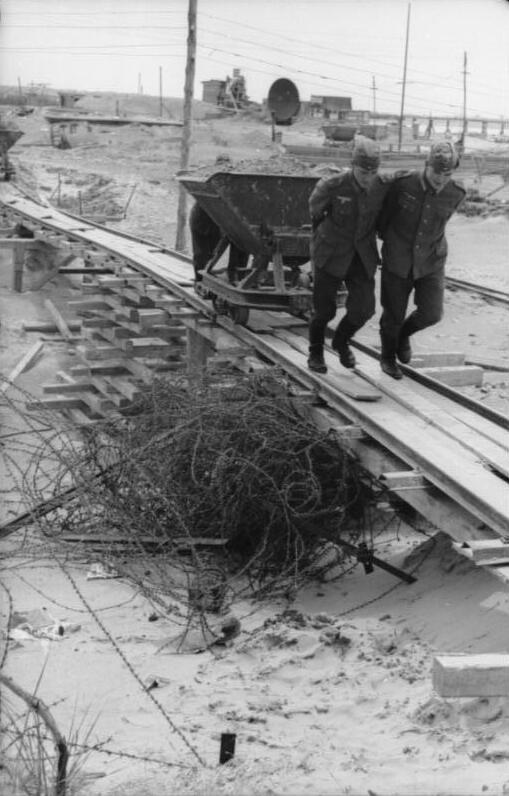
Construction of the Atlantic Wall fortifications in the 1940s

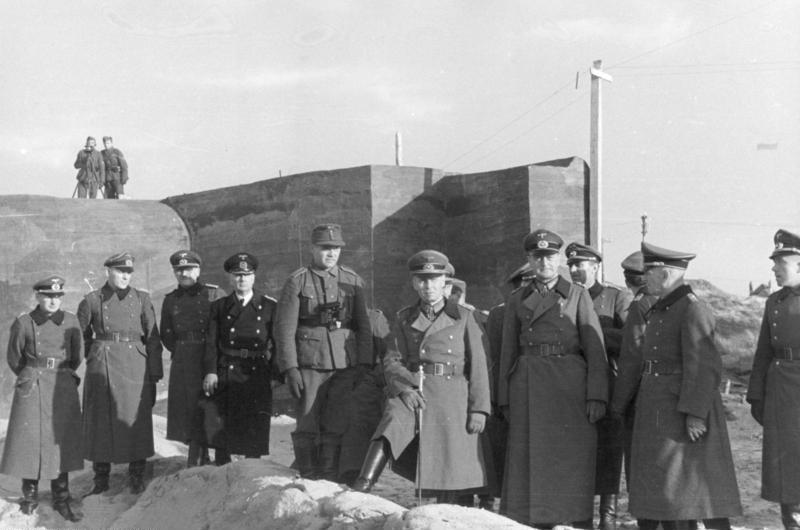
Field Marshal Erwin Rommel visiting the Atlantic Wall defences near the Belgian port of Ostend, part of the fortifications which today comprise the Atlantic Wall Open Air Museum at Raversijde

Prior to the Atlantic Wall decision, following a number of commando raids, on 2 June 1941 that Adolf Hitler asked for maps of the Channel Islands. These were provided the next day and by 13 June 1941 Hitler had made a decision. Ordering additional men to the islands and having decided the defences were inadequate, lacking tanks and coastal artillery, the Organisation Todt (OT) was instructed to undertake the building of 200–250 strong points in each of the larger islands. The plan was finalised by the OT and submitted to Hitler. The original defence order was reinforced with a second dated 20 October 1941, following a Fuhrer conference on 18 October to discuss the engineers' assessment of requirements. The permanent fortification of the Channel Islands was to make them into an impregnable fortress to be completed within 14 months. Festungspionierkommandeur XIV was created to command the project of fortifying the Channel Islands.

It was six months later on 23 March 1942 that Hitler issued Führer Directive No. 40, which called for the creation of an "Atlantic Wall". He ordered naval and submarine bases to be heavily defended. Fortifications remained concentrated around ports until late in 1943, when defences were increased in other areas. This decision required the army engineers and the OT to organise quickly. Massive supplies of cement, steel reinforcing and armour plate would be required and everything would need to be transported.

Nazi propaganda claimed that the wall stretched from the cape of Norway down to the Spanish border.

=== Regelbau ===
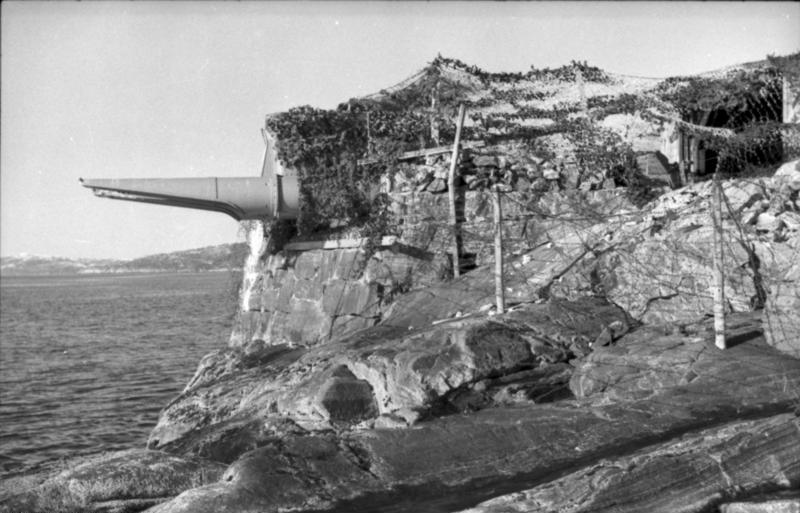
Camouflaged German torpedo battery in northern Norway

The Regelbau (standard build) system used books of plans for each of over 600 approved types of bunker and casemate, each having a specific purpose, having been updated as enemy constructions were overrun and examined, even testing some to destruction for effectiveness. They incorporated standard features, such as an entrance door at right angles, armoured air intake, 30-millimetre (1.2 in) steel doors, ventilation and telephones, internal walls lined with wood, and an emergency exit system. There were over 200 standardised armour parts.

The standardisation greatly simplified the manufacture of equipment, the supply of materials and the budgetary and financial control of the construction as well as the speed of planning for construction projects.

To offset shortages, captured equipment from the French and other occupied countries armies were incorporated in the defences, casemates designed for non-German artillery, anti tank and machine guns and the use of turrets from obsolete tanks in tobrukstand pill boxes (tobruk pits).

=== Organisation Todt ===
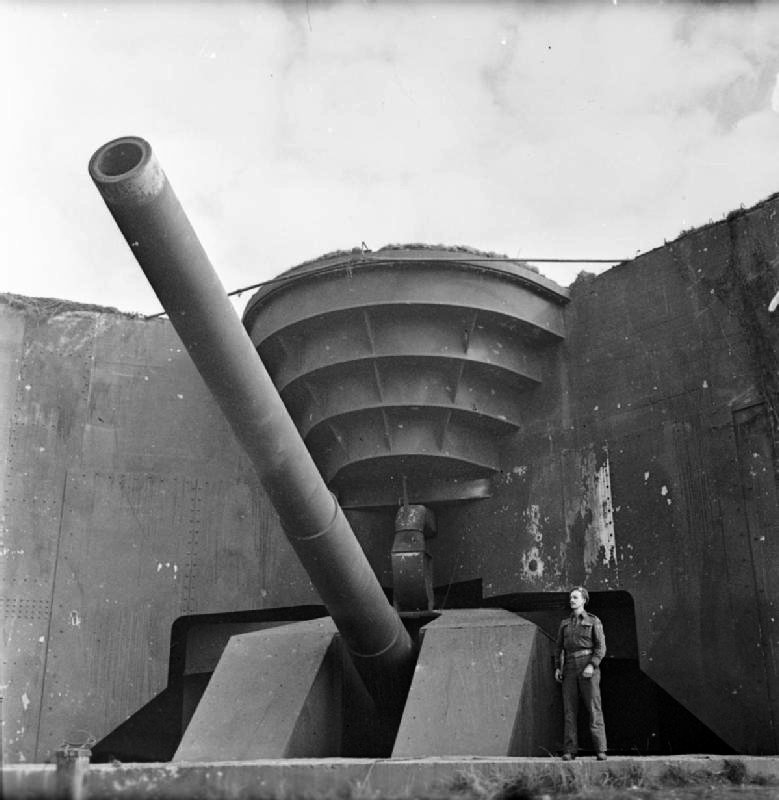
A British soldier poses next to the recently captured German 380 mm gun Todt Battery at Cap Gris Nez.

Organisation Todt (OT), formed in 1933, had designed the Siegfried Line during the prewar years along the Franco-German border. OT was the chief engineering group responsible for the design and construction of the wall's major gun emplacements and fortifications.

The OT supplied supervisors and labour as well as organising supplies, machinery and transport to supplement the staff and equipment of construction companies. Many of them were German, however construction companies in occupied countries bid for contracts. Companies could apply for OT work or could be conscripted. Companies failing to complete their work on time, which was always possible as the OT controlled the material and manpower of each firm, could find themselves closed down, or more likely fined, or taken over or merged with another firm to make a more efficient larger unit. Successful firms however could make attractive profits.

The OT obtained quotes for necessary works and signed contracts with each construction company setting out the price and terms of the contract, such as bonus payments for efficiency, including the wage rates and bonus payments for OT workers (which depended on their nationality and skill). There could be several construction companies working on each site.

Labour comprised skilled volunteers, engineers, designers and supervisors, who were paid and treated well. Second came volunteer workers, often skilled technicians, such as carpenters, plumbers, electricians and metal workers. Again, these workers were paid, took holidays and were well treated. Next came unskilled forced labour, paid very little and treated quite harshly. Lastly came effective slave labour, paid little, badly fed and treated very harshly. The OT ran training courses to improve labour skills.

Massive numbers of workers were needed. The Vichy regime imposed a compulsory labour system, drafting some 600,000 French workers to construct these permanent fortifications along the Dutch, Belgian, and French coasts facing the English Channel. Efficiency of the OT decreased in late 1943 and 1944 as a result of manpower pressures, fuel shortages and the bombing of worksites, such as V-weapons sites, where some volunteer workers refused to work in such dangerous areas.

OT Cherbourg in January 1944 dealt with 34 companies with 15,000 workers and 79 sub contractors. Daily, weekly and monthly reports showing progress, work variations, material used, stocks of material, labour hours used per skill type, the weather, equipment inventory and quality, level of supervision, employee absences, staffing levels, deaths and problems experienced all had to be filed with the OT.

=== British attacks ===
Throughout most of 1942–43, the Atlantic Wall remained a relaxed front for the Axis troops manning it, with only two large-scale British attacks. Operation Chariot, launched near St Nazaire in March 1942, successfully destroyed German pumping machinery for, and severely damaged, the Normandie dry dock and installations. The second attack was the Dieppe Raid, launched near the French port of Dieppe in August 1942 to test the German defences and provide combat experience for Canadian troops. The Germans were defeated at St. Nazaire, but had little difficulty in repulsing the attack at Dieppe, where they inflicted heavy casualties. Although the Dieppe raid was a disaster for the Allies, it alarmed Hitler, who was sure an Allied invasion in the West would shortly follow. Following Dieppe, Hitler gave Field Marshal Gerd von Rundstedt, the overall German Commander-in-Chief in the West, 15 further divisions to shore up the German positions.

=== Reorganisation ===
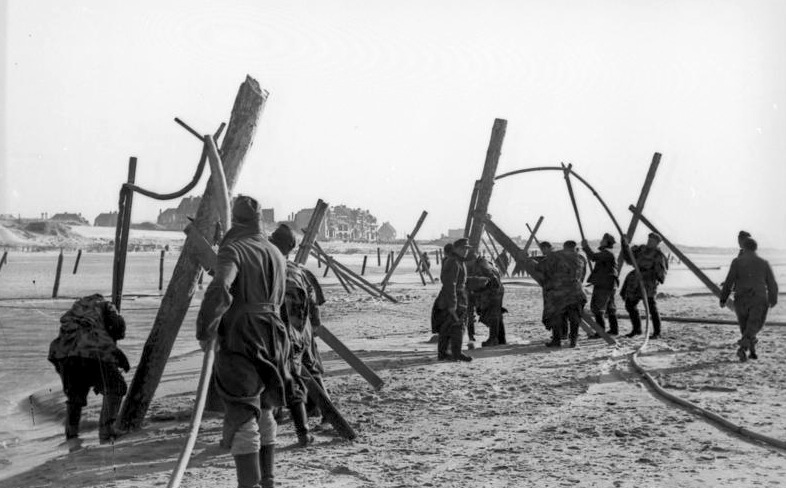
German soldiers placing landing craft obstructions, 1943

Early in 1944, with an Allied invasion of Nazi-occupied Europe becoming ever more likely, Field Marshal Erwin Rommel was assigned to improve the wall's defences. Believing the existing coastal fortifications to be entirely inadequate, he immediately began strengthening them. Rommel's main concern was Allied air power. He had seen it first-hand when fighting the British and Americans in North Africa, and it had left a profound impression on him. He feared that any German counterattack would be broken up by Allied aircraft long before it could make a difference. Under his direction, hundreds of reinforced concrete pillboxes were built on the beaches, or sometimes slightly inland, to house machine guns, antitank guns, and light and heavy artillery. Land mines and antitank obstacles were planted on the beaches, and underwater obstacles and naval mines were placed in waters just offshore. Little known was that touch sensitive mines were placed atop the beach obstacles. The intent was to destroy the Allied landing craft before they could unload on the beaches.

=== D-Day ===
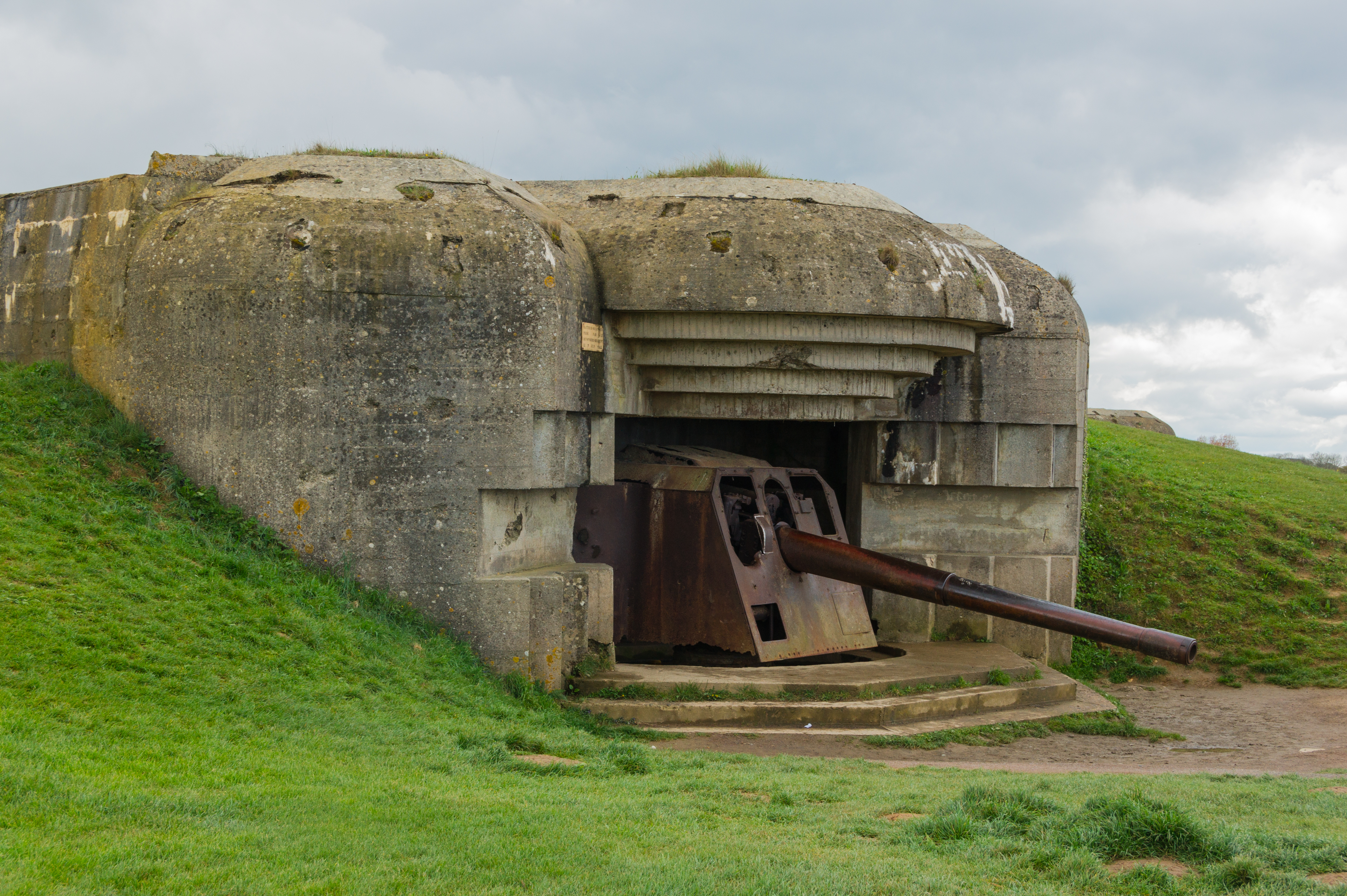
One of the casemates of the Longues-sur-Mer battery in Normandy, destroyed by naval gunfire during the Allied landings

By the time of the Allied invasion, the Germans had laid almost six million mines in Northern France. More gun emplacements and minefields extended inland along roads leading away from the beaches. In likely landing spots for gliders and parachutists, the Germans emplanted slanted poles with sharpened tops, which the troops called Rommelspargel ("Rommel's Asparagus"). Low-lying river and estuarine areas were intentionally flooded. Rommel believed that Germany would inevitably be defeated unless the invasion could be stopped on the beach, declaring, "It is absolutely necessary that we push the British and Americans back from the beaches. Afterwards it will be too late; the first 24 hours of the invasion will be decisive."

== Channel Islands ==
The Channel Islands were heavily fortified, particularly the island of Alderney, which is closest to Britain. Hitler had decreed that one-twelfth of the steel and concrete used in the Atlantic Wall should go to the Channel Islands, because of the propaganda value of controlling British territory. The islands were some of the most densely fortified areas in Europe, with a host of Hohlgangsanlage tunnels, casemates, and coastal artillery positions.

However, the Channel Islands lacked strategic significance and the Allies bypassed them when they invaded Normandy. As a result, the German garrisons stationed on the islands did not surrender until 9 May 1945—one day after Victory in Europe Day. The garrison on Alderney did not surrender until 16 May. As most of the German garrisons surrendered peacefully, the Channel Islands are host to some of the best-preserved Atlantic Wall sites.

The commander in Guernsey produced books giving detailed pictures, plans and descriptions of the fortifications in the island, Festung Guernsey.

== Fortresses ==
Many major ports and positions were incorporated into the Atlantic Wall, receiving heavy fortifications. Hitler ordered all positions to fight to the end, and some of them remained in German hands until Germany's unconditional surrender. Several of the port fortresses were resupplied by submarines after being surrounded by Allied Forces. The defenders of these positions included foreign volunteers and Waffen-SS troops.

Location	Commander	Garrison strength	Notes	Surrender	Ref.
Alderney	Maximilian List	3,200	Fortifications of Alderney	16 May 1945	
Antwerp	Gustav-Adolf von Zangen	90,000	Battle of the Scheldt	8 November 1944	
Boulogne	Ferdinand Heim	10,000	Operation Wellhit	22 September 1944	
Brest	Hermann-Bernhard Ramcke	38,000	Battle for Brest	19 September 1944	
Calais/Cap Gris-Nez	Ludwig Schroeder	7,500	Operation Undergo	30 September 1944	
Cherbourg	Karl-Wilhelm von Schlieben	47,000	Battle of Cherbourg	27 June 1944	
Dunkirk	Friedrich Frisius	12,000	Allied siege of Dunkirk	8 May 1945	
Guernsey	Rudolf Graf von Schmettow then Friedrich Hüffmeier	11,700	German fortification of Guernsey	9 May 1945	
Jersey	Rudolf Graf von Schmettow then Friedrich Hüffmeier	11,600	German occupation of the Channel Islands; Liberation of the German-occupied Channel Islands	9 May 1945	
La Rochelle/La Pallice	Ernst Schirlitz	11,500	Allied siege of La Rochelle	9 May 1945	
Le Havre	Hermann-Eberhard Wildermuth	14,000	Operation Astonia	12 September 1944	
Le Verdon-sur-Mer	Otto Prahl	3,500	—	20 April 1945	
Lorient	Wilhelm Fahrmbacher	25,000	—	10 May 1945	
Ostend	Erich Julius Mülbe	60,000	—	7 September 1944	
Royan	Hans Michahelles	5,000	—	17 April 1945	
Saint-Malo/Dinard	Andreas von Aulock	12,000	—	17 August 1944	
St. Nazaire	Hans Junck	35,000	—	11 May 1945	
Zeebrugge	Knut Eberding	14,000	—	1 November 1944	

== Preservation ==
=== France ===
Many French construction companies benefited financially from helping construct the Atlantic Wall; these companies were not penalised during the post war period.

Immediately after the war, there was little interest in preserving the wall due to the negative memories associated with the Nazi occupation. Some of the beach fortifications have toppled or are underwater, while those farther inland still exist mainly due to their location.

One of the best preserved parts is the Todt Battery. In 2011, renewed efforts to preserve the wall were spearheaded by organisations in Germany, the Netherlands, and the United Kingdom. The question has been raised over whether France should declare the wall a National Monument to ensure it is preserved; however no government so far has envisaged this.

=== Elsewhere ===
Although the defensive wall was never fully completed, many bunkers still exist near Ostend, Channel Islands, on Walcheren, near Scheveningen, The Hague, Katwijk, Noordwijk, IJmuiden, Den Helder, and in Scandinavia (Denmark and Norway specifically).

== See also ==
- British anti-invasion preparations of the Second World War
- Czechoslovak border fortifications
- Continental System, Napoleon's blockade of the British Empire
- Siegfried line
- Maginot line
- Mareth line

== Sources ==
=== Printed ===
- Ambrose, Stephen (1994). D-Day, June 6, 1944: The Climactic Battle Of World War II. Simon & Schuster. ISBN 0-671-67334-3.
- Darman, Peter (2012). The Allied Invasion of Europe. Rosen Publishing Group. ISBN 978-1-4488-9234-1.
- Delaforce, Patrick (2005). Smashing The Atlantic Wall: The Destruction of Hitler's Coastal Fortresses. Casemate Publishers. ISBN 978-1-84415-256-8.
- Hakim, Joy (1995). A History of Us: War, Peace And All That Jazz. Oxford University. ISBN 0-19-509514-6.
- Hastings, Max (2004). Armageddon: The Battle for Germany 1944–45. Macmillan. ISBN 0-333-90836-8.
- Kaufmann, J. E.; Robert, Jurga (2003). Fortress Third Reich: German Fortifications And Defense Systems in World War II. Da Capo Press. ISBN 0-306-81239-8.
- McNab, Chris (2014). Hitler's Fortresses: German Fortifications And Defences 1939–45. Osprey Publishing. ISBN 978-1-78200-828-6.
- Mountbatten, Chris (2007). Combined Operations: The Official Story of the Commandos. Read Books. ISBN 978-1-4067-5957-0.
- Pauls, Michael; Facaros, Dana (2007). Cadogan Guide Dordogne, the Lot & Bordeaux. New Holland Publishers. ISBN 978-1-86011-354-3.
- Saunders, Anthony (2001). Hitler's Atlantic Wall: Fortress Europe. University of Michigan. ISBN 978-0-7509-4554-7.
- Stephenson, Charles; Taylor, Chris (2013). The Channel Islands 1941–45: Hitler's Impregnable Fortress. Osprey Publishing. ISBN 978-1-4728-0375-7.
- Williamson, Louis (2012). U-Boat Bases And Bunkers 1941–45. Osprey Publishing. ISBN 978-1-78200-002-0.
- Williams, Paul (2013). Hitler's Atlantic Wall: Pas De Calais. Casemate Publishers. ISBN 978-1-84884-817-7.
- Zuehlke, Mark (2009). Terrible Victory: First Canadian Army And The Scheldt Estuary Campaign: September 13 – November 6, 1944. D & M Publishers. ISBN 978-1-926685-80-9.

=== Online ===
- "Assault Plan". United States Army Center of Military History. Archived from the original on 5 January 2008.
- Schofield, Hugh (13 September 2011). "Hitler's Atlantic Wall: Should France Preserve It?". British Broadcasting Corporation.
- "Jersey – My Island – History – German Occupation". British Broadcasting Corporation.

=== Media ===
- Lightning War (television documentary). United States: World Media Rights. 2009. Archived from the original on 2 April 2015.
- The Great Landings (television documentary). France: France 2. 2009.
- Overlord (television documentary). United States: World Media Rights. 2009. Archived from the original on 2 April 2015.
- The Atlantic Wall and its significance in Allied planning for the D-Day landings are featured in the novel Villa Normandie (Endeavour Press, 2015) by Kevin Doherty.
- The many constructions of the Wall still standing have been photographed by Jonathan Andrew and Stephan Vanfleteren.
