= Atlantic Wall open-air museum =

Atlantic Wall Open Air Museum
- Openluchtmuseum Atlantikwall
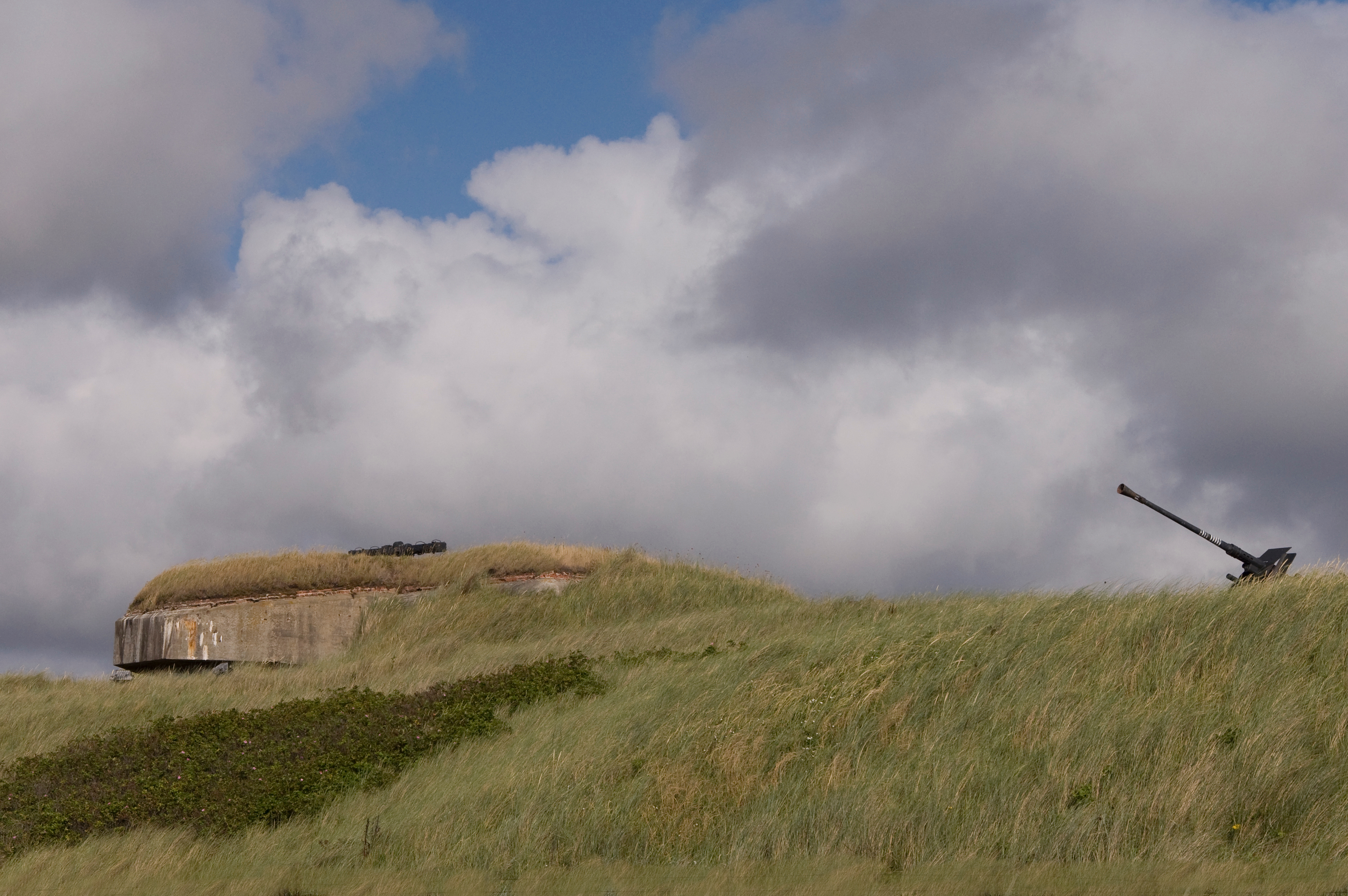
- Preserved Observation Post at the Museum.

- Location within Belgium
- Location: Raversijde, West Flanders, Belgium
- Coordinates: 51.200989°N 2.846373°E
- Type: Military Museum
- Owner: Domein Raversijde
- Parking: On site
- Website: www.west-vlaanderen.be

The Atlantic Wall Open Air Museum (Dutch: Openluchtmuseum Atlantikwall) is a military museum near Ostend in Belgium which preserves fortifications of the Atlantic Wall dating to the First and Second World Wars. The section of fortifications owned by the museum - over 60 bunkers and two miles of trenches - is among the best preserved sections of the defensive line in Europe. The fortifications survive because they were built on land belonging to Prince Charles, Count of Flanders who decided that they should not be destroyed after the war, but be kept as a national monument.

== The Museum ==
During the German occupation of Belgium in World War I, the Aachen Battery was built to defend nearby Ostend on the land which forms part of the museum. Though it is not as well preserved as the later fortifications, it is one of the rare coastal defence fortifications that survive from this period.

The majority of the preserved bunkers and trenches at the site date to the construction of the Atlantic Wall during the second German occupation during World War II. Numerous bunkers, gun emplacements and trenches were built on the site, including the well preserved Saltzwedel neu Battery. Several of the fortifications have been renovated to their wartime condition and the museums also displays uniforms and equipment used by the garrison.

== Gallery ==
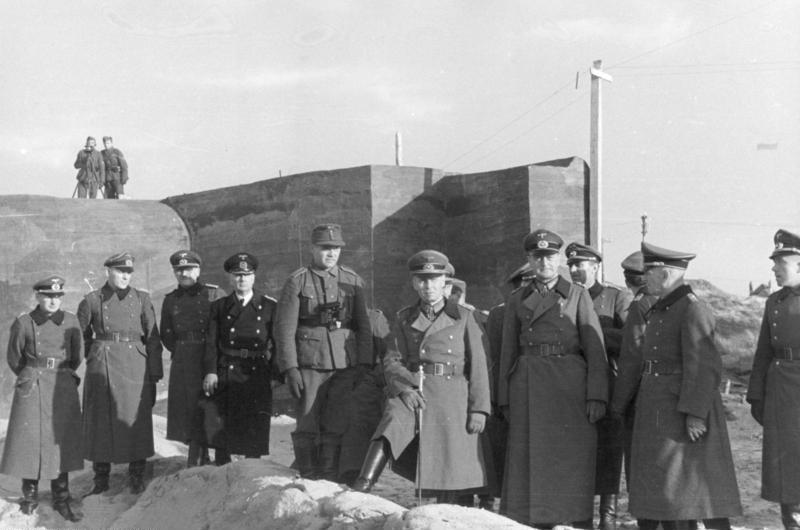
Rommel and his staff inspecting the Raversijde section of the Wall.

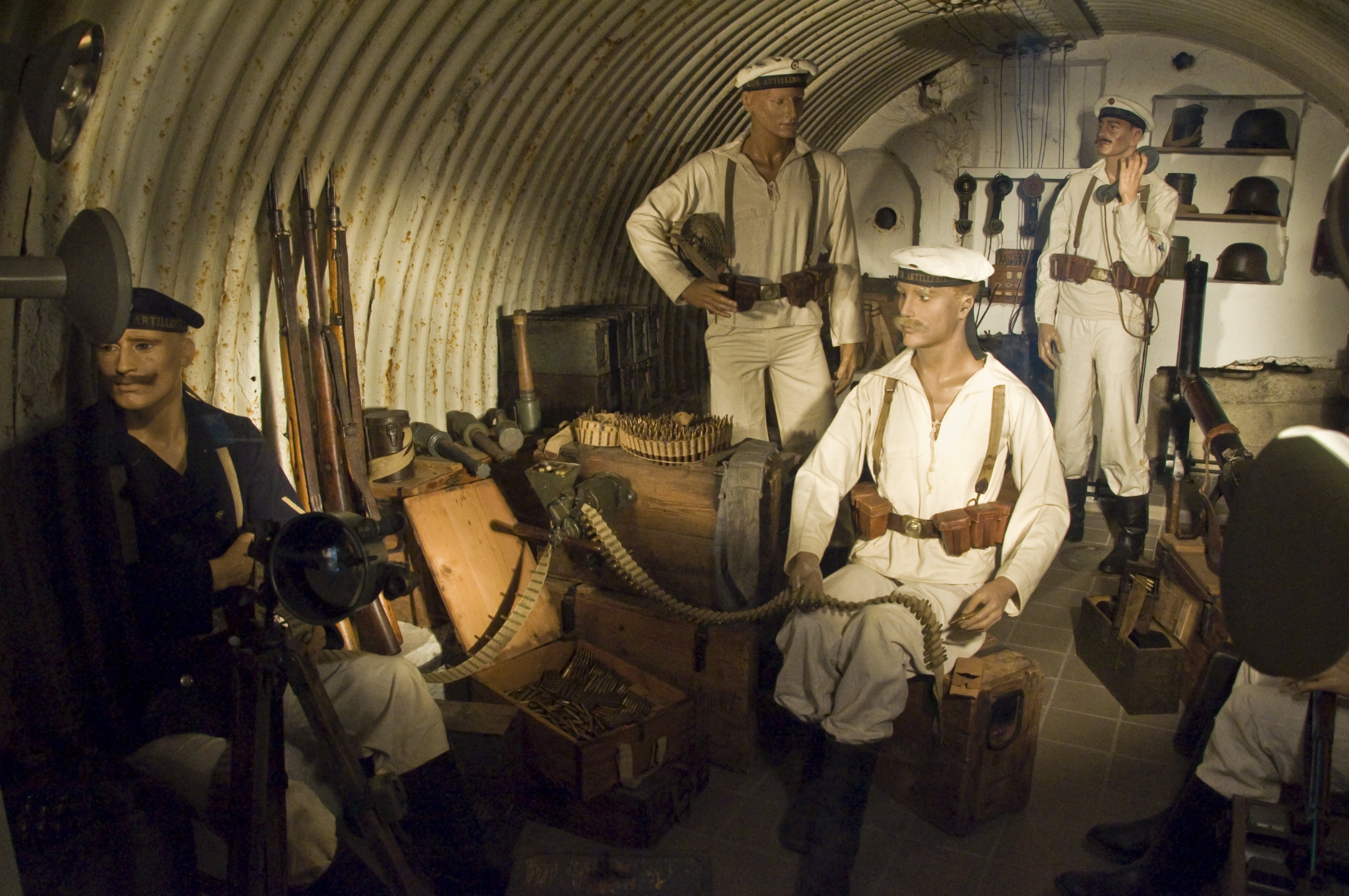
Display of First World War German equipment and uniforms in one of the shelters in the Aachen Battery

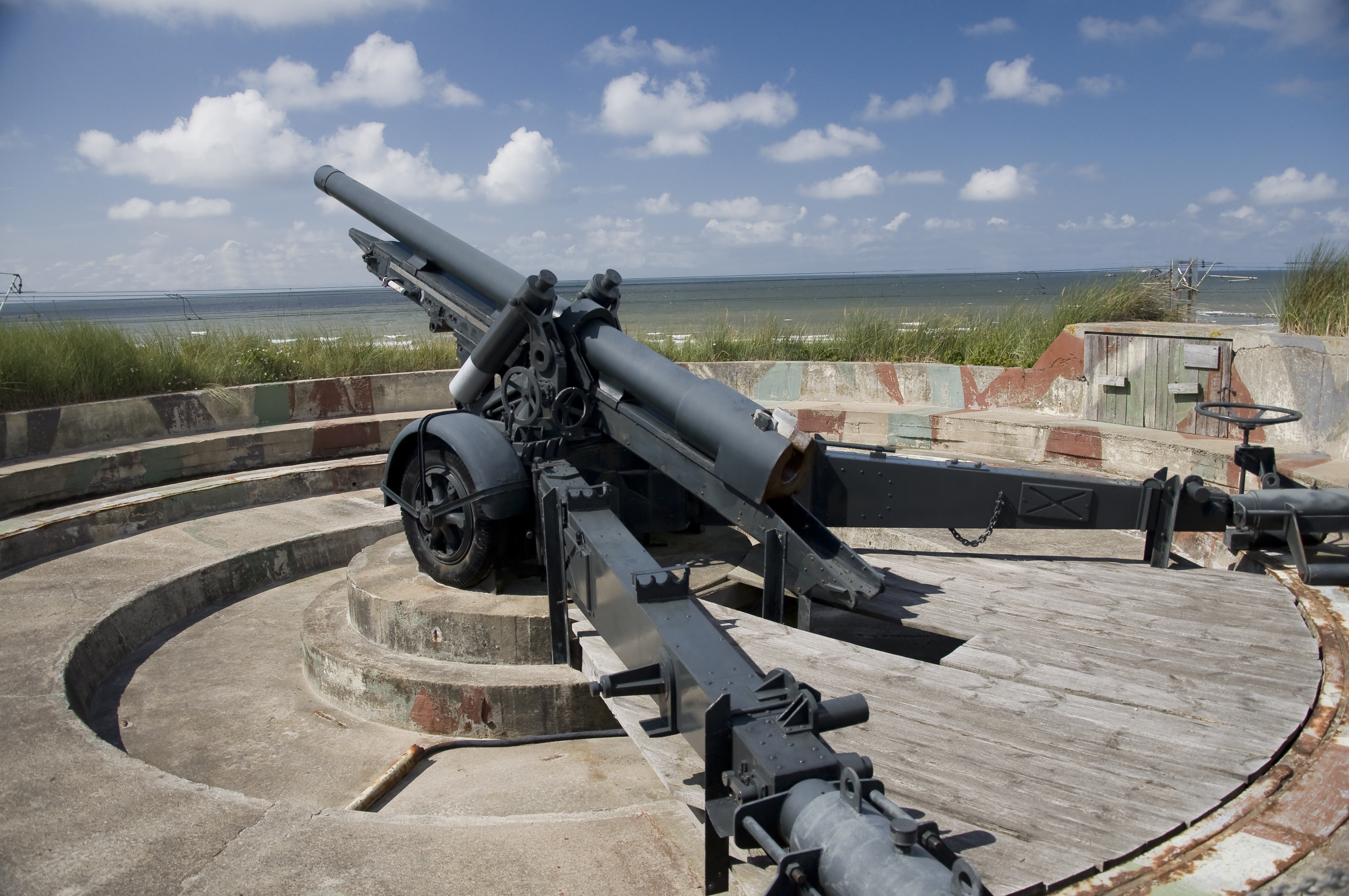
A replica captured Belgian Army 120 mm gun used as a battery gun in a dedicated circular parapet.

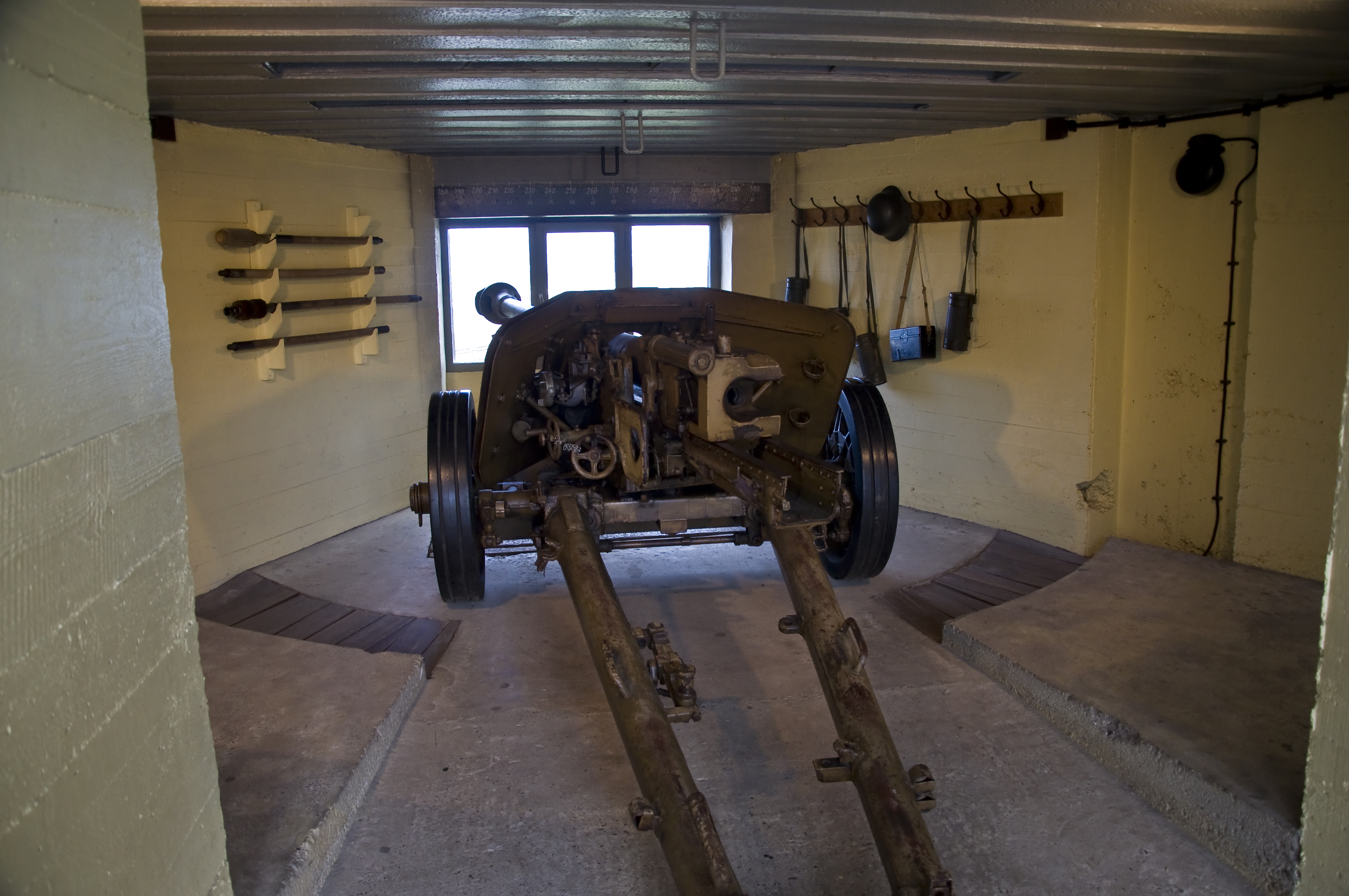
PAK 40 anti-tank gun inside a restored bunker

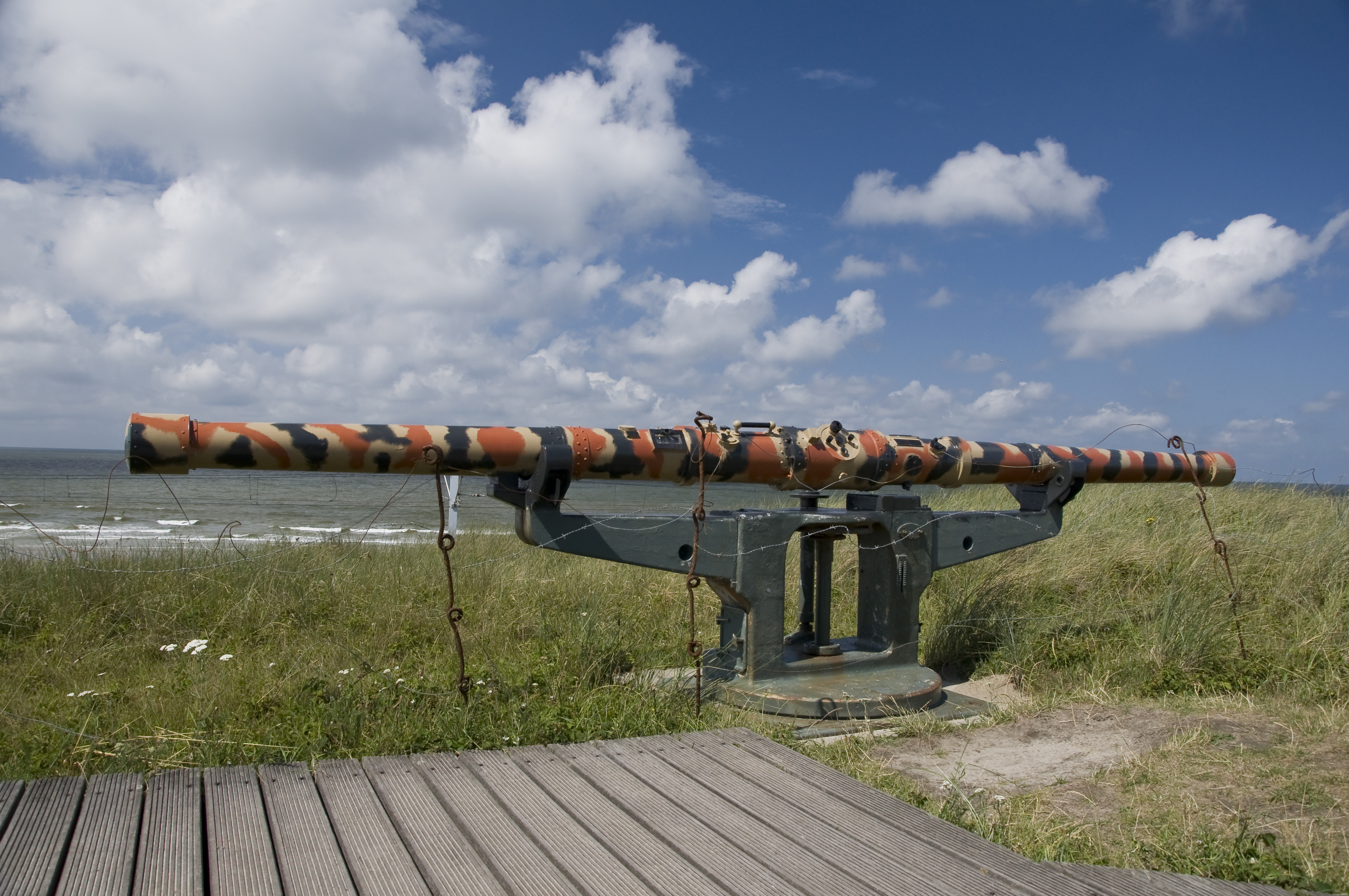
Mounted rangefinder.
