= Canon de 120mm L mle 1931 =

Canon de 12 cm L mle 1931
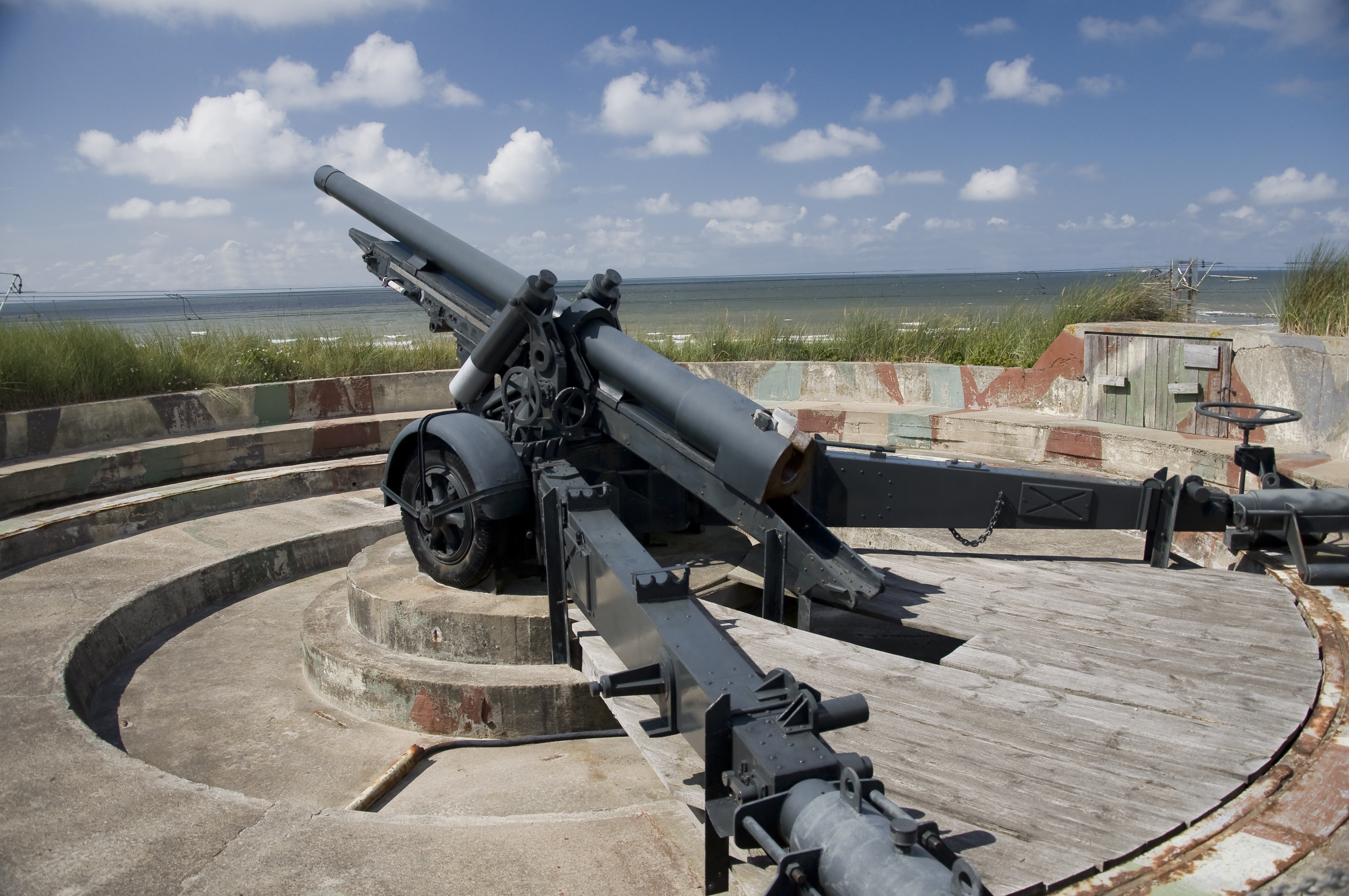
- In the Atlantic Wall Open Air Museum
- Type: medium field gun
- Place of origin: Belgium

Service history
- In service: 1934 – c. 1950
- Used by: Belgium; Nazi Germany; Norway
- Wars: World War II

Production history
- Designer: Cockerill
- Manufacturer: Cockerill
- No. built: 48

Specifications
- Mass: 5,450 kilograms (12,020 lb)
- Barrel length: 4.426 metres (14.52 ft) L/37
- Shell: 21.93 kilograms (48.3 lb)
- Caliber: 120 mm (4.72 in)
- Carriage: Split trail
- Elevation: 0° to +38° 30'
- Traverse: 60°
- Rate of fire: 1 rpm
- Muzzle velocity: 760 m/s (2,493 ft/s)
- Maximum firing range: 17,500 metres (19,100 yd)

The Canon de 12 cm L mle 1931 was a medium field gun made and used by Belgium in World War II. Captured guns were taken into Wehrmacht service after the surrender of Belgium in May 1940 as the 12 cm K 370(b) where it was generally used on coast defense duties.

It was rather heavy for its size, but had a good range. The split trail had large spades that had to be pounded into the ground to anchor the weapon in place.

== See also ==
- BL 4.5 inch
- 122 mm gun M1931 (A-19)
