= Hohlgangsanlage tunnels, Jersey =

WW2 German fortifications on Jersey

Hohlgangsanlagen
- German Tunnels
- Part of Atlantic Wall
- Jersey
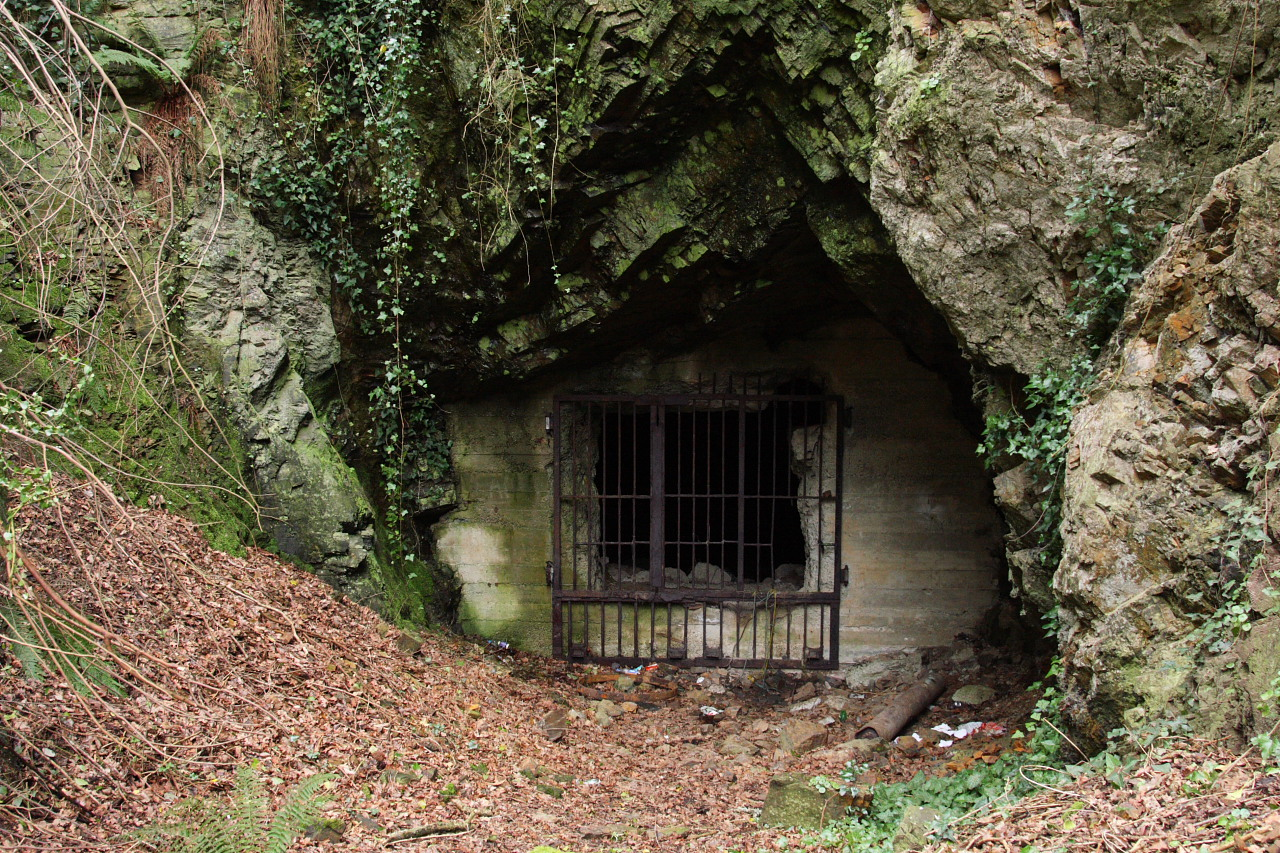
- The northernmost entrance to Ho2 in St. Peter

- Flag of the German occupying forces

Site information
- Owner: Owner of land above tunnel
- Controlled by: States & private ownership
- Open to the public: One open to the public, others can be visited with land owners permission.
- Condition: One fully restored, others maintained, most abandoned

Site history
- Built: 1941–1945
- Built by: Festungsbaubataillone, 4/Gesteinsbohr-Kompanie Btl. 77, Reichsarbeitsdienst, Organisation Todt, various contractors German and local
- Materials: Concrete, steel, and timber
- Demolished: Some (by both Germans and British)
- Events: German occupation of the Channel Islands

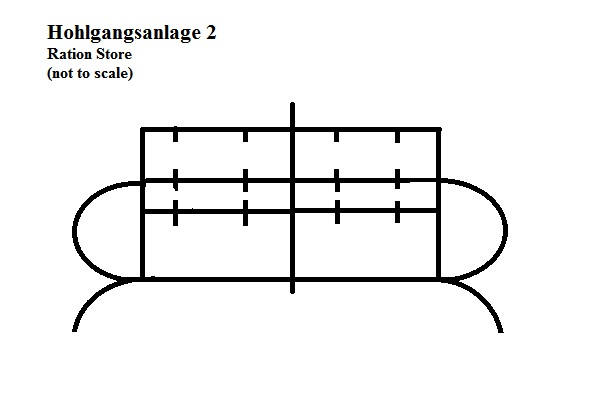
Plan of Ho2, a ration store. Tunnels were built to similar designs depending on their intended use

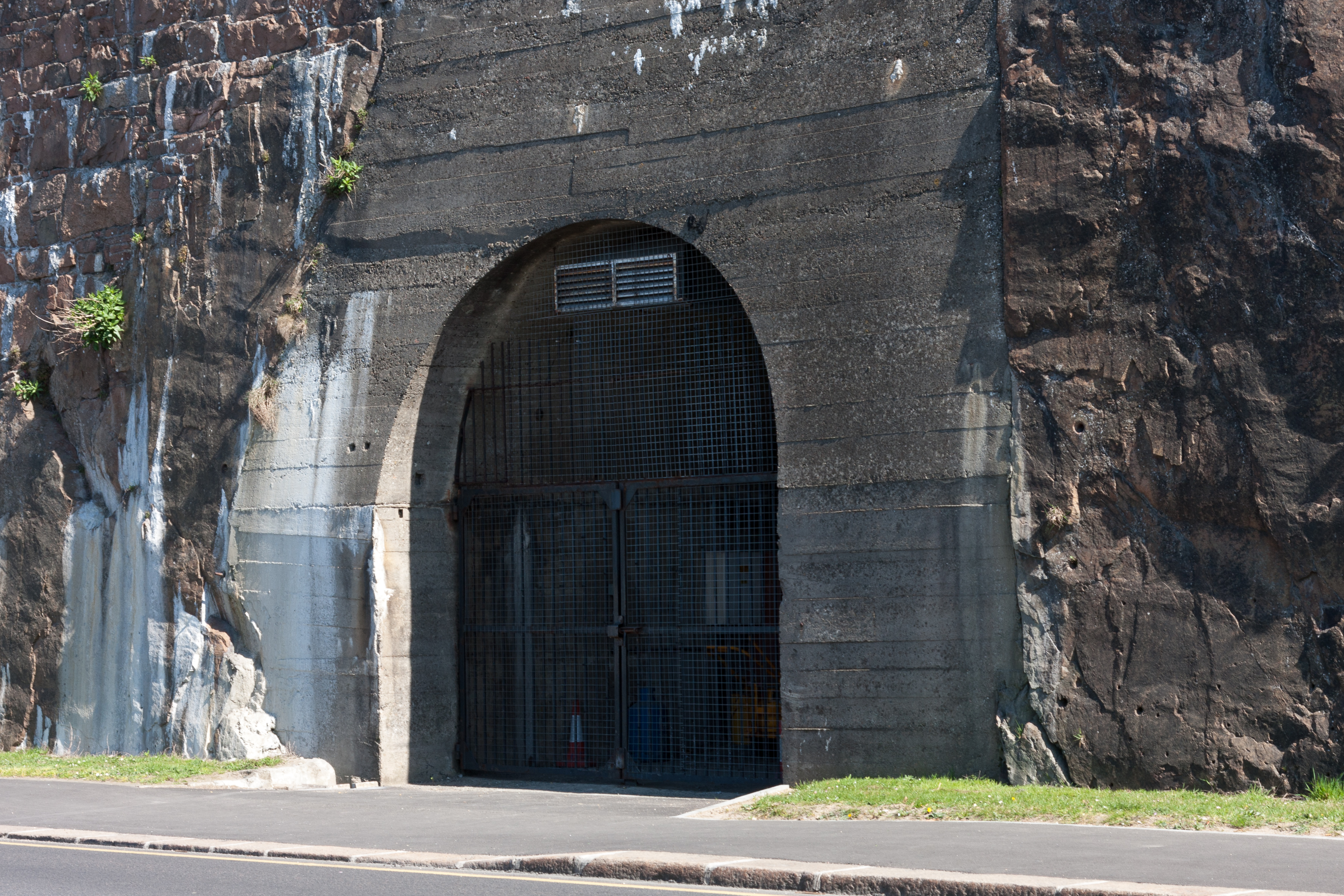
The entrance to Ho19

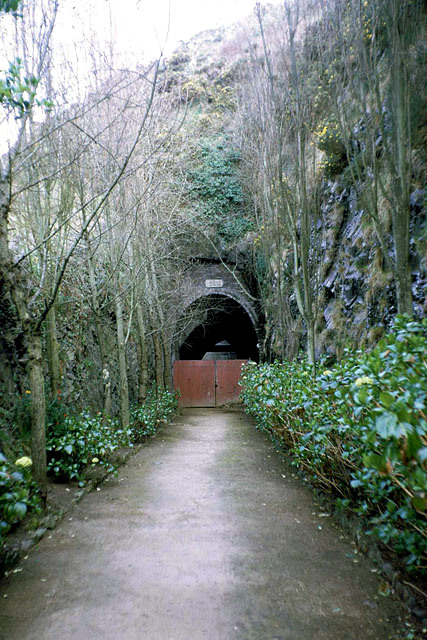
This rail tunnel formed the entrance to Ho5

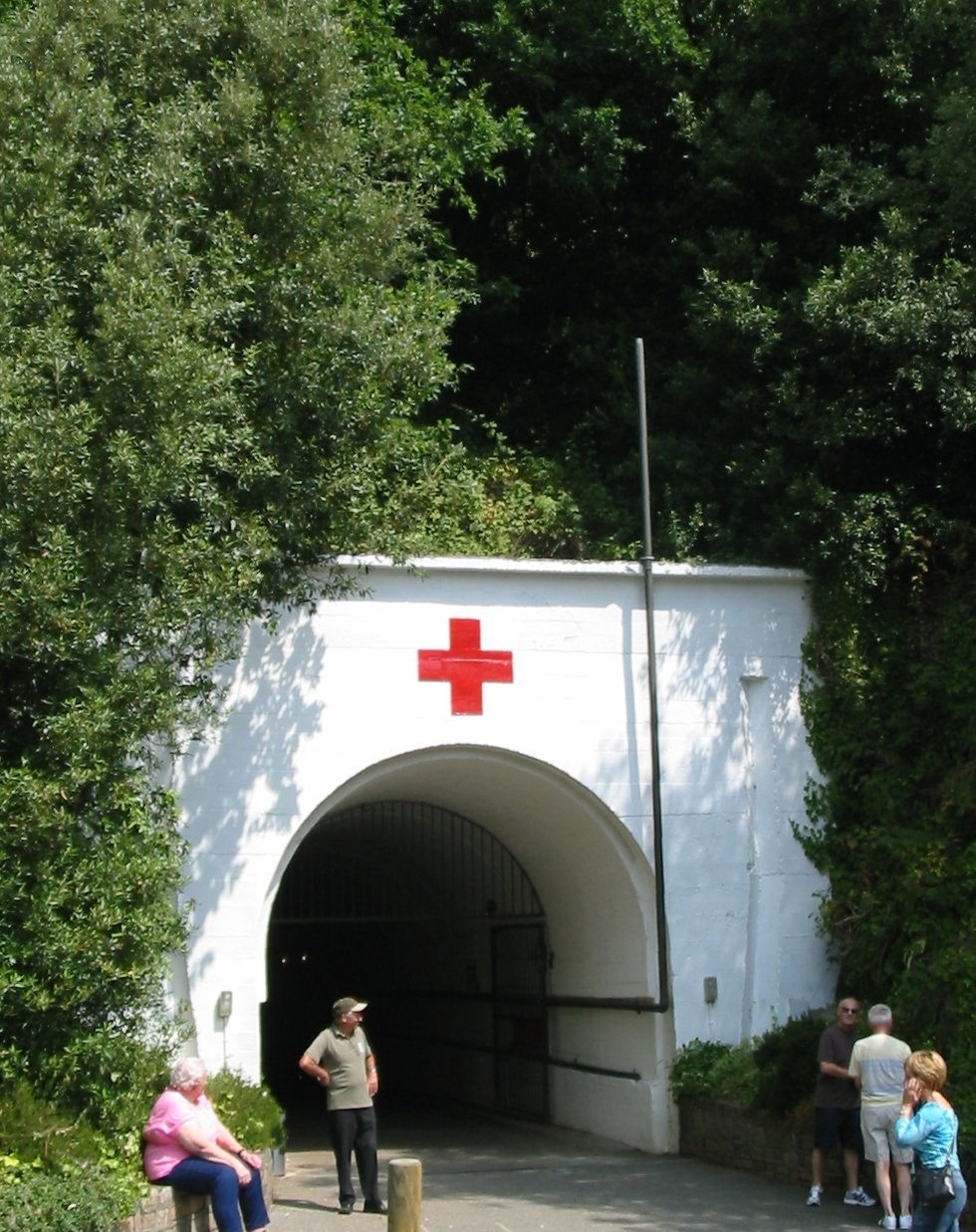
The main entrance of Ho8

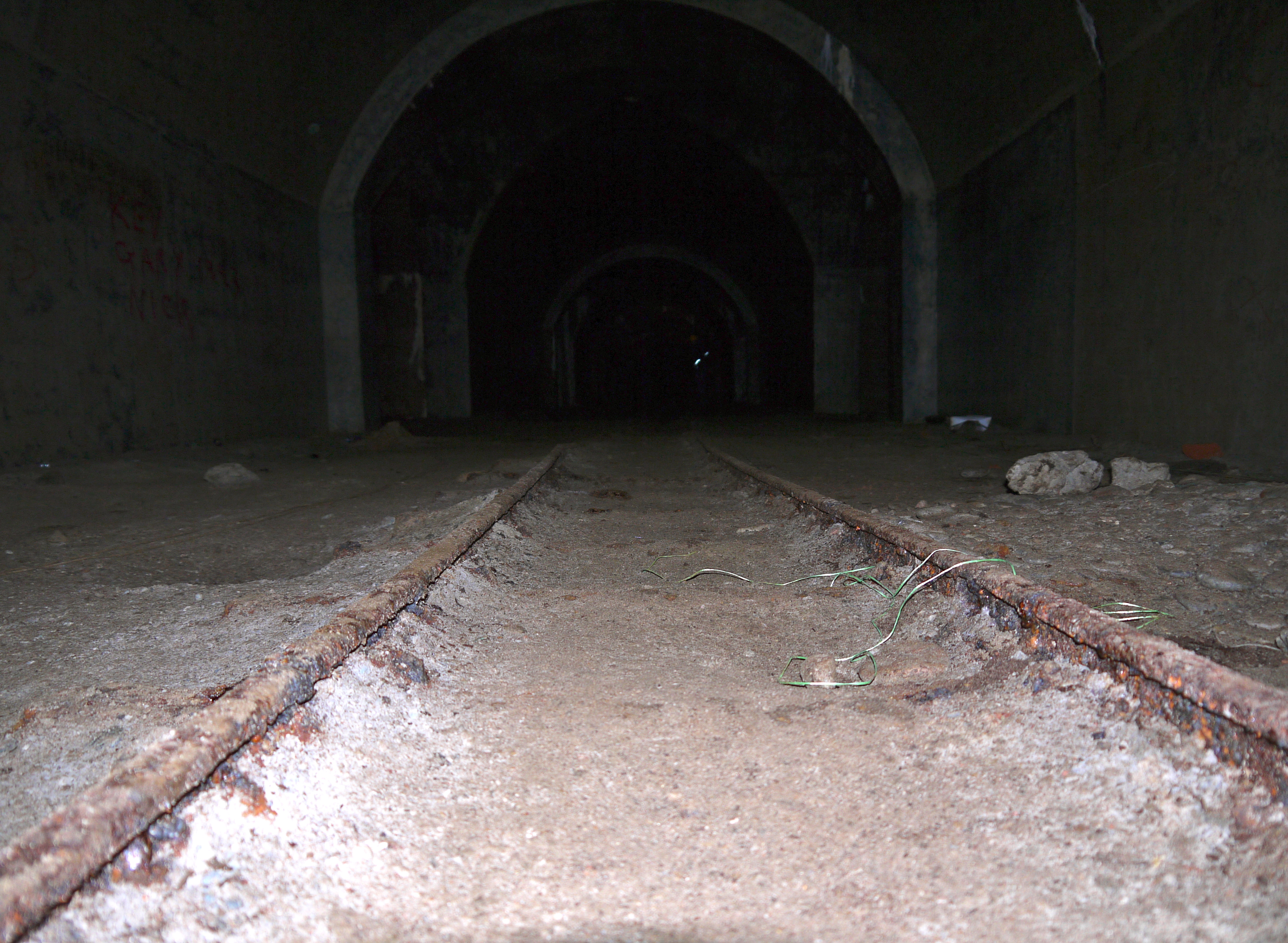
Central section of Ho2

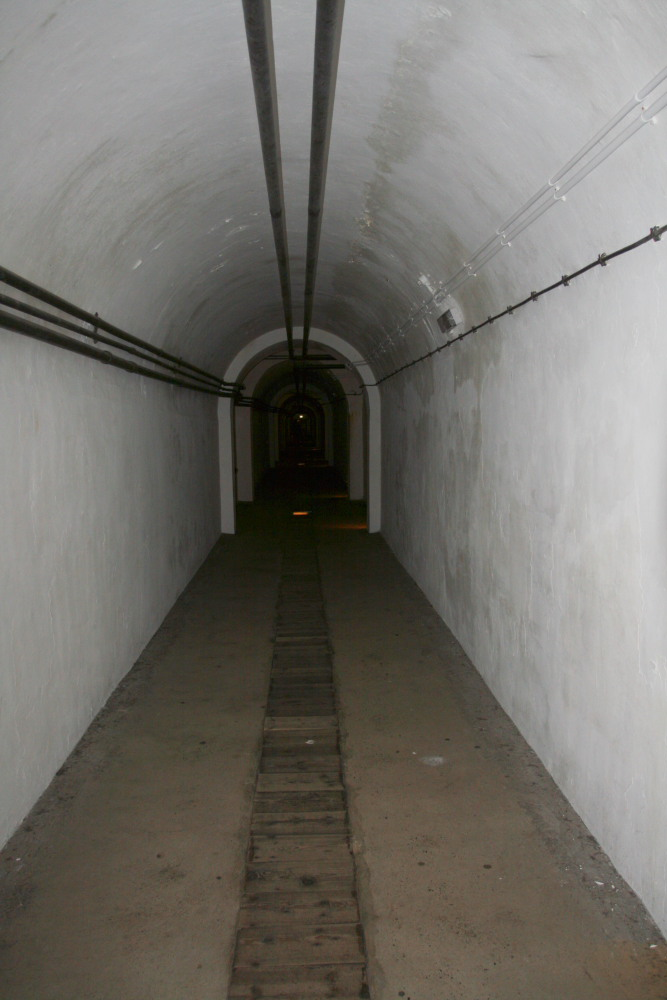
A tunnel in Ho8

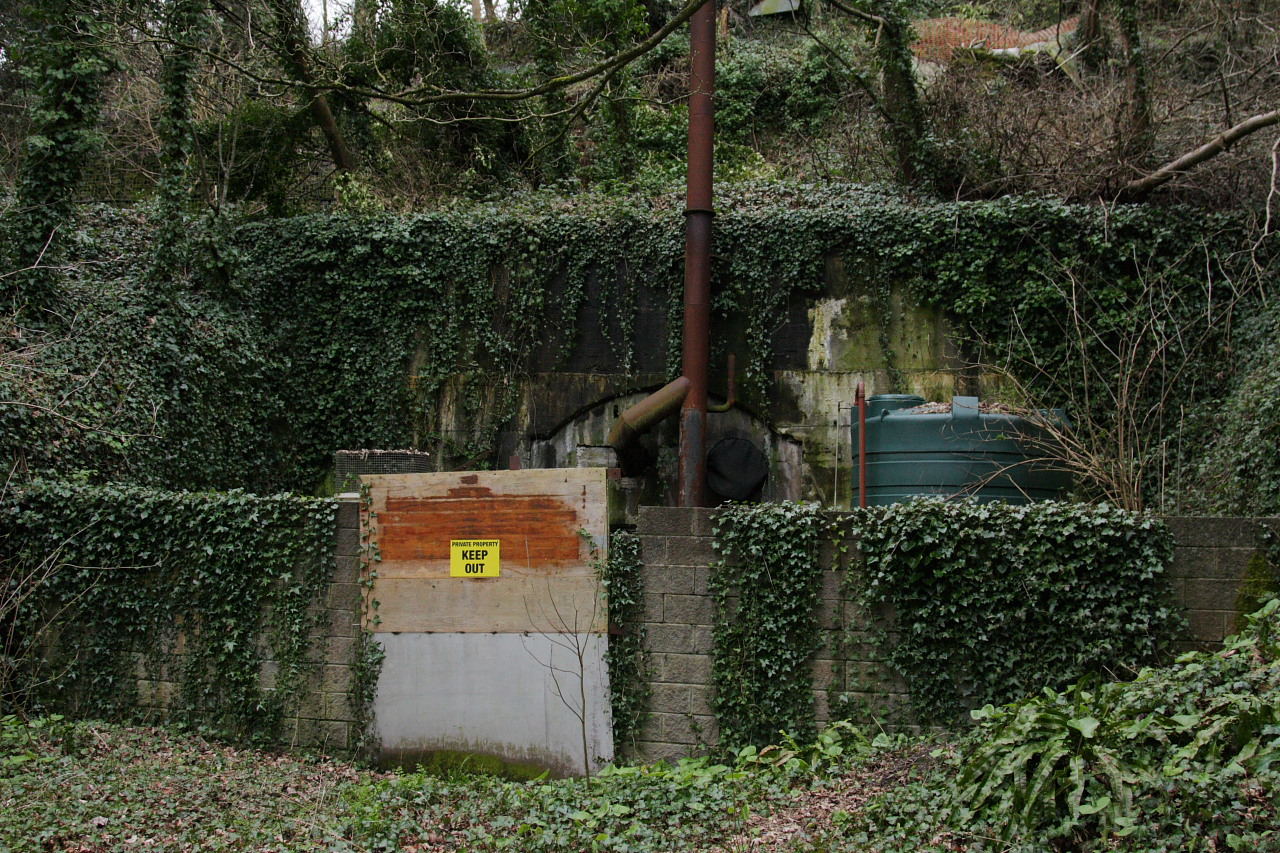
One of the entrances to Ho1, a privately owned tunnel

Hohlgangsanlage are a number of tunnels constructed in Jersey by occupying German forces during the occupation of Jersey. The Germans intended these bunkers to protect troops and equipment from aerial bombing and to act as fortifications in their own right.

The word Hohlgangsanlage can be translated as "cave passage installations". The Channel Island tunnels are the only ones on the Atlantic wall to be referred to as Hohlgangsanlagen.

All the tunnels except for Ho5 are incomplete, and some never progressed beyond planning. The partly complete tunnels are, nonetheless, substantial in size. Completed sections were used for various purposes such as storage.

In 1944, when construction stopped, 244,000 m^{3} of rock had been extracted for tunnel digging collectively from Guernsey, Jersey and Alderney (the majority from Jersey). At the same point in 1944, the entire Atlantic Wall from Norway to the Franco-Spanish border, excluding the Channel Islands, had extracted some 225,000 m^{3}.

== History 1941–present day ==
Tunnel construction began in 1941, shortly before Hitler's October 1941 decree that the islands be defended. The tunnels were constructed at strategic points around the island. Most of the tunnels were for shelter or storage, but some were used as part of and to link fortifications in strong points (such as at Corbière) and were part of casemates. The tunnels were constructed by the Festungsbaubataillone (fortress construction battalions), 4/Gesteinsbohr-Kompanie Btl. 77 (specialist mining battalion), the RAD (state labour for 17- and 18-year-olds) and the Organisation Todt. The Germans used a variety of labour sources, most being forced. After Todt's death in February 1942, Albert Speer drastically reduced the resources available for the construction of tunnels on the island. During 1944, there was a shortage of raw materials, so effort was diverted to finish only the most complete tunnels. On 9 May 1945, construction stopped with the liberation of Jersey.

Only a few tunnels were actually used by the Germans: Ho1, Ho4, Ho5, and Ho8; of these, only one was actually completed (Ho5) and the others were used while partially completed with unfinished galleries being walled off, or left with pit props in place.

Immediately after the war, the British used the tunnels: soon after the Liberation of the Channel Islands, some military equipment was moved and stored in the tunnels. For example, Ho1 stored weapons, Ho2 stored small equipment such as helmets, gas masks, fuel, oxyacetylene, and field kitchens. Ho13 stored Panzer Abteilung 213's Char B1 bis tanks.

During the 1950s scrap metal drive, the tunnels were mostly cleared and sealed. Under Jersey law, a landowner owns everything beneath his land, down to the centre of the earth, so all the tunnels are privately owned. Hohlgangsanlage 8 is the only tunnel open to the public without special permission from the land owner; it was opened to the public in 1946 by the British army, then gifted to the States of Jersey by the War Department. After a lawsuit by the owners of the land above, it became privately owned but still operates as a museum today.

After 1962, all the tunnels were thoroughly cleared of German equipment (apart from the museum, Ho1 due to roof collapse and Ho4 due to masses of barbed wire, roof collapses and unexploded ordnance) after a tragedy in which two souvenir hunters died of carbon monoxide poisoning in Ho2.

The tunnels are very unstable, as most were bored not into solid granite, but loose shale. This is evident from the large number of roof collapses in the incomplete, unlined tunnels. Most of the tunnels still survive today, and are infrequently visited by organised parties (with permission).

There were plans to use some of the tunnels during the 2009 Swine flu pandemic, which ultimately never materialised.

== Construction and design ==
The tunnels were dug into the sides of hills, into rock. This means that incomplete tunnels remain mostly intact, due to the strength of the unsupported rock. Completed sections are lined with concrete floors, walls, and ceilings.

There was a basic design of storage and personnel tunnel. Storage tunnels incorporated a 600-millimetre (24 in) gauge railway in a loop running around the whole complex and a small platform for loading supplies; they usually had two entrances so that vehicles could continuously enter and exit the complex. Personnel tunnels were built like a grid; the railway was often removed after construction was complete. Completed tunnels would have been lined in concrete, and have drainage, lighting, and air conditioning systems.

In all, 19–25 storage tunnels were planned but, due to the almost wholesale destruction of primary source material before the surrender, the exact number is unknown (although the number where work began is known).

Where possible, the tunnel routes avoided granite and instead they were routed through looser shale rock formations; this speeded up construction and was less labour-intensive, but it could also be dangerous due to an increased risk of rockfalls. The tunnels were dug by the traditional method of drilling and blasting. When the tunnels were bored out, they were lined with concrete. First, the floor was lined, followed by the walls, and, finally, the roof. The walls were concreted using wooden shuttering, the space between the shuttering and the rock face was filled with concrete, and the shuttering subsequently removed. The roof was made in the same way, but using curved shuttering balancing on the concrete walls. Concrete was poured down the escape shafts rather than through the tunnel entrances to avoid contamination with the rock leaving the tunnel; these chutes can still be seen in many of the tunnels.

Contrary to popular belief, there were relatively few accidents and deaths in the building programme itself, but many slave labourers died of starvation.

== The tunnels ==
=== Storage tunnels ===
Tunnels used only for storage

- Ho1 (Munitions Store I) – Incomplete, dangerous and private - West side of La Route d'Aleva (The German Road), St. Peter's Valley. Ho1 unfortunately, was never completed. That being said, construction was sufficiently advanced to permit the storage of ammunition from May 1944. By the end of the war, some 6,000 tons of ammunition had been housed within this complex. Had it been finished, the British Army estimated that the tunnel could have held up to 20,000 tons worth of ammunition. By the end of 1945, the ammunition had been removed for disposal. The British Army did however see Ho1 as a suitable place to dump German equipment, instead of dumping into the sea. Future archaeologists and adventurists would be left disappointed as scrap metal has its price in 1953. A major scrap metal hunt lead to most items being removed. In more recent years, the tunnel has been used for various reasons. Providing winter storage for laid up hire cars and coaches, while some galleries were used by the local rifle club. Subsequently, for many years, the tunnel was primarily used as a mushroom farm. A victim of rising costs, the mushroom farm ceased operations in 2006. Within one of the primary tunnelling sections, as of 2025, remains an old Allied Jeep that has remained since 1946.
- Ho2 (Ration Store I) – Incomplete, dangerous and private – East side of The German Road, St. Peters Valley. Like Ho1, this tunnel was constructed with multiple entrances and semi-circular primary galleries and indeed could be said to be a mirror image of its neighbour tunnel just across the valley. Tunnelling began in 1942, the work being carried out by a German contracting firm, using French North African forced labourers and Russian slave labourers. Consequently, the workers were treated poorly and accidents were frequent. By mid 1944, construction was far from complete. The primary galleries were still unlined, and remain so as of 2025. However, the main galleries are in fact complete to a very high standard. It is believed that liquid concrete was poured down the escape shaft rather than carried in from the entrances. Ho2 is the only tunnel on Jersey, that was contracted back to front. Similarly to Ho1, the post war British Army saw the tunnel as an opportunity to hide what remained of the German Army. Circa 1947, the tunnel was sealed but not sealed to a proper standard, as the British Army believed that Jersey population would either be too intimidated to enter or would just move on and forget - This however, was not the case. As a consequence of the poorly sealed tunnel entrances, intruders were frequent in the 1950s/1960s mostly made up of the younger generation that were either too young to remember the occupation or weren't even alive, but were fuelled by an adventure of discovery the unchartered. The first sign of impending disaster occurred in 1952 when two youths ventured into the tunnel one night. They had told a friend about their adventures so when they failed to return home the following day a search party was sent out. The youths had entered into the tunnel with one torch between them and without the slightest knowledge of the tunnels layout, which at the time was still rammed with German equipment all shapes and sizes. Their torch failed when they were in the heart of the complex and they, as a result were totally lost. They spent their whole night trying to locate an exit . The following morning at 09:00, the two boys were rather relieved when a search party located them. The tunnel was immediately sealed, once again. In 1960. the local Evening Post, threw serious shots at the public warning them of the serious dangers and drew attention to the fact that every Sunday afternoon, 20 bicycles would be found lying outside the tunnel while their owners explored its interior. Tragedy eventually struck on the afternoon of Sunday, 27 May 1962, when two 15/16-year-old pupils from Victoria College were overcome by fumes in the tunnel and asphyxiated. After intense investigations, while in typical dramatic Jersey fashion, the local rumour was that of "Nazi gas kills youths!" - it was eventually discovered that the tragedy was due to a bonfire having been lit in the tunnel a few days beforehand, with only one small entrance to Ho2 being open at the time, therefore all the oxygen had been consumed.
- Ho3 (Munitions Store II) – Planning stage only – Upper end of The German Road, St. Peters Valley. Although the tunnel never got beyond the point of planning, it would appear to have been sited in the vicinity of what was formerly Jersey Coal Distributions' yard.
- Ho4 (Munitions Store III) – Incomplete but occupied – West side of Grand Vaux Valley, St. Helier. Construction of this tunnel was sufficiently advanced for it be used for its intended purpose from May 1944. Ho4 is one of the larger complexes and is almost identical to the plan of Ho1. A plaque to the rear of the tunnel records that the construction was in the hands of the Deutsche Asphalt Company and while the initial work was doubtless carried out by French and North African forced labourers, Russians were later moved over from the west of the island to assist. With the departure of the Russians in 1943, it is said that the work was carried on by a smaller force consisting of French labour. On 28 April 1943, it was recorded that a premature explosion occurred, which resulted in multiple casualties being taken to hospital; however, this did not necessarily happen in Ho4, as Ho10/11 were also being excavated simultaneously. That being said, there was a severe rock fall within Ho4 which had an remarkably had impact on the field above. Following the 1962 tragedy in Ho2, Ho4 was sealed properly. Since then, Ho4 has had a fairly unremarkable life; used as a potato store for many years, the tunnel is now mainly operated by Jersey Water who likewise use the tunnel for storage purposes. Following the 2010 flu pandemic, the tunnel was planned to be used as a mortuary.
- Ho5 (Fuel Store I) – Complete and occupied – Railway Walk, St. Aubin, Located inside the former Jersey Railways & Tramways tunnel at St Aubin and was converted into a munition store in 1944. In 1941, the German engineers lost no time in exploiting the tunnels potential, setting to work to enlarge the diameter of the original bore whilst leaving the portals unaltered save for the erection of a hefty concrete anti-blast wall hard by the lower entrance; this incorporated a machine gun loophole which formed the defensive position known as Winderstandsnest Aubins Ort (Resistance Nest St Aubins Village). Once the task of enlarging the original bore was complete, the walls were then lined with concrete and the main gallery was driven at a right angle into the hillside. Although Ho5 was originally intended to be used as a fuel store, Ho5 was actually used to store ammunition.
- Ho6 (Personnel Shelter I) – Unknown if it ever got past the exploratory stage – L'Aleval, St. Peter As a result of information given by a local person, an involuntary worker in Ho1 in 1943, who stated that he remembered some sort of construction being carried out at the top of The German road, it was assumed that this was in connection with the excavation of Ho6. However, it is now believed, that this work was in connection with water suppliers to the tunnels lower down the road, (Ho1/Ho2).
- Ho7 (Artillery Reserves) – Planning stage only – Cap Verd, St. Lawrence. Although some exploratory work seems to have been carried out, actual construction never got underway. Cap Verd, better known as the location to the rear entrance of Ho8.
- Ho8 (Artillery Quarters) – Incomplete but open to the public – Cap Verd, St. Lawrence. Work on Ho8 commenced in September 1941. By the end of 1941, the workforce consisted of French North Africans, Spaniards and local voluntary labour. The Russians and Ukrainians did not arrive until August 1942. According to several reports, accidents were frequent and one record notes that three workers were killed by a rockfall and another, more serious, when 22 workers perished. It is said that some of those that perished were left under the rockfall as it was deemed too dangerous to retrieve the bodies. Contrary to popular post-war guide stories, bodies that were recovered were not tipped into the concrete lining the tunnels, but were removed and buried at Westmount. Ghost stories are a common theme in association with Ho8. Joe Miere, describes how, during the 17 years that he worked in the tunnel, he often saw the ghost of a German overseer that was within the Organisation Todd (OT), walking the corridors and he is not alone in this. One night a couple were parked near the main entrance to Ho8, when they suddenly became rather spooked. A restless spirit not only walked through the iron barred gates, but through a car. What confirmed the ghosts existence in Joe's mind, was that all those who reported sittings, described the same khaki uniform. Unknown to Joe at the time, this was the colour of the German OT uniform at the time. By the first anniversary of Liberation on 9 May 1946, Ho8 was completely cleared and in response to popular demand, opened to the public for the first time and remains open as of 2025. It would be deemed as one of Jersey's most popular tourist attractions.
- Ho9 (Electricity Generating Station I) – Planning stage only – Bellozanne Valley, St. Helier. The entire German defensive system depended upon the electrical current generated by the Queen's Road Power Station, operated by the Jersey Electricity Company. The building however, was located in an extremely open and vulnerable position at Mont a Labbe and was an easy target for aerial attacks. The Festpistab (a German Engineering Firm), thought it therefore made sense to create a subterranean power station in a valley as close to Mont a Labbe as possible, linkage would have then been possible into the existing power station with a minimum of difficulty. In order to house the necessary machinery, the tunnel would have had to have been of substantial proportions; but, even so and in a view of its importance to the defence system, it is rather surprising that Ho9 never got beyond the planning stage.
- Ho10 (Ration store II) – Incomplete and sealed – Grands Vaux, St. Helier - North of the main valley road. The tunnel curves through the two roads mentioned above. The northern entrance of Ho10 lies in what used to be known as Bichard's Quarry; the quarry itself was filled in when the block of flats, Les Carrieres, was built in the 1960s. The concrete curve of the roof above now blocked entrance may be seen protruding just above the surface of the car park to the rear of the flats. The southern entrance lies beneath the immense rockfall that can be seen to the rear of the property known as 'Tangier'. The rubble removed during the excavation was dumped in the meadow which lay across the road.
- Ho11 (Personnel shelter II) – Planning stage only – Not much is known about this tunnel, other than the fact that it was intended for excavation in the area of the dam of the Grands Vaux reservoir.
- Ho12 (Fuel store II) – Incomplete and private – La Commune, St. Saviour. The blocked off entrance lies some 100 yards to the south of the road known as La Commune, where it descends from Victoria Village and joins La Rue au Bailli. The tunnel is on private property and was under construction in mid 1943. However, the popular rumour that there is a 'tunnel beneath Victoria Village' is false as only about 60 yards of rubble had been excavated when all work ceased. The adit was destroyed with explosives following the 1962 tragedy in Ho2, but for many years the precise spot could be located by a length of prefabricated 60 cm railway track protruding from the rock face. The track was recovered in 1980 and is now in the care of the Channel Islands Occupation Society (CIOS).
- Ho13 (Munition store IV) – Incomplete, private and very dangerous - East side Beaumont Valley, St. Lawrence. The tunnel known as Ho13, finds itself located beneath Beaumont Hill, just north of Warren Farm, on the east side of the valley. By 17 September 1942, preliminary clearance work had commenced about 200 yards to the north of Warren Farm and by mid October 1942, the pilot tunnel here was some 15 yards long; but, because of water problems, was abandoned by the end of the month. A new adit was commenced nearer to Warren Farm on 4 November 1942 and another, some considerable distance to the north, a few days later - these are the two entrances that still survive today. Problems with water were also encouraged at the northern entrance, and even though tunnellers persisted in this case, the water issues were sufficient to delay progress to the extent that this section was never lined and remains very dangerous to this day.
- Ho14 (Fuel store IV) – Existence is unknown - La Mont au Roux, La Haule Hill, St. Brelade. It is believed that this tunnel is located halfway up Le Mont au Roux, east side. Lying on one of the roads leading to the airport, the tunnel was intended for the use of the German Air Force (Luftwaffe). The possible location was in the enclave which lies roughly opposite the small reservoir half-way up the hill. Within Jersey local folk law, it is believed that this tunnel was constructed on an increasingly large scale, for the purpose of holding planes that required servicing and cover from the British air force.
- Ho15 (Storage) – Incomplete, private and very dangerous – West side of Beaumont Valley, St. Lawrence. Work on Ho15 began on 21 November 1942, when Russians began clearing the ground for the northern entrance; work on the southern adit did not commence until 31 March 1943. These two pilot tunnels met on 18 May 1943 but, although the bore was winded, only the tunnel floor was concreted before work was abandoned in 1944.
- Ho16 (Personnel Shelter) – Incomplete and abandoned – West side of Beaumont Valley, St. Lawrence. The abandoned entrance is located to the east side of Beaumont Hill, opposite the slope leading down to Warren Farm. Few if any of the hundreds of motorists that go up and down Beaumont Hill everyday, realise that on one hand they are driving past the entrance of an abandoned German tunnel (Ho16) and, on the other, driving over a largely completed one (Ho13).
- Ho18 (Hospital) – Planning stage only – Westmount, St. Helier. Firstly, although the German maps of Jersey do not identify Ho18, the maps of Guernsey and Alderney do. Secondly, it is a little known fact that a pilot tunnel was bored into the lower slopes of Westmount in the 19th century in the belief that the rock thereabouts was suitable for the mining of copper. These hopes were dashed when the tunnel was sealed. However, in 1939 the Parish of St. Helier re-opened the tunnel, fitting it with wooden benches and made available for use as an air raid shelter. The tunnel was about halfway up the hill, almost opposite to the now Bowling Club headquarters, and would most likely have become Ho18, had work ever commenced. Thus, not only would the Germans have had their work started for them, but the proposed Ho18 would have been conveniently situated beneath Overdale Hospital and not far from the rear entrance of the General Hospital in Kensington Place.
- Ho19 (Harbour Electricity Generating Station) – Incomplete but occupied – La Folie, St Helier. This group of tunnels (Ho19/20) lie close to St Helier Harbour between La Folie Inn and the South Pier, burrowing beneath Mount Bingham. On 15 July 1942, the German OT, with a due pomp and circumstance as befits such an occasion, opened their metre gauge steam railway which was to carry vast quantities of building material and suppliers to the west of the island and eventually all parts of Jersey. However, when surveying the route to serve the east of the island, it was not long before the OT came up against Le Mont de le Ville (on which stands Fort Regent), the one obstacle that thwarted the 19th Century railway promoters and their plans to lay a railway from St Aubin in the west to St Catherine in the east. One of the biggest fears of the German Navy was that a few well aimed bombs descending upon Queen's Road power station of the Jersey Electricity Company would render every crane in the St Helier Harbour useless. With this in mind, it was decided to construct a small power station, for the exclusive use of the cranes, in a tunnel close to the harbour, hence Ho19.
- Ho20 (Connecting Tunnel to Ho19) – Incomplete, not known if started - Mount Bingham Ho20 was planned as an extension of Ho19 to enable troops and material to pass from one side of Mount Bingham to the other without having to appear above the ground. Ho20 was hardly likely to have been the nearby railway tunnel which, in any case, was not strictly a tunnel at all, but a passage constructed with concrete.
- Ho21 (Storage) – Planning stage only – Mont du Jubile - Jubilee Hill, St Peter. A sketch from a field note book, confirms that this tunnel was most definitely planned. Professor Klupfel's diary pinpoints its location to have been opposite the bend about half-way down Jubilee Hill and on the south side of the road. According to the Professor, work was abandoned owing to water problems near the proposed entrance. The abandonment must have been decided at an early date because the tunnel does not appear on the May 1942 maps.
- Ho22 (Storage) – Planning stage only - Rozel Valley, St Martin. This tunnel, even at the planning stage is suspect, being taken from the 'Meyer List'; it is true that there would be every reason to have munition store in the east of the island but the only evidence of its existence, like that of the below tunnels, comes from Herr Meyer, the former OT official, who supplied details of such.
- Ho23 (Personnel Shelter) – Planning stage only - Grouville Marsh It being obviously almost impossible to construct a tunnel in a marsh, the most likely location for this tunnel would have been at the nearby Les Maltieres Quarry, a few hundred yards to the west of Gorey Village.
- Ho24/25 (Storage) – planning stage only - Greve de Lecq Valley - St. Mary/St. Ouen According to Herr Meyer, Ho24/25 were under construction but were sealed at the end of the war; he even provided a rough sketch plan of their layout. Frankly, there is no physical evidence of their existence. Had they been so, to the extent that sketch plans suggest, then the rubble extracted would have obliterated the floor of Greve De Lecq Valley in the same manner as all the other valleys were desecrated wherever tunnels were constructed. Nor do any of the many areal reconnaissance photographs taken by the RAF reveal any evidence whatsoever of tunnels under construction.

=== Railway tunnels ===
Tunnels designed only for use as railway tunnels

- Eastern Railway Connecting tunnel – 2nd entrance at La Folie under Mt. Bingham – Incomplete, in use by JEC

=== Fortified tunnels ===
Either stand alone or as part of emplacements

- Ho Etacquerel – Defensive tunnel – Completed but private – L'Etacq, St. Ouen. This defensive tunnel forms part of the Strongpoint Etacquerel. Due to the fact that it is tucked away behind a frontage consisting of a standard Type 67- coastal defence gun almost opposite Mariner Cottages at L'Etacq. It burrows back into the hillside for some distance, curving left and ending in a substantial flight of stairs which lead to the main entrance situated behind the large private house built on the site of the former L'Etacquerel Hotel. The tunnel not only incorporates accommodation for personnel and ammunition, but includes a central heating system, cooking facilities, ventilation plant and a generator. Due to neglect, much of the metalwork is rusting away.
- Ho Mole Verclut – Defensive tunnel – Incomplete but open to the public – Verclut Point (Gibraltar Rock), St Martin. Verclut Point is the correct geographical term for the area popularly known as St Catherine's Breakwater. The Germans seized upon Gibraltar Rock as an ideal location to site a defensive tunnel equivalent to its brother (above). Consisting of a single tunnel with two side chambers, one more completed and the other half-finished, Ho Mole Vercult curves through Gibraltar from a simple entrance door and ends in another standard type 670 housing a 10.5 cm K 33 1 (f) coastal defence gun which covered the length of the breakwater. The bore of the tunnel was first lined with a coarse skim of cement mixed with gravel gathered from the beach in the vicinity and stone from Les Maltieres Quarry at Gorey, but containing no sand whatsoever. Apart from an interval in the 1990s, the tunnel has housed a vivier for the storage of live shellfish; permission was sought to convert to convert the tunnel into an aquarium and marine study which was refused. As of 2025, the CIOS have taken the tunnel over and run a tourist attraction.
- Stützpunkt Doktorhaus – Defensive tunnel – Completed, sealed and private – Mont Matthieu St. Ouen. Defensive tunnel forming a into a personnel shelter for those stationed at Strongpoint Doktorhaus. Protruding into the hill known as Mont Matthieu, which leads out to the bay of St. Ouen's bay, is a bunker incorporating two defensive machine gun loopholes and, uniquely for Jersey, displaying the title of the unit that built the Strongpoint, the sign translating to 'Rock Drilling Company 77'. Behind this strongpoint face is a tunnel forming a personnel shelter. The tunnel runs into the hillside for a few score yards, not only incorporating chambers for personnel, weapons and ammunition, but giving direct access, by means of a lengthy iron runged ladder, to the massive Company command and observation position which stands on the edge of the escarpment running behind the bay.
- Stützpunkt Corbiere – Communications tunnel – Completed and open to the public – La Corbiere, St.Brelade Communication tunnel between two bunkers on the north side of the road leading down to the lighthouse. It was common practise in Jersey for every bunker within a strongpoint or resistance nest to be self-standing, so that is one fell to the allies, others within the complex would not necessarily follow suit. Until the scrap metal merchants got to work in 1953, the upper bunker, a type 634, mounted a six-loopholed machine-gun turret, while the lower a type 633, incorporated are M19 automatic fortress mortar, although the weapon itself was removed by the British Army in 1945. In 1985, the COIS obtained permission to dig down into the buried entrance of the Strongpoint in order to survey its interior. There was considerable surprise when in fact, they found a staircase which led down. As of 2025, the Strongpoint is operated by the COIS and open to the public.
- Batterie Derfflinger – Gun Battery with accommodation – Completed – Le Mont de la Rocque, St. Brelade. A battery of four 8 cm FK 30(t) Czech field guns with underground accommodation and support facilities. After the adjacent French coast fell into Allied hands in 1944, there was a shift in defensive effort. The gunners' quarters battery HQ and forward observation post are all connected by underground passageways constructed on the 'cut and cover' system by an Army Construction Battalion; thus they are not deemed to be true tunnels but are of sufficient interest for them to be included within this. Built almost entirely by brick, these passageways extend for a considerable distance through fields on private land, however; can easily be accessed.
- Batterie Seydlitz – Gun Battery with accommodation – Completed – Le Mont du Coin, St Brelade. A battery 8 cm FK 30(t) Czech field guns with underground accommodation and support facilities. Seydlitz was the only other divisional artillery battery equipped with 8 cm field guns, and was Derfflinger's nearest neighbour, being established on the edge of the escarpment overlooking La Haule, to the north of St. Aubin, in early 1942. The gun positions and support structures were inter-connected by concrete-lined passageways. Although much of its battery disappeared when the site was developed in the 1960s, large parts of its passageway network survive, together with one of the gun emplacements, the battery HQ, observation post and various shelters.
- Batterie Moltke – Gun Battery with tunnel system – Some completed and open to public by CIOS. Others have been lost to time but are still accessible – Les Landes Common, St Ouen Coastal artillery battery located at the north-west of the island. By the end of 1941, Army Coastal Battery 356 was installed on Les Landes Common. While waiting on arrival of the applicable guns, work on the construction of the gun pits and the supporting personnel/ammunition bunkers was pressed energetically ahead, each gun having one of each, with the exception of the No.4 gun, which had two ammunition bunkers. All these builders were placed below the ground using the common 'cut and cover' method.
- Batterie Schliefen – Small wood lined tunnel – Completed but lost to time – Verclut, Grouville The above mentioned area, stands on high ground in Grouville. With sweeping views over the entire south-east corner of the Island, From Mont Orgueil to Le Hocq in the west, it is hardly surprising that the Germans established a nest in this location. Ever since circa 1950, the owners of the land have pursued to locate in their belief to be a tunnel that had been linking the two points and they were correct. However, any hopes of finding the subterranean passage were stillborn as it was merely a deep trench that was lined with wood and covered with earth. it was ripped up in 1946 and the wood lining was disposed of at an auction.

=== Associated with tunnels ===
Infrastructure used to support tunnels

- Stream Culvert – Beaumont Valley (used to protect stream from planned dumping of rubble)- intact visible from road
- Stone Crusher – L'Aleval, between Ho2 entrances – ruins
- Power Station – St Peter's Valley, Tesson Mill area – Main building and reservoir can be seen from road
- Queens Road Power Station – Queens Road – Used to supply electricity to the whole Island including tunnels (tunnels would also have backup generators)

== See also ==
- German occupation of the Channel Islands
- Hohlgangsanlage 8
- Atlantic Wall
