= Raversijde =

Coordinates: 51°12′22″N 2°51′50″E

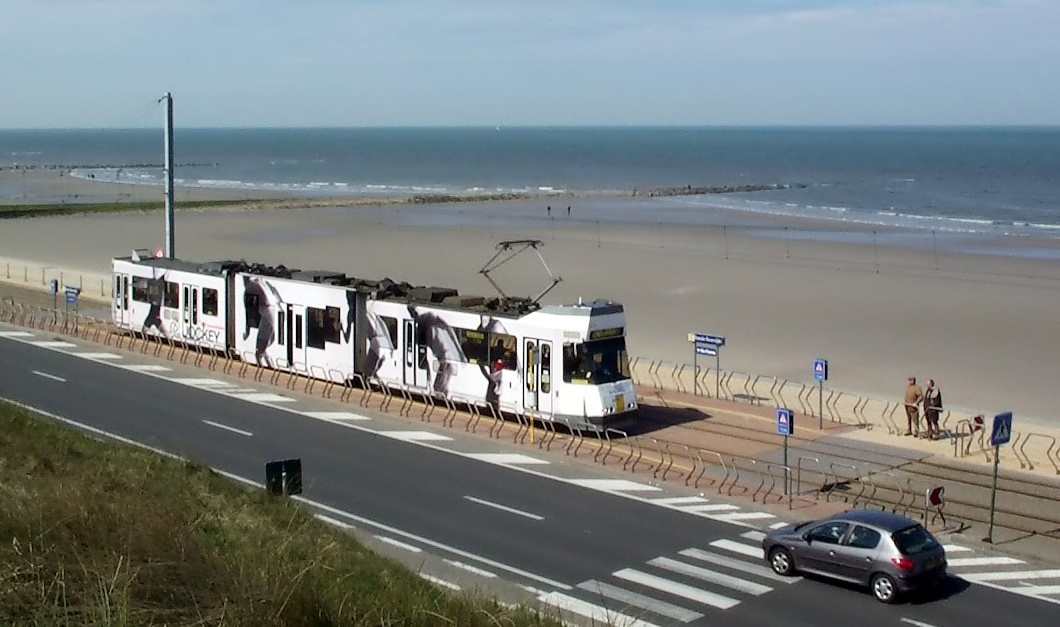
The Belgian Coast Tram at Domein Raversijde

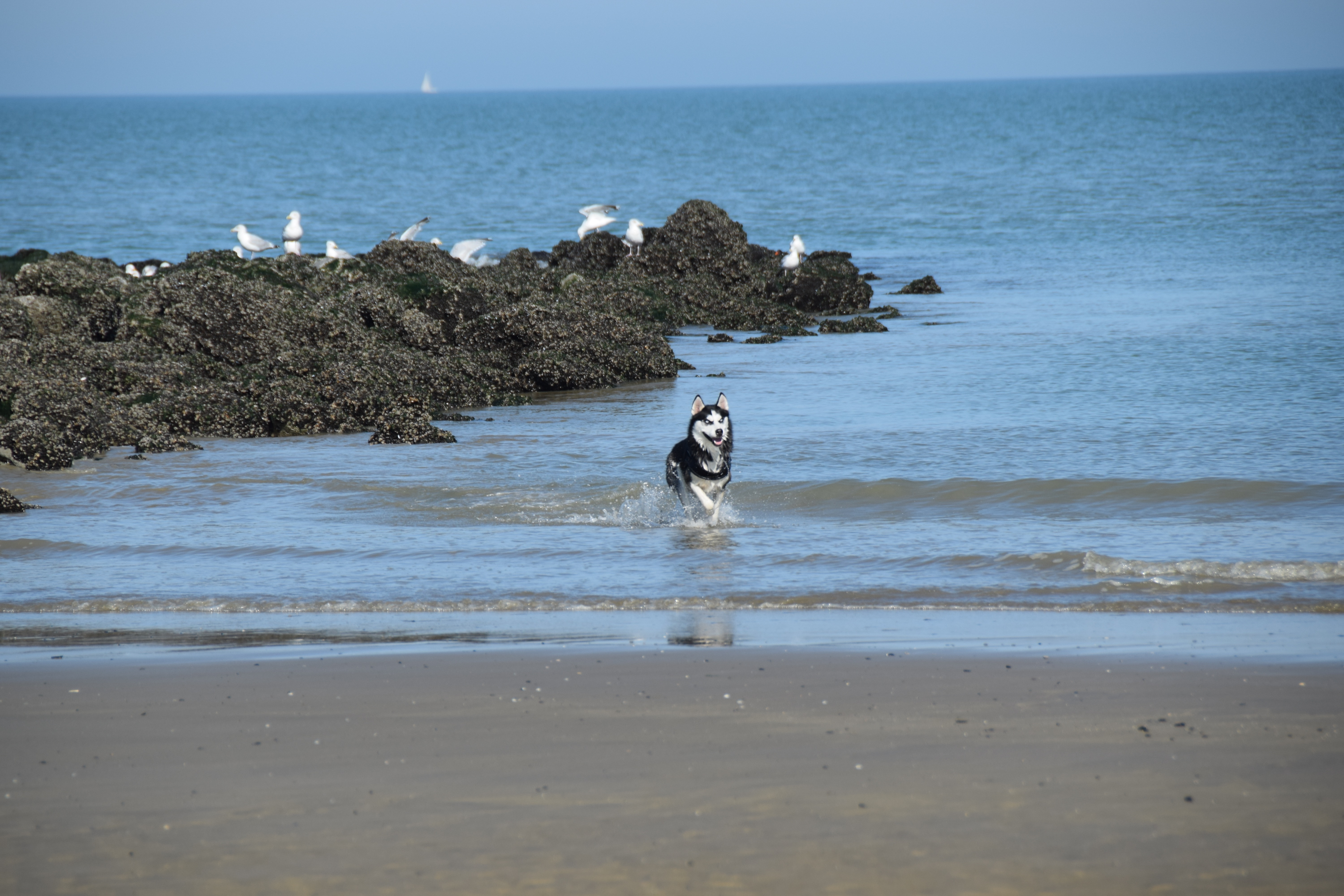
On the beach from the "Westlaan" (Raversijde, the pier 15a) until "Middelkerke" (between piers 19 and 20), dogs are allowed there all year.

Raversijde (West Flemish: Raversyde) is a neighborhood and former parish of the West Flemish town of Ostend. It is adjacent to Middelkerke, another neighborhood, which is located on the North Sea coast. Raversijde is located on the Kusttram, which is the coastal tramway.

Raversijde has the remains of the Atlantic Wall in the dunes built under the German Occupation of Belgium in the Second World War. It is also the site of the Atlantic Wall Open Air Museum where the remains of the Atlantic Wall built under the German Occupation of Belgium in the Second World War are preserved and open to visitors.

The Count of Flanders, Prince Charles (who served as Regent between 1944–1950) owned an estate in Raversijde where he died in 1983.
