= Allied siege of La Rochelle =

1944/45 containment of German troops holding French port

Allied siege of La Rochelle (1944–1945)
- Part of World War II
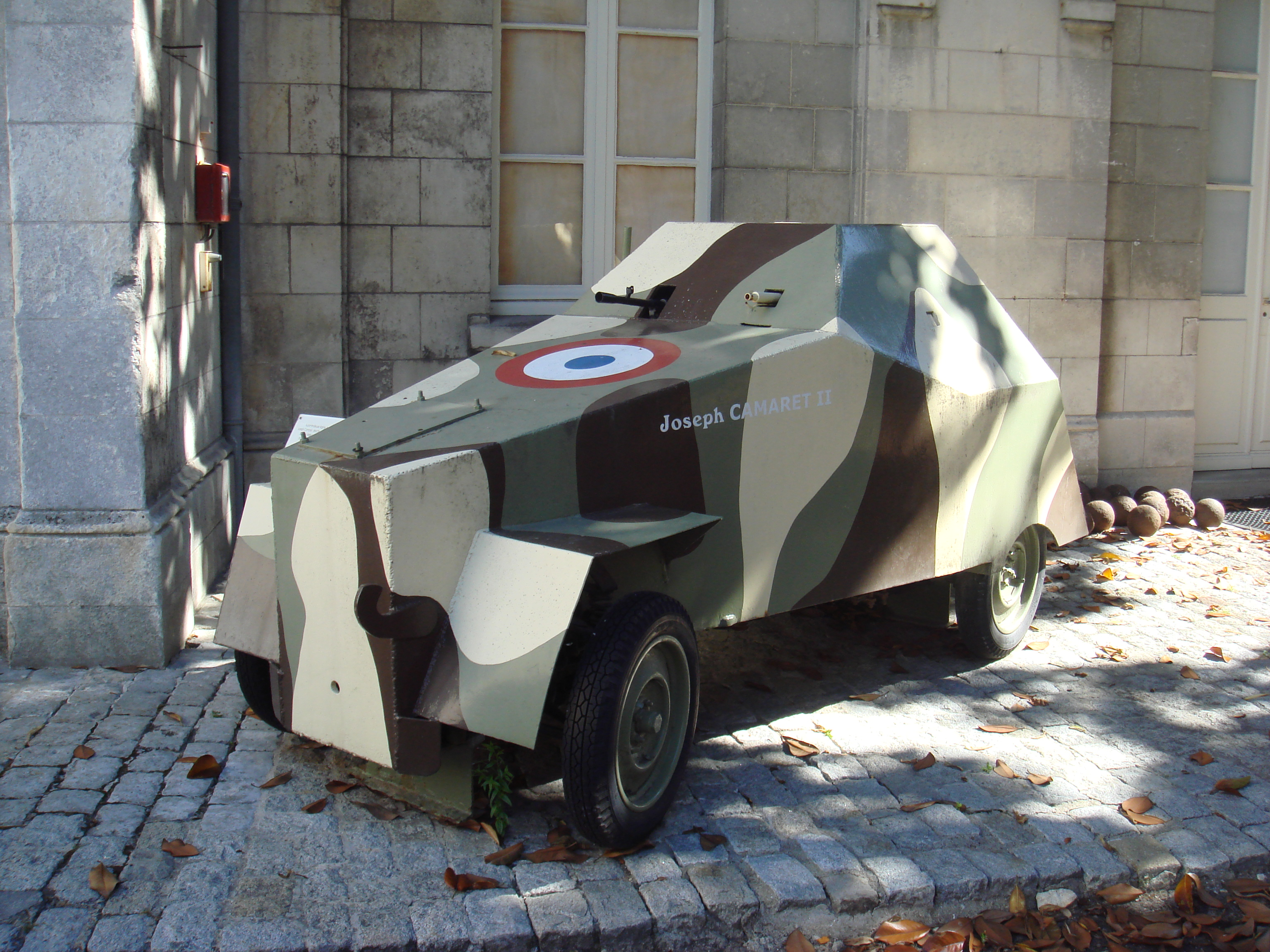
- French Army armoured car which participated in the liberation of La Rochelle in 1945. Musée d'Orbigny-Bernon.
| Date | 21 September 1944 – May 1945 |
| Location | La Rochelle |
| Result | German surrender |

Belligerents
| (Nazi Germany) Germany | France; United States; United Kingdom |

Commanders and leaders
| (Nazi Germany) Vice-Admiral Ernst Schirlitz (surrendered) | General Edgard de Larminat |

Strength
| 22,000 | |

The Allied siege of La Rochelle occurred during the Second World War in 1944–45, when Allied troops invaded France. La Rochelle was an important German naval base on the Atlantic for surface ships and submarines, from which U-boat campaigns were launched.

La Rochelle and other harbours such as Royan and Saint-Nazaire, became "Atlantic pockets" still occupied by the Germans, which were bypassed by the main thrust of the Allied invasion, as was Dunkirk on the North Sea. The city was liberated only at the very end of the war, nine months after the Liberation of Paris, after the general German capitulation on 8 May 1945.

== Siege ==
The Allied siege of the pocket of La Rochelle lasted from September 1944 to May 1945, without heavy bombardment. La Rochelle remained in German hands until the end of the war, like other Atlantic pockets such as Saint-Nazaire and Lorient. Just surrounding the city was considered wiser than conducting a frontal attack, as the city would ultimately fall anyway with the end of the war. The Wehrmacht fortified the ports in order to deny their logistical capacity to the Allies and maintain the U-boat threat to Allied shipping in the Atlantic.

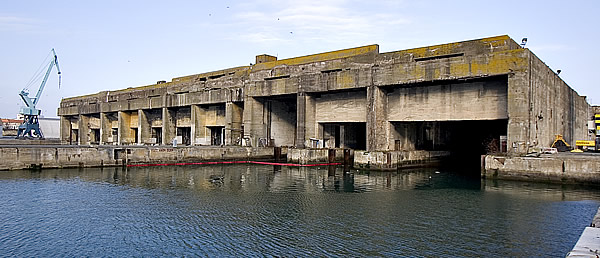
U-boat bunker at the harbor of La Rochelle

In total 39,500 French civilians were under the rule of Vice-Admiral Ernst Schirlitz, who served as the Naval Commander Atlantic Coast, from 1943 in La Rochelle until the end of the war. The German garrison numbered 22,000 men. During the siege the Allies still allowed for electricity, wood and some supplies to be delivered in order to alleviate the ordeal of the civilian population inside the walls of the city. Agreements were made between the French and the German occupation force in La Rochelle, to the effect that the French would not attack and that in exchange the Germans would not destroy the port installations of La Rochelle-La Pallice.

In effect, La Rochelle was surrounded efficiently enough, and suffered enough from the siege, with harbour facilities being damaged by Allied air attacks, that the Germans were unable to launch major U-boat attacks on Allied shipping for the duration of the siege. However, every week a Luftwaffe plane was able to break through the blockade and supply the garrison. In order to raise the morale of German troops in La Rochelle, the propaganda movie Kolberg, celebrating resistance against the French in 1806, was sent in by Göring and premiered simultaneously in Berlin and La Rochelle on 30 January 1945.

From spring 1945, General Edgard de Larminat was put in charge of French forces in the region, with the objective of capturing La Rochelle. The United States was to give logistical support as well as strategic air support. The first pocket to be attacked was the nearby Royan pocket. The city suffered heavy bombardment by 1,000 planes, with the result that the city was razed and 1,500 civilians killed. La Rochelle escaped this fate only because Royan was at the time considered a higher priority, due to its commanding position on the Gironde River. Opération Mousquetaire, the planned assault on La Rochelle, was cancelled with the capitulation of Germany.

La Rochelle was one of the last French cities to be liberated in 1945. It was surrendered to the Allies only on 7 May 1945, with the surrender ceremony occurring on 8 May 1945, at 23:45. The Germans surrendered in Dunkirk on 9 May and Saint-Nazaire on 11 May.

The 4e régiment de Zouaves especially participated in the liberation of La Rochelle.

== Legacy ==
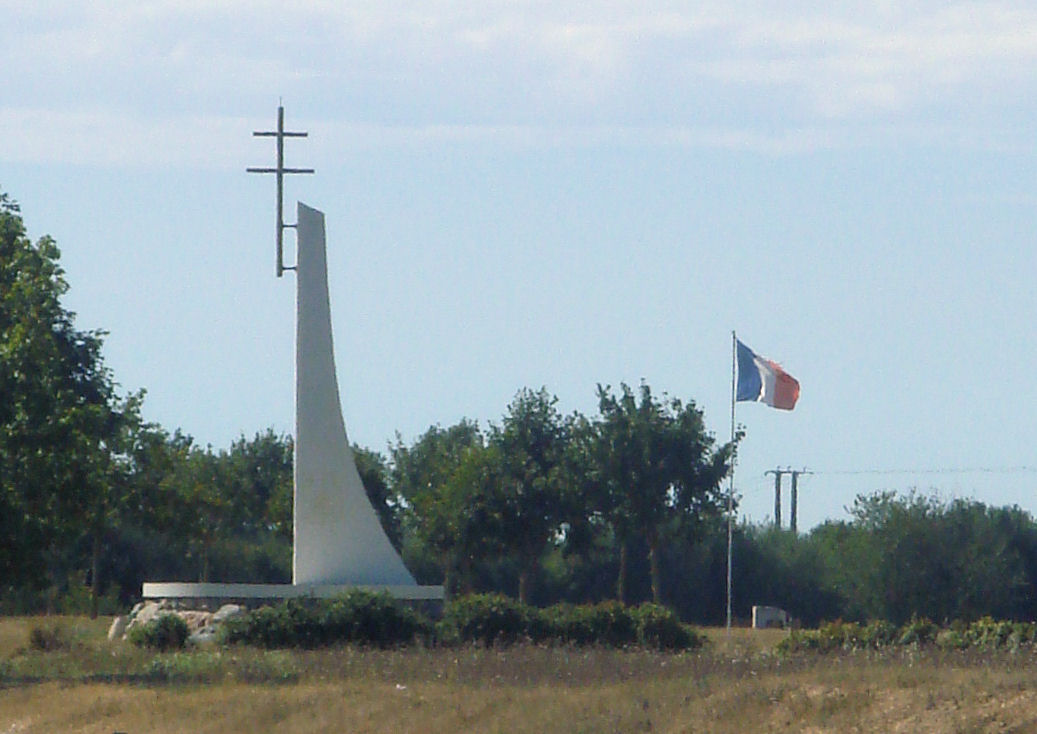
Monument to the "pocket of La Rochelle" ("Mémorial de la poche de La Rochelle 1944-1945"), near Saint-Sauveur-d'Aunis

US troops remained in the area around La Rochelle, as part of North Atlantic Treaty Organization arrangements, at the bases of La Rochelle, Croix-Chapeau, Bussac-Forêt, and Saint-Jean-d'Angély (Fontenet) until 1966. In 1969 Charles de Gaulle withdrew France from the NATO Military Command Structure, and ordered the closure of NATO bases in France.

On 7 September 1996, a monument was established near the boundary of the La Rochelle pocket, near Saint-Sauveur-d'Aunis, the "Mémorial de la poche de la Rochelle", in memory of the soldiers who died in the operation.

== See also ==
- Das Boot
- Liberation of France
