= Ernst Schirlitz =

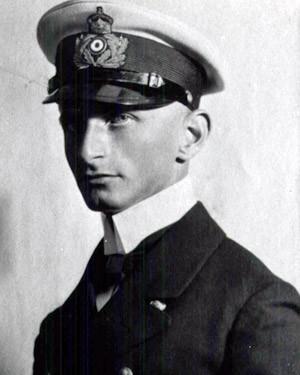
- Schirlitz as a Leutnant in the Imperial German Navy
- Born: 7 September 1893; Christburg, West Prussia
- Died: 27 November 1978 (aged 85); Kiel
- Military career
- Allegiance: German Empire; Weimar Republic (to 1933); Nazi Germany
- Branch: Imperial German Navy; Reichsmarine; Kriegsmarine
- Service years: 1912–45
- Rank: Vizeadmiral
- Units: SMS Hertha; SMS Freya; SMS Friedrich Carl; SMS Fürst Bismarck; Luftschiff "L 7", "L 20", "L 33"
- Conflicts: World War I World War II
- Awards: Knight's Cross of the Iron Cross

Ernst Schirlitz (7 September 1893 – 27 November 1978) was a German vice admiral in the navy (Kriegsmarine) of Nazi Germany. He served during World War II and was a recipient of the Knight's Cross of the Iron Cross. He surrendered at the end of World War II after the Allied siege of La Rochelle.

Schirlitz served as a watch officer on Luftschiff "L 33" which crashed in Little Wigborough, Essex on 24 September 1916. Schirlitz was taken prisoner of war by the British and was released in November 1919.

== Awards ==
- Iron Cross (1914) 2nd and 1st Class
- German Cross in Gold on 1 December 1944 as Vizeadmiral in fortress La Rochelle
- Knight's Cross of the Iron Cross on 11 March 1945 as Vizeadmiral and as commander Atlantic coast and of fortress La Rochelle.
