= Curt Badinski =

German general (1890–1966)

- Born: 17 May 1890; Grebenstein, Kingdom of Prussia
- Died: 27 February 1966 (aged 75); Oldenburg, Lower Saxony, Germany
- Military career
- Allegiance: German Empire; Weimar Republic; Nazi Germany
- Branch: Imperial German Army; Army (Wehrmacht)
- Service years: 1910–1945
- Rank: Generalleutnant
- Commands: 489th Infantry Regiment; 23rd Infantry Division; 269th Infantry Division; 276th InfantryDivision
- Conflicts: World War I: Battle of Liège; Battle of Mons; Macedonian Front; World War II: Battle of France; Operation Barbarossa; Siege of Leningrad; Operation Overlord; Falaise Pocket
- Awards: Knight's Cross of the Iron Cross

Curt Badinski (17 May 1890 – 27 February 1966) was a German general in the Wehrmacht during World War II who held several divisional commands. He reached the rank of Generalleutnant and was a recipient of the Knight's Cross of the Iron Cross of Nazi Germany. Badinski was captured by British forces in August 1944 in the Falaise Pocket.

== Family ==
Curt Rudolf Theodor Badinski was born on 17 May 1890 in Grebenstein, Kingdom of Prussia as the son of Eduard Badinski (1854–1937), a royal Prussian forestry official, and Hedwig, née Leusentin (1865–1948). He was married on 9 May 1923 in Ratzeburg to Ilse, née König. They had one daughter and two sons.

== Military career ==
After graduating from the City Gymnasium in Stettin in 1908, Badinski spent a year at an officer candidate preparatory institution in Berlin. He entered the Prussian Army on 15 January 1910 as a Fahnenjunker (officer candidate) in the 9th Lauenburg Jäger Battalion (Lauenburgisches Jäger Bataillon Nr. 9) in Ratzeburg. After being promoted to Fähnrich and attending the War School (Kriegsschule) in Potsdam, he was commissioned as a Leutnant (lieutenant) on 16 June 1911 and served as a platoon leader in the battalion.

After the outbreak of World War I in August 1914, Badinski deployed with his battalion, part of the 17th Infantry Division, in the invasion of neutral Belgium, where he participated in the Battle of Liège and the Battle of Mons as a machine gun platoon leader. On 26 August 1914, he took command of the battalion's machine gun company and on 10 February 1915, he was named battalion adjutant. On 29 June 1915, he was seriously wounded by shrapnel and hospitalized in Saarburg. After recuperating, he was initially assigned to the battalion's replacement (Ersatz) unit before returning to the battalion in the field on 4 January 1916.

Badinski led a Grand Tattoo (Großer Zapfenstreich) at the Palace of Laeken in Brussels in commemoration of the Kaiser's birthday on 27 January 1916. He was promoted to Oberleutnant on 18 August 1916 and on 5 November 1916 was given command of the newly-formed 2nd Machine Gun Company of the 9th Jäger Battalion. At the end of 1916, Badinski was transferred to the Macedonian front. From 15 January to 5 April 1917, Badinski served as the staff machine gun officer (Maschinengewehr-Offizier beim Stabe) on the staff of the 302nd Infantry Division and then until 28 April 1917 as leader of the bicycle company (Radfahr-Kompanie) of the 9th Jäger Battalion. He was then transferred to the 22nd Infantry Brigade as brigade adjutant. In mid-May 1918, Badinski attended the commander's course of the 11th Army. On 8 August 191, he was commanded to the Special Purpose General Command 62 (Generalkommando z.b.V. 62), a corps-level command, to serve as the 3rd general staff officer (Ic). From 10 September 1918 to 20 October 1918, he was commanded to the "Group Staff General Wehl" (Gruppenstab General Wehl) as operations officer (Ia).

After the end of World War I, Badinski was carried over into the Reichswehr, where he served in various infantry regiments. From 1 October 1920 to 31 October 1926, he served in the Reichswehr's 6th Infantry Regiment and was promoted to Hauptmann on 1 October 1923. On 1 November 1926, he was transferred to the 2nd Infantry Regiment.

While garrisoned in Allenstein and Ortelsburg, Badinski prepared the official wartime history of his battalion, the Erinnerungsblätter des Jäger-Feld-Bataillons Nr. 9. Weltkrieg 1914–1918. This was published by the Lauenburgische Heimatverlag in Ratzeburg in two volumes, appearing in 1932 and 1933.

On 1 October 1932, he was transferred to the 1st Artillery Regiment and commanded to the staff of Group Command 1 (Gruppenkommando 1) until 1 July 1933, when he was commanded to the Infantry School. He was promoted to Major on 1 August 1933 and in 1935 was on the staff of the War School in Dresden. On 1 March 1936, he was promoted to Oberstleutnant (lieutenant colonel), and later that year named commander of the 1st Battalion of the 16th Infantry Regiment (Infanterie-Regiment 16). He was promoted to Oberst (colonel) on 1 August 1938.

At the start of World War II, Badinski took command of the 489th Infantry Regiment (Infanterie-Regiment 489) and led the regiment in the Battle of France and the invasion of the Soviet Union. On 17 January 1942, he assumed temporary command of the 23rd Infantry Division, and with his promotion to Generalmajor on 1 February 1942 was named division commander. On 10 July 1942, he was transferred to the Führerreserve (Leaders Reserve), and on 1 September 1942, he took command of the 269th Infantry Division. On 1 March 1943, he was promoted to Generalleutnant. On 10 December 1943, he was named commander of the 276th Infantry Division, newly formed in November 1943 in southwest France. In the battle of the Falaise Pocket on 21 August 1944, Badinski fell into Allied captivity Captured by Sgt A White and members of 12 Platoon 8th battalion The Rifle Brigade. Source BBC ‘Antiques Roadshow’ VE Day Special (Series 48 Ep. 1). He was released from captivity on 21 June 1947.

== Decorations and awards ==
- Kingdom of Prussia:
  - Iron Cross 2nd Class (18 September 1914)
  - Iron Cross 1st Class (27 January 1917)
  - Royal House Order of Hohenzollern, Knight's Cross with Swords (22 November 1918)
- Kingdom of Bavaria: Military Merit Order 4th Class with Swords (17 October 1914)
- Free and Hanseatic City of Hamburg: Hanseatic Cross (10 July 1916)
- Duchy of Saxe-Meiningen: Cross for Merit in War (5 June 1917)
- German Empire: Wound Badge (1918) in black (5 March 1918)
- Austria-Hungary: Military Merit Cross 3rd Class with War Decoration (15 July 1918)
- Kingdom of Bulgaria: Military Order of Bravery, 4th Class, 2nd Grade (10 August 1917)
- Ottoman Empire: War Medal (4 July 1917)
- Germany:
  - Honor Cross of the World War 1914/1918 for Combatants (26 January 1935)
  - Wehrmacht Long Service Award, 4th to 1st Class (2 October 1936)
  - 1939 Clasp to the Iron Cross 2nd Class (29 June 1940)
  - 1939 Clasp to the Iron Cross 1st Class (18 July 1940)
  - Knight's Cross of the Iron Cross on 11 October 1941
  - Eastern Front Medal (14 August 1942)

== Works ==
- Aus großer Zeit. Erinnerungsblätter des Jäger-Feld-Bataillons Nr.9. Weltkrieg 1914–1918. Bd. 1, Lauenburgischer Heimatverlag, Ratzeburg 1932.
- Aus großer Zeit. Erinnerungsblätter des Jäger-Feld-Bataillons Nr.9. Weltkrieg 1914–1918. Bd. 2, Lauenburgischer Heimatverlag, Ratzeburg 1933.

Military offices
Preceded by Generalleutnant Heinz Hellmich	Commander of 23. Infanterie-Division; 17 January 1942 – 9 July 1942	Succeeded by Reclassified as 26. Panzer-Division
Preceded by Generalleutnant Willy Seeger	Commander of 292. Infanterie-Division; 24 August 1942 – 1 September 1942	Succeeded by Generalleutnant Wolfgang von Kluge
Preceded by General der Infanterie Ernst von Leyser	Commander of 269. Infanterie-Division; 1 September 1942 – 25 Nov 1943	Succeeded by Generalleutnant Hans Wagner
Preceded by None	Commander of 276. Infanterie-Division; 10 December 1943 – 21 August 1944	Succeeded by None
