= Wolfgang von Kluge =

WW2 German Army general (1892-1976)

- Born: 5 May 1892; Stettin, German Empire
- Died: 30 October 1976 (aged 84); Wahlstedt, West Germany
- Relatives: Günther von Kluge (brother); Eike-Henner Kluge (grandson)
- Military career
- Allegiance: German Empire; Weimar Republic; Nazi Germany
- Branch: German Army
- Service years: 1912–1944
- Rank: Generalleutnant
- Commands: 292nd Infantry Division; 357th Infantry Division; 226th Infantry Division; Fortress Dunkirk
- Conflicts: World War I; World War II; Operation Barbarossa; Battle of Uman; Battle of Kiev (1941); Battle of Moscow; Battles of Rzhev; Battle of Kursk; Siege of Dunkirk (1944)
- Awards: Knight's Cross of the Iron Cross

Wolfgang von Kluge (5 May 1892 – 30 October 1976) was a German military officer who served in both world wars. He rose to the rank of Generalleutnant in the Wehrmacht by 1943, commanding several divisions. He was commander of "Fortress Dunkirk" between July and September 1944. He was a recipient of the Knight's Cross of the Iron Cross of Nazi Germany.

He was the younger brother of Gunther von Kluge (1882–1944).

== Awards and decorations ==
- Knight's Cross of the Iron Cross on 29 August 1943 as Generalleutnant and commander of 292. Infanterie-Division

Military offices
Preceded by Generalleutnant Curt Badinski	Commander of 292. Infanterie-Division; 1 September 1942 – 20 July 1943	Succeeded by Generalleutnant Richard John
Preceded by None	Commander of 357. Infanterie-Division; 1 December 1943 – 1 April 1944	Succeeded by Generalmajor Knut Eberding
Preceded by None	Commander of 226. Infanterie-Division; 6 July 1944 – 9 September 1944	Succeeded by Unit became battle group at Fortress Dunkirk
Preceded by None	Commander of Fortress Dunkirk; 6 July 1944 – 31 December 1944	Succeeded by Vizeadmiral Friedrich Frisius
