= Richard John =

Richard John may refer to:

- Richard John (general) (1896–1965), Generalleutnant in the Wehrmacht during World War II
- Richard John (soldier) (1916–2010), Oberfeldwebel in the Wehrmacht during World War II
- Richard R. John (born 1959), historian of communications
