= 302nd Division (German Empire) =

- Active: 1916–1918
- Country: German Empire
- Branch: German Army
- Type: Infantry
- Size: ~7,000 personnel
- Part of: 62nd Corps (1916–18)
- Engagements: World War I: 2nd Crna Bend; Vardar Offensive

Commanders
- Notable commanders: Konrad von Hippel; Hermann von Ziegesar

The 302nd Division (302. Division) was an infantry division of the German Army. It was formed during World War I, as part of the 11th German-Bulgarian Army, combining members of both nationalities and saw service on the Macedonian front. During this time it fought major battles at Crna Bend and the Vardar Offensive. It was dissolved on 30 September 1918, in the aftermath of the capitulation of the 11th German-Bulgarian Army.

== History ==
The 302nd Division was organized on the Macedonian front in October 1916, under the name Division Hippel, after its commander Konrad von Hippel. The Division was part of the 62nd Corps of the 11th German-Bulgarian Army, combining members of both nationalities. On 30 December 1916, command was transferred to Hermann von Ziegesar, while the Division was renamed into the 302nd Division. By the beginning of May 1917, the 302nd Division occupied a 23 kilometres (14 mi) sector of the Crna Bend along with the 22nd German-Bulgarian Brigade. The sector formed a heavily fortified line, which included Hill 1050, Hill 1060 and Dabica, some of the most important positions on the Macedonian Front. The defense consisted of a complicated network of interconnected trenches, protected by several lines of barbed wire that averaged 3–5 metres (9.8–16.4 ft) in thickness, while reaching as much as 10–15 metres (33–49 ft) meters in crucial locations.

On 5 May 1917, 91 Italian and French batteries initiated an artillery bombardment of the Crna Bend which lasted through the rest of the day, in preparation of the Second Battle of the Crna Bend. At 6:00 a.m. on 6 May, the bombardment was resumed, while Entente patrols harassed 302nd Division's positions. The barrage continued until 6:30 a.m. on 9 May, when a combined Italian, French and Russian infantry assault was launched along a 23 kilometres (14 mi) long line. The focal points of the assault were the powerful positions on Hill 1020 and Hill 1050. To the right the 61st Italian Regiment took advantage of the dust cloud, left by the barrage, and managed to capture a forward trench that the Bulgarians had previously evacuated in face of the Allied artillery fire. The 1st and 3rd Italian Battalions overtook the trench of the 9th German Jäger Battalion, between Hill 1020 and Hill 1050. At 7:40 a.m., after receiving reinforcements and regrouping the Jägers pushed the Italians back to their starting point while also capturing 120 prisoners. The attack on Hill 1050 was held in check, apart from minor an infiltration of its eastern slope, which was aborted by a mine explosion. The 45th German Infantry Regiment managed to regain the ground it lost after the Italian left flank came under heavy fire from Piton Rocheaux. At 9:45 a.m., a second wave of Italian infantry rushed into no man's land, once again failing to secure its objectives and suffering heavy losses.

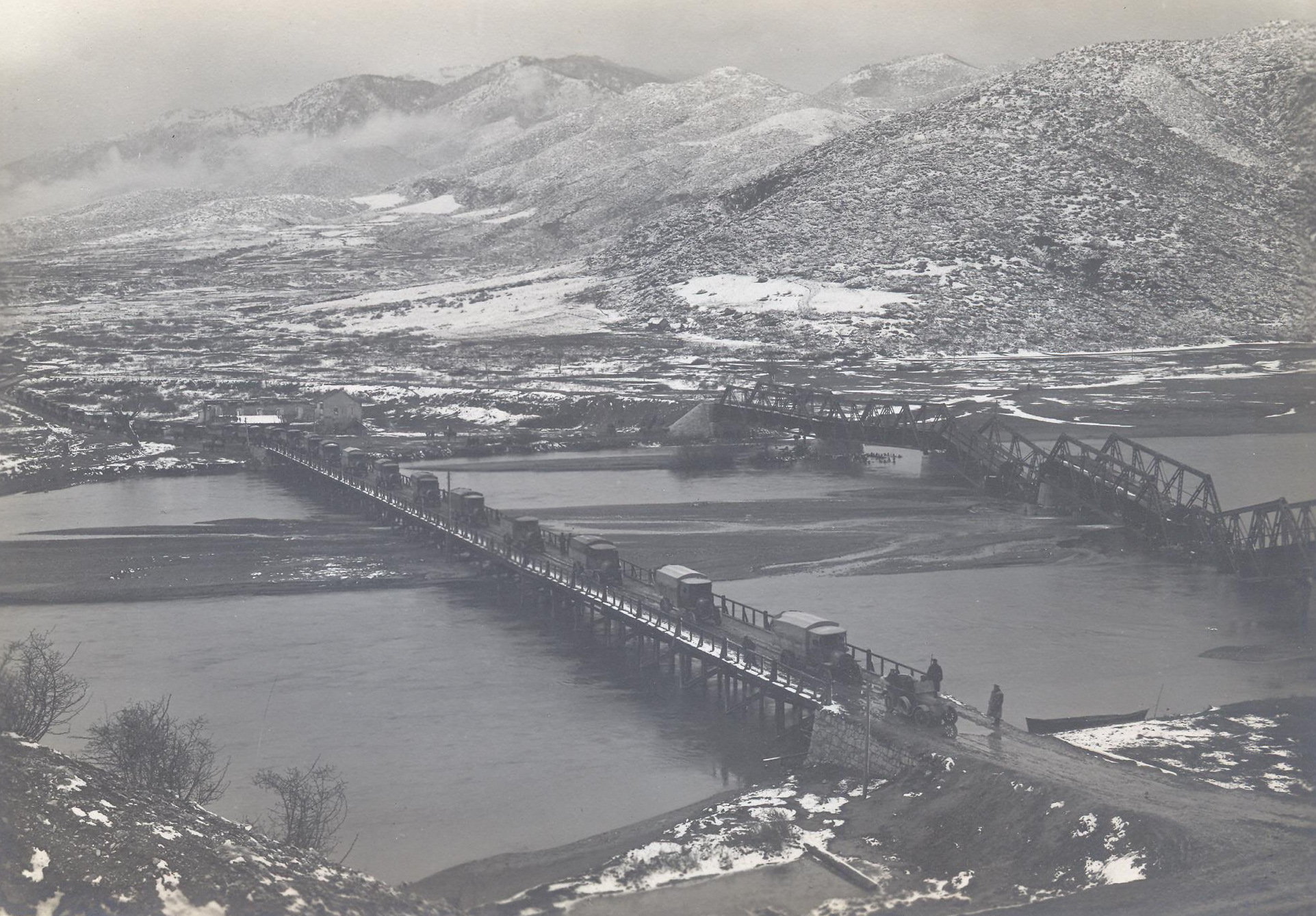
Bulgarian convoy in WW I

Further to the east the 16th French Colonial Infantry Division, was ordered to attack the positions of the Bulgarian 3/7 Infantry Brigade and parts of the German 201st Infantry Brigade. At 6:30 a.m., following two hours of artillery preparation, French troops went over the wall and entered the trenches around Piton Rocheaux. A costly hand-to-hand engagement ensued, during which the 201st German Infantry Brigade fended off the attackers. By 8:00 a.m., all attempts by the 16th French Colonial Infantry Division had been beaten down along the entire defensive line. At 9:00 a.m., the 3/7 Bulgarian Infantry Brigade repelled a second French assault on Tranchees Rouges. The losses of the 3/7 Bulgarian Infantry Brigade for the day amounted to 134 killed and 276 wounded. The Brigade captured 44 French troops in a half-drunken state and reported that its soldiers had counted 725 killed French soldiers. The battle concluded in a German–Bulgarian victory. The Division became entirely German shortly after the end of the battle.

On 15 September 1918, a combined force of Serbian, French and Greek troops attacked the Bulgarian-held trenches in Dobro Pole ("Good Field"). The assault and the preceding artillery preparation had devastating effects on Bulgarian morale, eventually leading to mass desertions. On September 18, a second Entente formation assaulted the Bulgarian positions in the vicinity of Lake Doiran. Effectively employing machine gun and artillery fire the Bulgarians managed to stall the Allied advance on the Doiran sector. However the collapse of the front at Dobro Pole forced the Bulgarians to withdraw from Doiran. The Allies pursued the German 11th Army and the Bulgarian 1st Army, while pushing deeper into Vardar Macedonia. At 17:30 p.m. on 22 September 1918, the 35th Italian Division assaulted Hill 1050, seizing it from the 302nd Division and taking 150 prisoners. Fighting took place in Kanatlarci and along the Monastir–Prilep road, in Cepik, Kalabak and Topolčani as the Allies continued to advance towards Prilep. At 14:00 p.m. on 23 September, General Louis Franchet d'Espèrey announced that the initial plan of the operation was to be modified. The Italians were ordered to strike Kičevo with the aim of preventing the enemy forces stationed at Monastir from reaching the railroad hub in Uskub, the 11th Colonial French Division was instead tasked with securing Prilep. Half an hour later the French entered Prilep, to the east Franco–Serbian columns marched on Štip, Veles, Brod and through the Peristeri mountain range. By 29 September, the Allies had captured the former headquarters of Uskub, thus endangering the remnants of the 11th Army.

Under those chaotic circumstances a Bulgarian delegation arrived in Thessaloniki to ask for an armistice. On 29 September, the Bulgarians were granted the Armistice of Salonica by General d'Esperey. The Bulgarian downfall turned the strategic and operational balance of the war against the Central Powers. The Macedonian Front was brought to an end at noon on 30 September, when the ceasefire came into effect. The treaty included the full capitulation of the Bulgarian forces that formed the majority of the 11th German Army, bringing the final tally of German and Bulgarian prisoners to 77,000 and granting the Allies 500 artillery pieces. The 302nd Division numbered 7,000 troops at the time of its surrender.

== Order of battle ==
In 1917, the division was composed of the following units:

- 22nd Infantry Brigade
  - Infanterie-Regt. Prinz Moritz von Anhalt-Dessau (5.Pommersches) Nr.42
  - 8. Ostpreußisches Infanterie-Regt. Nr.45
  - Hannoversches Jäger-Batl.Nr.10
- Feld-Artillerie-Regt. von Scharnhorst (1. Hannoversches) Nr.10
- 202nd Ambulance Co.
- 2. Elsässisches Pionier-Batl. Nr.19
- 672 Mounted Transport Column

In June 1917, the 42nd Infantry Regiment left for Romania and was replaced by the 21st Reserve Infantry Regiment from the 216th Division. By 1918, the 22nd Infantry Brigade had again been reorganized and consisted of the regiments below. The remainder of the division was unchanged:

- 22nd Infantry Brigade
  - Grenadier-Regt. König Friedrich III (2.Schlesisches) Nr.11
  - Lauenburgisches Jäger-Batl.Nr.9
  - Hannoversches Jäger-Batl.Nr.10

== Commanding officers ==
The following is a list of the 302nd Division's commanding officers:

From	To	Rank	Name
October 1916	29 December 1916	Lieutenant General	Konrad von Hippel
30 December 1916	31 October 1918	Major General	Hermann von Ziegesar
