= 302nd Division =

302nd Division may refer to:

- 302nd Division (German Empire)
- 302nd Infantry Division (Wehrmacht), Germany
- 302nd Rifle Division, Soviet Union
- 302nd Air Division, United States

== See also ==
- List of military divisions by number
