= 292nd Infantry Division =

- 292. Infanterie-Division
- Divisional insignia
- Active: 6 February 1940 – 4 April 1945
- Country: Nazi Germany
- Branch: Heer (Wehrmacht)
- Type: Infantry
- Size: Division

The 292nd Infantry Division was an infantry formation of Nazi Germany during World War II.

== History and organization ==
The division was formed on 6 February 1940, in the 8th mobilization wave, in Wehrkreis II (Pomerania). It played a small role in the French campaign. Before the invasion of the Soviet Union it was on occupation duty in Poland. It spent most of its subsequent existence with Army Group Centre, on the Eastern Front. In 1941, subordinated to Fourth Army, it took part in the Battle of Moscow, and in 1943 was involved in Operation Citadel.

After the crossed to Bug River with Army Group Centre in mid 1941, it was engaged at Brest and Białystok, the battle of Yelnya Bend, at Vjasma, and the on way to Moscow. It helped resist the Soviet counter attack in late 1941 and early 1942. It was part of the many defensive actions in 1942 including the battles of Gshatsk and Vjasma, the Rzhev withdrawal in 1943 and the Battle of Kursk where it took very heavy casualties.

Late 1944 saw the division with Ninth Army in the area of the Pripet Marshes, but the successful Soviet advances during their summer offensives, Operation Bagration and the Lvov-Sandomierz Operation, saw German forces steadily retreating; after a series of fierce defensive battles, the 292nd Infantry Division finally crossed the defense line of the River Narew on 5 September 1944.

Facing the 2nd Belorussian Front on the Narew during the Soviet East Prussian Operation, the division was decimated during a series of defensive actions starting on 14 January. In ten days it was forced back over the border of East Prussia, and cut off from its parent formation, Second Army; by 2 February it had reached Heilsberg, where it was nearly surrounded, but continued to conduct a fighting retreat (though reduced to Kampfgruppe level) along with the remainder of Fourth Army trapped in the Heiligenbeil pocket. The division was finally destroyed in the fight for the town of Heiligenbeil, which fell on 25 March. The survivors were absorbed in the German 170th Infantry Division, a few being evacuated over the Frisches Haff.

== Commanders ==
- Lieutenant-General Martin Dehmel (6 February 1940)
- Lieutenant-General Willy Seeger (29 September 1941)
- Lieutenant-General Curt Badinski (August 1942)
- Lieutenant-General Wolfgang von Kluge (September 1942)
- Lieutenant-General Richard John (20 July 1943)
- Major-General Johannes Gittner (30 June 1944)
- Lieutenant-General Rudolf Reichert (October 1944)
