= Rudolf Reichert =

- Born: 24 November 1893; Nebra, Province of Saxony, Prussia, German Empire
- Died: 10 March 1967 (aged 73); Bremen, West Germany
- Military career
- Allegiance: German Empire (to 1918); Weimar Republic (to 1933); Nazi Germany
- Branch: Army (Wehrmacht)
- Service years: 1912–1945
- Rank: Generalleutnant
- Commands: 292nd Infantry Division
- Conflicts: World War I World War II
- Awards: Knight's Cross of the Iron Cross

Rudolf Reichert (24 November 1893 – 10 March 1967) was a general in the Wehrmacht of Nazi Germany. He was a recipient of the Knight's Cross of the Iron Cross.

== Awards and decorations ==
- Knight's Cross of the Iron Cross on 11 March 1945 as Generalmajor and commander of the 292. Infanterie-Division

Military offices
Preceded by Generalmajor Johannes Gittner	Commander of 292. Infanterie-Division; October 1944 – 8 May 1945	Succeeded by None
