= Operation Astonia =

Allied liberation of Le Havre in WW2

- Part of The Western Front in the Second World War
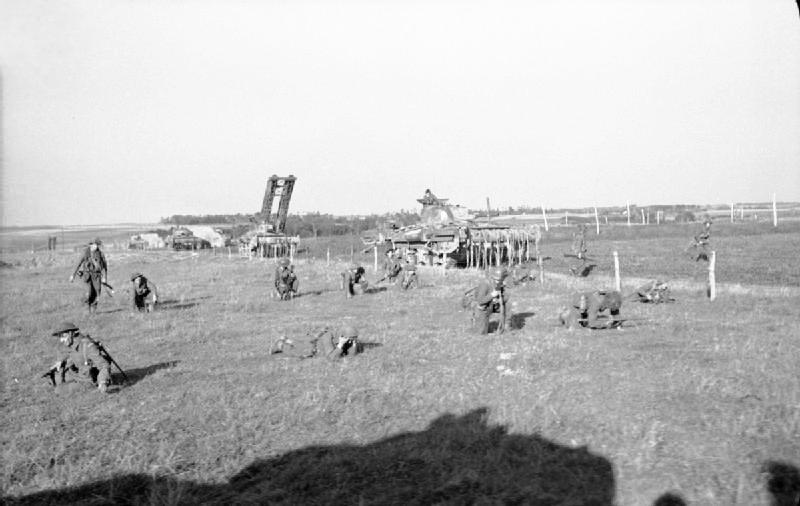
- Churchill bridgelayers, Shermans and infantry following the assault on Le Havre, 13 September 1944
Date	10–12 September 1944
Location	Le Havre, Normandy, France 49°29′N 00°06′E
Result	Allied victory

Belligerents
United Kingdom; Canada	Germany

Commanders and leaders
(United Kingdom) Evelyn Barker (United Kingdom) Tom Rennie (Canada) Harry Crerar	(Nazi Germany) Hermann-Eberhard Wildermuth (surrendered)

Strength
I Corps; 49th Infantry Division; 51st Infantry Division; 79th Armoured Division; 1st Armoured Carrier Regiment	Fortress cadre unit: 226th Infantry Division; 245th Infantry Division; battalion, Security Regiment 5; marines and naval personnel

Casualties and losses
388–500; 40 armoured vehicles	600 killed 11,300 captured
- 2,000 French civilians killed

Operation Astonia was the code name for an Allied attack on the German-held Channel port of Le Havre in France, during the Second World War. The city had been declared a Festung (fortress) by Hitler, to be held to the last man. Fought from 10 to 12 September 1944, the Allied objective was to secure the harbour facilities intact, to deliver supplies to the Allied armies in Continental Europe.

From 26 August, Royal Navy ships and Royal Air Force aircraft carried out a blockade and an extensive preparatory bombardment of the city, which killed over 2,000 civilians and 19 German troops. The land attack was carried out by British infantry, aided by specialist armoured vehicles from the 79th Armoured Division, including Canadian troops. The German garrison of about 11,000 men surrendered on 12 September; the port was badly damaged but it was re-opened on 9 October.

== Background ==
=== Invasion of Normandy ===
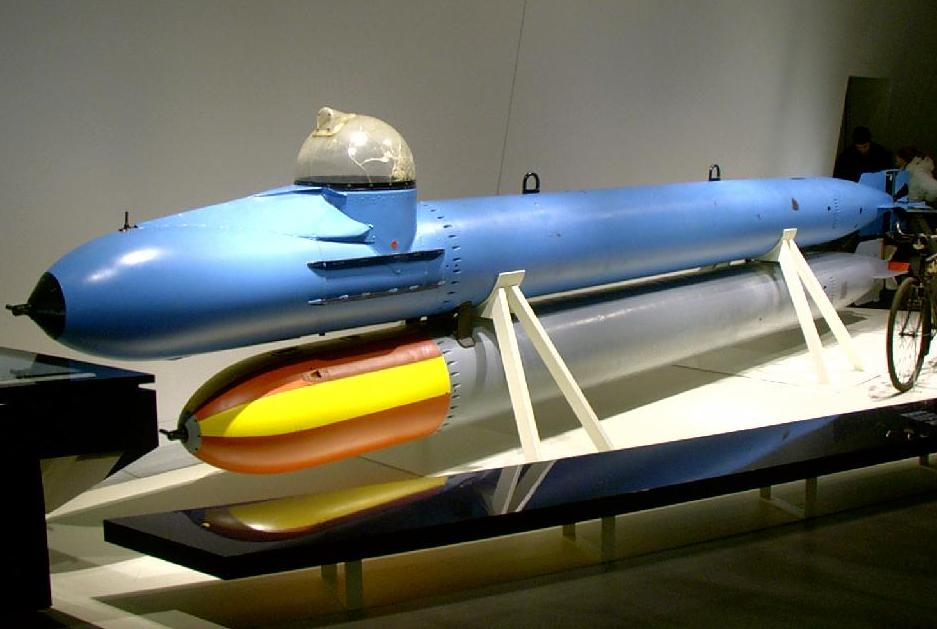
Neger midget submarine

On D-Day, 6 June 1944, Allied troops landed in Normandy on the north coast of France in Operation Overlord and began the liberation of France. On D-Day, Allied aircraft laid a smoke screen off Le Havre to blind the coastal artillery; a torpedo-boat flotilla and a flotilla of patrol ships sailed from the port, using the smoke for camouflage. The German boats managed to fire 15 torpedoes off the Orne at 05:30, hit and sink HNoMS Svenner and forced several other ships to take evasive action. (Note: In June 1944, the chief of Kriegsmarine Group Command West (Admiral Theodor Krancke) had five torpedo boats, 50 minesweepers and 21 patrol vessels at Le Havre.)

On 6 July, Allied ships reported an "unusual object" passing through the Trout line, the eastern flank of the invasion area. Fired on, the object launched a torpedo and sailed away. More unusual objects were seen soon afterwards and were also fired on. The devices managed to sink two minesweepers for a loss of nine sunk and fifteen losses from all causes of the 26 that had sailed from Le Havre; it was later found that they were Neger midget submarines of the K-Verband (Small Battle Units). On the night of 7/8 July, 21 Neger left Le Havre and all were sunk, most of their operators being killed, for one British minesweeper sunk and the Polish cruiser ORP Dragon damaged and scuttled off Sword Beach.

=== June–August ===
RAF Bomber Command attacked Le Havre in the evening of 14 June. Twenty-two 617 Squadron Lancaster bombers and Mosquito target markers went first, dropping Tallboy bombs on the E-boat (Schnellboot, S-Boot [fast boat]) pens with one Tallboy penetrating the roof. The Dambusters were followed by 228 more Lancasters and three hours later a second wave of 116 aircraft arrived, with 1,880 long tons (1,910 t) of bombs, hitting the port and anti-aircraft gun positions. The operation was the largest day raid by Bomber Command since the war began.

By coincidence, the anti-aircraft guns at Le Havre had been prohibited from firing to protect Luftwaffe aircraft in the area. The bombs killed about 1,000 marines, demoralizing the survivors and destroying about 15,000 long tons (15,000 t) of shipping. Losses comprised nine E-boats of the 5th Flotilla and the 9th Flotilla sunk, two seriously damaged and one slightly damaged; three of the five torpedo boats in port sunk, twenty minesweepers and patrol boats sunk and nineteen tugs sunk; several auxiliary vessels were also lost and eight other vessels were damaged.

Admiral Theodor Krancke, then Chief of Kriegsmarine Group Command West, called the raid a catastrophe, writing in his war diary, "It will be hardly possible to carry out the operations planned... since yesterday's attack on Le Havre". Some E-boats reached Le Havre in mid-June but by the end of July, only six E-boats on the channel coast were operational. The Royal Navy formed the Support Squadron Eastern Flank, a group of small gun-armed vessels, which came inshore during the day to bombard land targets and patrolled offshore at night. The squadron fought many engagements with E-boats and K-Verband; on the night of 2/3 August, the Germans sent twenty Linsen (explosive motor boat) sorties, over fifty Marder (midget submarines) and several E-boat attacks with new Dackel TIIId circling torpedoes. Most of the German craft were sunk. The night sorties by E-boats transferred to Le Havre after D-Day sank a Motor Torpedo Boat, two Landing Ship, Tank, three merchant ships, two landing craft and two tugs; six E-boats were sunk and ten damaged in the actions.

=== Festung Le Havre ===
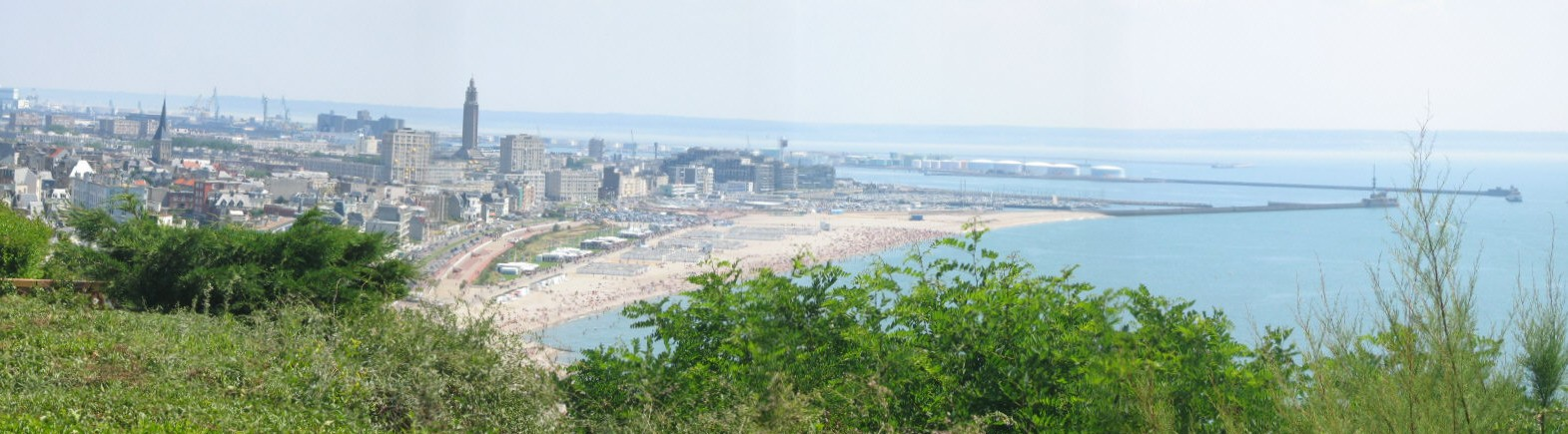
Le Havre in 2005

Le Havre was the most important of the Channel Ports and second only to Marseille amongst French ports for tonnage capacity, having 8 mi (13 km) of quays capable of receiving ocean-going ships. In Operation Maple from early April, British aircraft and ships laid mines off Le Havre and the ports further north, which closed the port for long periods. In early September 1944, German troops of the 15th Army (General Gustav-Adolf von Zangen) occupied a swathe of coastal territory from the port to Bruges, which had been under attack by the First Canadian Army since the start of September.

The port had water on three sides, the Channel to the west, the valley of the Lézarde River to the east, and to the south by the Seine estuary and the Canal de Tancarville. North of Le Havre, the ground rises steeply to high ground as far as the cliffs of Cap de la Hève and the coast to the north. The Lézarde and Fontaine river valleys cut the area into two plateaux, the north plateau being between the rivers and the south plateau to the south and west of the Fontaine, which overlooks the port; 3 mi (4.8 km) inland the south plateau is covered by the Fôret de Montgeon.

The Germans had dug an anti-tank ditch from the Lézarde valley past Montivilliers to the coast at Octeville-sur-Mer, covered by minefields, barbed wire, and concrete defensive positions. At the crest of the southern plateau, two fortified positions covered the town and port entrance and the Grand Clos coastal artillery battery could engage approaching ships. The garrison had 115 guns, plenty of machine-guns and mortars (many of its anti-tank guns were sent to Normandy before September and lost), and ammunition and supplies for 14,000 men for ninety days.

Near Fontaine-la-Mallet lay Strongpoint 8, with several concrete gun emplacements, the first of a series to cover the northern approaches to the port. The minefields and tank obstacles had been hurriedly built and were superimposed on an earlier and unfinished scheme based on strongpoints. West of Strongpoint 8 the ground is unsuitable for tanks but from the strongpoint to the Lézarde the ground is flat and unobstructed, with a gentle 200 yd (180 m)-slope on either side, the plateaux on both sides being at the same height as the strongpoint, which commanded the stream. The anti-tank ditch was V-shaped, 22 ft (6.7 m) wide at the top and more than 12 ft (3.7 m) deep but not continuous.

=== Crossing the Seine ===
Allied invasion plans required that the First Canadian Army (General Harry Crerar) on the left flank of the 21st Army Group (General Bernard Montgomery) should cross the Seine downstream of Rouen and turn into the Le Havre peninsula to make northward flanking manoeuvres to capture Le Havre and its railway connections, Dieppe, Calais and Dunkirk, for the Allied supply effort. On the night of 26/27 August, the crossing of the Seine by the First Canadian Army began and Rouen was captured on 30 August. I Corps improvised means to get over the lower Seine, which was not bridged and II Canadian Corps did the same further upriver. The two corps were ordered to capture Le Havre and Dieppe respectively and then clear the coastal belt up to Bruges.

The German 7th Army was ordered to abandon the lower Seine, by 31 August the 15th Army was to hold a line from Dieppe to Neufchâtel; the speed of the Allied advance forced a further German retreat eastwards to the Somme. In Operation Fusillade, Dieppe was entered unopposed by the 2nd Canadian Division on 1 September and the 51st Highland Infantry Division walked into St-Valery, four years after most of the original Highland Division had been forced to surrender there. The Highlanders joined the 49th (West Riding) Infantry Division outside Le Havre on 4 September. As the Canadian Army prepared its attack on Le Havre, the seaward approaches were blockaded closely by the Allies navies from 26 August; the port was the most westerly still in German possession, and the Kriegsmarine tried to run supplies in and get out the ships still afloat. During the next four nights convoys departing Le Havre were attacked and a few ships managed to slip away; nine ships were sunk and by 30 August the port was empty.

== Prelude ==
=== German defences ===
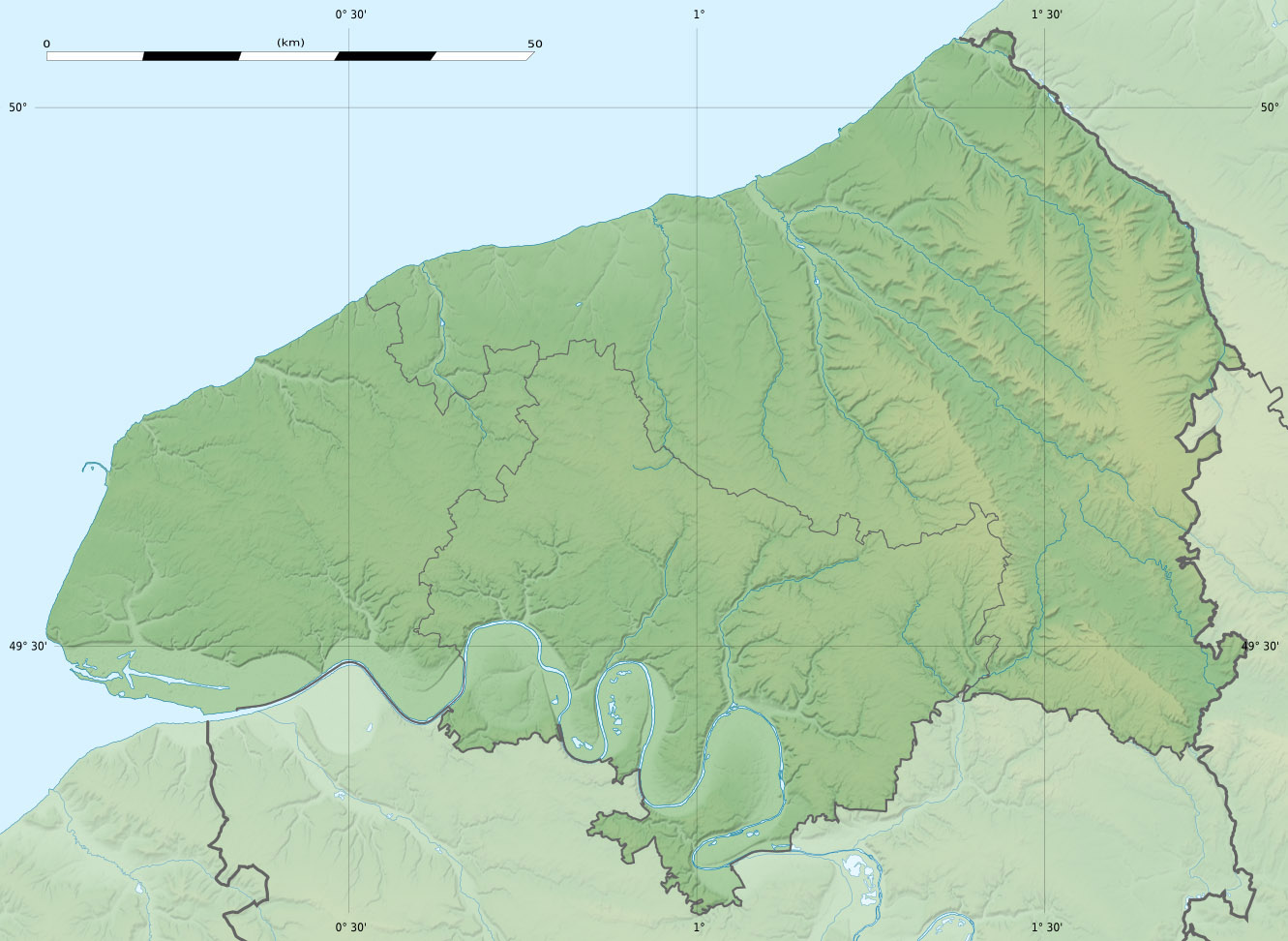
Relief map of Le Havre and the Pays de Caux

On 14 August 1944, Colonel Hermann-Eberhard Wildermuth took command of the fortress and later put the effective strength of the garrison at around 8,000 men, from a total of more than 11,000 personnel. Wildermuth had a Festungs Stamm Abteilung (fortress cadre unit) elements of the 226th Infantry Division and 245th Infantry Division; a battalion of Security Regiment 5, marines and some naval personnel. About 50,000 French civilians remained in the port from the normal population of about 160,000 people. On 9 September, Wildermuth ordered that infantry attacks were to be resisted even with pistols, but when tanks attacked, strongpoints which had no anti-tank guns could surrender; rather than fight to the last man, the garrison was to resist until the last anti-tank gun.

Before the attack, the defenders were given an ultimatum and called upon to surrender; Wildermuth countered by requesting that civilians should be evacuated, given that his orders from Hitler were to hold Festung Le Havre to the last man. According to Wildermuth, many of the civilians were reluctant to leave, even when forced; some Resistance groups opposed evacuation, and there were concerns of a recurrence of the looting that had occurred in 1940. Major E.S. Scott, the 49th (West Riding) Infantry Division GS0 II, who was present at the parley on 3 September and the division intelligence officer, Major D. R. C. Engleheart, said that Wildermuth refused to surrender or to allow French civilians to pass through his lines. He was given 48 hours to change his mind, but still refused. "Any suggestion, from whatever source", Scott said, "that the British High Command vetoed the evacuation of civilians before the battle is totally without any foundation".

=== Allied preparations ===
A naval and air bombardment was planned to soften up the Le Havre fortifications. The battleship HMS Warspite and the monitor HMS Erebus, bombarded the port with more than 4,000 long tons (4,100 t) of shells over several days. On 5 September, Erebus was forced temporarily out of action by a hit from the Grand Clos battery, which had one 14.8 in (380 mm) and two 6.7 in (170 mm) guns; the port defences also had 44 medium and field guns and 32 anti-aircraft guns. (Note: Some guns were French or Czech which made ammunition supply awkward.)

The Bomber Command day attack on 5 September was the first of seven raids. On the night of 6/7 September, a similar number of aircraft attacked and another day raid was flown on 8 September by 109 aircraft; a raid on 9 September had to be cancelled because of bad weather but the sorties flown delivered about 4,000 long tons (4,100 t) of bombs. On 10 September, about sixty bombers attacked the Grand Clos battery, followed by a bombardment from Warspite and Erebus, the combined efforts of which put the German guns out of action. Bomber Command returned in the afternoon and dropped another 4,900 long tons (5,000 t) of bombs, as the British divisional artillery and the 4th Army Group Royal Artillery (AGRA) and the 9th AGRA conducted counter-flak bombardments during the raids.

Before the ground attack, the RAF flew 1,863 Lancaster and Halifax heavy bomber sorties and dropped 9,631 long tons (9,786 t) of bombs. The air and naval bombardments killed about 2,000 French civilians and 19 Germans. (Note: William Douglas-Home, a British liaison officer refused an order to participate in the operation, because he objected to the United Nations' unconditional surrender policy. He was court martialled for his refusal of a lawful order. Cashiered and sentenced to one year's hard labour, he was imprisoned in HMP Wormwood Scrubs and HMP Wakefield and was released on 5 June 1945. A report of his trial appeared in the Maidenhead Advertiser.) Subsequent investigation showed that the aerial bombardment succeeded in knocking out only 8 of the 76 German gun positions. The covered positions were very well protected, with up to 3 ft (0.91 m) of reinforced concrete, and even a direct hit might have had little effect.

=== Allied plan ===
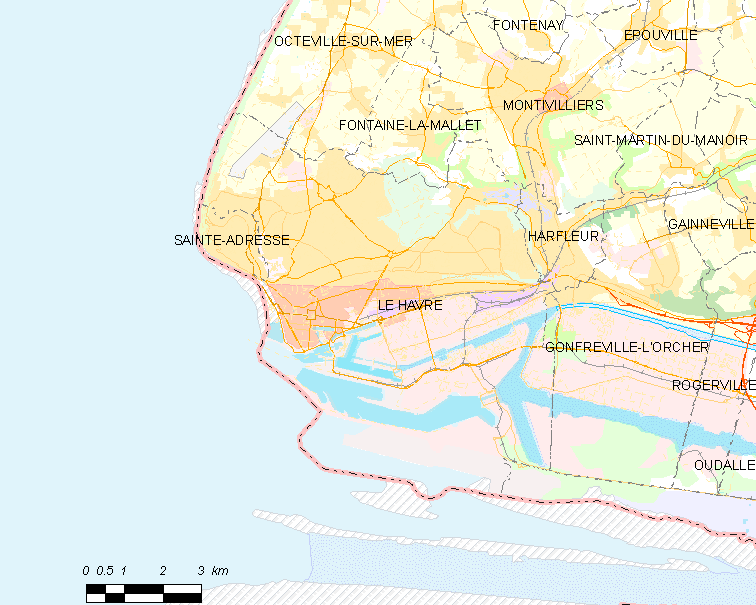
Modern map of Le Havre (commune FR insee code 76351)

During the North-west Europe Campaign (6 June 1944 – 8 May 1945), British specialist tanks were held in the 79th Armoured Division (Major-General Percy Hobart) and attached to other units for particular operations. (Note: The division contained vehicles not derived from Infantry tanks, including two regiments of Kangaroo armoured infantry carriers, amphibious Sherman DD tanks, Landing Vehicle Tracked (Buffalo) and Terrapin amphibious landing vehicles.) For Astonia, the 79th Armoured Division provided the 49th (West Riding) Infantry Division with the 222nd Assault Squadron RE (AVRE), two Crab squadrons of the 22nd Dragoons and a Crocodile squadron of the 141st Regiment Royal Armoured Corps (141 RAC). The division also had the 34th Armoured Brigade and the 1st Canadian Armoured Carrier Regiment with 44 Kangaroos under command.

In the I Corps plan, phase I had the 49th (West Riding) Infantry Division breaking through on the northern front capture strongpoints to the south and cross the Fontaine. In phase IIa the Highlanders would break through on the right and in IIb the 49th (West Riding) Infantry Division was to capture the southern plateau. In phase III the Highlanders would take the ground around Octeville and the heights north of Le Havre and in phase IV, all forces were to exploit opportunities to capture the town.

== Assault ==
=== 10 September ===
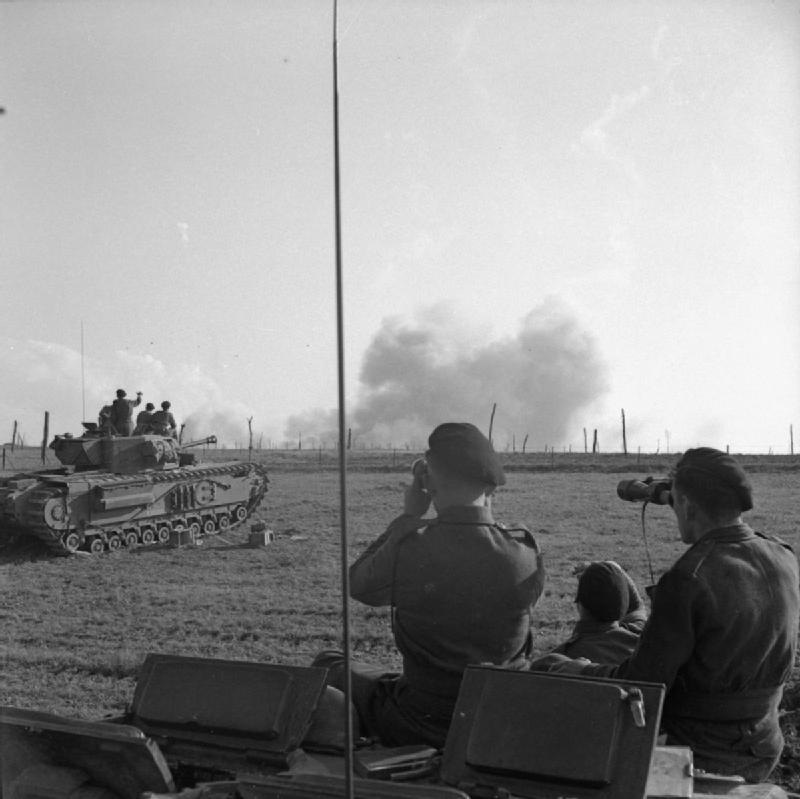
Churchill tank crews watch the RAF bomb the defences of Le Havre, 10 September 1944

East of Strongpoint 8 the ditch was near the top of the slope down to the stream, with the minefield in front. The 56th Infantry Brigade (Brigadier M. S. Ekin) was to conduct the attack on the 49th (West Riding) Infantry Division front. The attack plan was to penetrate the German defences to allow further forces to attack, then further these gains and capture the city. An assault of two divisions began at 17:45 hours on 10 September, with naval bombardment vessels engaging the coastal batteries defending the port and RAF bombers dropping an additional 5,000 long tons (5,100 t) of bombs ninety minutes before zero hour.

With the assistance of specialist units from the 79th Armoured Division and the 1st Canadian Armoured Carrier Regiment, such as Kangaroos and Sherman Crab vehicles, the first part of the assault proceeded swiftly, with gaps cleared through the minefield and anti-tank ditches breached. The 49th (West Riding) Infantry Division penetrated the north-eastern section of the Le Havre perimeter first, followed by the 51st (Highland) Infantry Division attacking on their right from the north. The assault was costly for the specialised armour, the heavy rains making river banks much soggier than the plateaux, slowing flails and other vehicles at their most vulnerable. 79th Armoured Division losing 34 Crab anti-mine flail tanks, two command tanks and 6 Armoured Vehicle Royal Engineers (AVRE) vehicles.

=== 11–12 September ===
On the second day, the attack continued with support from Hawker Typhoons and armoured vehicles; facing the threat of Churchill Crocodile flame-throwing tanks, the last outer defence strongpoints surrendered at 14:00 hours. On the third day of the assault the town centre was cleared by the infantry of both divisions, forcing the German garrison commander's official surrender at 11:45, 12 September; 11,300 German troops were captured and interned as prisoners of war.

== Aftermath ==
=== Analysis ===
Despite the weather, Allied bombing greatly hampered the German defence of the port; the final attack, just before the Allied ground operation began on 10 September, prompted by the experience of Operation Charnwood, caused much disorganisation among the defenders. The attack was a model of a combined operation in which the British advantage in set-piece attacks backed by massed firepower, was efficiently exploited. Much emphasis had been placed on maintaining the momentum of the attack, the usual caution in attack being relaxed to exploit any sign that the defenders were collapsing.

Wildermuth claimed that his lack of anti-tank guns had prevented a long defence of the port but other prisoners said that the Russian front was less of an ordeal than the bombing. Allied and German forces at Calais and Boulogne allowed civilians to be evacuated before they were attacked; Dunkirk was masked and remained in German hands until Germany surrendered on 8 May 1945.

=== Casualties ===
In the British official history, Lionel Ellis recorded the capture of 11,300 German prisoners for fewer than 500 Allied casualties. In 1960, Charles Perry Stacey, the Canadian official historian, gave 11,302 prisoners and 388 casualties in I Corps. In 2014, John Plant wrote that the 22nd Dragoons lost 29 of its 33 flail tanks and two command tanks, the 222nd Assault Squadron lost five AVRE and that six tanks were lost by the 7th RTR but that most of the damage had been caused by mines and was repairable; only eleven of the 22nd Dragoons losses were write-offs. In February 1945, the municipality of Le Havre assessed casualties from the September bombings at 1,536 dead and 517 missing.

=== Base development ===
On 11 September the Deputy G–4 for Movements and Transportation at SHAEF, Major General Charles Napier, recommended that Le Havre be assigned to the American Communications Zone (COMZ). Le Havre was 200 miles (320 km) closer to the front line than the Brittany ports, and it was estimated that every 5,000 long tons (5,100 t) landed at Le Havre could save the equivalent of seventy quartermaster truck companies. It was the second largest port in France before the war, but it had been heavily damaged by German demolitions and Allied land, sea and aerial bombardment. Le Havre was to be developed as an interim port capable of handling 8,000 to 10,000 long tons (8,100 to 10,200 t) per day. This was to be done as rapidly as possible, with the minimum amount of reconstruction effort.

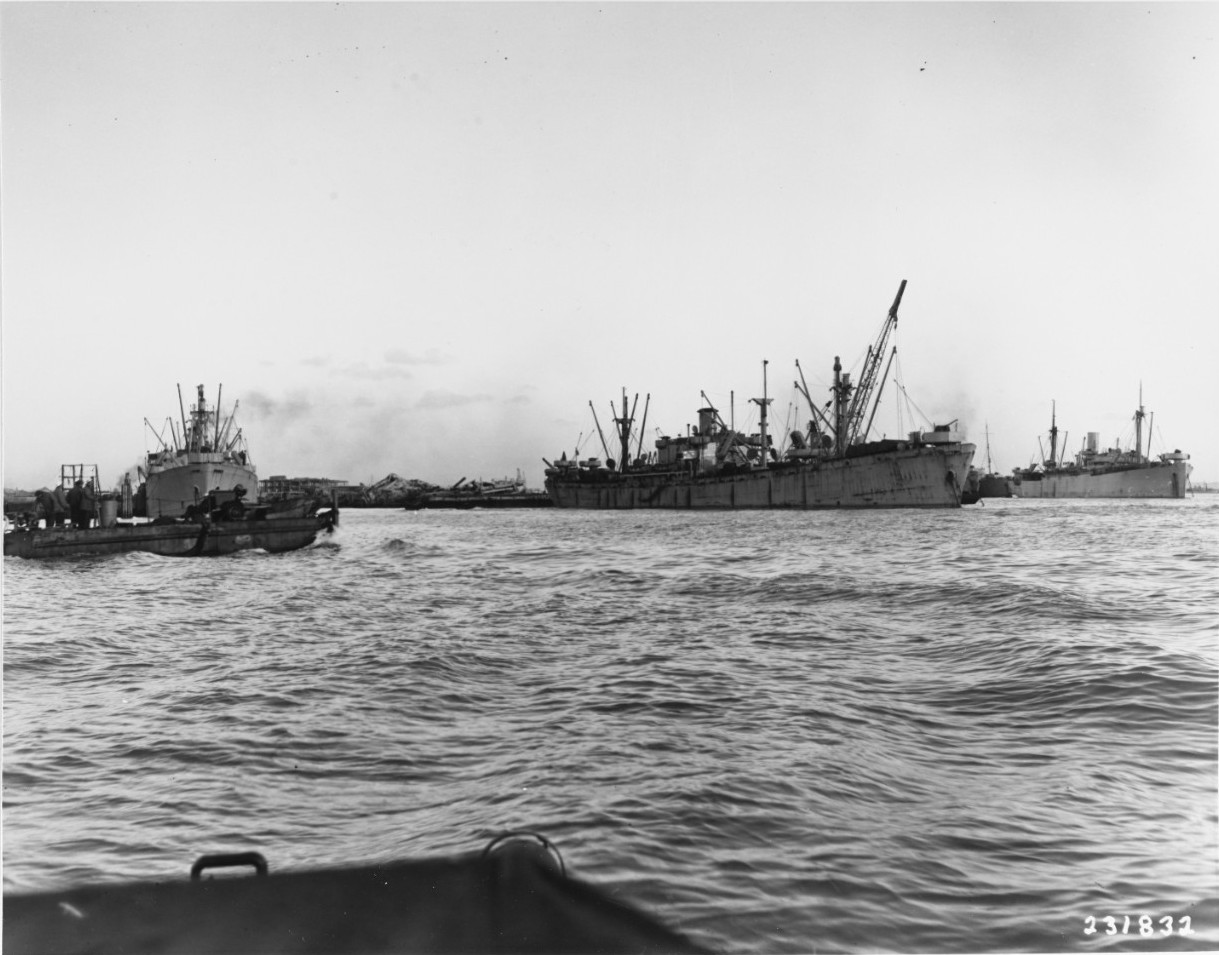
Liberty Ships and other freighters in Le Havre Harbor on 18 November 1944

The first Liberty ships entered the inner harbor on 19 September, but sea mines and obstructions limited the docks to landing craft and coasters. The USS Miantonomah brought port clearance supplies on 21 September, but on departure four days later it struck a mine and sank. Not until 13 October was the first Liberty ship able to dock. The damaged Rochemont lock gates subjected the quay walls to damage from hydrostatic pressure of the 25 to 40 feet (7.6 to 12.2 m) tides. After several unsuccessful attempts to repair them in place, the 1055th Port Construction and Repair Group removed the gates, repaired them in the dry dock, and completed their reinstallation on 30 November. This reduced the tidal range in the wet basins by 20 ft (6.1 m). The first Liberty ship passed through the lock on 16 December.

The number of berths that the logisticians felt was necessary were never developed, so the port depended on DUKWs and lighters. In the first quarter of 1945, seven DUKW companies handled 35.2 percent of the cargo; quayside discharges accounted for 23.3 percent, and lighters handled the rest. Nonetheless, the port exceeded expectations, handling 9,500 long tons (9,700 t) per day by the end of December. That month, the port dispatched 92 trains carrying ammunition to the forward areas in response to the German Ardennes offensive. By the year's end, the 16th Major Port and some 4,000 French civilian stevedores had unloaded 434,920 long tons (441,900 t) of cargo. In 1945 the work force was augmented with 6,000 German prisoners of war. The port set a record of 198,768 long tons (201,958 t) in January 1945, and by the end of May had unloaded 1,254,129 long tons (1,274,254 t).

In addition to handling cargo Le Havre also became an important debarkation point for American troops. In January 1945 the Red Horse Staging Area was established in the area. Troops debarked over a long steel ponton pier and a troopship berth at the Quai d'Escale. Arrivals peaked at 247,607 troops in March 1945.

== Bibliography ==
- Beck, Alfred M.; Bortz, Abe; Lynch, Charles W.; Mayo, Lida; Weld, Ralph F. (1985). The Corps of Engineers: The War Against Germany (PDF). United States Army in World War II – The Technical Services. Washington, DC: Center of Military History, United States Army. OCLC 40485571. Archived from the original (PDF) on September 27, 2012.
- Brown, David (1990). Warship Losses of World War Two. London: Arms and Armour. ISBN 978-0-85368-802-0.
- Buckley, John (2014) [2013]. Monty's Men: The British Army and the Liberation of Europe (pbk. ed.). London: Yale University Press. ISBN 978-0-300-20534-3.
- Bykofsky, Joseph; Larson, Harold (1957). The Transportation Corps: Operations Overseas (PDF). United States Army In World War II – The Technical Services. Washington, DC: Center of Military History, United States Army. OCLC 867377092. Archived from the original (PDF) on September 27, 2012.
- Copp, Terry (2006). Cinderella Army: The Canadians in Northwest Europe, 1944–1945. University of Toronto Press. ISBN 978-0-8020-3925-5.
- Doherty, R. (2004). Normandy 1944: The Road to Victory. Staplehurst: Spellmount. ISBN 978-1-86227-224-8.
- Ellis, Major L. F.; et al. (2004a) [1962]. Butler, J. R. M. (ed.). Victory in the West: The Battle of Normandy. History of the Second World War United Kingdom Military Series. Vol. I (repr. Naval & Military Press, Uckfield ed.). London: HMSO. ISBN 978-1-84574-058-0.
- Ellis, L. F.; et al. (2004) [1968]. Butler, Sir James (ed.). Victory in the West: The Defeat of Germany. History of the Second World War, United Kingdom Military Series. Vol. II (pbk. repr. Naval & Military Press Uckfield, UK ed.). London: HMSO. ISBN 978-1-84574-059-7.
- Gooderson, Ian (1998). Air power at the Battlefront: Allied Close Air Support in Europe, 1943-45. Studies in Air Power. London: F. Cass. ISBN 0-7146-4680-6. OCLC 36858112.
- Hinsley, F. H. (1994) [1993]. British Intelligence in the Second World War. Its influence on Strategy and Operations (abridged). History of the Second World War (2nd rev. ed.). London: HMSO. ISBN 978-0-11-630961-7.
- Knapp, Andrew (November 2007). "The Destruction and Liberation of Le Havre in Modern Memory". War in History. 14 (4): 476–498. JSTOR 26069890.
- Luckhurst, Tim; Phippen, Lesley (2016). "The Playwright Who Dramatised His Own War Record: a Reassessment of William Douglas Home's Accounts of His Refusal to Fight for the Liberation of Le Havre". Contemporary British History. 30 (3): 389–406. doi:10.1080/13619462.2016.1144512.
- Montgomery, Field Marshal Bernard (1961) [1947]. Normandy to the Baltic. Grey Arrow. Arrow Books. OCLC 65624728.
- Morison, Samuel Eliot (1957). The Invasion of France and Germany. History of United States Naval Operations in World War II. Vol. XI. Boston: Little, Brown and Company. OCLC 671874345.
- Plant, J. (2014). Infantry Tank Warfare (rev. enl. ed.). London: New Generation. ISBN 978-1-78507-158-4.
- Roskill, S. W. (1998) [1960]. The Navy at War 1939–1945 (Wordsworth, London ed.). Annapolis, Maryland: United States Naval Institute. ISBN 978-1-85326-697-3.
- Ruppenthal, Roland G. (1959). Logistical Support of the Armies (PDF). United States Army in World War II – The European Theater of Operations. Vol. II. Washington, DC: Center of Military History, United States Army. OCLC 8743709. Archived from the original (PDF) on September 27, 2012.
- Saunders, H. St George; Richards, D. (1975) [1954]. Royal Air Force 1939–45: The Fight is Won. Vol. III (pbk. ed.). London: HMSO. ISBN 978-0-11-771594-3.
- Shulman, Milton (2003) [1947]. Defeat in the West (repr. Cassell Military Paperbacks ed.). London: Martin Secker & Warburg. ISBN 978-0-304-36603-3.
- Stacey, C. P.; Bond, C. C. J. (1960). The Victory Campaign: The operations in North-West Europe 1944–1945 (PDF). Official History of the Canadian Army in the Second World War. Vol. III (online scan ed.). The Queen's Printer and Controller of Stationery Ottawa. OCLC 606015967. Archived from the original (PDF) on 21 December 2020.
- Webster, C.; Frankland, N. (1994) [1961]. Butler, J. R. M. (ed.). The Strategic Air Offensive against Germany 1939–1945. History of the Second World War United Kingdom Military series. Vol. III. Part 5 (Imperial War Museum and Battery Press ed.). London: HMSO. ISBN 978-0-89839-205-0.
