= Battle of the Crna Bend (1917) =

Battle during the First World War

- Part of Macedonian front (World War I)
Date	5–9 May 1917
Location	River Crna bend, Bulgarian-occupied Kingdom of Serbia (present-day North Macedonia)
Result	Central Powers victory

Belligerents
Bulgaria; Germany	France; Italy; Russia

Commanders and leaders
(German Empire) H. von Ziegesar; (German Empire) Karl Suren	(French Third Republic) Georges Lebouc; (French Third Republic) Paul Grossetti; (Kingdom of Italy) Giuseppe Pennella; (Russian Empire) Mikhail Dieterichs

Strength
Central Powers: (Tsardom of Bulgaria (1908–1946)) 27 battalions; 19 batteries; 115 machine guns; (German Empire) 13 battalions; 15 batteries; 131 machine guns; Total: 40 battalions; 34 batteries (122 guns, 8 mortars); 246 machine guns	Allies: (French Third Republic) 45 battalions; 54 batteries; 312 machine guns; (Kingdom of Italy) 18 battalions; 32 batteries; 171 machine guns; (Russian Empire) 6 battalions; 14 batteries; 32 machine guns; Total: 69 battalions; 100 batteries (412 guns); 515 machine guns

Casualties and losses
(Tsardom of Bulgaria (1908–1946)) 1,626; (German Empire) Unknown	(French Third Republic) 1,700; (Kingdom of Italy) 2,400; (Russian Empire) 1,325; Total: 5,425

The Battle of the Crna Bend was a significant military engagement fought between the forces of the Central Powers and the Entente in May 1917. It was part of the Allied Spring Offensive of the same year that was designed to break the stalemate on the Macedonian Front. Despite the considerable numerical and material advantage of the attackers over the defenders, the Bulgarian and German defence of the positions in the bend of the River Crna remained a formidable obstacle, which the Allies were unable to defeat not only in 1917 but until the end of the war.

== Background ==
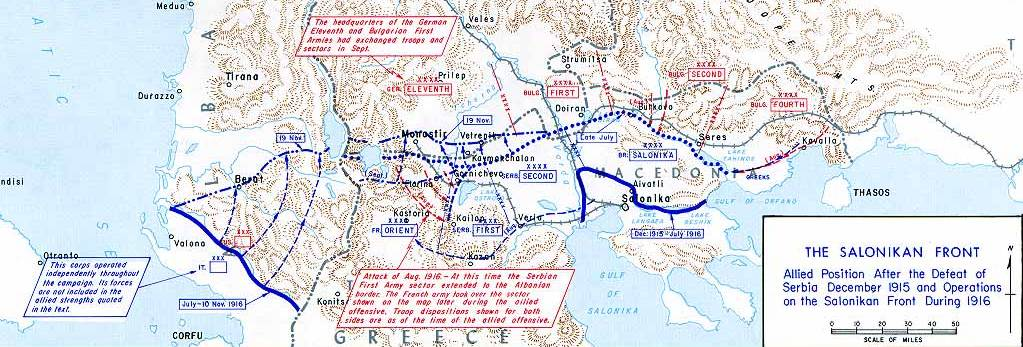
Military operations on the Macedonian Front in 1916

With the onset of the winter of 1916, all military operations on the Macedonian Front abruptly ended. The three-month-long Monastir offensive provided the Allies with only limited tactical successes, but it failed to knock Bulgaria out of the war by a combined attack of General Sarrail's forces and the Romanian Army. On a strategic level, the overall result of the offensive was that it managed to keep over half of the Bulgarian Army and few German units on the Macedonian Front. On the tactical level, the front line was moved in favour of the Allies by only about 50 km in the Sector of General Winkler's 11th German-Bulgarian Army. However, by the end of November, the Bulgarians and Germans were able to firmly establish themselves on the Chervena Stena – height 1248 – Hill 1050 – Dabica – Gradešnica defensive line and subsequently repel all Allied attempts to dislodge them of their positions. This brought about the stabilization of the entire front line and forced the Allies to call off the offensive altogether. The opposing sides could now regroup their exhausted forces and fortify their lines.

The strategic situation in the early spring of 1917 on all European theatres of war, except the Romanian portion of the Eastern Front, favoured implementing the Allied offensive plans adopted during the inter-allied conference of November 1916, held in Chantilly, France. These plans included an offensive on the Macedonian Front designed to support the Allied efforts on the other fronts and, if possible, defeat Bulgaria with the assistance of Russian and Romanian forces. The Bulgarians, on their part, asked the Germans to join an offensive against Salonika with six divisions, but the German High Command refused and forced the adoption of a purely defensive stance of the Central Powers forces on the Balkan Front.

== Preparations ==
=== Allied plan ===
The commander of the Allied armies on the Salonika front General Sarrail, commenced preparations for the offensive as soon as he received his orders. By early spring 1917, he produced a general plan that envisaged a main attack delivered in the Serbian sector by the Serbian 2nd Army and at least two other secondary attacks – the first by the British to the east of the Vardar and the second by the Italians and French in the Crna Bend. French and Greek forces to the west of the Vardar were also to undertake aggressive action. The commander of the French Army of the East, General Paul Grossetti, informed his superior that his forces would need at least 40 days to prepare for the operations, which forced General Sarrail to set the start of the offensive for 12 April 1917. However, the harsh weather conditions soon forced him to change the starting date several times until it was determined that the main British attack should commence on 24 April and the rest on 30 April. In accordance, the British began the 2nd Battle of Doiran according to schedule but were soon forced to call off their attacks as it became clear that the rest of the Allies were not able to deliver their attacks on time. The dates were finally set for 5 May in the Crna Bend and 8 May in the Serbian and British sectors.

In the Crna Bend sector, the planned attack was assigned to the left-right of the French Army of the East – the so-called First Group of Divisions(under the command of General Georges Lebouc) and the Italian Expeditionary Force. Its primary task was to penetrate all Bulgarian and German lines in the direction of the town of Prilep and thus threaten the rear of the Bulgarian forces around the Vardar and Monastir. General Sarrail had surveyed the area and determined that the Italians and French should deliver a frontal assault against almost the entire length of the defensive line, casting doubt about the final success of the operation among the Italian and French commanders. To strengthen the Allies, Sarrail also attached a Russian infantry brigade to the Crna sector forces a few days before the attack.

=== Central Powers plan ===
The Bulgarians and Germans were well aware of the impending Allied offensive, deciding to rely on the strength of their well-prepared fortifications, powerful artillery and machine gun fire while also placing as many troops as possible in the first lines and preparing sufficient reserves in case the Allies achieved a breakthrough and the need for powerful counterattacks arose. The task of the defenders was to preserve their positions at all costs and protect the vital lines of communication running along the Gradsko-Prilep road. By 12 February, the Germans had already launched a successful attack on Italian forces west of Hill 1050 using flamethrowers. Italian counterattacks the next day and on 27 February were only partly successful.

=== Opposing forces ===
==== Central Powers ====
The Crna Bend was considered one of the most important sectors on the Macedonian Front and was always guarded by strong Bulgarian and German units. In 1917 the Central Powers forces in the area were part of the 62nd Corps of the 11th German-Bulgarian Army, both of which were commanded by German generals and staff. The first-line units assigned to the sector were the 302nd Division and the 22nd German-Bulgarian Brigade, along a 23 km front. These forces occupied a generally well-fortified line which was especially strong in the points considered crucial for the defence, such as Hill 1050, Hill 1060, Dabica etc. In such places, defence consisted of complicated networks of trenches protected by several lines of barbed wire that were usually 3–5 meters thick but sometimes reached a thickness of 10–15 meters. In addition, there were good infantry shelters connected by communication trenches. The troops were well supplied with ammunition, and their morale was high.

First-line troops

- 302nd Infantry Division (Hermann von Ziegesar)
  - 2/2 Infantry Brigade – 9 battalions(5,550+ rifles), 32 machine guns
  - 201st Infantry Brigade(German) – 7 battalions, 74 machine guns
  - 3/7 Infantry Brigade – 4 battalions(2800 rifles), 22 machine guns
  - 18th Artillery Regiment – 20 guns
  - 10th Artillery Regiment(German) – 26 guns, 4 mortars
  - Divisional Reserve – 2 battalions(German), 6 machine guns
- 22nd German-Bulgarian Infantry Brigade (von Reuter)
  - 42nd Infantry Regiment(German) – 2 battalions, 39 machine guns
  - 44th Infantry Regiment – 3 battalions(2,600 rifles), 16 machine guns
  - 28th Infantry Regiment – 3 battalions(2,300 rifles), 16 machine guns
  - German Artillery Group – 16 guns
  - Bulgarian Artillery Group – 28 guns
- Total first-line troops – 30 battalions, 205 machine guns, 90 guns

Second-line troops

- 61st Corps Reserve
  - 146th Infantry Regiment(German) – 2 battalions, 12 machine guns
  - Bulgarian and German artillery – 32 guns,

Third-line troops

- Army reserve
  - 2/8 Infantry Brigade – 8 battalions, 29 machine guns

Total troops in the Crna Bend sector – 40 battalions, 246 machine guns, 122 guns

==== Allies ====
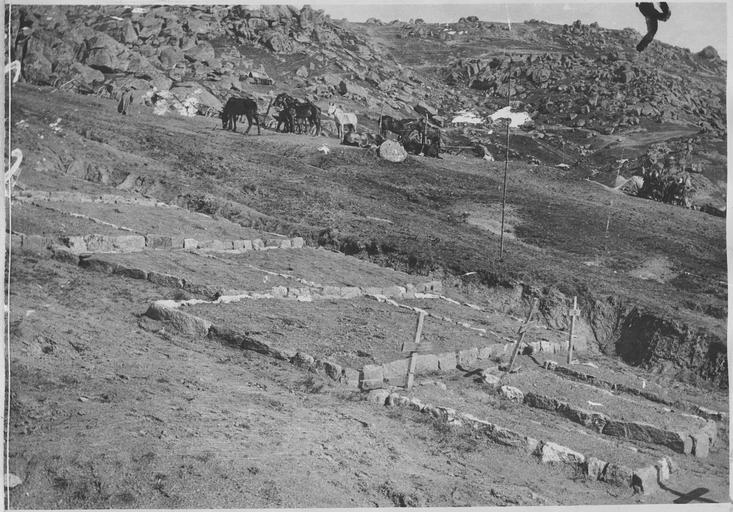
Russian cemetery

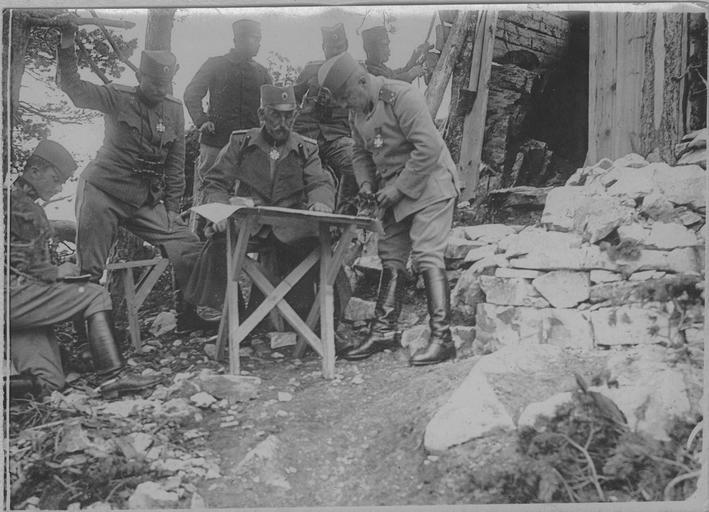
serbian division

Troops of various nationalities occupied the Allied position in the Crna Bend. The western part of the sector was entrusted to the Italian Expeditionary Force, which faced parts of the 302nd division along a 10.5 km front. The sector's remainder was in the hands of the I Group of Divisions, which also had to cover a 10.5 km front line. By the beginning of May, the Allies concentrated a large force of infantry and artillery that outnumbered the Bulgarians and Germans.

First-line troops

- 35th Italian Infantry Division (General Giuseppe Pennella)
  - Sicilia Infantry Brigade – 6 battalions(4,710 rifles), 51 machine guns
  - Ivrea Infantry Brigade – 6 battalions(4,143 rifles), 48 machine guns
  - Cagliari Infantry Brigade – 6 battalions(5,954 rifles), 72 machine guns
  - Artillery – 144 guns
- 16th French Colonial Infantry Division (General Antoine Dessort)
  - 4th Infantry Brigade – 6 battalions, 48 machine guns
  - 32nd Infantry Brigade – 6 battalions, 48 machine guns
  - Artillery – 78 guns
- 2nd Russian Infantry Brigade (Mikhail Dieterichs)
  - 4th Infantry Regiment – 3 battalions, 16 machine guns
  - 3rd Infantry Regiment – 3 battalions, 16 machine guns
  - Artillery – 54 guns
- 17th French Colonial Infantry Division (General Georges Têtart)
  - 33rd Infantry Brigade – 6 battalions, 48 machine guns

- 34th Infantry Brigade – 6 battalions, 48 machine guns

  - Artillery – 50 guns
- Attached heavy Artillery – 46 guns
- Total first-line troops – 48 battalions, 395 machine guns, 372 guns

Second-line troops

- 11th French Colonial Infantry Division (General Jean Paul Sicre)
  - 22nd Infantry Brigade – 6 battalions, 48 machine guns
  - 157th Infantry Regiment – 3 battalions, 24 machine guns
  - African Chasseur Regiment – 3 battalions, ? machine guns
  - Artillery – 8 guns

Third-line troops

- Reserve of the commander-in-chief
  - 30th French Colonial Infantry Division – 9 battalions, 48 machine guns, 32 guns

Total troops in the Crna Bend sector – 69 battalions, c. 515 machine guns, 412 guns

== Battle ==
=== Artillery preparation ===
The Allied command planned to open the battle with an artillery bombardment scheduled for 5 May 1917. On that day 91 Italian and French batteries(372 guns and heavy mortars) opened fire along the entire front of the 302nd Division and the 22nd Brigade. Due to the calm and warm weather, the entire defensive line was soon engulfed in a cloud of smoke and dust. The barrage lasted the entire day and had mixed effects, depending on the ground and strength of the fortifications it pointed at. This was the case in the sector of the 302nd division, where the Bulgarian 2/2nd Infantry Brigade was defending lines situated in a flat plain, and the shelters were not enough for all the soldiers. By contrast, the bombardment hardly fazed the German 201st Infantry Brigade, which occupied the important hills 1020 and 1050. Its infantry benefited from the rugged terrain and the excellent shelters, which were, in some cases, dug in the solid rock. The Allied artillery fire in the Bulgarian 3/7 Infantry Brigade's sector caused serious damage to part of the barbed wire and collapsed several infantry shelters. Von Reuter's troops were also exposed to the heavy bombardment and had some of their first-line trenches and barbed wire severely damaged. The Allied artillery on this part of the front was forced to pause its barrage for some time in the afternoon due to the appearance of German fighter aircraft and the destruction of one of their observation balloons. With the coming of the night, the Allied fire was significantly reduced in intensity, which gave a chance to the defenders to repair part of the inflicted damage.

At 6:00 on 6 May, the Allied artillery renewed its bombardment and continued in the same manner as the day before throughout the entire day. However, this time the Italians, French and Russians also sent patrols to check the effect of the bombardment on the Bulgarian-German lines and test the strength of the fortifications. The Bulgarians and Germans managed to hold off their attempts to close on their lines with powerful infantry and artillery fire. On this day, the Central Powers' artillery took a more active part in the battle and often engaged in counter-infantry and counter-battery work with the help of German reconnaissance planes. By the end of the day, the Allied artillery once again reduced the intensity of its fire.

On the morning of 7 May, the Allies once again renewed their bombardment. On this day, the barrage was even harsher than the previous days, and the Italian and French guns fired more than 15,000 shells on the lines of the Bulgarian 2/2nd Infantry Brigade alone. Stronger reconnaissance patrols were dispatched but were once again held off by the Bulgarians and Germans, who answered by sending their patrols to determine whether the Allies were preparing for a significant infantry attack. The results of the three-day artillery barrage proved unsatisfactory, and General Grossetti decided that it should be continued on 8 May with the help of four observation balloons. The day for the main infantry attack was finally set for 9 May.

Overall the results of the four-day preliminary artillery bombardment proved unsatisfactory. The Allied fire did not cause severe damage to the Bulgarian and German defensive line as the greater focus of the artillery fire on some points of the line indicated the directions where the main attack was to be delivered. The defenders also used every possible moment to repair the damage to their fortifications covered by their artillery. The Allied bombardment left the Bulgarian and German artillery and its observation posts practically untouched. While the Bulgarian infantry units suffered 945 casualties during the four days of bombardment, the losses of the artillery were only ten men killed or wounded and several guns damaged or destroyed.

=== Infantry assault ===
The Allied command set the beginning of the infantry attack for 6:30 on 9 May. As the infantry prepared, the artillery resumed its barrage with much greater vigour, engulfing the entire defensive line in a cloud of smoke and dust again. At 6:30, the Italian, French and Russian infantry moved out of their trenches, advancing against the Bulgarian and German positions along an 11 km long line.

==== The assault of the 35th Division ====
The 35th Italian Infantry Division attacked the Bulgarian 2/2 Infantry Brigade and German 201st Infantry Brigade with its Sicilia and Ivrea infantry brigades(61st, 62nd, 161st and 162nd infantry regiments). The focal points of the assault were the powerful positions on Hill 1020 and Hill 1050. To the right, parts of the 61st regiment took advantage of the dust cloud left by the barrage, capturing a forward trench that the Bulgarians had evacuated to preserve their infantry from the Allied artillery fire. Soon after, the Bulgarian infantry responded with a counterattack that pushed back the Italians and recaptured the trench. Meanwhile, further to the right of these events, the troops of the Italian 61st regiment advanced against the Bulgarian I/9 infantry battalion but were repulsed by artillery fire. However, the regiment's 1st and 3rd battalions had greater success and managed to take control of the first-line trench of the 9th German Jäger Battalion between Hill 1020 and Hill 1050. The Italian soldiers continued advancing towards the second line of trenches, succeeding in entering it because most of the defenders were still in the trenches and galleries on the northern slopes of hills 1020 and 1050. Soon after, the Bulgarian and German rifle, machine gun and artillery fire intensified and caused heavy casualties to the attackers as it hit the Italians from their front and flanks. The commander of the 3rd Battalion Major Tonti was killed. At 7:40, the commander of the Jägers requested reinforcements from the neighbouring Bulgarian units and counterattacked as soon as they arrived. The Germans and Bulgarians quickly regained control of their lost trenches(capturing 120 prisoners in the process), forcing the Italian 61st Regiment to fall back to its starting positions.

In the center of the Italian front of attack, the 161st Infantry Regiment was tasked with taking Hill 1050, but its advance met with a powerful barrage delivered by the Bulgarian artillery. Still, parts of the left flank and center of the regiment reached the first trenches as another detachment succeeded in getting round the hill from the east. While they advanced these troops were also subjected to very heavy artillery, trench-mortar and machine-gun fire which was the prelude for a counterattack delivered by the German Guard Jaegers that saw the entire Italian regiment thrown back to its original positions. During the Italian attack and German counterattack, the 161st regiment suffered heavy losses. One of its infantry companies was almost destroyed by the explosion of a mine laid in the trenches by the defenders.

On the right of the Italian front, the attacking 162nd Italian regiment suffered the same fate as the other attacking forces. It attacked a hill defended by troops of the German 45th Infantry Regiment and initially succeeded in overcoming the barbed wire and occupying part of the first line of trenches. To their right, however, the 16th French Colonial Division failed to permanently capture the vital hill Piton Rocheaux, which left the Italian flank unsupported and vulnerable. As a result, the Italians were met by very heavy artillery, machine-gun and hand-grenade fire from behind, and machine-gun fire coming from their right flank. This obliged them to fall back to their starting trenches. By this time, the total losses of the Ivrea Brigade(161st and 162nd regiments) were 40 officers and around 1000 soldiers.

Thus the first assault on the Bulgarian and German positions ended in almost complete failure. General Pennella ordered the attack to be resumed with the help of the divisional artillery. At 9:45, the Italian infantry moved forward again, but as conditions hadn't improved in their favour, they achieved no better success and again suffered heavy losses. By midday, the attack had died off, and General Pennella postponed it. By the end of the day, the Italians had lost between 2,400 and 2700 men, which amounted to about 21% of the committed infantry. One Italian observation balloon was also lost. During the infantry attack on 9 May, the Allied artillery in the Italian sector fired 31,235 shells against the defenders.

==== The assault in the French sector ====
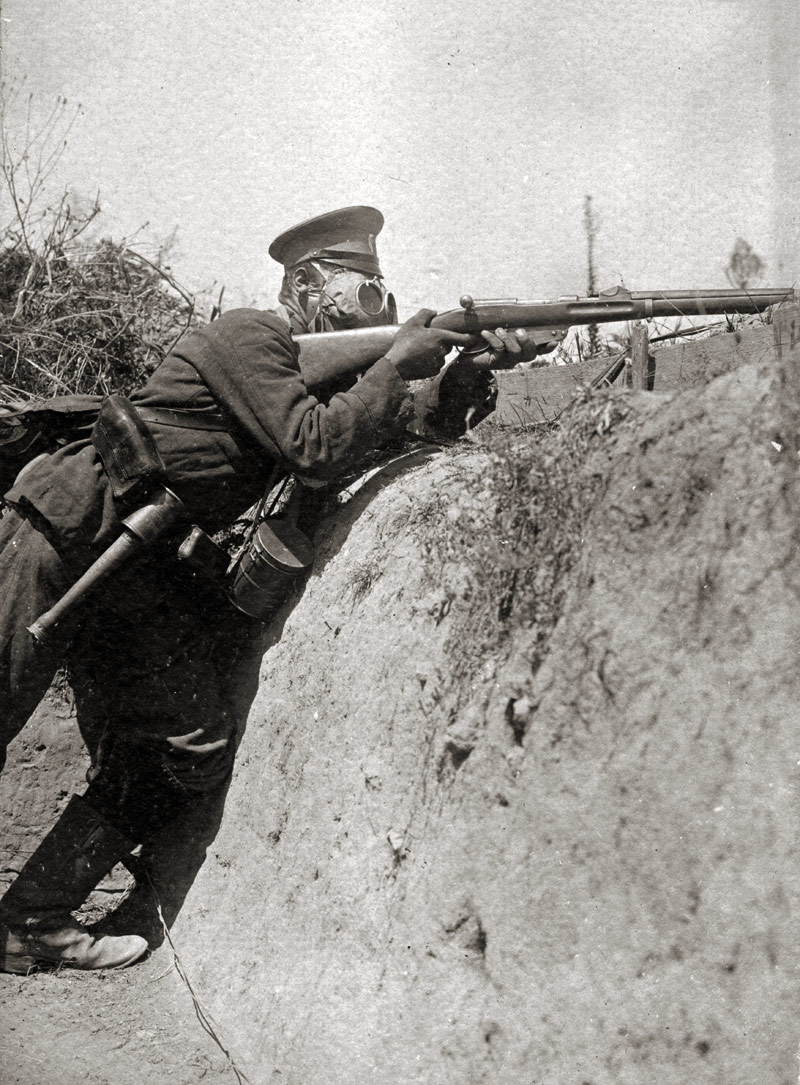
Bulgarian soldier firing his rifle from a trench

The 16th French Colonial Infantry Division, which was neighbouring the Italian 35th division to its east, was ordered to attack with its 12 battalions the positions of the Bulgarian 3/7 Infantry Brigade and parts of the German 201st Infantry Brigade (6 Bulgarian and German battalions in total). The artillery preparation for the attack began at 4:30 and peaked in intensity about an hour later. The Allied bombardment destroyed many of the Bulgarian forward infantry observation posts, caused damage to the fortifications and covered the three hills that were the attack's objectives in a dense cloud of smoke and dust. At 6:30, the French infantry advanced with three regiments in the first line and one regiment in reserve.

On the right, the 8th Colonial Infantry Regiment assaulted the hill "Dalag Greben"(its French designation was Piton Rocheaux), infiltrating the trenches defended by two of the German 201st Infantry Brigade's battalions. However, following a costly hand-to-hand engagement, the French were driven out, exposing the flank of the attacking Italians to the left of these positions, contributing to their defeat.

In the center, the 4th Colonial Regiment moved against the hill named by the Bulgarians "Shtabna Visochina"(its French designation was Piton Jaune)and managed to advance without initially being spotted as many of the Bulgarian observes had been killed or wounded. However, the few that had survived the French bombardment were able to fire their red flairs and signal the defenders as the attackers reached the barbed wire lines. Almost immediately, the Bulgarian infantry came out from its shelters or hide-outs into the trenches and opened heavy rifle and machine gun fire on the French. This caught the first wave of attackers by surprise and forced them to retreat, which in turn caused the two waves of French infantry that followed to waver and eventually withdraw. Meanwhile, the French came under Bulgarian artillery fire and suffered heavy casualties.

To the right, the French 37th Colonial Regiment had better luck and managed to enter and occupy the trenches on Hill "Vaskova Visochina"(Tranchees rouges) undetected, where they placed in position several machine guns. The reason was that nearby Bulgarian infantry was still mostly in its shelters. A general alert was sounded when an observer from a nearby Bulgarian company spotted the French. The Bulgarian battalion's troops, responsible for defending the hill, immediately came out of their shelters and counterattacked under a hail of rifle and machine gun bullets. With the help of some Bulgarian machine guns firing at the exposed French flank, the Bulgarians managed to reach and enter the trenches, where hard hand-to-hand combat ensued. Many Bulgarian officers were killed, including the battalion commander Captain Vaskov. The counterattack also began drawing in the battalions reserves, positioned some 600 meters to the north, that attempted to advance against the French flanks. On the left, the Bulgarians managed to enter the trenches occupied by the French and neutralize or capture some of their machine guns. As more Bulgarian infantry and German machine guns became involved in the counterattack, the 37th Colonial Regiment's soldiers were finally forced to abandon the hill and retreat.

By 8:00, the attack of the 16th Colonial Division was beaten along the entire defensive line. Thus at 9:00, the division reinforced its attacking units and began a second attack against the hills "Shtabna Visochina" and "Vaskova Visochina," which was once again defeated. The losses of the Bulgarian 3/7 Infantry Brigade for the day were 134 killed and 276 wounded. The brigade captured 44 French troops in a half-drunken state and reported that its soldiers had counted 725 killed French soldiers. A few days following the attack, General Sarrail reported a total of around 1,000 casualties in the 16th Colonial Division for the attack on 9 May.

Further east of the 16th Colonial Division was the French 17th Colonial Division. On 9 May, they were tasked with attacking the positions of the 22nd German-Bulgarian Infantry Brigade in conjunction with the Russian 2nd Independent Infantry Brigade. The artillery preparation in this sector began at 5:15 in the morning(guided by an observation balloon), reaching peak intensity at about 6:00 when it covered most of the German and Bulgarian lines. At precisely 6:30, the barrage lifted from the first line of trenches and moved on to their rear. At this moment, the French infantry advanced in three waves, with three regiments in the first line and one in reserve. Halfway across no man's land, the attackers were spotted by Bulgarian artillerymen and subjected to heavy artillery shelling. While one part of the attacking French soldiers was killed, wounded or seeking cover, another part successfully reached and entered the first line of Bulgarian and German trenches. They engaged the defenders in hand-to-hand combat but were defeated and pushed back. The French failed to take the vital position named "Caesar," giving a tactical advantage to the defenders who could concentrate their efforts on deflecting the Russian attack. At 8:45, the first French assault was decisively beaten. At 11:00, the French infantry attempted another attack but only 15 minutes later were forced to withdraw to their starting positions. The soldiers that the Bulgarians captured were found to be half-drunk with their canteens filled with wine or liqueur. A third French attack was carried out in the afternoon but was once again beaten back by 18:00. The total casualties suffered by the 17th Colonial Division during the day were about 700 men.

==== Assault of the Russian 2nd Independent Infantry Brigade ====
Six out of the 18 battalions detailed for the attack on the 22nd German-Bulgarian Infantry Brigade's positions belonged to the Russian 2nd Independent Infantry Brigade of General Dietrikhs. This brigade was added to the Franco-Italian group in the Crna Bend a short time before the beginning of the Allied offensive. It occupied part of the front situated between the French 16th and 17th colonial divisions.

On 9 May, the Russian infantry began attacking the German and Bulgarian lines at 6:30, in close cooperation with the neighbouring 17th Colonial Division. On the brigade's right flank, the 3rd Infantry Regiment advanced against the "Heintselman" hill, occupied by one of the German 42nd Infantry Regiment's battalions. At the same time, on the left flank, the 4th Infantry Regiment attacked the important Hill "Dabica," which was defended by another battalion of the German 42nd Infantry Regiment. As soon as the Russians were spotted the German and Bulgarian artillery opened fire on their advancing waves of infantry which allowed only parts of the Russian 3rd regiment to enter the "Heitselman" trenches while most of its soldiers had sought cover next to the barbed wire before the hill itself. At Dabica, however, the German artillery proved too weak to halt the attack of the Russian 4th Infantry Regiment, whose troops successfully penetrated the main trench with the help of hand grenades and advanced so rapidly through it that by 8:00 the entire hill fell under their control. As a result, the headquarters of the 22nd German-Bulgarian lost connection with its troops in the area, receiving no clear information about the situation until late in the afternoon. While many of the German defenders managed to retreat from the hill and gathered around by the Bulgarian reserve, the Russians also took 4 German officers and 74 German soldiers from the II/42 German battalion as prisoners.

The capture of Dabica was the battle's most important Allied achievement. Unfortunately for the Russians, this success was not expanded because the attack of the French against the "Caesar" position failed, allowing the Germans and Bulgarians to clear "Heintselman" of Russian presence. Thus by 8:45, most of the first major Allied attack was repelled, leaving only Dabica in Russian hands. The situation of the 4th regiment remained serious because the Bulgarians and Germans were encircling it from three sides.

At 14:40, the commander of the Franco-Russian forces, General Lebouc, ordered the Russian Brigade to attack and capture "Heintselman" with its 3rd regiment as the 17th Colonial Division carried out a new assault against "Caesar." The attack, which was scheduled for 17:30, was preceded by a very short but powerful artillery barrage which caused damage to the defensive line. Still, once the attacking Russian and French infantry moved out of its trenches and reached the Bulgarian barbed wire, it was hit by a powerful artillery bombardment from the nearby Bulgarian and German batteries, which caused great confusion among its ranks. Thus, three consecutive waves of attacking infantry were driven back to their starting trenches, and the Russian infantry which managed to get to "Heintselman" was decisively repelled by its German defenders. By 18:00, the attack was called off altogether.

Despite this setback, the Russians continued to hold their positions on "Dabitsa," but the initiative was now in German and Bulgarian hands. The commander of the 22nd Infantry Brigade colonel von Reuter planned to retake his lost positions by attacking from both the west and east sides of "Dabica." The artillery preparation for the attack began at 19:40, delivering a devastating bombardment on the Russian positions. Under its cover at 19:55 the infantry counterattack began with the German Jägers attacking from the west and the Bulgarians attacking from the east. The Russian positions proved untenable, and by 20:10, the Germans and Bulgarians linked up on top of the hill.

With the recapture of "Dabica," the integrity of the entire defensive line in the Crna Bend sector was restored, and the battle on 9 May ended in a decisive victory for the Central Powers. Russian casualties were heavy and ranged from 975 to 1325 men killed or wounded.

== Aftermath ==
During the decisive Allied infantry assault, the Bulgarians suffered 681 men killed or wounded, most of them in the 302nd division, which brought their total losses to 1,626 men from 5 to 9 May 1917. Though German fatalities during the attack are unknown, they were likely heavy because the German units were usually caught in the thick of the fighting. On the other hand, the Allies had sustained some 5,450 casualties during the attack on 9 May for no gain.

Despite the failure, General Sarrail was not ready to give up on his offensive and new attacks were made by the Italians and French in the Crna Bend on 11 and 17 May, which failed. Finally, following the French defeat around Monastir and the British defeat at Lake Doiran, General Sarrail called off the entire offensive on 21 May.

== Sources ==
In Bulgarian

- Дошкинов, Петър (1935). Майското сражение в завоя на Черна 1917 г. Печатница на Военно-издателския фонд.

In English:

- Hall, Richard (2010). Balkan Breakthrough: The Battle of Dobro Pole 1918. Indiana University Press. ISBN 978-0-253-35452-5.
- Villari, Luigi (1922). The Macedonian campaign. T.F. Unwin ltd.

In Russian:

- Данилов, Ю.Л. (1933). Русские отряды на французском и Македонском фронтах. 1916—1918 г.г. Союза офицеровь участниковъ войньи на французскомъ фронте.
- Корсун (1939). Балканский фронт. Воениздат НКО СССР.(In Russian)
