= Paul François Grossetti =

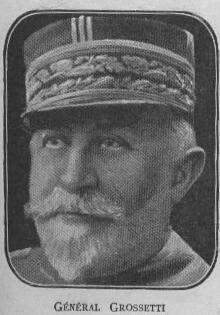
- Born: 10 September 1861; Paris, Second French Empire
- Died: 7 January 1918 (aged 56); Paris, French Third Republic
- Burial place: Père Lachaise Cemetery
- Military career
- Allegiance: France
- Branch: French Army
- Rank: Army General
- Conflicts: World War I

Paul François Grossetti (French pronunciation: [pɔl fʁɑ̃swa ɡʁoseti]; Paris, 10 September 1861 – Paris, 7 January 1918) was a French Army general during World War I.

== Early years ==
Grossetti was born in Paris, the son of Paul François Grossetti (born in Grosseto-Prugna). His father was a captain in the 44th Infantry Regiment, based in Paris. His mother was Anna Félicité Colonna. Both were of Corsican descent.
Paul studied at the Ecole Spéciale Militaire de Saint-Cyr and graduated 3rd of 357 in his class.

Once in the army, he was first stationed in Africa, where he fought against Algerian insurgents in 1881-1882. Later, he was stationed in Asia, where he participated in the Tonkin Campaign (1885-1887). After this campaign, he returned to Africa (1887-1890).

== World War I ==
At the outbreak of World War I, as a general, he received command of the 42nd Infantry Division.
He participated in the Battle of the Ardennes on 21–25 August. Then the division was transported west, where it contributed to the victory of the First Battle of the Marne. On 21 October 1914, the division arrived in Flanders, to support the hard-pressed Belgian Army during the Battle of the Yser.
For his notable leadership, Grossetti was given command of the 16th Army Corps on 7 November 1914, in the midst of the First Battle of Ypres.

In 1915-1916, he fought with his Army Corps in the Battles of Champagne and the Battle of Verdun.
On 1 February 1917, Grossetti became the new commander of the French Army of the Orient in Macedonia. After the unsuccessful Battle of the Crna Bend (1917), Grossetti was infected by dysentery and was repatriated to France in September 1917. There he died from the disease in January 1918 and was buried in the Père Lachaise Cemetery.

King Albert I of Belgium had a statue erected in Ajaccio, in gratitude for the intervention by Grossetti's 42nd Division during the Battle of the Yser.
