= Hans Wagner (general) =

- Born: 11 March 1896; Saarbrücken, German Empire
- Died: 13 May 1967 (aged 71); Ulm, Baden-Württemberg, West Germany
- Military career
- Allegiance: Nazi Germany
- Branch: Army
- Service years: 1914–1920; 1935–1945
- Rank: Generalleutnant
- Commands: 269th Infantry Division
- Conflicts: World War II
- Awards: Knight's Cross of the Iron Cross

Hans Wagner (11 March 1896 – 13 May 1967) was a German general in the Wehrmacht of Nazi Germany during World War II who commanded the 269th Infantry Division. He was a recipient of the Knight's Cross of the Iron Cross. After the war, Wagner was a member of the Schnez-Truppe, a clandestine shadow army, intended to fight against the Soviet Union in the event of an invasion, or German communists during a civil war.

== Awards and decorations ==
- Knight's Cross of the Iron Cross on 18 April 1943 as Oberst and commander of Artillerie-Regiment 5

Military offices
| Preceded by Generalleutnant Curt Badinski | Commander of 269. Infanterie-Division; 25 November 1943 – 8 May 1945 | Succeeded by None |
