= Giuseppe Pennella =

Italian Lieutenant General

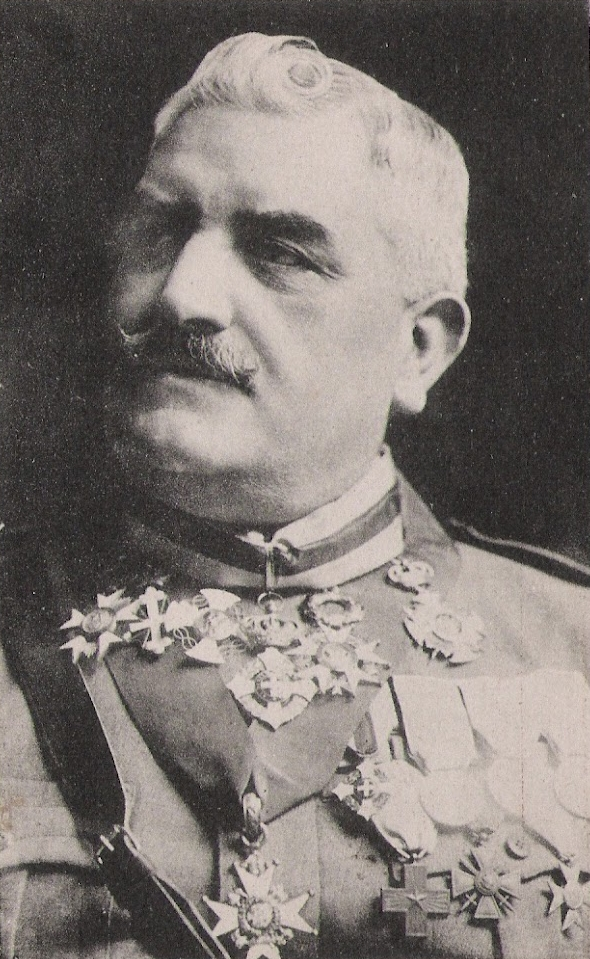
- Born: September 8, 1864; Rionero in Vulture, Basilicata, Italy
- Died: September 15, 1925 (aged 61); Florence, Tuscany, Italy
- Military career
- Allegiance: Kingdom of Italy
- Branch: Royal Italian Army
- Service years: 1882–1920
- Rank: Lieutenant General
- Unit: Allied Army of the Orient
- Commands: 35th Infantry Division
- Conflicts: World War I: Italian Front; Fourth Battle of the Isonzo; Battle of Asiago; Sixth Battle of the Isonzo; Seventh Battle of the Isonzo; Second Battle of the Piave River; Battle of Vittorio Veneto; Macedonian front; Second Battle of the Crna Bend

Giuseppe Pennella (1864–1925) was an Italian lieutenant general who was a highly decorated officer of the Royal Italian Army. During the First World War, he held very high positions, commanding in succession: the "Grenadiers of Sardinia" Brigade, 35th Division, XI Army Corps, 2nd Army, 8th Army and XII Army Corps. At the head of the 35th Division, he operated in the Macedonian front, but was relieved of command at the request of the French general Sarrail, who was commander of the Armée d'Orient, as both had a strong disagreement over command.

== Biography ==
He was born in Rionero in Vulture on August 8, 1864, the son of Antonio and Maddalena Plastino. He left his hometown at the age of 13 to enter the Nunziatella Military School in Naples and graduated in 1882 to attend the Military Academy of Modena, where he was made a second lieutenant. (Note: Without enjoying the thrusts of "recommendations", he ranked 450 out of 499 eligible students.) He subsequently attended the Italian War School, ranking second out of 30, and was appointed Chief of Staff.

Between 1894 and 1899 and in 1902, he carried out accurate surveys (Note: These reconnaissance, which took place in the context of the Triple Alliance, were in function of the entry into the war of the Kingdom of Italy alongside the Central Empires) of the areas of San Gottardo, Haute Savoie, the Ligurian Apennines, the Jura and Switzerland. (Note: Engaged in delicate military missions, Giuseppe Pennella also dedicated himself to the publication of military, political, social and literary works. He was a poet and musician, and wrote and set to music, among other things, a "prayer of the Italian soldier in the field", "Passa il Re". He also played "Ave Maria" by Giosuè Carducci, extracted from the Ode "La Chiesa di Polenta".) With the outbreak of the First World War, he was promoted to colonel, and in May 1915, with the approach of Italy's entry into the war he became head of the secretarial office of the Chief of Staff of the Royal Italian Army of General Luigi Cadorna. In November of that year, he obtained (Note: A few days after his departure Cadorna paid him the following solemn commendation: With his departure, imposed by the need for career and staff, the General Staff loses a very talented officer and I one of the most brilliant and devoted collaborators, but I am certain that the "Grenadiers of Sardinia" Brigade acquires in him an excellent commander) command of the "Granatieri di Sardegna" Brigade, replacing General Luigi Pirzio Biroli. The grenadiers under his orders distinguished themselves at "Altitude 188", in front of Gorizia, and then in the defense of Monte Cengio, during the very hard (Note: On May 22, 1916, General Pennella, commander of the "Granatieri di Sardegna" Brigade, had given the following order in writing: No officer in command of a unit is allowed to abandon it while fighting, even if reduced to only one man : if all the wingmen die, all the more reason the officers must die on the spot.) and bloody (Note: For the defense of Monte Cengio seven Gold Medals for military valor were awarded to as many men of the "Grenadiers of Sardinia" Brigade: Federico Morozzo della Rocca, Giani Stuparich, Carlo Stuparich, Nicola Nisco, Alfonso Samoggia, Teodoro Capocci, Ugo Bignami.) Battle of Asiago on June 3, 1916. After participating in the Sixth (August 6–17), and Seventh Battle of the Isonzo from September 14 to 18, on December 4. he transferred command of the brigade to Colonel Brigadier Giovanni Albertazzi, and on September 21, he assumed the post of Chief of Staff of the 4th Army, cooperating in the defense of Cadore and the defensive actions of the Fasso Alps, to then move on to that of the 3rd Army.

Between April 26 and May 24, 1917, he was commander of the 35th Division and at the same time of the Allied Army of the Orient, replacing General Carlo Petitti di Roreto, but came into conflict with the French general Maurice Sarrail, commander of the Armée d 'Orient and was removed from office by Cadorna. He distinguished himself on the Balkan front and was awarded the Commander's Cross of the Order of the Star of the Karađorđević. In October of the same year, he was appointed commander of the 11th Army Corps, to pass on March 1, 1918, on the decision of the new Chief of Staff Armando Diaz, at the head of the 2nd Army which left on June 1 to take over that of the 8th Army of Montello. He took part in the Solstice Battle, at the end of which, under pressure from the Deputy Chief of Staff, General Pietro Badoglio, Diaz removed him from command, replacing him with General Enrico Caviglia. He took part in the Battle of Vittorio Veneto at the head of the XII Army Corps (Note: Composed of the 22nd Italian Division and the 48th English Division.) advancing on the Altopiano dei Sette Comuni, freed Pergine Valsugana, avoiding atrocities committed in other places during the Austro-Hungarian retreat. At the end of the conflict he had been wounded five times, twice promoted for war merits, and highly decorated for military valor with three silver medals and one in bronze for military valor, the Knight's Cross, and then that of Commander of the Military Order of Savoy and the War Merit Cross.

In 1919 he was designated by the Italian government to command a force of 85,000 men who would have had to intervene in Georgia in order to maintain the independence of the new Caucasian countries from the aims of the nascent Soviet Union but this expedition was not carried out.

He then assumed command of the Army Corps of Florence and also held the position of president of the Florentine Provincial Deputation, being placed in reserve in 1920. After obtaining various decorations, he died in Florence in 1925.

== Legacy ==
Commissioned by a committee chaired by Benito Mussolini, Armando Diaz, Luigi Cadorna and other civil and military personalities, his native town of Rionero in Vulture erected a bronze statue dedicated to him. (Note: General Pennella's family correspondence was donated by his wife Elisa to the State Archives of Potenza in 1940.) In June 1968, on the fiftieth anniversary of the Second Battle of the Piave River, the municipality of Pergine Valsugana conferred honorary citizenship on him and dedicated the main street to him; in Giavera del Montello a monument was erected in his honor by the sculptor Memo Botter.

== Awards ==
- Military Order of Savoy, Knight (December 28, 1916)
- Military Order of Savoy, Commander (February 24, 1918)
- Medal of Military Valor, Silver (Awarded Three times: August 9–15, 1916, May 29 – June 3, 1916 and September 14–15, 1916)
- Medal of Military Valor, Bronze (November 1–4, 1918)
- Cross of Seniority (Italy)
- War Merit Cross
- Commemorative Medal for the Italo-Austrian War 1915–1918
- Commemorative Medal of the Unity of Italy
- Allied Victory Medal
- Order of Saints Maurice and Lazarus, Commander
- Order of the Crown of Italy, Commander

=== Foreign Awards ===
- France: Croix de guerre 1914–1918
- France: Legion of Honour, Commander
- Serbia: Order of Karađorđe's Star, Commander
- United Kingdom: Order of the Bath, Commander

== Works ==
- Comparative study of the exercise regulations for the infantry in Germany, Switzerland, Italy, France (Reg. In force and projected), Russia and Austria, Italian publishing house, Rome, 1902.
- The urgent question: the problem of paintings in the Royal Army, Italian publishing house, Rome, 1902.
- The new regulation of exercises for the infantry: commented and compared to the one in force up to now, Italian publishing house, Rome, 1905
- The land of the region including the surroundings of Florence: geographic and topographical tactical study, Italian publishing house, Rome, 1905
- Essays on applied tactics for minor departments of the three weapons, 3 Vol., Italian publishing house, Rome, 1907–1908.
- Today's machine guns in field warfare, La Speranza, Rome, 1908.
- The combatant officer's vademecum, Rome, 1909.
- The vademecum of the complement officer: complete summary of the ministerial programs of: tactics and service in war, fortification, topography and staffing, complementary notions, Tipografia del Senato, Rome, 1915.
- The breviary of the duties of a war platoon commander, Tipografia del Senato, Rome, 1915.
- Our renewed tactical-logistic regulation summarized and ordered by topic affinity, La Speranza, Rome, 1915.
- Twelve months under the command of the Grenadier Brigade, 2 Vol., Printing house of the Senate, Rome, 1923.
