= Kanatlarci =

Kanatlarci Канатларци Kanatlar
- Village
- Location within North Macedonia
- Coordinates: 41°12′37″N 21°30′11″E
- Country: North Macedonia
- Region: Pelagonia
- Municipality: Prilep
- Elevation: 599 m (1,965 ft)

Population (2021)
  - Total: 1,202
- Time zone: UTC+1 (CET)
  - Summer (DST): UTC+2 (CEST)
- Postal code: 7512
- Area code: +389/48/4XXXXX
- Car plates: PP
- Website: .

Kanatlarci (Macedonian: Канатларци, Turkish: Kanatlar), according to the 2001 census, is the largest village and second largest settlement in the municipality of Prilep, North Macedonia. It used to be part of the former municipality of Topolčani.

== Demographics ==
In the early Ottoman period, Kanatlarci was one of several villages in the Pelagonia plain settled by nomadic Turkomen tribes from Anatolia during 1475–1543.

On the Ethnographic Map of the Bitola Vilayet of the Cartographic Institute in Sofia from 1901, Kanatlarci appears as a mixed Bulgarian-Albanian-Turkish village in the Prilep kaza, having 142 houses.

According to the 2002 census, the village had a total of 972 inhabitants. Ethnic groups in the village include:

- Turks 791
- Macedonians 111
- Bosniaks 69
- Albanians 1
