= 226th Infantry Division (Wehrmacht) =

- Active: June 1944–May 1945
- Country: Nazi Germany
- Branch: Army
- Type: Infantry
- Size: Division
- Engagements: World War II: Atlantic pockets; Operation Astonia

The 226th Infantry Division (German: 226. Infanterie-Division) was an infantry division of the German Heer during World War II.

== History ==
The 226th Infantry Division was formed on 26 June 1944 on the military base at Neuhammer. A division of the 27th Aufstellungswelle, its staff was taken from the dissolved 111th Infantry Division. Initially, the 226th Infantry Division consisted of the Grenadier Regiments 1040, 1041, and 1042, as well as the Artillery Regiment 226.

The deployment of the 226th Infantry Division was completed by 15 August 1944 and the division was transferred to the Western Front. There, the division, after combat in the Operation Astonia, was put on defensive duty in various coastal fortresses, including Calais and Dunkirk. As the Allied forces advanced through France, the units of the 226th Infantry Division were entrapped in the Atlantic pockets. Calais was captured by the Allies on 30 September 1944, causing the loss of Grenadier Regiment 1041. Dunkirk remained under siege until 9 May 1945, after German surrender. Between September 1944 and May 1945, the 226 Infantry Division continued to fight at Kampfgruppe strength.

== Superior formations ==
Organizational chart of the 226th Infantry Division
Year	Month	Army Corps	Army	Army Group
1944	August	LXVII Army Corps	15th Army	Army Group B
1944	September – November	Army Reserves	15th Army	Army Group B
1944	December	Marine-Oberkommando West		
1945	January – April	Marine-Oberkommando West		
