= Richard John (general) =

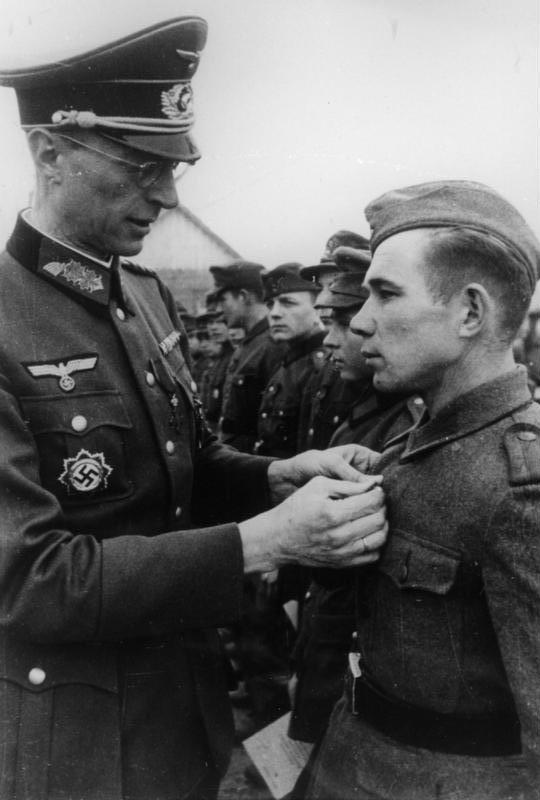
- John decorating a Soviet voulenteer in the Wehrmacht
- Born: 21 June 1896; Wilhelmshaven
- Died: 19 February 1965 (aged 68); Garmisch-Partenkirchen
- Military career
- Allegiance: German Empire (to 1918); Weimar Republic (to 1933); Nazi Germany
- Branch: Army (Wehrmacht)
- Service years: 1914–1945
- Rank: Generalleutnant
- Commands: 292. Infanterie-Division
- Conflicts: World War I World War II
- Awards: Knight's Cross of the Iron Cross

Richard John (21 June 1896 – 19 February 1965) was a German general during World War II who commanded several divisions notably the 292nd Infantry Division. He was a recipient of the Knight's Cross of the Iron Cross.

== Awards and decorations ==
- Knight's Cross of the Iron Cross on 20 December 1943 as Generalmajor and commander of 292. Infanterie-Division

Military offices
Preceded by Generalleutnant Wolfgang von Kluge	Commander of 292. Infanterie-Division; 20 July 1943 – 30 June 1944	Succeeded by Generalmajor Johannes Gittner
