= 269th Infantry Division =

- 269. Infanterie-Division
- Active: August 1939 – May 1945
- Country: Nazi Germany
- Branch: Army
- Type: Infantry
- Size: Division
- Engagements: World War II: France 1940; Operation Barbarossa; Raseiniai; Leningrad

The 269th Infantry Division was a major fighting formation of the German Army (Wehrmacht). It was created in August 1939, and first saw combat in the Battle of France, and was then posted to occupation duties in Denmark. In the summer of 1941 the division advanced towards Leningrad in operation Barbarossa as part of Army Group North. Following the final drive on the city and the subsequent siege, the division spent the winter and the next summer in defensive action along the Volkov river front, combating repeated Soviet attempts to restore land communications to Leningrad.

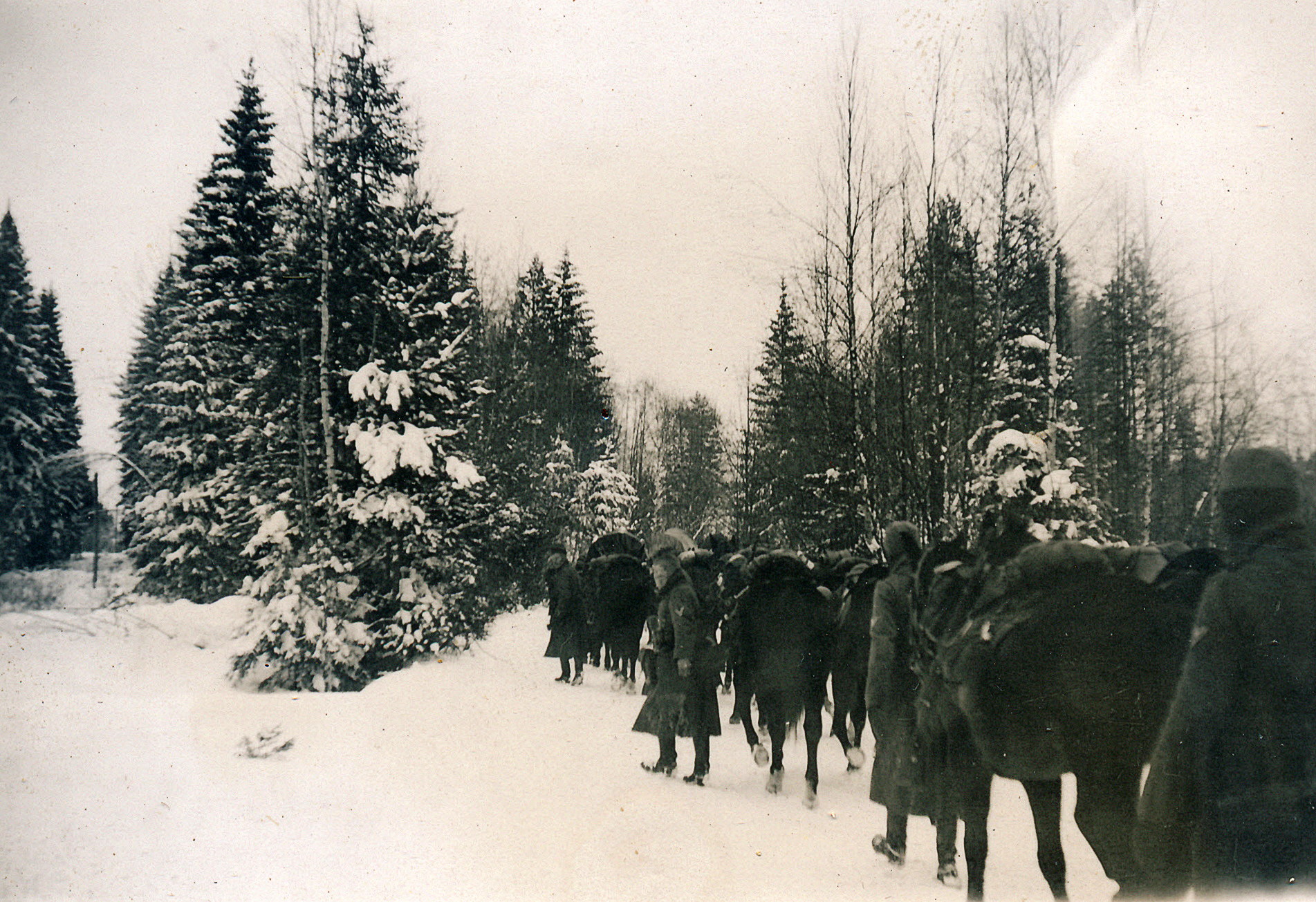
Column from Infantry Regiment 490

In December 1942 the division was transferred to Norway, where it remained for the next two years. The division returned to action in November 1944, firstly in the west against the US forces and finally as a Battlegroup (Kampfgruppe) back in the east where the remains of the division finally surrendered to the Soviet forces in May 1945 at the end of the war.

== Commanding officers ==
- General der Artillerie Ernst-Eberhard Hell, 1. September 1939 – 12. August 1940
- Generalleutnant Wolfgang Edler Herr und Freiherr von Plotho, 12. August 1940 – 31. March 1941
- General der Infanterie Ernst von Leyser, 1 April 1941 – 31 August 1942
- Generalleutnant Kurt Badinski, 1. September 1942 – 24 November 1943
- Generalleutnant Hans Wagner 25. Nov. 1943 – 8 May 1945
