= 62nd Corps (German Empire) =

62nd Corps (Generalkommando zbV 62)
- Flag of the Staff of a Generalkommando (1871–1918)
- Active: January 1917-October 1918
- Disbanded: October 1918
- Country: German Empire
- Branch: Army
- Engagements: World War I

Insignia
- Abbreviation: Genkdo zbV 62

The 62nd Corps (German: Generalkommando zbV 62) was a corps formation of the German Army in World War I. It was formed in January 1917 and dissolved in October 1918.

== Chronicle ==
The 62nd Corps (z.b.V.) was formed in January 1917.

With the onset of trench warfare, the German Army recognised that it was no longer possible to maintain the traditional Corps unit, that is, one made up of two divisions. Whereas at some times (and in some places) a Corps of two divisions was sufficient, at other times 5 or 6 divisions were necessary. Therefore, under the Hindenburg regime (from summer 1916), new Corps headquarters were created without organic divisions. These new Corps were designated General Commands for Special Use (German: Generalkommandos zur besonderen Verwendung).

The 62nd Corps was dissolved in October 1918.

== Commanders ==
The 62nd Corps had the following commanders during its existence:

Commander	From	To
Generalleutnant Richard von Webern	15 December 1916	19 February 1918
Generalleutnant Paul Fleck	19 February 1918	23 October 1918

== See also ==
- German Army (German Empire)

== Bibliography ==
- Cron, Hermann (2002). Imperial German Army 1914-18: Organisation, Structure, Orders-of-Battle [first published: 1937]. Helion & Co. ISBN 1-874622-70-1.
- Ellis, John; Cox, Michael (1993). The World War I Databook. Aurum Press Ltd. ISBN 1-85410-766-6.
